= List of dual place names in New Zealand =

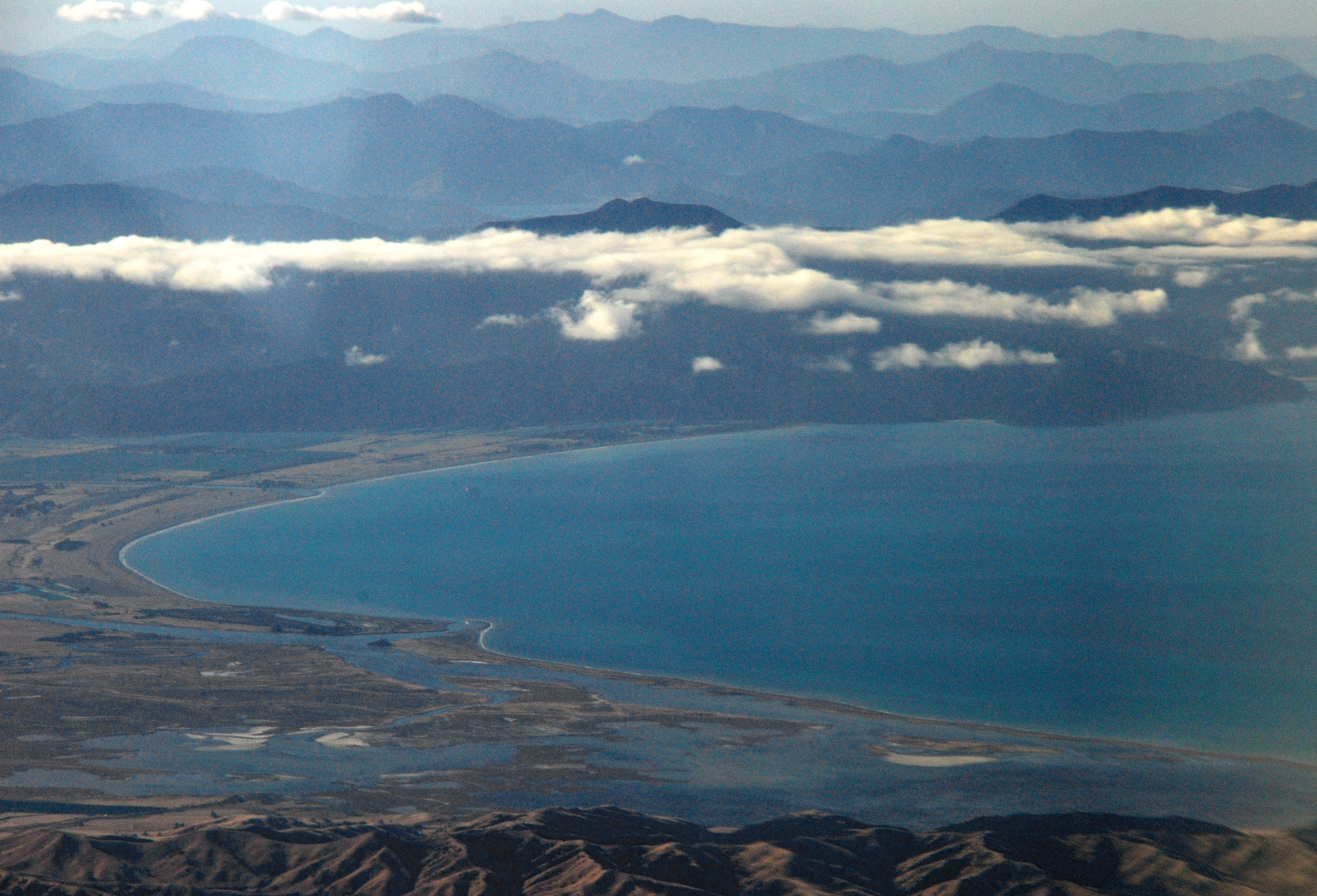
The agreed dual name of Te Koko-o-Kupe / Cloudy Bay remembers both the Māori and British explorations of New Zealand.

Some official place names in New Zealand are dual names, usually incorporating both the Māori place name and the name given by European settlers or explorers. Although a mixture of Māori and English names is the most common form of dual name, some places, such as Mahināpua Creek / Tūwharewhare, include Māori elements in each part of the name, and Wellington Harbour (Port Nicholson) incorporates two English names. One name, Port Levy (Potiriwi) / Koukourarata, has a triple name consisting of the Māori name, the European name, and a Māori transliteration of the latter.

The practice of giving certain New Zealand places dual names began in the 1920s, but dual names became much more common in the 1990s and 2000s, in part due to Treaty of Waitangi settlements. Many places have names with a long heritage in each culture. For instance, one settlement saw Cloudy Bay, given this name by Captain Cook in 1770, renamed Te Koko-o-Kupe / Cloudy Bay, with the Māori name recalling the early explorer Kupe scooping up oysters from the bay.

Uncommonly, a place may be given two alternative names instead of one dual name. Prominent examples include the North Island and Te Ika-a-Māui, the South Island and Te Waipounamu, and the town called Whanganui or Wanganui. These places are not included in the list below.

== Assignment and status ==
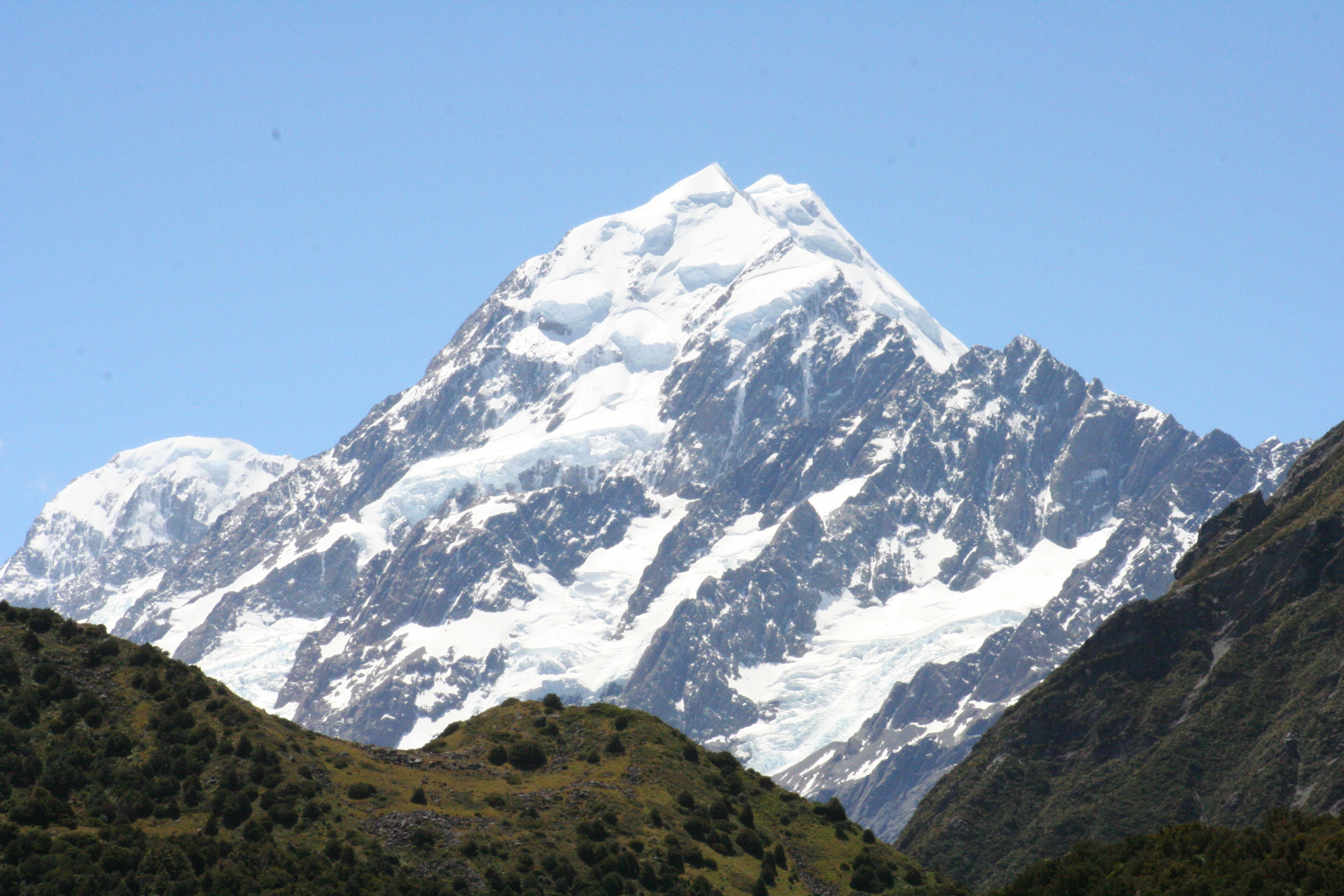
Many places were officially given dual names through the 1998 Ngāi Tahu treaty settlement, including Aoraki / Mount Cook

Official place names in New Zealand are usually determined by the New Zealand Geographic Board (Ngā Pou Taunaha o Aotearoa). In cases where there have been objections to a proposed name, a final decision is made by the Minister of Lands.

A large number of dual names have been conferred not by the NZGB, but were negotiated as part of Treaty of Waitangi claims settlements and then enacted by Parliament. The 1998 Ngāi Tahu settlement alone established 87 dual names, including Aoraki / Mount Cook.

Many New Zealand place names do not have official recognition by the NZGB, including most of New Zealand's major cities and, until 2013, both the North and South islands. Unofficial names are still recorded within the gazetteer, provided that they have "appeared in at least two publicly available authoritative publications or databases". In most cases, there is no functional difference between an official and unofficial name, with the NZGB expecting to standardise unofficial names as official by 2026.

== Orthography ==
Originally, the board gazetted dual names in a form where the less commonly used name was in parentheses, e.g. Taylors Mistake (Te Onepoto). In the 1990s the system was changed to separating the names with a forward slash, viz., name1/name2, e.g. Aoraki/Mount Cook. Now, placing a space before and after the slash is encouraged, viz., name1 / name2. In 2021, the New Zealand Geographic Board voted to standardise the orthography of dual place names, and is in the process of updating names which use parentheses to the more common forward slash.

The board now generally puts the Māori name first, but exceptions are sometimes made, for example when maritime safety is paramount (e.g. Baring Head / Ōrua-pouanui).

== List of official dual names ==
Dual name	Former name	Type of place	Region	Year adopted	Notes
Aldermen Islands (Ruamaahu) Nature Reserve		Nature Reserve	Coromandel	2009	
Alpine Lake / Ata Puai	Alpine Lake	Lake	West Coast	1998	
Aoraki / Mount Cook	Mount Cook	Mountain	Canterbury	1998	
Aoraki / Mount Cook National Park	Mount Cook National Park	National Park	Canterbury	1998	
Aoraki / Mount Cook Village	Mount Cook Village	Township	Canterbury	1998	
Aotea / Shelly Beach	Shelly Beach	Beach	Auckland	2013	
Ashburton River / Hakatere	Ashburton River	River	Canterbury	1998	
Ashley River / Rakahuri	Ashley River	River	Canterbury	1998	
Atiu or Middle Island	Middle Island	Island	Coromandel	1994	
Atuanui / Mount Auckland	Mount Auckland	Mountain	Auckland	2013	
Aua / King Billy Island	King Billy Island	Island	Canterbury	2020	
Autere / East End Beach	East End Beach	Beach	Taranaki	2017	
Avon River / Ōtākaro	Avon River	River	Canterbury	1998	
Awaroa / Godley Head	Godley Head	Headland	Canterbury	2003	
Baring Head / Ōrua-pouanui	Baring Head	Headland	Wellington	2009	
Blumine Island / Ōruawairua	Blumine Island	Island	Marlborough	1980	
Browning Pass / Nōti Raureka	Browning Pass	Mountain pass	West Coast	1998	
Burgess Island (Pokohinu)	Burgess Island	Island	Auckland	1982	
Cam River / Ruataniwha	Cam River	River	Canterbury	1998	
Campbell Island / Motu Ihupuku	Campbell Island	Island	Subantarctic islands	1998	
Campbell Island / Motu Ihupuku shelf	Campbell Island shelf	Oceanic shelf	Subantarctic islands	2014	
Canister Cove (Waikokopu)	Canister Cove	Bay	Chatham Islands	1982	
Cape Kidnappers / Te Kauwae-a-Māui	Cape Kidnappers	Cape	Hawke's Bay	2018	
Cape Reinga / Te Rerenga Wairua	Cape Reinga	Cape	Northland	2005	
Cave Creek / Kotihotiho	Cave Creek	River	West Coast	1998	Known for Cave Creek disaster
Clutha River / Mata-Au	Clutha River (upstream of river fork)	River	Otago	1998	
Codfish Island / Whenua Hou	Codfish Island	Island	Southland	2014	
Colac Bay / Ōraka	Colac Bay	Township	Southland	1998	
Colac Bay / Ōraka	Colac Bay	Bay	Southland	1998	
Columbia Bank / Te Nuku-o-Mourea	Columbia Bank	Ocean bank	Northland	2015	
Cook River / Weheka	Cook River	River	West Coast	1998	
Coopers Lagoon / Muriwai	Coopers Lagoon	Lagoon	Canterbury	1998	
Dart River / Te Awa Whakatipu	Dart River	River	Otago	1998	
Dog Island / Motuwhangaikirehe Island	Dog Island	Island	Northland	2013	
Double Island (Moturehu) Nature Reserve		Conservation Land	Coromandel	2009	While the name of the nature reserve is official, the island of the same name does not yet have an official name
Doubtful Sound / Patea	Doubtful Sound	Fiord	Fiordland	1998	
East Cape / Koromere	East Cape	Headland	Southland	1998	Not to be confused with East Cape, Gisborne
Estuary of the Heathcote and Avon Rivers/Ihutai	Estuary of the Heathcote and Avon Rivers	Estuary	Canterbury	1998	
Eyre Mountains / Taka Ra Haka Conservation Park		Conservation park	Southland	2015	
Fanal Island (Motukino)	Fanal Island	Island	Auckland	1982	
Flower Pot (Onoua)	Flower Pot	Locality	Chatham Islands	1982	
Fox Glacier / Te Moeka o Tuawe	Fox Glacier	Glacier	West Coast	1998	Name does not apply to the town.
Franz Josef / Waiau	Franz Josef	Township	West Coast	1998	
Franz Josef Glacier / Kā Roimata o Hine Hukatere	Franz Josef Glacier	Glacier	West Coast	1998	
Gillespies Point / Kōhaihai	Gillespies Point	Headland	West Coast	1998	
Goat Island / Rakiriri	Goat Island	Island	Otago	1998	
Goat Island / Rakariri Scenic Reserve	Goat Island Scenic Reserve	Conservation park	Otago	2009	
Golden Bay / Mohua	Golden Bay	Bay	Tasman	2014	
Greenstone River / Hokonui	Greenstone or Big Hohonu River	River	West Coast	1998	Not to be confused with Greenstone River, Otago
Greville Harbour / Wharariki	Greville Harbour	Harbour	Nelson	2014	
Grey River / Māwheranui	Grey River	River	West Coast	1998	
Groper Island / Tatapihi	Groper Island	Island	Auckland	1982	
Haast Pass / Tioripatea	Haast Pass	Mountain pass	Otago	1998	
Hamilton Island (Karaka) Scenic Reserve		Conservation park	Marlborough	1981	
Hāpūpū / J M Barker Historic Reserve		Historic Reserve	Chatham Islands	1987	
Harris Saddle / Tarahaka Whakatipu	Harris Saddle	Mountain pass	Otago	1998	
Haukawakawa / Madsen	Madsen	Locality	Nelson	1983	
Haupapa / Tasman Glacier	Tasman Glacier	Glacier	Canterbury	1998	
Hauraki Gulf / Tīkapa Moana	Hauraki Gulf	Bay	Auckland	2014	
Hawea (Clio Rocks) Marine Reserve		Marine Reserve	Fiordland	2011	
Hāwea / Bligh Sound	Bligh Sound	Fiord	Fiordland	2019	
Herekōpare Island / Te Marama	Herekopare Island	Island	Southland	1998	
Hikurangi / Goulter Hill	Goulter Hill	Hill	Marlborough	2014	
Hikurua / de Surville Canyon	de Surville Canyon	Submarine Canyon	Northland	2018	
Hikurua / de Surville Cliffs	de Surville Cliffs	Cliffs	Northland	2015	
Hinemoatū / Howard River	Howard River	River	Nelson	2014	
Hinenui / Nancy Sound	Nancy Sound	Fiord	Fiordland	2019	
Hollyford River / Whakatipu Kā Tuka	Hollyford River	River	Southland	1998	
Horoirangi / Drumduan	Drumduan	Hill	Nelson	2014	
Horomamae / Owen Island	Owen Island	Island	Southland	2001	
Howells Point / Taramea	Howells Point	Headland	Southland	1998	
Inainatū / Pile Bay	Pile Bay	Bay/inlet	Canterbury	2003	
Island Hill / Tumuaki	Island Hill	Hill	West Coast	1998	
Jackson Bay / Okahu	Jackson Bay	Bay/Inlet	West Coast	1998	Not applicable to the township
Jacksons Reef / Patuatini	Jacksons Reef	Reef	Waikato	1973	
Kahukura (Gold Arm) Marine Reserve		Marine Reserve	Fiordland	2011	
Kaikiekie / Bradshaw Sound	Bradshaw Sound	Fiord	Fiordland	2019	
Kaioruru / Church Bay	Church Bay	Bay/Inlet	Canterbury	2003	
Kaitangata / Mansons Peninsula	Mansons Peninsula	Peninsula	Canterbury	2020	
Kaitira / East Entry Point	East Entry Point	Headland	Nelson	1979	
Karaka / Hamilton Island	Hamilton Island	Island	Marlborough	2013	
Kārewa / Gannet Island	Gannet Island	Island	Waikato	2002	
Kauri Point Birkenhead / Te Mātā-rae-o-Mana	Kauri Point Birkenhead	Point	Auckland	2015	
Kawhitu or Stanley Island	Stanley Island (Aitu)	Island	Coromandel	1994	
Kirikirikatata / Mount Cook Range	Mount Cook Range	Mountain Range	Canterbury	2013	
Kōhatupapā / Ranfurly Bay	Ranfurly Bay	Bay	Northland	2017	
Kōkōwhai Bay / Turners Bay	Turners Bay	Bay	Marlborough	2013	
Korowai / Torlesse Tussocklands Park		Conservation Park	Canterbury		
Kurow Hill / Te Kohurau	Kurow Hill	Hill	Otago	1998	
Kutu Parera (Gaer Arm) Marine Reserve		Marine Reserve	Fiordland	2008	
Lake Alabaster / Wāwāhi Waka	Lake Alabaster	Lake	Otago	1998	
Lake Browning / Whakarewa	Lake Browning	Lake	West Coast	1998	
Lake Ellesmere / Te Waihora	Lake Ellesmere	Lake	Canterbury	1989	
Lake Grassmere / Kapara Te Hau	Lake Grassmere	Lake	Marlborough	1998	
Lake Ianthe / Matahi	Lake Ianthe	Lake	West Coast	1998	
Lake Karoro / Mathews	Lake Mathews	Lake	Northland	2002	
Lake McKerrow / Whakatipu Waitai	Lake McKerrow	Lake	Otago	1998	
Lake Ōkataina / Te Moana i kataina ā Te Rangitakaroro	Lake Okataina	Lake	Bay of Plenty	2006	
Lake Rotoiti / Te Roto kite ā Ihenga i ariki ai Kahu	Lake Rotoiti	Lake	Bay of Plenty	2006	
Lake Rotokākahi (Green Lake) Scenic Reserve		Conservation Area	Bay of Plenty	2009	While the name of the scenic reserve is official, the lake it is named after does not have an official name
Lake Rotoroa / Hamilton Lake	Hamilton Lake	Lake	Waikato	1974	
Lake Rotorua / Te Rotorua nui ā Kahumatamomoe	Lake Rotorua	Lake	Bay of Plenty	2006	
Leaning Rock / Haehaeata	Leaning Rock	Rock	Otago	1998	
Little Mangere Island (Tapuaenuku) The Fort	Little Mangere Island	Island	Chatham Islands	1982	
Little Mount Peel / Huatekerekere	Little Mount Peel	Mountain	Canterbury	1998	
Lords River / Tūtaekawetoweto	Lords River	River	Southland	1998	
Lyttelton Harbour / Whakaraupō	Lyttelton Harbour	Bay/Inlet	Canterbury	1998	
Mackenzie Pass / Manahuna	Mackenzie Pass	Mountain pass	Canterbury	1998	
Mahināpua Creek / Tūwharewhare	Mahināpua Creek	Stream	West Coast	1998	
Mākaro / Ward Island	Ward Island	Island	Wellington	2001	
Mākōtukutuku Stream / Washpool Creek		River	West Coast	2021	Previously unnamed
Manawatāwhi / Great Island	Great Island	Island	Northland	2005	
Manawatāwhi / Three Kings Islands	Three Kings Islands	Island group	Northland	2005	
Maniaiti / Benneydale	Benneydale	Town	Waikato		
Maniniaro / Angelus Peak	Angelus Peak	Hill	Nelson	2014	
Matapara / Pickersgill Island	Pickersgill Island	Island	Marlborough	2014	
Matira / Castle Rock	Castle Point	Point	Wellington	2011	
Matiu / Somes Island	Somes Island	Island	Wellington	1997	
Matukutūreia / McLaughlins Mountain	McLaughlins Mountain	Hill	Auckland	2014	
Maungakiekie / One Tree Hill	One Tree Hill	Hill	Auckland	2014	
Maungakura / Red Hill	Red Hill	Hill	Nelson	2011	
Maungarei / Mount Wellington	Mount Wellington	Hill	Auckland	2014	
Maungaroa / Blagdon Hill	Blagdon Hill	Hill	Taranaki	2017	
Maungawhau / Mount Eden	Mount Eden	Hill	Auckland	2014	
Meretoto / Ship Cove	Ship Cove	Bay	Marlborough	2014	
Milford Sound / Piopiotahi	Milford Sound	Fiord	Fiordland	1998	
Moana Uta (Wet Jacket Arm) Marine Reserve		Marine Reserve	Fiordland	2008	
Moana-whenua-pōuri / Edwardson Sound	Edwardson Sound	Fiord	Fiordland	2019	
Moekawa / South West Island	South West Island	Island	Northland	2013	
Moeraki Boulders / Kaihinaki	Moeraki Boulders	Geological formation	Otago	1998	
Moeraki Boulders / Kaihinaki Scenic Reserve	Moeraki Boulders Scenic Reserve	Scenic Reserve	Otago	2009	
Moeraki River / Blue River		River	Westland	2013	
Mokiiti / Little Moggy Island	Little Moggy Island	Island	Southland	2002	
Mokinui / Big Moggy Island	Big Moggy Island	Island	Southland	2002	
Motuareronui / Adele Island	Adele Island	Island	Nelson	2014	
Motuihe Island / Te Motu-a-Ihengotuihe	Motuihe Island	Island	Auckland	2014	
Motukauatiiti / Corsair Bay	Corsair Bay	Bay/Inlet	Canterbury	2003	Does not apply to Corsair Bay suburb.
Motukauatirahi / Cass Bay	Cass Bay	Bay/Inlet	Canterbury	2003	Does not apply to adjacent suburb.
Motukōkako Island / Piercy Island	Piercy Island	Island	Northland	1989	also known as "The Hole In The Rock"
Motumānawa / Pollen Island	Pollen Island	Island	Auckland	2015	
Motunau / Plate Island	Plate Island	Island	Bay of Plenty	1988	
Motunui / Edwards Island	Edwards Island	Island	Southland	2001	
Moturoa / Rabbit Island	Rabbit Island	Island	Nelson	2014	
Motutere / Castle Rock	Castle Rock	Hill	Waikato	2018	
Mount Alfred / Ari	Mount Alfred	Mountain	Otago	1998	
Mount Anglem / Hananui	Mount Anglem	Mountain	Southland	1998	
Mount Aspiring / Tititea	Mount Aspiring	Mountain	Otago	1998	
Mount Charles / Poatiri	Mount Charles	Mountain	Otago	1998	
Mount Diffenbach (Hemokawa)	Mount Diffenbach	Hill	Chatham Islands	1982	
Mount Earnslaw / Pikirakatahi	Mount Earnslaw	Mountain	Otago	1998	
Mount Grey / Maukatere	Mount Grey	Mountain	Canterbury	1998	
Mount Harman / Kaniere	Mount Harman	Mountain	West Coast	1998	
Mount Harper / Mahaanui	Mount Harper	Mountain	Canterbury	1998	
Mount Hauruia / Bald Rock	Bald Rock	Peak	Auckland	2003	
Mount Herbert / Te Ahu Pātiki	Mount Herbert	Mountain	Canterbury	1998	
Mount MacKenzie / Pakihiwitahi	Mount MacKenzie	Mountain	Otago	1998	
Mount Nimrod / Kaumira	Mount Nimrod	Mountain	Canterbury	1998	
Mount Upright / Te Taumata o Uekanuku	Mount Upright	Mountain	West Coast	1998	
Mount Watkin / Hikaroroa	Mount Watkin	Mountain	Otago	1998	
Moutere Hauriri / Bounty Islands Marine Reserve		Marine Reserve	Subantarctic islands	2014	
Moutere Ihupuku / Campbell Island Marine Reserve		Marine Reserve	Subantarctic islands	2014	
Moutere Mahue / Antipodes Island Marine Reserve		Marine Reserve	Subantarctic islands	2014	
Muhuaka / Capstan Rock	Capstan Rock	Island	Hawke's Bay	2018	
Musick Point / Te Naupata	Musick Point	Point	Auckland	2018	
Mutukaroa / Hamlin Hill	Hamlin Hill	Hill	Auckland	2014	
New River / Kaimata	New River	River	West Coast	1998	
Ngā Atua Tātā / Kerr Point	Kerr Point	Point	Northland	2015	
Ngā Kiore / Jag Rocks	Jag Rocks	Island group	Nelson	1983	
Ngā Motu / Sugar Loaf Islands	Sugar Loaf Islands	Island group	Taranaki	1999	
Ngataea / Hooper Point	Hooper Point	Point	Northland	2015	
Nine Mile Creek / Kotorepi	Nine Mile Creek	Stream	West Coast	1998	
North Branch Ashburton River / Hakatere	North Branch Ashburton River	River	Canterbury	1998	
North-East Reef (Terangi-taumaewa)	North-East Reef	Reef	Chatham Islands	1982	
Ōhau / West Island	West Island	Island	Northland	2015	
Ōhinerau / Mount Hobson	Mount Hobson	Hill	Auckland	2014	
Ōhuiarangi / Pigeon Mountain	Pigeon Mountain	Hill	Auckland	2014	
Ōkāritoiti / Lake Windermere	Lake Windermere	Lake	West Coast	2010	
Old Man Range / Kopuwai	Old Man Range	Mountain range	Otago	1998	
Omarupapako / Round Bush Scenic Reserve	Round Bush Scenic Reserve	Conservation area	Otago	1998	
Ōmawete / Coopers Knob	Coopers Knob	Hill	Canterbury	2020	
Ōparapara / Samson Bay		Bay	Nelson	2021	
Ōraumoa / Fighting Bay	Fighting Bay	Bay	Marlborough	2014	
Oromaki / North East Island	North East Island	Island	Northland	2005	
Ōrongomai / Cass Peak	Cass Peak	Hill	Canterbury	2020	
Ōtāhuhu / Mount Richmond	Mount Richmond	Volcanic cone	Auckland	2014	
Ōtaipango / Henderson Bay	Henderson Bay	Bay	Northland	2015	
Ōtamahua / Quail Island	Quail Island	Island	Canterbury	2003	
Ōtānerua / Hatfields Beach	Hatfields Beach	Beach	Auckland	2013	Name does not apply to the adjacent settlement
Ōtokitoki / Gollans Bay	Gollans Bay	Bay/inlet	Canterbury	2003	
Otututu / Rough River	Rough River	River	West Coast	1987	
Paengarēhia / Twilight Beach	Twilight Beach	Beach	Northland	2015	
Paepae-o-Tū / Bream Tail	Bream Tail	Point	Northland	2012	
Pāhātea / Durden Hill	Durden Hill	Hill	Otago	2007	
Pana / Blind Jims Creek	Blind Jims Creek	Creek	Chatham Islands	2021	
Papawhero / Mount Moturoa	Mount Moturoa	Hill	Taranaki	2017	
Pariroa / Castle Mount	Castle Mount	Mountain	Southland	2013	
Pariwhero / Red Rocks	Red Rocks	Rock	Wellington	2009	
Pātakanui Stream / Grannys Creek		Stream	Wellington	2021	
Paterson Inlet / Whaka a Te Wera	Paterson Inlet (North and South West Arms)	Bay/Inlet	Southland	1998	
Pāuakaiwawe / McLarens Bay	McLarens Bay	Bay/Inlet	Nelson	1983	
Pelorus Sound / Te Hoiere	Pelorus Sound	Sound	Marlborough	2014	
Pig Island / Mātau	Pig Island	Island	Otago	1998	
Pigeon Island / Wāwāhi Waka	Pigeon Island	Island	Otago	1998	
Pikikirunga / Caanan Downs	Caanan Downs	Downs	Nelson	2014	
Pikimai / Church Hill	Church Hill	Hill	Nelson	2014	
Piopiotahi (Milford Sound) Marine Reserve		Marine Reserve	Fiordland	1993	
Pīreka / Low Neck Bay	Low Neck Bay	Bay/Inlet	Nelson	1983	
Pitt Island (Rangiauria)	Pitt Island	Island	Chatham Islands	1982	
Piwhane / Spirits Bay	Spirits Bay	Bay/Inlet	Northland	2005	
Pōhatu / Flea Bay	Flea Bay	Bay/Inlet	Canterbury	2003	Known for Pōhatu Marine Reserve
Port Hutt (Whangaroa Harbour)	Port Hutt	Harbour	Chatham Islands	1982	
Port Levy (Potiriwi) / Koukourarata	Port Levy (Potiriwi)	Bay/Inlet	Canterbury	1998	
Port Pegasus / Pikihatiti	Port Pegasus	Bay/Inlet	Southland	1998	
Port William / Potirepo	Port William	Bay/Inlet	Southland	1998	
Poukirikiri / Travers Saddle	Travers Saddle	Saddle	Nelson	2014	
Pourangahau / Mount Robert	Mount Robert	Hill	Nelson	2014	
Puhi Kai Iti / Cook Landing National Historic Reserve	Cook Landing (Gisborne)	Historic Reserve	Gisborne		
Pukaha / Mount Bruce	Mount Bruce	Hill	Wellington		
Pūkākā / Marsland Hill	Marsland Hill	Hill	Taranaki	2017	
Pukatea / Whites Bay	Whites Bay	Bay	Marlborough	2014	
Pukeahurangi / Jumbo	Jumbo	Hill	Wellington	2017	
Pukeamoamo / Mitre	Mitre	Mountain	Wellington	2017	
Pukeatua / Dyers Pass	Dyers Pass	Pass	Canterbury	2020	
Pukehīnau / Shellback Stream	Shellback Stream	Stream	Waikato	1974	
Pukeone / Mount Campbell	Mount Campbell	Hill	Nelson	2014	
Pukepohatu / Bald Rock	Bald Rock	Rock	Northland	2002	
Puketuroto / Hoopers Canyon	Hoopers Canyon	Undersea Canyon	Otago	2014	
Puketuroto / Hoopers Channel	Hoopers Channel	Sea channel	Otago	2014	
Pūkorokoro / Miranda	Miranda	Locality	Waikato	2015	
Pūotewheke / Scuffle Island	Scuffle Island	Island	Nelson	1983	
Puroa / Boar Hill	Boar Hill	Hill	Northland	2002	
The Pyramid (Tarakoikoia)	The Pyramid	Island	Chatham Islands	1982	
Quarantine Island / Kamau Taurua	Quarantine Island	Island	Otago	1998	
Queen Charlotte Sound / Tōtaranui	Queen Charlotte Sound	Sound	Marlborough	2014	
Rākauroa / Torrent Bay	Torrent Bay	Bay	Nelson	2014	
Rakituma / Preservation Inlet	Preservation Inlet	Bay	Southalnd	2019	
Rangihokopoi / Western Reef	Western Reef	Reef	Chatham Islands	2021	
Rangitoto ki te Tonga / D'Urville Island	D'Urville Island	Island	Marlborough	2008	
Rangituhi / Colonial Knob	Colonial Knob	Hill	Wellington	2014	
Rarotonga / Mount Smart	Mount Smart	Hill	Auckland	2014	
Red Mercury Island (Whakau) Scenic Reserve		Conservation Area	Coromandel	2019	
Refuge Island / Takataka	Refuge Island	Island	West Coast	1998	
Repanga (Cuvier) Island Nature Reserve		Conservation Area	Coromandel	2009	
Rerewhakaupoko Island / Solomon	Solomon Island	Island	Southland	1998	
Riverton / Aparima	Riverton	Township	Southland	1998	
Rocky Point / Tauotikirangi	Rocky Point	Headland	West Coast	1998	
Rocky Point / Tauotikirangi Scenic Reserve		Conservation Area	West Coast	1998	
Rotokare / Barrett Lagoon	Barrett Lagoon	Lake	Taranaki	2014	
Rotokura / Cable Bay	Cable Bay	Bay	Nelson	2014	
Rotomairewhenua / Blue Lake	Blue Lake	Lake	Nelson	2014	
Rotomaninitua / Lake Angelus	Lake Angelus	Lake	Nelson	2014	
Rotopōhueroa / Lake Constance	Lake Constance	Lake	Nelson	2014	
Round Rock (Rangituka)	Round Rock	Rock	Chatham Islands	1982	
Ruakōura / Perpendicular Point	Perpendicular Point	Point	Northland	2015	
Second Water Creek / Waipāpaku		Creek	Chatham Islands	2009	
Selwyn River / Waikirikiri	Selwyn River	River	Canterbury	1998	
Separation Point / Te Matau	Separation Point	Point	Nelson	2014	
Seven Mile Creek / Waimatuku	Seven Mile Creek	Stream	West Coast	1998	
Shag Point / Matakaea	Shag Point	Headland	Otago	1998	
Shag Point / Matakaea Scientific Reserve	Shag Point Scientific Reserve	Conservation Area	Otago	2009	
Ship Cone / Ōtaupiri	Ship Cone	Hill	Southland	1998	
Sinclair Head / Te Rimurapa	Sinclair Head	Headland	Wellington	2009	
Snares Islands / Tini Heke	Snares Islands	Island group	Subantarctic islands	1998	
Solander Island / Hautere	Solander Island	Island	Southland	1980	
South Branch Ashburton River / Hakatere	South Branch Ashburton River	River	Canterbury	1998	
South Cape / Whiore	South Cape	Headland	Southland	1998	
South East Island (Rangatira)	South East Island	Island	Chatham Islands	1982	
South West Cape / Puhiwaero	South West Cape	Headland	Southland	1998	
Southern Alps / Kā Tiritiri o te Moana	Southern Alps	Mountain range	Canterbury	1998	
Spy Glass Point / Piripāua	Spy Glass Point	Headland	Marlborough	1975	
Steeple Rock / Te Aroaro-o-Kupe	Steeple Rock	Rock	Wellington	2009	
Stewart Island / Rakiura	Stewart Island	Island	Southland	1998	
Tāhoro / Union Bay	Union Bay	Bay	Auckland	2015	
Taiari / Chalky Inlet	Chalky Inlet	Fiord	Fiordland	2019	
Taieri Island / Moturata	Taieri Island	Island	Otago	1998	
Taiporoporo / Charles Sound	Charles Sound	Fiord	Fiordland	2019	
Taitetimu / Caswell Sound	Caswell Sound	Fiord	Fiordland	2019	
Taitimu / Caswell Ridge	Caswell High	Undersea ridge	Southland	2014	
Takapaukura / Tom Bowling Bay	Tom Bowling Bay	Bay	Northland	2015	
Takapōtaka / Attempt Hill	Attempt Hill	Hill	Marlborough	2014	
Takarunga / Mount Victoria	Mount Victoria	Hill	Auckland	2014	
Taki-a-Maru / Fish Reef	Fish Reef	Reef	Otago	1985	
Tamatea / Dusky Sound	Dusky Sound	Fiord	Southland	2019	
Tāpoa / Erskine Point	Erskine Point	Headland	Canterbury	1949/2003	
Tapuae-o-Uenuku / Hector Mountains	Hector Mountains	Mountain Range	Otago	2013	
Tapuwaeharuru / Evans Pass	Evans Pass	Pass	Canterbury	2020	
Tasman Bay / Te Tai-o-Aorere	Tasman Bay	Bay	Tasman	2014	
Tauhinukorokio / Mount Pleasant	Mount Pleasant	Hill	Canterbury	1949/2003	Does not apply to suburb of Christchurch.
Taukihepa / Big South Cape Island	Big South Cape Island	Island	Southland	2001	
Taurere / Taylor Hill	Taylors Hill	Volcanic cone	Auckland	unofficial	
Tawhitikurī / Goat Point	Goat Point	Point	Wellington	2014	
Te Akaroa / West Entry Point	West Entry Point	Headland	Nelson	1979	
Te Ākau / Black Beach	Black Beach	Beach	Nelson	1983	
Te Anamāhanga / Port Gore	Port Gore	Bay	Marlborough	2014	
Te Aumiti / French Pass	French Pass	Channel	Nelson	1983	
Te Awa Kairangi / Hutt River	Hutt River	River	Wellington	2010	
Te Awa-o-Tū / Thompson Sound	Thompson Sound	Fiord	Fiordland	2019	
Te Awaroa / Long Sound	Long Sound	Fiord	Southland	2019	
Te Hāpua / Sutherland Sound	Sutherland Sound	Fiord	Fiordland	2019	
Te Hapua (Sutherland Sound) Marine Reserve		Marine Reserve	Fiordland	2008	
Te Hauturu-o-Toi / Little Barrier Island	Little Barrier Island	Island	Auckland	2019	
Te Hauturu-o-Toi / Little Barrier Island Nature Reserve	Little Barrier Island Nature Reserve	Conservation Area	Auckland	2019	
Te Hāwere-a-Maki / Goat Island	Goat Island	Island	Auckland	2012	
Te Henga / Bethells Beach	Bethells Beach	Beach	Auckland	1979	
Te Heru o Kahukura / Sugarloaf	Sugarloaf	Hill	Canterbury	2020	
Te Hoiere / Pelorus River	Pelorus River	Stream	Marlborough	2014	
Te Horowai / Speargrass Creek	Speargrass Creek	Creek	Nelson	2014	
Te Houhou / George Sound	George Sound	Fiord	Fiordland	2019	
Te Kā-a-Maki / Jackie Hill	Jackie Hill	Hill	Auckland	2015	
Te Kauparenui / Gowan River	Gowan River	Stream	Nelson	2014	
Te Kōhanga / Shipwreck Bay	Shipwreck Bay	Bay	Northland	2015	
Te Kohuroa / Mathesons Bay	Mathesons Bay	Bay	Auckland	2015	
Te Koko-o-Kupe / Cloudy Bay	Cloudy Bay	Bay	Marlborough	2014	
Te Korowhakaunu / Kanáris Sound	Cunaris Sound	Fiord	Fiordland	2019	Spelling of the European portion was updated in 2021 from Cunaris to Kanáris
Te Kuri a Paoa/Young Nick’s Head National Historic Reserve	Young Nick’s Head	Historic Reserve	Gisborne	2012	
Te Mamaku / Ruby Bay	Ruby Bay	Bay	Nelson	2014	
Te Moenga-o-Wheke / The Tors	The Tors	Hill	Canterbury	2020	
Te Motu Kairangi / Miramar Peninsula	Miramar Peninsula	Peninsula	Wellington	2010	
Te Motu-o-Kura / Bare Island	Bare Island	Island	Hawke's Bay	2018	
Te Onepoto / Taylors Mistake	Taylors Mistake	Locality	Canterbury	1949/2003	The dual name applies to the locality, not the bay, which is still known as Taylors Mistake.
Te Oneroa-a-Tōhē / Ninety Mile Beach	Ninety Mile Beach	Beach	Northland	1992	
Te Paepae o Aotea (Volkner Rocks) Marine Reserve		Marine Reserve	Bay of Plenty	2006	
Te Piaka / Adderley Head	Adderley Head	Headland	Canterbury	2020	
Te Pōhue / Camp Bay	Camp Bay	Bay/Inlet	Canterbury	2003	
Te Pokohiwi / Boulder Bank	Boulder Bank	Barrier island	Nelson	2014	
Te Poporo / Bulli Point	Bulli Point	Point	Waikato	2014	
Te Puaitaha / Breaksea Sound	Breaksea Sound	Fiord	Fiordland	2019	
Te Rā / Dagg Sound	Dagg Sound	Fiord	Fiordland	2019	
Te Rau-o-te-Huia / Mount Donald McLean	Mount Donald McLean	Hill	Auckland	2015	
Te Tapuwae o Hua (Long Sound) Marine Reserve		Marine Reserve	Fiordland	2006	
Te Tara-o-Te-Marama / Mount Freeth	Mount Freeth	Hill	Marlborough	2015	
Te Tihi-o-Kahukura / Castle Rock	Castle Rock	Rock outcrop	Canterbury	2020	
Te Toka-Tapu-a-Kupe / Ninepin Rock	Ninepin Rock	Rock outcrop	Auckland	2014	
Te Tōwaka Bay / Burnside Bay		Bay	Marlborough	2021	
Te Umukuri / Wellers Rock	Wellers Rock	Rock	Otago	1987	
Te Unuhanga-a-Rangitoto / Mercer Bay	Mercer Bay	Bay	Auckland	2014	
Te Upoko-o-Kurī / Witch Hill	Witch Hill	Hill	Canterbury	2020	
Te Wai-o-Pareira / Henderson Creek	Henderson Creek	Creek	Auckland	2015	
Te Waipapa / Diamond Harbour	Diamond Harbour	Bay	Canterbury	2003	Name does not apply to the town
Te Waiu o Pukemaire / Braemar Springs	Braemar Springs	Creek	Bay of Plenty	2005	
Te Whakahewa / The Horns	The Horns	Point	Chatham Islands	1982	
Te Whanganui / Port Underwood	Port Underwood	Bay	Marlborough	2014	
Te Wharau / Charteris Bay	Charteris Bay	Bay/Inlet	Canterbury	2003	
Te Whatu / Berghan Point	Berghan Point	Point	Northland	2017	
Ten Mile Creek / Waianiwaniwa	Ten Mile Creek	Stream	West Coast	1998	
The Bluff / Motupōhue	The Bluff (Bluff Hill)	Hill	Southland	1998	Located in Bluff
The Castle (Rangiwheau)	The Castle	Island	Chatham Islands	1982	
The Doughboy / Kokiraki	The Doughboy	Hill	West Coast	1998	
The Pyramid (Tarakoikoia)	The Pyramid	Island	Chatham Islands	1982	
The Sisters / Rangitatahi	The Sisters	Island	Chatham Islands	1982	
Tia Island / Entrance		Island	Southland	1998	
Tikitapu / Blue Lake	Lake Tikitapu (Blue Lake)	Lake	Bay of Plenty	2006	
Timore Island / Chimneys		Island	Southland	1998	
Tiriparepa / Scott Point	Scott Point	Point	Northland	2015	
Titeremoana (Pudding Island) Scenic Reserve		Conservation Area	Otago	2009	
Tītī / Muttonbird Islands	Muttonbird Islands	Island group	Southland	1998	
Tohoraha / Mount Camel	Mount Camel	Hill	Northland	2015	
Tokangawhā / Split Apple Rock	Split Apple Rock	Rock	Nelson	2014	
Tokomaru / Mount Robertson	Mount Robertson	Hill	Marlborough	2014	
Tory Channel / Kura Te Au	Tory Channel	Sound	Marlborough	2014	
Tūranganui-a-Kiwa / Poverty Bay	Poverty Bay	Bay	Gisborne	2019	
Tū Āraiawa Island / Fin Island	Fin Island	Island	Nelson	1983	
Waerenga / Mission Bay	Mission Bay	Bay	Bay of Plenty	2006	
Waiau Toa / Clarence River	Clarence River	Stream	Marlborough	2018	
Waihemo / Shag River	Shag River	River	Otago	1985	
Waikawau / Hannahs Bay	Hannahs Bay	Bay	Bay of Plenty	2006	
Waikutakuta / Robin Hood Bay	Robin Hood Bay	Bay	Marlborough	2014	
Waingaehe / Holdens Bay	Holdens Bay	Bay	Bay of Plenty	2006	
Waimihia / Point Alison	Point Alison	Point	Chatham Islands	2021	
Waipaparoa / Howick Beach	Howick Beach	Beach	Auckland	2018	
Wairēinga / Bridal Veil Falls	Bridal Veil Falls	Waterfall	Waikato	2008	
Waitata / Little Port Cooper	Little Port Cooper	Bay/Inlet	Canterbury	2003	
Watchman Island / Te Kākāwhakaara	Watchman Island	Island	Auckland	2015	
Wellington Harbour / Port Nicholson	Port Nicholson	Harbour	Wellington	1984	
Westland Tai Poutini National Park	Westland National Park	National park	West Coast	1998	
Whakaari / White Island	White Island	Island	Bay of Plenty	1998	
Whakaari / White Island Canyon	White Island Canyon	Undersea Canyon	Bay of Plenty	2016	
Whakapaingarara / Tapu Bush	Tapu Bush	Bush	Northland	2002	
Whakapirau / Rocky Point	Rocky Point	Point	Northland	2002	
Whangākea / Pandora	Pandora	Locality	Northland	2015	
Whangaokeno / East Island	East Island	Island	Gisborne	2009	
Wharekahika / Hicks Bay	Hicks Bay	Bay	East Cape	2019	
Wharekāpu / Paxton Point	Paxton Point	Point	Northland	2015	
Wharepapa / Arthur Range	Arthur Range	Range	Nelson	2014	
Whiorau / Lowry Bay	Lowry Bay	Bay	Wellington	2009	
White Bluffs / Te Parinui o Whiti	White Bluffs	Bluffs	Marlborough	1998	
Whitireia / Mount Couper	Mount Couper	Hill	Wellington	2007	
Young Nicks Head / Te Kurī		Point	Gisborne	2013	

== List of unofficial dual names ==
Dual name	Type of place	Region	Year recorded	Notes
Ahukawakawa (Sphagnum Moss Swamp)	Wetland	Taranaki	2013	
Ahuru (Eastern Reef)	Rock	Chatham Islands	2018	
Allen Strait / Guards Pass	Channel	Marlborough	2013	
Aratira / The Drop Scene	Site	Manawatū	2013	
Arrow Rock / Fifeshire Rock	Island	Nelson	2013	
Bay of Many Coves / Miritū Bay	Bay	Marlborough	2013	
Beehive Island / Taungamaro Island	Island	Auckland	2013	
Black Rocks / Barrel Rocks	Rock	Northland	2013	
Boyds Bush / Kaimoko	Bush	Hawkes Bay	2015	
Brodies Creek / Kauhoehoe Stream	Stream	Northland	2013	
Broken Islands / Pig Islands	Island	Coromandel	2013	
Browns Island (Motukorea)	Island	Auckland	2013	
Bullendale / The Reefs	Locality	Otago	2013	
Calypso Bay / Ōtamarau Bay	Bay	Auckland	2019	
Camp Bay / Tarata	Bay	Nelson	2013	
Cascade / Kauri	Forest	Auckland	2015	
Cathedral Rock / Moturoa	Island	Coromandel	2013	
Challenger Island / Little Kawau Island	Island	North Auckland	2013	
Clutha River / Koau Branch	Stream	Otago	2016	
Clutha River / Matau Branch	Stream	Otago	2016	
Coal Stream / Gold Creek	Stream	Gisborne	2013	
Cone Rock / Horoiwi	Island	North Auckland	2013	
Cuvier Island (Repanga Island)	Island	North Auckland	2013	
Dog Island / Motuwhangaikirehe Island	Island	Northland	2013	
Double Island / Moturehu	Island	Coromandel	2013	
Dry Creek / Little Man River	Stream	Westland	2013	
Eastern Waiotauru / Snowy River	Stream	Wellington	2013	
Flat Island / Motueka Island	Island	Northland	2013	
Forsyth Island / Te Paruparu	Island	Marlborough	2013	
French Bay / Otitori Bay	Bay	Auckland	2013	Name does not refer to the suburb
French Pass / Anaru	Locality	Nelson	2013	Name does not refer to the channel
Godsiff Bay / Matai	Bay	Marlborough	2013	
Goldsborough / Waimea	Locality	Westland	2013	
Great Barrier Island (Aotea Island)	Island	North Auckland	2013	
Great Mercury Island (Ahuahu)	Island	Coromandel	2013	
Green Point / Pungawiriwiri	Point	Northland	2013	
Greenstone / Pounamu	Locality	Westland	2013	
Halfmoon Bay / Oban	Locality	Southland	2013	
Hatu Patu / Wishing Rock	Rock	Bay of Plenty	2013	
Horuhoru Rock (Gannet Rock)	Rock	North Auckland	2013	
Island Bay / Huritini	Bay	Nelson	2013	
Kaikōura Island / Selwyn Island	Island	Coromandel	2013	
Kaimanawa / Three Kings	Hill	Manawatū	2013	
Kairara Rock / Dukes Nose	Rock	Northland	2013	
Kākāpōtahi River / Little Waitaha River	Stream	Westland	2013	
Karamea / Red Island	Island	Hawkes Bay	2013	
Karatia / Thoms Landing	Locality	North Auckland	2013	
Kauaeparāoa Stream / Te Paki Stream	Stream	Northland	2013	
Kohinga / Bonny Mary	Hill	Hawkes Bay	2013	
Kōkota / The Sandspit	Peninsula	Northland	2013	
Komahunga Bay / Mona Bay	Bay	North Auckland	2013	
Kotanui Island / Frenchmans Cap	Island	North Auckland	2013	
Lake Brunner / Moana	Lake	Westland	1992	
Lake Forsyth / Wairewa	Lake	Canterbury	1995	
Lake Rotokākahi / Green Lake	Lake	Bay of Plenty	1982	
Lake Rotongata / Mirror Lake	Lake	Bay of Plenty	1988	
Lake Taupō / Taupōmoana	Lake	Bay of Plenty	2013	
Long Point / Taramahiti Point	Point	Hawke's Bay	2013	
Flat Island / Motueka Island	Island	Northland	2021	
Lottin Point / Wakatiri	Point	Gisborne	2013	
Mahuki Island / Anvil Island	Island	Coromandel	2013	
Māhungarape Island / Round Island	Island	Coromandel	2013	
Mahurangi Island (Goat Island)	Island	Coromandel	2013	
Mahuraunui Stream / Stoney Creek	Stream	Hawke's Bay	2013	
Makawhio River / Jacobs River	Stream	Westland	2013	
Mākiekie / Coal Creek	Stream	Wellington	2013	
Man of War Passage / Governor Pass	Channel	Coromandel	2013	
Man-o-War Bay / Pāharakeke	Bay	Nelson	2013	
Martello Rock / Ruakōura	Island	North Auckland	2013	
Matakana Point / Flax Point	Point	Bay of Plenty	2013	
Mataora / Round Rock	Island	Taranaki	2013	
Matihe Point / Beacon Point	Point	Bay of Plenty	2013	
Maumaupaki / Camels Back	Hill	South Auckland	2013	
Maunganui Point / Separation Point	Point	North Auckland	2013	
Mayor Island / Tūhua	Island	South Auckland	2013	
Milburns Pond / Victoria Dam	Lake	Otago	2013	
Moeraki River / Blue River	Stream	Westland	2013	
Motu Wai Island / Red Island	Island	Northland	2013	
Motueka Island (Pigeon Island)	Island	Coromandel	2013	
Motuhaku Island / Schooner Rocks	Island	South Auckland	2013	
Motuhara (Bertier or the Forty Fours)	Island	Chatham Islands	2013	
Motukahaua Island (Happy Jack Island)	Island	Coromandel	2013	
Motukakarikitahi Island (Rat island)	Island	Coromandel	2013	
Motukaramarama Island (Bush Island)	Island	Coromandel	2013	
Motukaramea Island / Kaikai Island	Island	Coromandel	2013	
Motukawaiti Island / Step Island	Island	Northland	2013	
Motukēhua Island / Nops Island	Island	Northland	2013	
Motukōrure Island / Centre Island	Island	Coromandel	2013	
Motumāhanga / Saddleback	Island	Taranaki	2013	
Motumorirau Island / Pauls Island	Island	Coromandel	2013	
Motungārara Island / Fishermans Island	Island	Wellington	2013	
Motuokino Island / Shag Rock	Island	Coromandel	2013	
Motuopae Island / Peach Island	Island	Bay of Plenty	2013	
Motuopuhi Island / Rat Island	Island	Bay of Plenty	2013	
Motuoruhi Island (Goat Island)	Island	Coromandel	2013	
Motuotamatea / Snapper Rock	Island	Taranaki	2013	
Motupapa Island / Cocked Hat Island	Island	Northland	2013	
Motupohukuo Island (Turkey Island)	Island	Coromandel	2013	
Motupotaka (Black Rocks)	Island	Coromandel	2013	
Moturoa Island (Tower Rock)	Island	Coromandel	2013	
Moturua Island (Rabbit Island)	Island	Coromandel	2013	
Motutākupu Island / Gannet Island	Island	Coromandel	2013	
Motutara Island / Henry Island	Island	North Auckland	2013	
Motuwi Island (Double Island)	Island	South Auckland	2013	
Motuwinukenuke Island / Square Island	Island	Coromandel	2013	
Mount Hicks / Saint Davids Dome	Hill	Westland, Canterbury	2013	
Mount Humphries (Whakaihuwaka)	Hill	Taranaki	2013	
Nelson Island / Peter Island	Island	North Auckland	2013	
Nelsons Monument / Kaitaore	Island	Nelson	2013	
Nga Puna a Tama / The Springs of Tama	Spring	Wellington	2013	
Ngaawapurua / Harkness Stream	Stream	Hawke's Bay	2013	
Ngamotukaraka Islands / Three Kings Islands	Island	Coromandel	2013	
Ngawaiawhitu / Poverty Creek Stream	Stream	Hawkes Bay	2013	
Ngawhakatara / The Lady	Hill	Waikato	2013	
North Cape / Otou	Point	Northland	2013	
North West Bay / Oira	Bay	South Auckland	2013	
Ōhinetamatea River / Saltwater Creek	Stream	Westland	2013	
Ōkiore Point / Rugged Point	Point	Northland	2013	
Okokewa Island / Green Island	Island	Auckland	2013	
Oneura Bay / Red Cliff Cove	Bay	Auckland	2013	
Ōrarapa Island / The Haystack	Island	Auckland	2013	
Ōrere Point / Rangipākihi	Point	Auckland	2013	
Ōtehe / Crayfish Point	Point	Waikato	2013	
Pakikauokiwi / Black Rock	Rock	Nelson	2013	
Panetiki Island / The Outpost	Island	North Auckland	2013	
Panoko Stream / Gold Creek	Stream	Wellington	2013	
Papakōhatu Island / Crusoe Island	Island	North Auckland	2013	
Papatara Bay / Horseshoe Bay	Bay	Auckland	2013	
Paradise Bay / Oneura Bay	Bay	Northland	2013	
Pararaki / Seagull Rock	Island	Taranaki	2013	
Park Point / Te Roreomaiaea	Point	Auckland	2013	
Pātītī Island / Banded Island	Island	Bay of Plenty	2013	
Pembles Island / Tangaroa	Island	Auckland	2013	
Point Ellis / Ōtara Point	Point	Auckland	2013	
Ponui Island / Chamberlins Island	Island	Auckland	2013	
Pukeatua Stream / Roaring Meg	Stream	Wellington	2013	
Pukekawa / Auckland Domain	Hill	Auckland	2022	
Quoin Island / Graves Island	Island	Auckland	2013	
Raglan Harbour (Whaingaroa)	Bay	Waikato	2013	
Rakitu Island (Arid Island)	Island	Auckland	2013	
Rangiahua Island (Flat Island)	Island	Coromandel	2013	
Rangiora Bay / Maukins Nook	Bay	Northland	2013	
Rarohara Bay / Ungunu Bay	Bay	Auckland	2013	
Red Mercury Island (Whakau)	Island	Coromandel	2013	
Reef Point / Kaiaua	Point	Nelson	2013	
Reef Point / Tūkari Point	Point	North Auckland	2013	
Riamaki / Upper Ruatiti	Locality	Wellington	2013	
Rileys Lookout / Panau Island	Island	Marlborough	2013	
Rocky Bay / Whakanewha Bay	Bay	Auckland	2013	
Rotowhero / Green Lake	Lake	Bay of Plenty	2013	
Ruakikeno Point / Tauranga	Point	Bay of Plenty	2013	
Ruatea / Paimai Stream	Stream	Bay of Plenty	2013	
Shoe Island / Motuhoa	Island	Coromandel	2013	
Slipper Island (Whakahau)	Island	Coromandel	2013	
South East Bay / Opo	Bay	Bay of Plenty	2013	
Star Keys (Motuhope)	Island	Chatham Islands	2013	
Stephens Island / Takapourewa	Island	Nelson	2013	
Stewart Island / Tekuru Kuru	Island	Nelson	2013	
Stony River (Hangatahua)	Stream	Taranaki	2013	
Tahoramaurea Island / Browns Island	Island	Wellington	2013	
Taikorai / Twin Rocks	Island	Hawke's Bay	2013	
Takahi Point / The Haystack	Point	Northland	2013	
Tapuaetahi Bay / Boat Harbour	Bay	Coromandel	2013	
Tarahiki Island / Shag Island	Island	Auckland	2013	
Taratara Point / Cake Island	Point	Auckland	2013	
Taupō Bay / West Bay	Bay	North Auckland	2013	
Tāwakewake Island / The Queen	Island	Bay of Plenty	2013	
Te Ekeatekonganui / Reef Point	Point	Nelson	2013	
Te Kaha Point / Mussel Rocks	Point	South Auckland	2013	
Te Kauangaomanaia / The Narrows	Channel	Gisborne	2013	
Te Matuku Bay / McLeods Bay	Bay	Auckland	2013	
Te Muka / Stalactite Falls	Waterfall	Hawke's Bay	2013	
Te Pirau Point / Jones Head	Point	Auckland	2013	
Teacup Island / Tūkoro	Island	South Auckland	2013	
The Beef Barrels / Kahikatoa	Rock	Nelson	2013	
The Haystack / Moturaka	Island	Marlborough	2013	
The Pigeons / Piroque Rocks	Island	North Auckland	2013	
The Twins (Motumanga)	Island	South Auckland	2013	
Thumb Point / Te Patu Point	Point	North Auckland	2013	
Tīheru Island / The Dog	Island	Northland	2013	
Tokananohia Reef / True Love Reef	Reef	Northland	2013	
Tokomāpuna / Barrett Reef	Island	Taranaki	2013	
Tokomāpuna Island / Aeroplane Island	Island	Wellington	2013	
Torea Bay / Torea Moua	Bay	Marlborough	2013	
Toroa Point / Gull Point	Point	North Auckland	2013	
Treble Tree Point / Ōtūhoto	Point	Nelson	2013	
Trio Islands / Kuru Pongi	Island	Nelson	2013	
Tutukākā Head / South Gable	Point	North Auckland	2013	
Victory Island / Moutītī	Island	Nelson	2013	
Waikaranga / Seal Rocks	Island	Taranaki	2013	
Waipuna Caves / Moa bone cave	Cave	Manawatū	2013	
Wairaomoana / Wairau Arm	Bay	Gisborne	2013	
Warea River (Teikaparua)	Stream	Taranaki	2013	
Wekarua Island / Sugar Loaf	Island	Northland	2013	
Western Bay / Ōmapu	Bay	Bay of Plenty	2013	
Whakataratara / Māori Chief	Point	Bay of Plenty	2013	
Whanawhana / The Fort	Hill	Hawke's Bay	2013	
Whāngioterangi / Echo Lake	Lake	Bay of Plenty	2013	
Wharenoa / Cemetery Island	Island	Nelson	2013	
Whareumu / Lion Rock	Island	Taranaki	2013	

== See also ==
- List of New Zealand places named by James Cook
