= Saltwater Creek =

Saltwater Creek may refer to the following:

== Australia ==
- Saltwater Creek (Gold Coast), Queensland
- Saltwater Creek (Moreton Bay), Queensland
- Saltwater River, Tasmania; also known as Saltwater Creek

== New Zealand ==
- Saltwater Creek, New Zealand, a locality in Waimakariri District
- Ōhinetamatea River / Saltwater Creek, a river on the West Coast
