= Mount McKenzie =

Mount McKenzie, Mount MacKenzie or Mount Mackenzie may refer to:

- Mount McKenzie (Antarctica), a peak in the Amery Peaks in Mac. Robertson Land, Antarctica
- Mount McKenzie, South Australia, a locality in the Barossa Valley
- Mount MacKenzie, a volcanic peak northeast of Hagensborg, British Columbia, Canada
- Mount Mackenzie, a mountain southeast of Revelstoke, British Columbia, Canada
- Mount Mackenzie King, a peak in the Premier Range of the Cariboo Mountains in east-central British Columbia, Canada
- Mount MacKenzie / Pakihiwitahi, a hill in Otago, New Zealand
- McKenzie Nunatak in Victoria land, Antarctica
- McKenzie Peak, Mac. Robertson Land, Antarctica
