= Challenger Island =

Challenger Island can refer to the following

- Challenger Island / Little Kawau Island, an island in the Auckland Region, New Zealand
- Challenger Island, an island off the coast of Murray Island in Antarctica
