= Mount Watkins =

Mount Watkins may refer to:

- Mount Watkins (California), a U.S. peak in Yosemite National Park named after Carleton Watkins
- Mount Watkin / Hikaroroa, a peak in New Zealand
