= French Pass Lighthouse =

Lighthouse in New Zealand

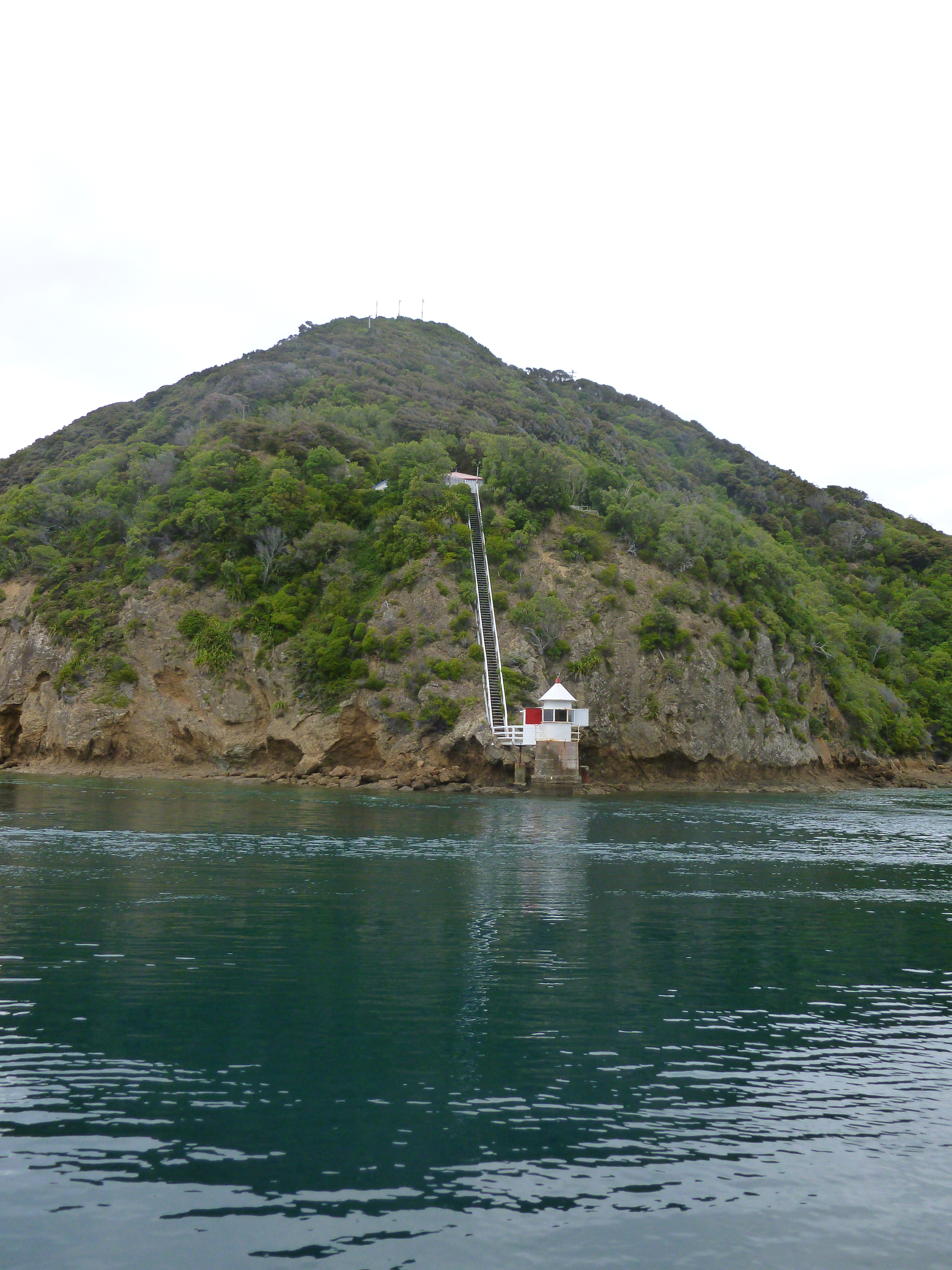
- Location: At top of South Island, opposite Rangitoto ki te Tonga / D’Urville Island
- Coordinates: 40°55′27″S 173°50′08″E

Tower
- Constructed: 1884
- Construction: cast iron tower
- Automated: 1961
- Height: 7 metres (23 ft)
- Shape: white house
- Operator: Maritime New Zealand

Light
- First lit: 1884
- Focal height: 3 metres (9.8 ft)
- Lens: drum type
- Light source: incandescent bulb
- Intensity: 50-watt
- Range: 10 nautical miles (19 km; 12 mi) white sector, 7 nautical miles (13 km; 8.1 mi) red sector
- Characteristic: Fixed light with red and white sectors

The French Pass Lighthouse together with a stone beacon mark a channel through the turbulent waters between Rangitoto ki te Tonga / D’Urville Island and the South Island. The New Zealand List of Lights calls the lighthouse Channel Point.

Standing at an elevation of 3 metres (9.8 ft) above sea level, it is New Zealand's lowest lighthouse. Even its companion beacon, placed on the outer edge of the reef, is higher, with an elevation of 5 metres (16 ft).

Its formal identifiers are ARLHS: NZL-024 - Admiralty: K4238 - NGA: 5028.

== Tidal stream ==
Te Aumiti / French Pass has the fastest tidal flows in New Zealand, hence the need for a lighthouse and channel beacon. The tidal stream changes from direction four times a day and does not follow the channel. At equinoctial spring tide the north-east-going stream has been known to reach 8 knots (4 m/s or 8.5 knots (15.7 km/h; 9.8 mph) and the south-west-going stream 8.5 knots (15.7 km/h; 9.8 mph). Neap tide rates are less, but still strong. A daily table of times is published by Toitū Te Whenua Land Information New Zealand (LINZ)

The tide times listed are the time of, apparent, slack water, and the NE and SW directions listed are the direction the tide will start to flow towards at the time listed. The change does not coincide with low water or high water at nearby Elmslie Bay.

== Navigation ==
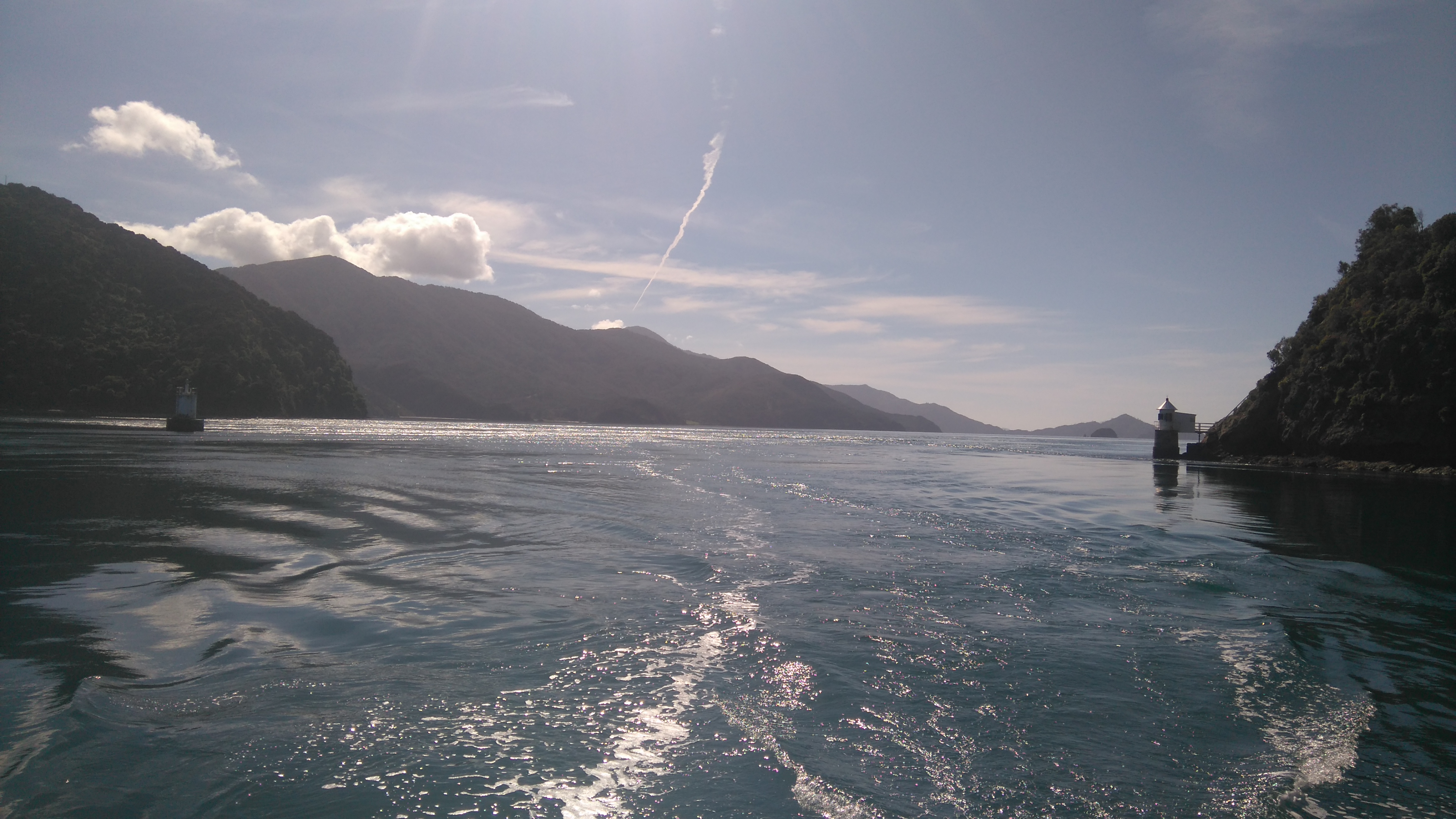
Approach to French Pass from south west

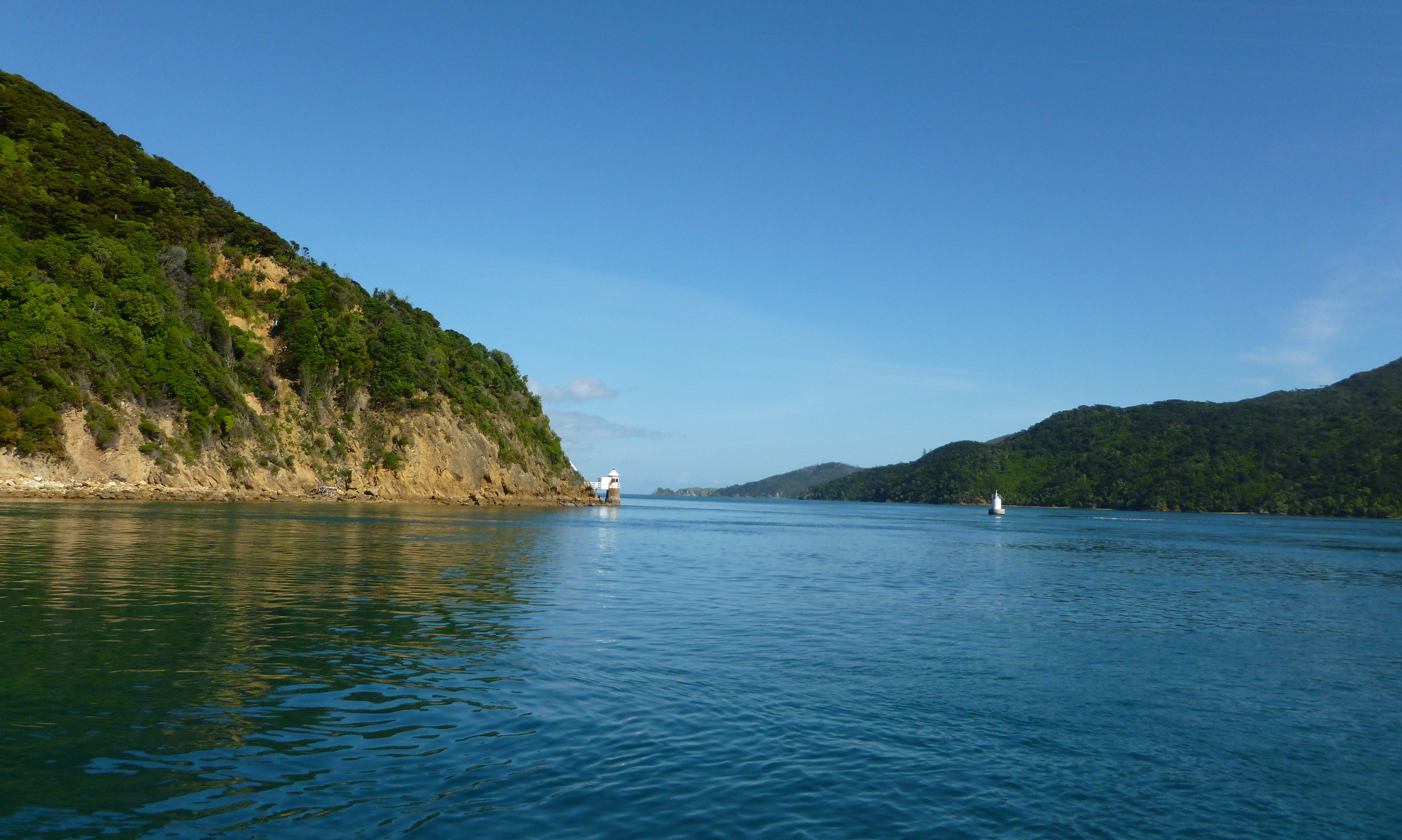
Approach to French Pass from north east

The pass is a gateway from Tasman Bay / Te Tai-o-Aorere to the Marlborough Sounds, and is a shortcut of about 15 nautical miles (28 km; 17 mi) that is comparatively more comfortable trip than the alternative routes around the top of Stephens Island or through the Stephens Passage between it and Rangitoto ki te Tonga / D'Urville Island, both wild windy waters.

The pass is 500 metres (1,600 ft) wide; however, the navigable channel narrows to 100 metres (330 ft), and is awash with whirlpools, eddies, overfalls, rips and counter-currents. With care, a vessel can navigate the pass within an hour either side of slack water.

A prudent mariner will time their passage through here to coincide with a change of tidal stream, when counter-currents and whirlpools lessen.

Warning 1: Tidal stream times are approximate only. Slack water, if it occurs at all, is brief

Warning 2: It is dangerous to attempt it under sail

Warning 3: It is very dangerous to try it against the stream, unless the boat can travel at at least 8 knots (15 km/h; 9.2 mph) under engine power

At night, the lighthouse on the mainland has a white and a red sector on both sides (identification F WR). If a boat is on the correct course, the white sector is visible, if you leave this sector, the red light becomes visible. The range of the red light is 10 nautical miles (19 km; 12 mi), and that of the white light 17 nautical miles (31 km; 20 mi). The red sector is obscured in Waikawa Bay by Two Island Point. The beacon on the reef emits a white glow every 1.5 seconds (identification F W), with a range of 4 nautical miles (7.4 km; 4.6 mi).

A note on nautical chart NZ6151 directs mariners to provide an “All ships, all ships” warning to other vessels on channel 16 VHF ten minutes prior to entering the pass, stating the direction of travel. The warning helps to prevent a boat meeting another one coming from the opposite direction, especially as it is not possible to see others approaching when travelling from the north east in time to avoid collision.

The approach from the south west is through an area called the Current Basin. A shallow area, called Middle Bank, is marked with a green buoy, and this should be kept to port heading towards the pass, and starboard heading away from it. The position and depth of Middle Bank is liable to change.

Fisherman or Coutre Pass at the northern end of the reef should only be attempted with local knowledge.

== French Pass Reef Beacon ==
French Pass Reef Light
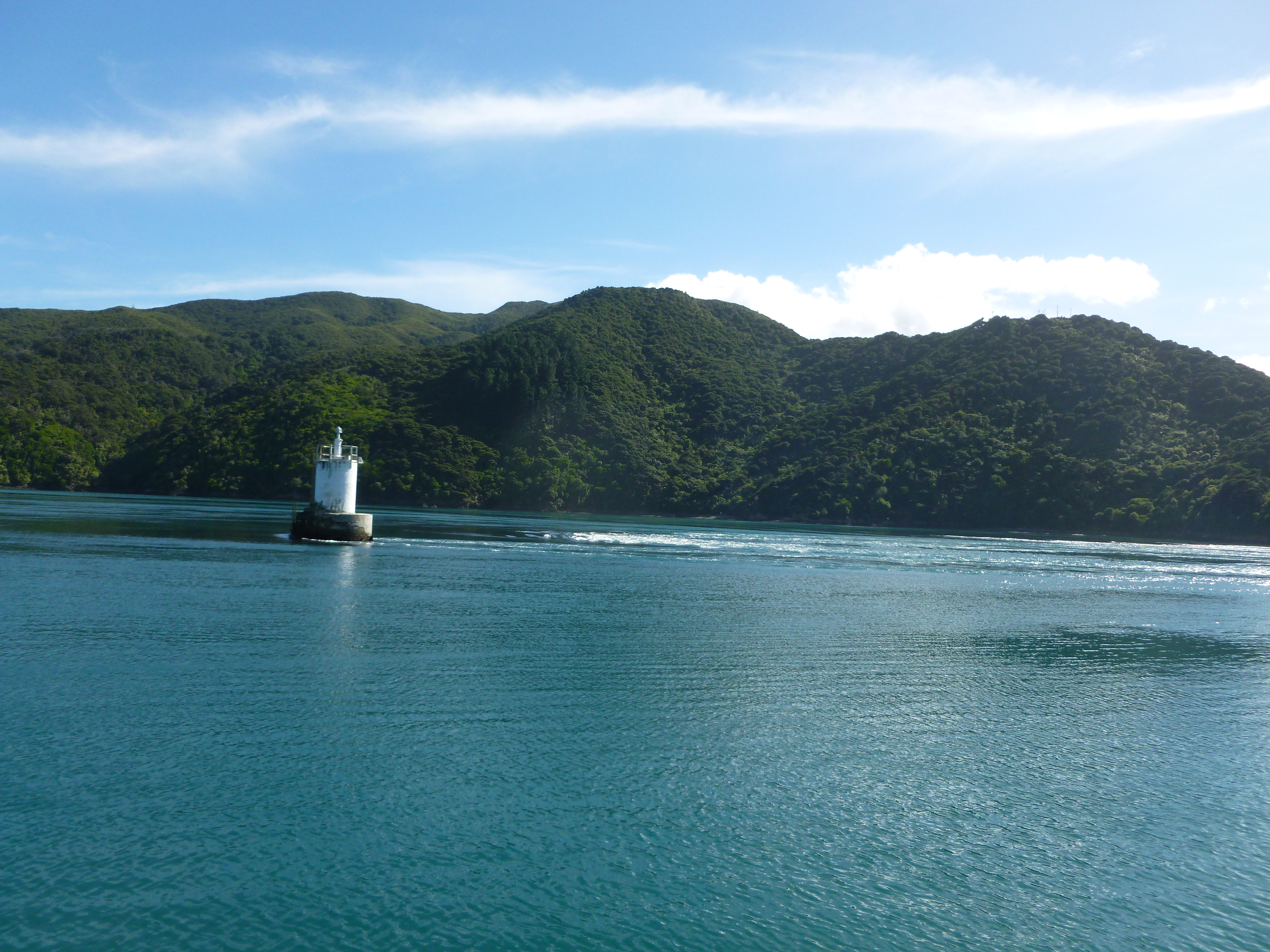
- Location: Marlborough District, New Zealand
- Coordinates: 40°55′23″S 173°50′01″E

Tower
- Constructed: 1882
- Height: 5 m (16 ft)

Light
- Focal height: 5 m (16 ft)
- Characteristic: Fl W 1.5s

The lighthouse's companion beacon located across the channel on the edge of the reef, at latitude -40.922931 longitude 173.833739. Its structure is cylindrical concrete turret, painted white. It stands at 5 metres (16 ft) high, and at night emits a white glow every 1.5 seconds, with a range of 4 nautical miles (7.4 km; 4.6 mi).

Its formal identifiers are ARLHS: NZL-069 - Admiralty: K4240 - NGA: 5032.

== History ==
From 1854 to 1880 the only navigational aid that sailors had going through the pass was an iron perch erected on the end of the reef. In 1881, that was replaced with a concrete beacon. By this time, passenger and mail steamers regularly took a shortcut through the pass, at night, when travelling between Nelson and Wellington.

Despite the known dangers, it was not until 1892 that a ship's lamp was attached to the beacon, only to be struck shortly afterwards by a steamer, causing considerable damage to both the beacon and the boat. It was not until two years after that, that a lighthouse was constructed on the mainland side of the pass, facing towards the repaired beacon. A house for the lighthouse keeper was built on the cliff above with a connecting 100-step stairway to give access to the light.

On 1 October 1884 the lighthouse and beacon were officially lit.

In 1961, the lighthouse was automated, meaning the single lighthouse keeper no longer had to risk his life re-lighting the beacon light in a gale or replenishing it with oil at “slack tide”. The keeper was withdrawn in 1967.

== Access ==
Neither the lighthouse and its staircase, nor its companion beacon is open to the public; although they can be seen from a boat and there is a good lookout over French Pass a short walk from nearby Elmslie Bay Wharf.

== Operations ==
Like all lighthouses in New Zealand, both lights are remotely controlled by Maritime New Zealand from a central control room in Wellington.
