= Admiralty Bay (New Zealand) =

Bay in New Zealand

Coordinates: 40°57′42.31″S 173°51′26.17″E

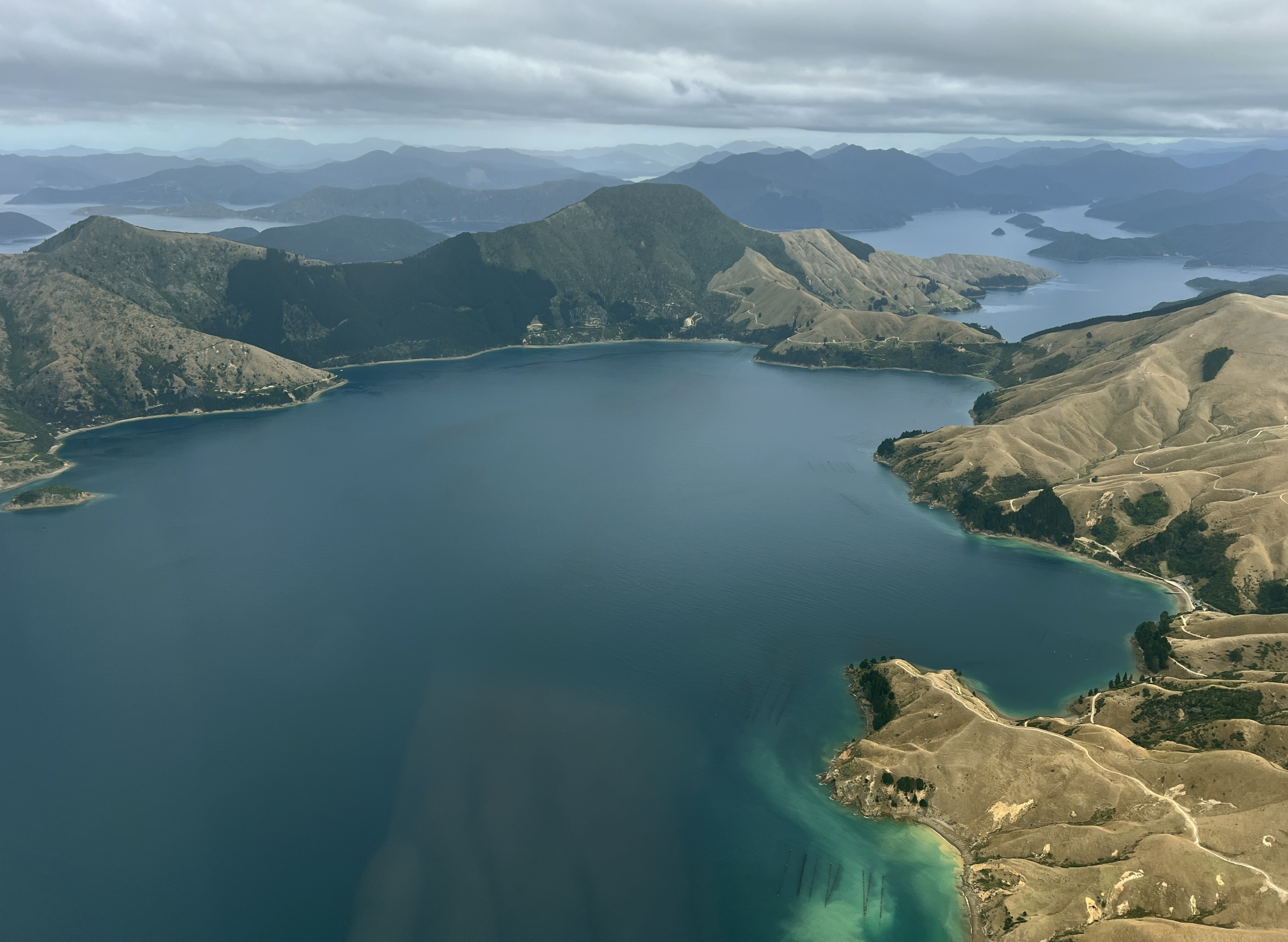
Admiralty Bay, Marlborough Sounds, New Zealand

Admiralty Bay is a large indentation in the northern coast of New Zealand's South Island. It lies close to the northernmost mainland point of the Marlborough Sounds, immediately to the south of D'Urville Island.

The bay, one of the larger of numerous bays in the crenellated coast of the sounds, is 10 kilometres (6 mi) wide at its mouth and extends 8 kilometres (5 mi) south. The peninsula into which it cuts is almost bisected by the bay, with a narrow isthmus only some 900 metres (3,000 ft) wide lying between the bay's southernmost extent and Hallam Cove to the south. To the northeast, the bay is open to the waters of Cook Strait, but to the west a narrow and treacherous stretch of water French Pass is the only maritime access.

The Bay was named in March 1770 by Lieutenant James Cook during his first voyage to the Pacific. Having completed a circumnavigation of New Zealand aboard HMS Endeavour, Cook had the ship anchored in the bay for resupply with wood and water, and remained there from 27 to 31 March 1770. Cook described the land surrounding the bay as "of a very hilly uneven surface and appears to be mostly covered with wood, shrubs, firns & c. which renders traveling both difficult and fatigueing." There was no evidence of present habitation, but Cook found several huts which seemed to have been long deserted. It was while Endeavour was anchored in Admiralty Bay that Cook decided to continue exploring westward rather than returning east to England; a consequence of this decision would be his discovery of Australia.

Admiralty Bay is now closely associated with Pelorus Jack, a dolphin which became widely known in New Zealand in the first few years of the 20th century. Pelorus Jack was noted for meeting and escorting ships through French Pass, and is possibly the first individual sea creature protected by law in any country.
