= Port Fitzroy =

Coordinates: 36.1648°S 175.3616°E

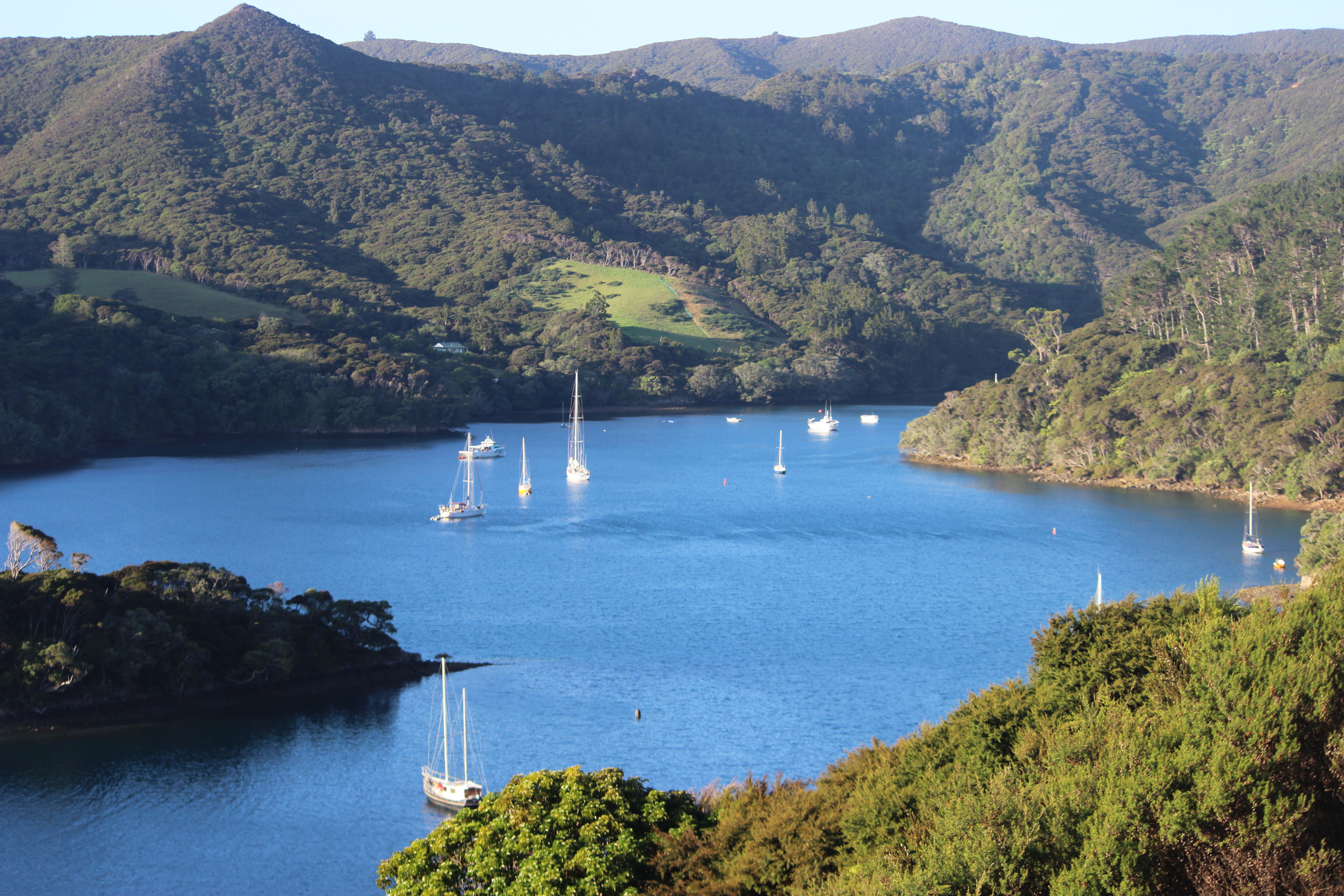
Port Fitzroy

Port Fitzroy is a harbour and coastal community on Great Barrier Island in New Zealand's Hauraki Gulf.

It is the largest natural harbour in the Gulf, with Kaikoura Island guarding the entrance to the harbour and providing shelter for yachties in almost all weather conditions.

Port Fitzroy is a stop for boats to pick up fuel, water and supplies. The harbour is particularly busy with Auckland boaties during the Christmas and summer period.

The settlement has only two basic service businesses, focused on servicing boaties. The Port FitzRoy Store is one of only four grocery stores on Great Barrier Island. Port FitzRoy Fuel sells both vehicle and boat fuel, but is one of the most expensive petrol stations in the country due to its remote location.

In 2019, Auckland Council introduced a waste drop-off service over summer to discourage boaties from dumping waste.

There are aquaculture farms in the sheltered waters and an annual Musselfest event.

The Warren's and Bridle Tracks, managed by the Department of Conservation, pass a waterfall, deep pools for swimming, and a mixture of native and exotic forest.

== Climate ==
Climate data for Port Fitzroy (1991–2020 normals, extremes 1961–2003)
Month	Jan	Feb	Mar	Apr	May	Jun	Jul	Aug	Sep	Oct	Nov	Dec	Year
Record high °C (°F)	28.7 (83.7)	29.9 (85.8)	27.5 (81.5)	25.9 (78.6)	22.8 (73.0)	22.5 (72.5)	19.5 (67.1)	20.2 (68.4)	21.5 (70.7)	23.4 (74.1)	24.3 (75.7)	27.1 (80.8)	29.9 (85.8)
Mean daily maximum °C (°F)	23.9 (75.0)	24.0 (75.2)	22.8 (73.0)	20.9 (69.6)	18.5 (65.3)	16.5 (61.7)	15.7 (60.3)	15.9 (60.6)	17.2 (63.0)	18.5 (65.3)	20.3 (68.5)	22.4 (72.3)	19.7 (67.5)
Daily mean °C (°F)	19.7 (67.5)	20.1 (68.2)	18.9 (66.0)	16.9 (62.4)	15.0 (59.0)	13.1 (55.6)	12.2 (54.0)	12.4 (54.3)	13.4 (56.1)	14.8 (58.6)	16.4 (61.5)	18.5 (65.3)	16.0 (60.7)
Mean daily minimum °C (°F)	15.4 (59.7)	16.2 (61.2)	15.0 (59.0)	13.0 (55.4)	11.4 (52.5)	9.7 (49.5)	8.8 (47.8)	8.9 (48.0)	9.7 (49.5)	11.1 (52.0)	12.5 (54.5)	14.6 (58.3)	12.2 (54.0)
Record low °C (°F)	7.0 (44.6)	6.2 (43.2)	5.6 (42.1)	4.5 (40.1)	1.7 (35.1)	0.2 (32.4)	0.4 (32.7)	1.3 (34.3)	2.3 (36.1)	1.9 (35.4)	3.3 (37.9)	7.3 (45.1)	0.2 (32.4)
Average rainfall mm (inches)	92.3 (3.63)	120.0 (4.72)	134.1 (5.28)	115.1 (4.53)	159.0 (6.26)	165.8 (6.53)	245.6 (9.67)	178.2 (7.02)	132.0 (5.20)	99.8 (3.93)	102.7 (4.04)	127.6 (5.02)	1,672.2 (65.83)
Source: NIWA
