= Maniniaro / Angelus Peak =

Mountain in New Zealand

- Maniniaro
- Maniniaro / Angelus Peak (centre left, obscured by cloud) as viewed from near Sunset Saddle

Highest point
- Elevation: 2,075 m (6,808 ft)
- Prominence: 200 m (660 ft)
- Parent peak: Unnamed
- Coordinates: 41.908°S 172.744°E

Naming
- Native name: Maniniaro (Māori)
- Defining authority: New Zealand Geographic Board

Geography
- Location within New Zealand
- Location: Nelson Lakes National Park
- Country: New Zealand
- Region: Tasman
- Parent range: Travers Range

Geology
- Formed by: Tectonic uplift

Maniniaro / Angelus Peak is a mountain in Nelson Lakes National Park, near the northwestern extent of New Zealand's main divide. Although it is not the tallest peak in the Angelus Ridge or the wider Travers Range, Maniniaro remains a popular tramping destination and is significant to the Ngāti Apa ki te Rā Tō iwi, who claim mana whenua (regional authority) within the area. According to Ngāti Apa ki te Rā Tō beliefs, the mountain is intrinsically linked with nearby Rotomaninitua / Lake Angelus, with the two both said to represent the footprints of the iwi's ancestors as they embarked on their journey back to Hawaiki. It is also near both major lakes of the national park, being roughly 6 kilometres (3.7 mi) from the southern ends of both Lakes Rotoiti and Rotoroa.

Being situated near the intersection of several walking tracks, Maniniaro / Angelus Peak is a popular destination for trampers. The popular Angelus Hut is situated on the shore of nearby Rotomaninitua / Lake Angelus, which provides a launching point for those wishing to climb the summit of Maniniaro as the route from the hut to the summit requires no specialist equipment when there is no snow. Routes to near the summit are among the most important in Nelson Lakes National Park, and are an active part of the park's management plan. The Department of Conservation also noted the potential for ski touring in the alpine areas around the peak, recommending that this be managed through concessions to prevent overcrowding of facilities.

Maniniaro / Angelus Peak is one of many places in New Zealand to have a dual place name, consisting of the Māori name and the European name. The mountain's Māori name highlights the connection which it is to nearby Rotomaninitua in the beliefs of the local Ngāti Apa ki te Rā Tō iwi, who see both as markers and resting places for their ancestors on their return journey to their ancestral homeland of Hawaiki. The mountain was subsequently named as Angelus Peak by the climbers L.J. Dumbleton and D.J. Stanton, who ascended the mountain on an evening during Easter 1947. The latter of these was the official name until 2014, when a Treaty of Waitangi settlement with multiple iwi from the upper South Island included a provision to alter the official name to a dual form. This was done in part to recognise the significance of the peak to local Māori.
