= Mount MacKenzie / Pakihiwitahi =

Mountain in New Zealand

- Location within New Zealand

Highest point
- Elevation: 527 m (1,729 ft)
- Prominence: 167 m (548 ft)
- Coordinates: 45.530°S 170.571°E

Naming
- Etymology: Named for a chief of the waka Āraiteuru, who is said to have been turned into a hill for not properly seeking the favour of the gods prior to a hunt. Also named for Thomas MacKenzie, a Prime Minister of New Zealand from the region.
- Native name: Pakihiwitahi (Māori)
- Defining authority: New Zealand Geographic Board

Geography
- Country: New Zealand
- Region: Otago

Geology
- Formed by: Volcanism
- Mountain type(s): Phreatomagmatic breccia, Tuff
- Volcanic zone: Dunedin Volcanic Group

Mount MacKenzie / Pakihiwitahi is a hill in eastern Otago, New Zealand, roughly 11 kilometres (6.8 mi) northwest of the township of Waikouaiti. The hill is volcanic in origin, being associated with the Dunedin Volcanic Group, an intraplate volcanic field which was active during the Miocene. The volcanic material is believed to have resulted in the hill being a magnetic anomaly, with the terrain on the hill having a significantly lower magnetic response than the surrounding terrain.

Pakihiwitahi is significant to members of the Ngāi Tahu iwi in the area, who associate it in legend with nearby Matakaea. According to this belief, ancestors of Ngāi Tahu arrived in the area aboard the waka Āraiteuru, which capsized off the coast near Moeraki. The remnants of this event are seen throughout the area, with the water gourds and kūmara becoming the Moeraki Boulders / Kaihinaki and the waka itself washing ashore at Matakaea. The inhabitants of this waka, including Pakihiwitahi and Aoraki, came ashore to explore their surroundings, but turned to stone due to the harsh environment. In some legends, this was instead due to failing to pay proper respects to the gods before venturing inland.

Recognising the significance of this hill as an ancestral figure, in 1998 it became one of nearly 100 places to be given an official dual place name through the Ngāi Tahu Claims Settlement Act 1998, a landmark Treaty of Waitangi settlement between Ngāi Tahu and the New Zealand government.
