= New River / Kaimata =

River in New Zealand

Coordinates: 42°32′44.23″S 171°8′47.32″E

The New River / Kaimata is a river in the West Coast region of the South Island of New Zealand. It rises in the hills to the west of Lake Brunner and flows down the north edge of the floodplain of the Taramakau River then turns north for about 2 kilometres (1.2 mi) behind coastal dunes before meeting the Tasman Sea. There was much gold dredging activity around the river.

The river's name was formally changed to the dual name New River / Kaimata in 1998 as part of the Ngāi Tahu claims settlement.
