= Arrow Rock (New Zealand) =

Island off the coast of New Zealand

Coordinates: 41.2682°S 173.2401°E

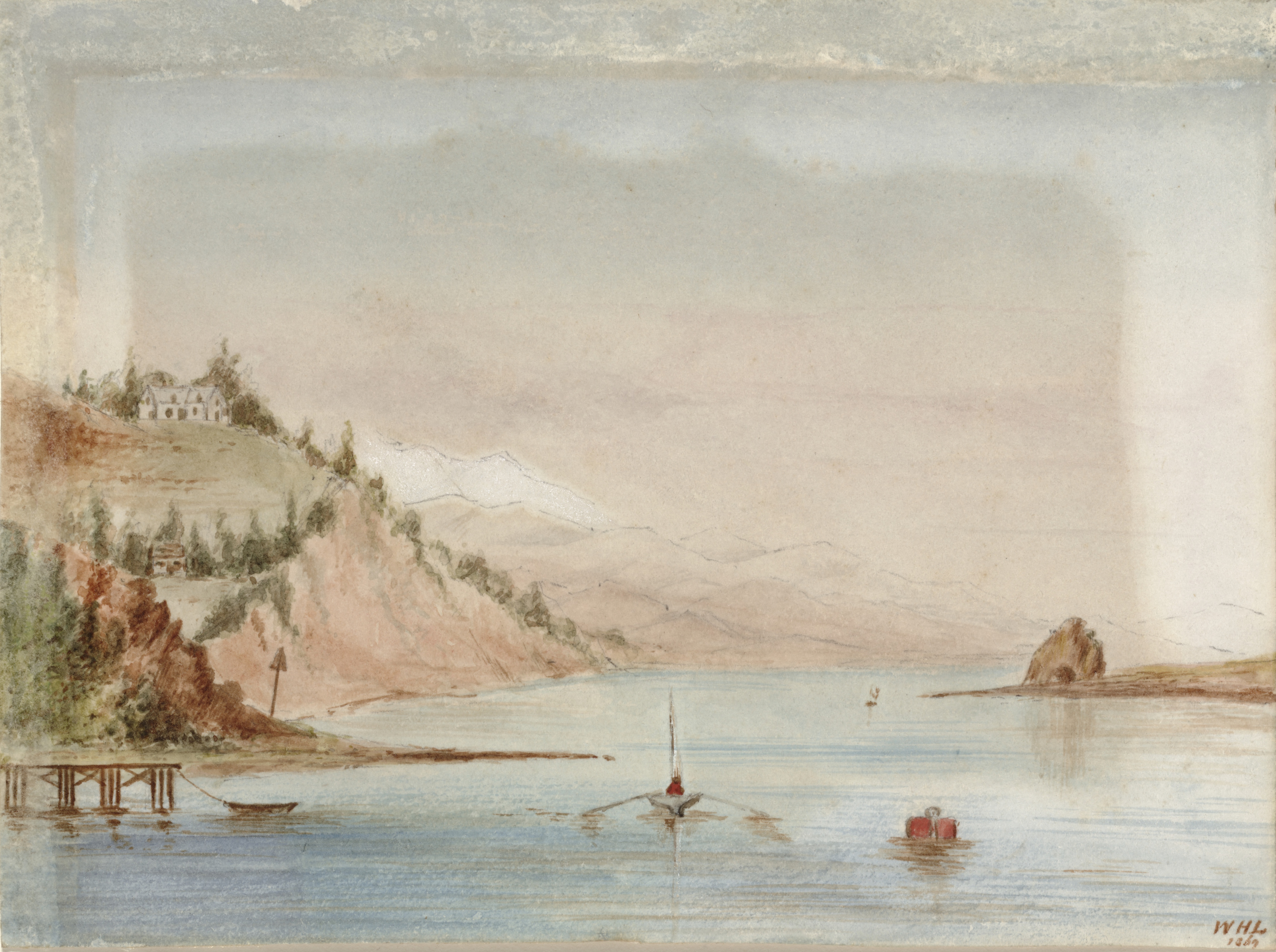
Waterpainting of Port Nelson, with the small Arrow Rock on the far right.

Arrow Rock (also Fifeshire Rock or Urenui in te reo Māori) is a small island in Tasman Bay / Te Tai-o-Aorere, off the coast of Nelson, New Zealand. There is a narrow channel between the rock and Haulashore Island. Situated within Nelson Harbour, Arrow Rock was site of the Fifeshire wreck in 1842, which gave the rock its secondary name. There are a number of spotted shags who live on the rock.

The rock is named after the first ship to sail into Nelson harbour, the Arrow. She was a 212-ton brig chartered by the New Zealand Company and used as store ship on the companies expedition to set up a settlement in Tasman Bay. She sailed into Nelson harbour on 2 November 1841 and was followed the next day by the surveyors barques Whitby and Will Watch.

== Fifeshire wreck ==
The barque Fifeshire totally wrecked on Arrow Rock on Sunday, February 27, 1842. It had brought out for a party of settlers for Nelson. After discharging her cargo, she got under way with a pilot on board. When she reached the narrows opposite Arrow Rock, the wind suddenly died away, and the tide drifted her upon the rocks. Other ships to be wrecked after hitting the rock include the schooner Three Sisters on 15 September 1866.
