= Kaikōura Island =

Island in New Zealand

Kaikoura Island
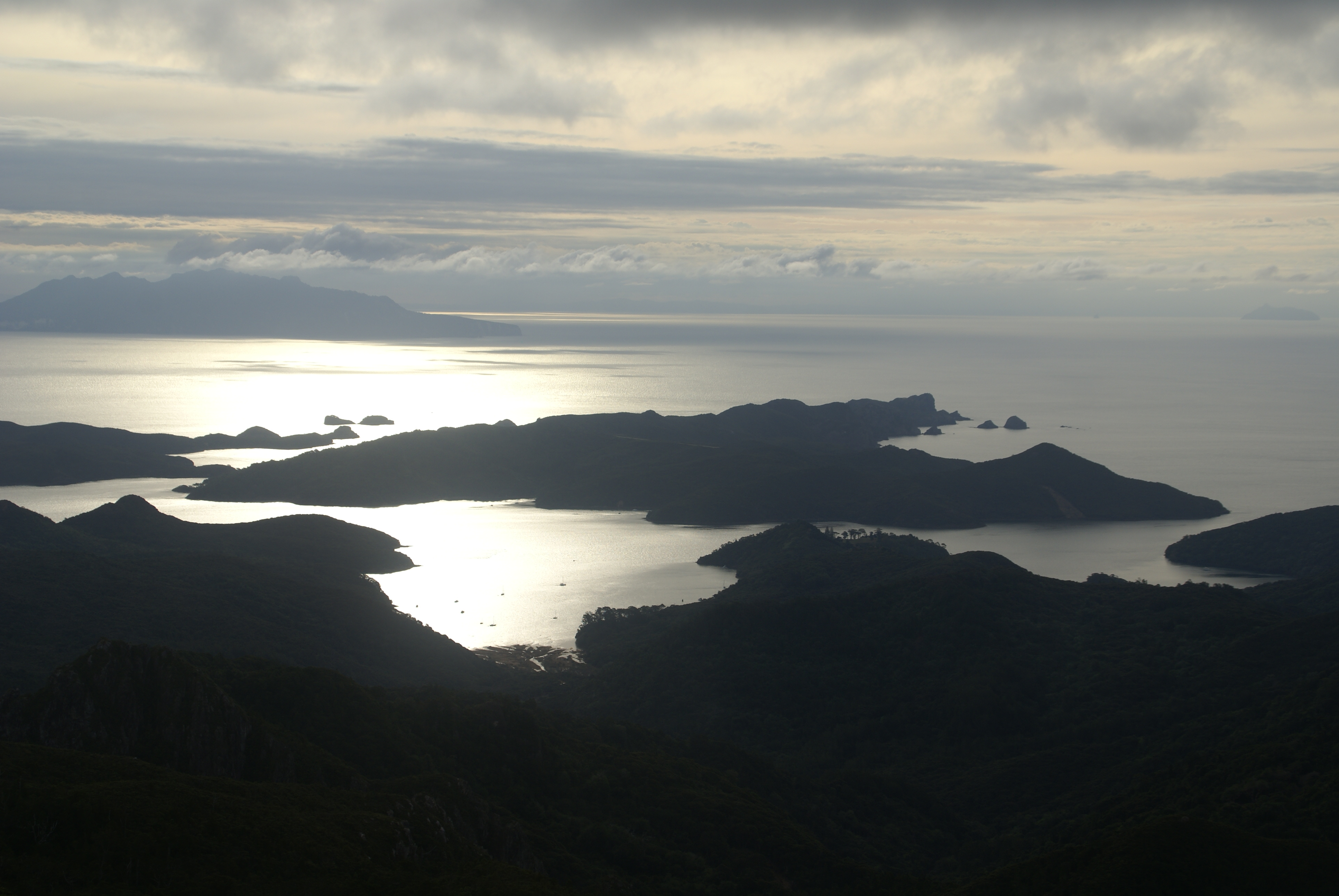
- Interactive map of Kaikoura Island

Geography
- Location: Auckland Region
- Coordinates: 36.1771°S 175.3266°E
- Area: 5.64 km^{2} (2.18 sq mi)
- Highest elevation: 185 m (607 ft)
- Highest point: Mitre Peak

Administration
- New Zealand

Kaikoura Island (also known as Selwyn Island) lies in an irregularly-shaped bay on the western side of Great Barrier Island in the Hauraki Gulf in New Zealand, 90 km (56 mi) north east of Auckland. Kaikoura Island is the seventh largest island in the Hauraki Gulf. It is 80 metres from Great Barrier Island at its closest point and forms the natural harbours of Port FitzRoy and Port Abercrombie. Its biota includes the endangered brown teal duck, the North Island Kākā and many native trees and shrubs.

== History ==
In the early 1900s, the island was privately owned by Ted Darnton.

In 2004 it was purchased from private ownership by the government's Nature Heritage Fund, other government agencies and private trusts to become a public reserve. The Motu Kaikoura Trust was set up to restore, control and manage the island.

== See also ==
- List of islands of New Zealand
