= Motuopae Island / Peach Island =

Island in Tauranga, New Zealand

Geography
- Location: Tauranga, New Zealand
- Coordinates: 37.6849°S 176.1522°E

Motuopae Island / Peach Island is located in Waikareao Estuary in Tauranga, New Zealand. In 1886 Motuopae Island / Peach Island was gazetted as a native reserve for the iwi Ngāi Tamarawaho. The island is sometimes referred to as Peach Island because of peaches growing on it. The island is a urupā, a Māori burial site, and was described in 2020 as almost being full. It was previously a pā site.
