= Motukawao Islands =

Island group in New Zealand

Māori: Motukawao
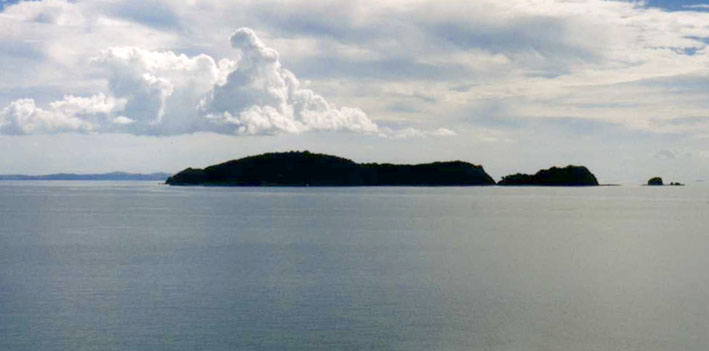
- Motukawao Islands and Hauraki Gulf from Amodeo Bay, near Colville.
- Interactive map of Motukawao Islands

Geography
- Location: Waikato region
- Coordinates: 36.690°S 175.400°E

Administration
- New Zealand

Demographics
- Population: 0

The Motukawao Islands are the northernmost of several small groups of islands that lie in the Hauraki Gulf off the west coast of the Coromandel Peninsula, New Zealand. They lie some 5 kilometres (3.1 mi) to the southwest of Colville, and are uninhabited. The largest of the islands are Motuwi and Ngamotukaraka Islands; others include Moturua and Motukaramarama Islands.

In 1970 the Māori Land Court vested these islands into the Ngamotuaroha Trust on behalf of its owners. The current trustees have recently completed a Jobs for Nature environmental cleanup program on the islands.

Motukaramarama Island lies some 3.5 kilometres (2.2 mi) off the coast and is uninhabited. It has been identified as an Important Bird Area by BirdLife International because it is a nesting site for about 3500 pairs of Australasian gannets.

== See also ==
- List of islands of New Zealand
- List of islands
- Desert island
