= French Pass =

Narrow and treacherous stretch of water on the west of New Zealand

Coordinates: 40°55′19″S 173°50′1″E

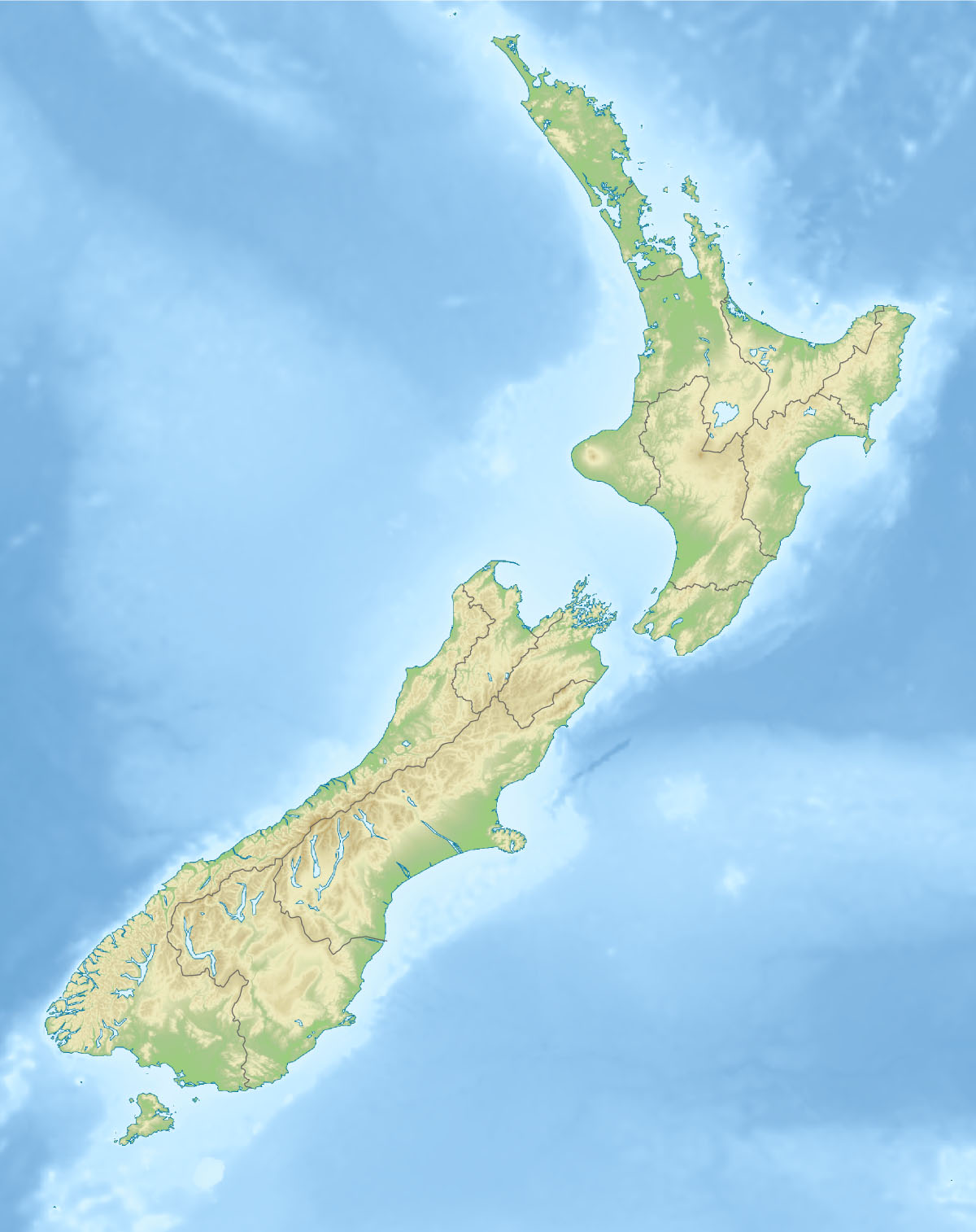
French Pass has the fastest tidal flows in New Zealand

French Pass (Māori: Te Aumiti; officially gazetted Te Aumiti / French Pass) is a narrow and treacherous stretch of water that separates D'Urville Island, at the north end of the South Island of New Zealand, from the mainland coast. At one end is Tasman Bay, and at the other end the outer Pelorus Sound / Te Hoiere leads out to Cook Strait.

French Pass has the fastest tidal flows in New Zealand, reaching 8 knots (4 m/s). When the tide changes, the current can be strong enough to stun fish.

The local tribes are Ngāti Koata and Ngāti Kuia.

== History ==
In the oral tradition of some Māori tribes, Te Aumiti (French Pass) is the resting place of Kupe's pet king shag, called Te Kawau-a-Toru. Kupe was a pioneer Polynesian navigator who discovered Cook Strait in his canoe. While he was exploring Cook Strait, Kupe was attacked by a giant octopus. In the furious battle to kill the octopus, the coast was gouged into the convoluted shapes that today make up the Sounds. Kupe's loyal shag then led Kupe to the French Pass passage, and explored the area on Kupe's behalf. Te Kawau-a-Toru had a huge wingspan, and was reputed to be a sacred bird with "the eye of the ancestor", insight into ancient knowledge. However, while testing the channel to see if it was safe for Kupe's canoe, Te Kawau-a-Toru got caught in the tidal rip, broke a wing and drowned. The broken reef adjacent to the channel is Kupe's loyal bird turned to stone – Te Aumiti a te Kawau-a-Toru (the currents that swallowed Toru's shag). A nearby rocky point where a lighthouse now stands is the bird's petrified bones.

The first recorded European navigation of the pass occurred in 1827. Admiral Jules Dumont d'Urville navigated the pass during his second voyage to New Zealand, in the French Navy corvette Astrolabe. Approaching the narrowest part of the pass, the vessel swung sideward and did not respond to steerage. The corvette struck rocks twice, and was then washed over the reef and into Admiralty Bay. The high energy and complexity of the location was summed up by d'Urville suggesting that no one should attempt to navigate French Pass except in extreme emergency.

In 1888, a Risso's dolphin appeared in the area. For the next 24 years, this dolphin accompanied boats to and from French Pass. He became famous as Pelorus Jack and was the first dolphin in the world to receive the protection of the law. Pelorus Jack stayed in the Pelorus Sounds, and did not navigate the pass into Tasman Bay. He would meet boats as they came out of the pass, riding their bow waves for 8 kilometres (5.0 mi) to Pelorus Sound. Then he would join boats returning to Nelson at the entrance to Pelorus Sound / Te Hoiere and escort them back to the pass. Pelorus Jack was last seen in April 1912. The lightkeeper at French Pass claimed he found the body of Pelorus Jack decomposing on the shore.

In August 2014, the name of French Pass was officially altered to Te Aumiti / French Pass.

== Tidal flows ==
External images
- Painting of a King shag
- Painting of the Astrolabe in French Pass
- Photo of the French Pass in full flow
- Google image

The pass is 500 metres (1,600 ft) across, but the main navigation channel (the "throat" or "narrows") contracts down to only 100 metres (330 ft) with a 20-metre (66 ft) deep shoaling region. Most of the rest of the pass is broken reef.

On one side is Cook Strait with a tidal range up to 2 metres (6.6 ft), and on the other side is Tasman Bay with a tidal range up to 4 metres (13 ft). This can result in substantial pressure gradients across the pass, complicated by a phase or time difference of about 25 minutes between the high tides on either side. Peak flow in the throat of the pass is around 4 metres per second (13 ft/s).

Near to the pass are deep holes where strong vertical flows can occur. In 2000, student divers taking part in a drift dive during the local ebb flow were separated from their surface float and caught in a whirlpool. This dragged them into "Jacob's Hole", a 68-metre (223 ft) deep depression south west of the pass. The depth of this descent resulted in multiple fatalities. The group appears to have been drawn deep into the hole and then returned to the surface again. A dive computer record of one of the survivors show a depth of up to 89-metre (292 ft). According to the coroner's report, the accident occurred on a falling tide, so the current was flowing from the south west to the north east.

== French Pass / Anaru ==
French Pass / Anaru is an unofficial name for the settlement south of French Pass, which has been in use since at least 1980. It was formerly Anaru. There is a short walk to a lookout overlooking the channel and a campground, with a boat ramp and jetty. The road to French Pass / Anaru is about 70 km (43 mi) from SH6, much of it unsealed and with sharp bends.

Demographics for the area are covered at Elaine Bay#Demographics.

There was an Elmslie Bay school in French Pass from 1894 to 1900. French Pass School opened from 1910 to 2012.

A school operated in Deep Bay, Admiralty Cove intermittently between 1885 and 1967 and another at Waikawa Bay from 1921 to 1940.
