= Lake Karoro / Mathews =

Lake in Northland Region, New Zealand

- Location within Northland Region
- Location: Northland Region, North Island
- Coordinates: 36.3846°S 174.0754°E
- Basin countries: New Zealand

Lake Karoro / Mathews is a lake in the Northland Region of New Zealand.

== See also ==
- List of lakes in New Zealand
