= Broken Islands / Pig Islands =

Group of islands in New Zealand

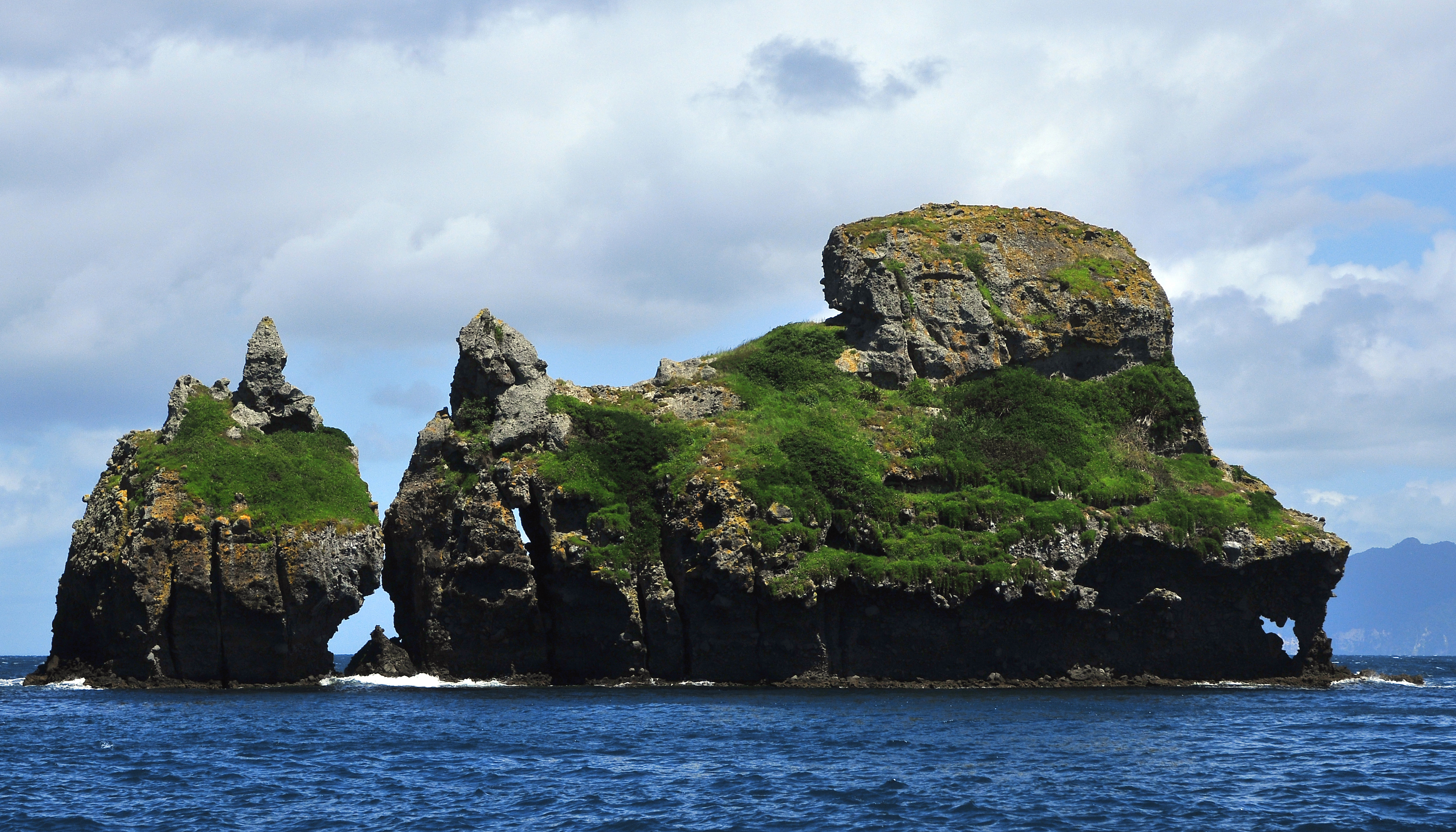

Geography
- Coordinates: 36.218167°S 175.29525°E

Administration
- New Zealand
- Region: Auckland

Demographics
- Population: uninhabited

The Broken Islands / Pig Islands is a group of islands in the west of Great Barrier Island in the Hauraki Gulf of New Zealand. The islands include Motutaiko, Rangiahua, and Mahuki Island / Anvil Island.

== See also ==
- List of islands of New Zealand
