= Harris Saddle =

Mountain pass in Otago on the South Island of New Zealand

- Harris Saddle / Tarahaka Whakatipu
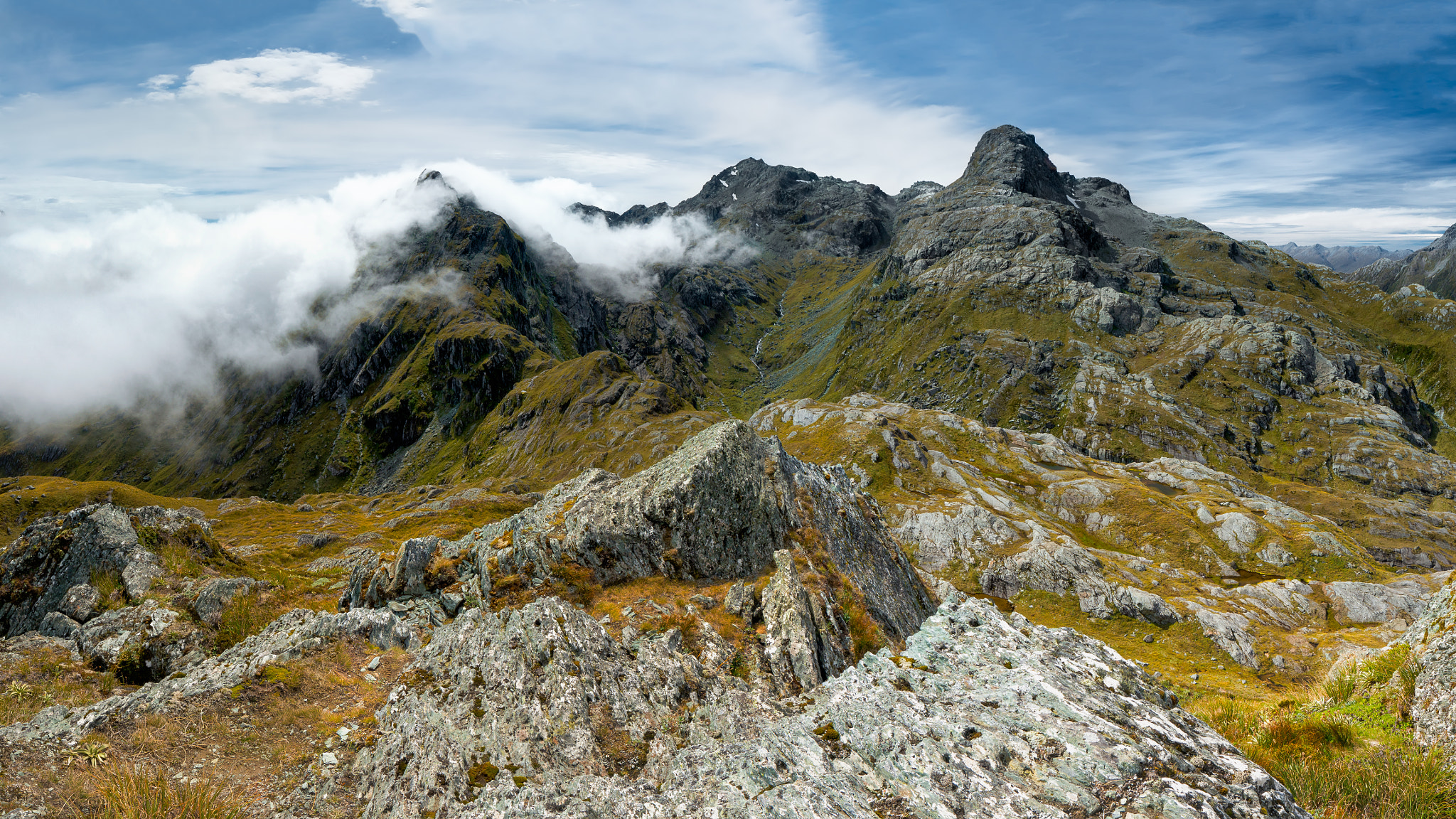
- Harris Saddle and Conical Hill, seen from along the Routeburn Track
- Interactive map of Harris Saddle
- Elevation: 1,255 m (4,117 ft)

Third Approach
- Coordinates: 44.727°S 168.172°E

Harris Saddle (Māori: Tarahaka Whakatipu), also known as Harris Pass and officially known as Harris Saddle / Tarahaka Whakatipu, is a mountain pass in Otago, on the South Island of New Zealand. It is located near Lake Harris and Conical Hill, and is part of the Routeburn Track.

In the early 1880s, William Walter Smith stated that he view from the pass was "magnificent" and he recommended it to be preserved as a scenic route.
