= Mount Watkin / Hikaroroa =

Mountain in Otago, New Zealand

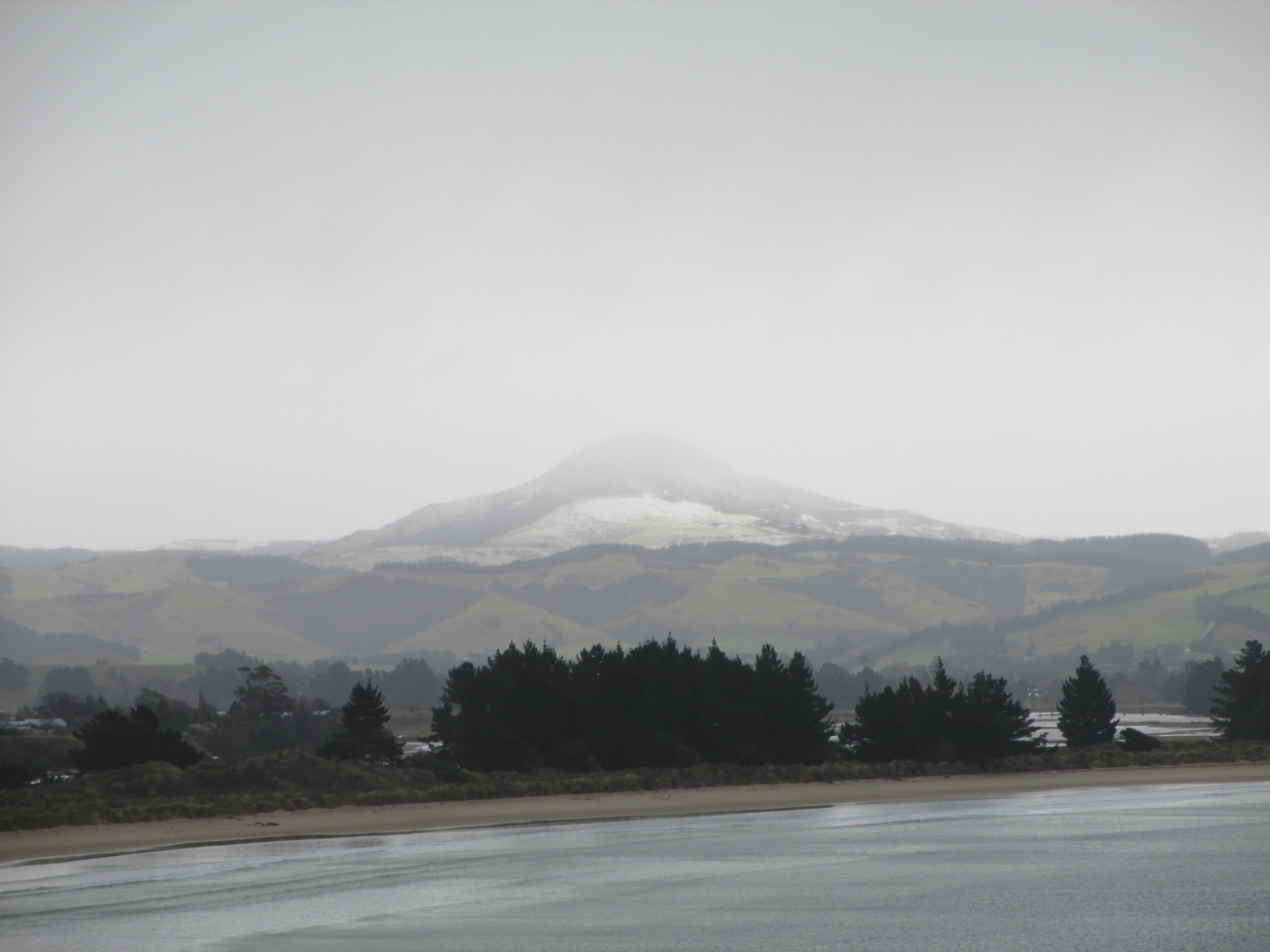
- Fog shrouding the snow covered Mount Watkin / Hikaroroa

Highest point
- Elevation: 616 m (2,021 ft)
- Coordinates: 45°34′S 170°35′E

Naming
- Etymology: Hikaroroa, after a Kāti-Māmoe warrior Watkin, after Reverend James Watkin
- Native name: Hiikaroroa (Māori)

Geography
- Country: New Zealand
- Region: Otago
- District: Dunedin

Geology
- Mountain type: Stratovolcano

Mount Watkin / Hikaroroa is a 616-metre peak located north-west of Waikouaiti, Otago, New Zealand. It is on the east side of the North Branch of the Waikouaiti River.

The peak was originally named Hikaroroa, after a Kāti-Māmoe warrior, and was renamed after a pioneer Methodist missionary, Reverend James Watkin in the 1840s. The name was changed to "Mount Watkin / Hikaroroa" by the Ngāi Tahu Claims Settlement Act 1998 No 97.
