= Ōhinetamatea River =

River in New Zealand

Coordinates: 43°27′S 169°46′E

Ōhinetamatea River / Saltwater Creek
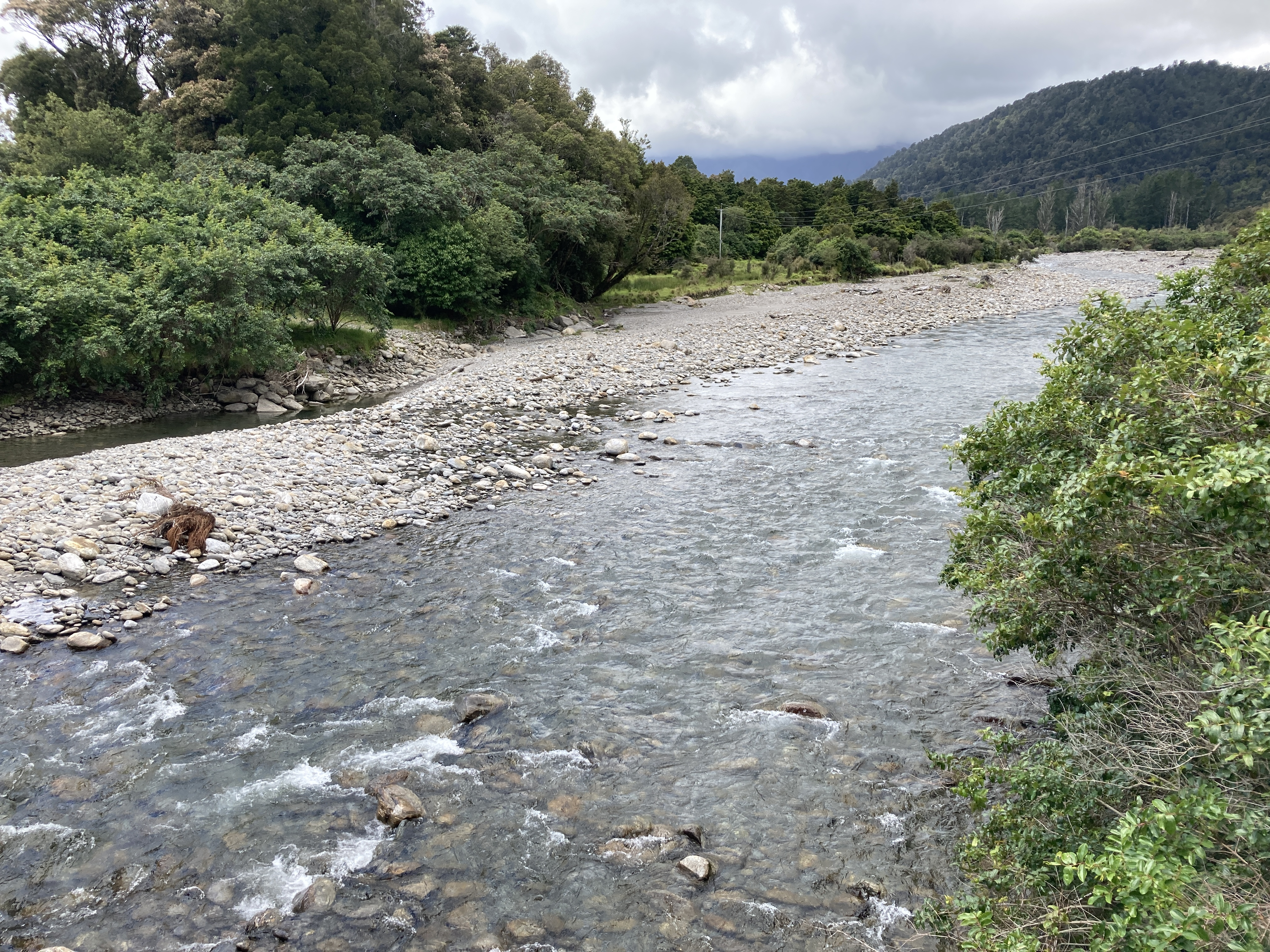

Location
- Country: New Zealand

Physical characteristics
- Source
  - elevation: 1,700 metres (5,600 ft)
- Mouth
  - location: Tasman Sea
  - elevation: 0 metres (0 ft)

Ōhinetamatea River / Saltwater Creek is a river in the Westland District of New Zealand.

The river rises on the north flank of the Copland Range and flows generally northward until it reaches the valley of the Cook River and turns westward. There is a 72 metres (236 ft) high waterfall at 700 metres (2,300 ft) elevation. The river passes to the south of an ancient glacial moraine which separates its lower reaches from the Cook River valley.

== See also ==
- List of rivers of New Zealand
