= Challenger Island / Little Kawau Island =

Island in New Zealand

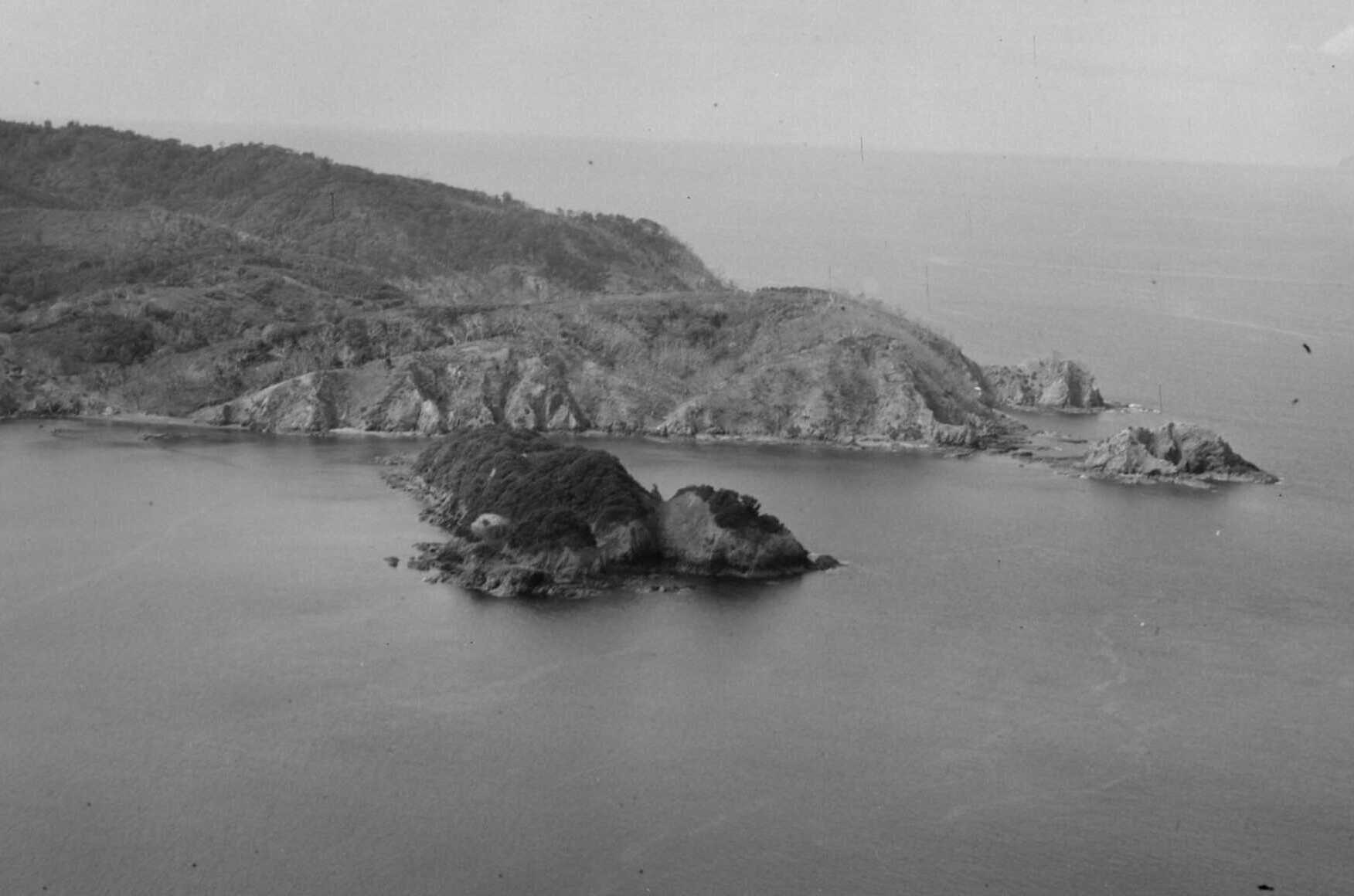
- Aerial view of Challenger Island / Little Kawau Island and Kawau Island in the background in 1955
- Interactive map of Challenger Island / Little Kawau Island

Geography
- Location: Auckland
- Coordinates: 36.453278°S 174.872833°E
- Adjacent to: Hauraki Gulf
- Length: 300 m (1000 ft)
- Width: 90 m (300 ft)
- Highest elevation: 30 m (100 ft)

Administration
- New Zealand
- Region: Auckland

Challenger Island / Little Kawau Island is an island in the Hauraki Gulf of New Zealand. It sits south of Kawau Island.

== Geography ==
The island is located 200 m (660 ft) off the southern coast of Kawau Island, separated by a very narrow channel at low tide. The island is composed of eroded Jurassic-Triassic age greywacke, unlike many of the Waitemata Group islands in the surrounding area.

== Biodiversity ==
The island is forested with kohekohe, māhoe, tawapou and pōhutukawa trees. The success of coastal plant species on the island relative to neighbouring Kawau Island has been explained by the absence of wallabies and possums. While the channel is a barrier to marsupial species crossing, this is not a barrier for rodents, which are present on the island.

Challenger Island / Little Kawau Island is a known breeding site for the grey-faced petrel.

== History ==
Tāmaki Māori archaeological sites are found on the island, including terraces, middens and hāngī pits.

== See also ==
- List of islands of New Zealand
