= D'Urville Island =

Landmass off South Island in the South Pacific

Rangitoto ki te Tonga / D'Urville Island
Native name: Rangitoto ki te Tonga (Māori)
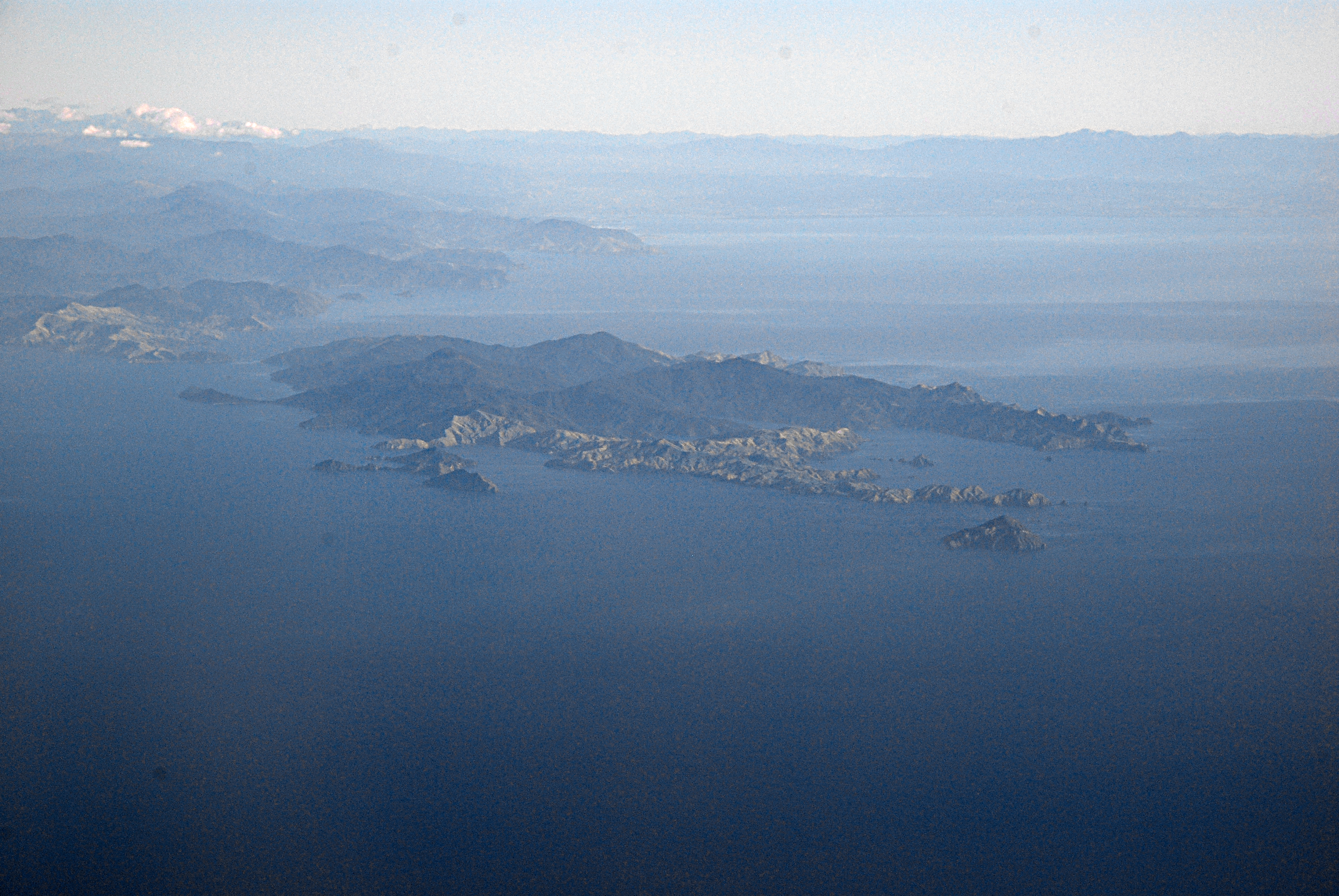
- D'Urville Island and Tasman Bay

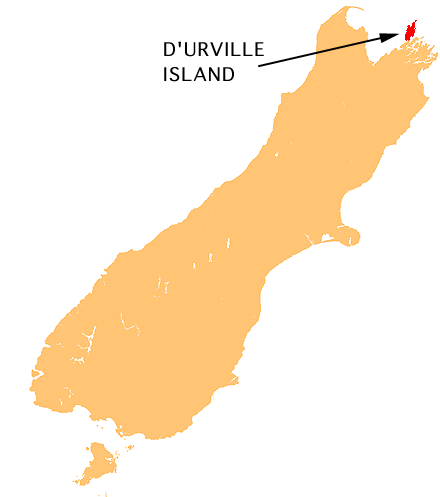
- Location of D'Urville Island

Geography
- Coordinates: 40°50′S 173°52′E
- Area: 150 km^{2} (58 sq mi)
- Highest elevation: 729 m (2392 ft)
- Highest point: Attempt Hill

Administration
- New Zealand
- Region: Marlborough District

Demographics
- Population: 52

D'Urville Island (/dɜːrˈvɪl/), Māori name Rangitoto ki te Tonga, is the largest island in the Marlborough Sounds, on the northern coast of the South Island of New Zealand. It was named after the French explorer Jules Dumont d'Urville. With an area of approximately 150 square kilometres (58 sq mi), it is the eighth-largest island of New Zealand, and has around 52 permanent residents. The local authority is the Marlborough District Council.

== History ==
The original Māori name of the island is Rangitoto, meaning "blood red sky" (rangi means sky; toto means blood). It is an ancient name brought from Hawaiki, the ancestral homeland of the Māori in the Pacific. The name was later lengthened to Rangitoto ki te Tonga, the suffix meaning "of the south", to distinguish it from places in the North Island called Rangitoto. The official name of the island is Rangitoto ki te Tonga / D'Urville Island.

The island was a traditional source of argillite (pakohe) for Māori, used in the production of stone tools such as adzes during the Archaic period (1300–1500). From the 1600s until the early 1800s, the island was a part of the rohe of Ngāti Tūmatakōkiri. In the present day, the island is within the rohe of Ngāti Koata and Ngāti Kuia.

== Geography ==
The island has a convoluted coastline, as is frequently found with islands formed from peaks between sea-drowned valleys. It extends for some 35 kilometres (22 miles) northeast/southwest, and is a little over 10 kilometres (6.2 miles) wide at its widest point. The eastern coast of the island is relatively smooth, marked mainly by the small D'Urville Peninsula, some halfway along its length. In contrast, the west coast is marked by three large inlets: Port Hardy in the north, Greville Harbour in the centre, and Manuhakapakapa in the south. Numerous smaller islands lie off the coast, notably Stephens Island, which lies 3 kilometres (1.9 miles) off D'Urville's northernmost point, Cape Stephens. The island's highest point, Takapōtaka / Attempt Hill (729 metres or 2,392 feet) lies close to the centre of the island, due east of Greville Harbour. Most of the island's residents live close to the more sheltered east coast, with the localities of Patuki and Mukahanga being close to the northern tip of the island.

The island is separated from the mainland by the dangerous French Pass, known to Māori as Te Aumiti, through which water passes at up to 8 knots (15 km/h; 9 mph) at each tide. Several vortices occur near this passage. d'Urville investigated the passage for several days in 1827, and damaged his ship passing through it.

== Flora and fauna ==
There is roughly 6,000ha (60km2) of public conservation land on D'urville Island, mainly through the centre of the island. The conservation land consists of regenerating farmland, coastal broadleaf, and beech forest.

D'Urville Island is free of possums, feral goats, ship rats, Norway rats, and weasels making it important ecologically. Red deer and feral pigs are present on the Island and a permit can be obtained from the New Zealand Department of Conservation to hunt on the public conservation land.

Stoats on the island have caused the local extinction of the little spotted kiwi, South Island kākā and yellow-crowned kākāriki. D'Urville Island Stoat Eradication Charitable Trust started in 2003 to attempt remove stoats from the island. A large scale stoat eradication programme was funded for the Island but after issues with land access the funding was withdrawn.

There is a population of the rare South Island long-tailed bat on the island.

== Transport ==
There is a small airstrip at Moawhitu, Greville Harbour, that is maintained by the Department of Conservation. Pelorus Air has flights to D'Urville Island from Picton, Wellington and Paraparaumu.

A barge service is operated by D'Urville Island Crossings between French Pass village and the settlement of Kapowai. There is also a water taxi operating between the D’Urville Island Wilderness Resort at Catherine Cove and French Pass.

In 2016, Motueka-based Abel Tasman Sea Shuttles hosted a number of charity cruises around D'Urville Island in conjunction with the Rotary Club of Motueka.

== See also ==
- Islands of New Zealand
- List of places named after people
