= Shades of blue =

Variety of the color blue

Blue
- Wavelength: 440–490 nm

Common connotations
- cold, sadness, confidence, harmony, water, winter, police

Color coordinates
- Hex triplet: #0000FF
- sRGB^{B} (r, g, b): (0, 0, 255)
- HSV (h, s, v): (240°, 100%, 100%)
- CIELCh_{uv} (L, C, h): (32, 131, 266°)
- Source: X11
- B: Normalized to [0–255] (byte)

Varieties of the color blue may differ in hue, chroma (also called saturation, intensity, or colorfulness), or lightness (or value, tone, or brightness), or in two or three of these qualities. Variations in value are also called tints and shades, a tint being a blue or other hue mixed with white, a shade being mixed with black. A large selection of these colors is shown below.

== Definitions of blue ==
=== Blue (RGB) (X11 blue) ===
Blue (Computer web color)
- Red, green, and blue lights, representing the three basic additive primary colours of the RGB colour system, red, green, and blue

Color coordinates
- Hex triplet: #0000FF
- sRGB^{B} (r, g, b): (0, 0, 255)
- HSV (h, s, v): (240°, 100%, 100%)
- CIELCh_{uv} (L, C, h): (32, 131, 266°)
- Source: X11 color names HTML/CSS
- ISCC–NBS descriptor: Vivid blue
- B: Normalized to [0–255] (byte)

The colour defined as blue in the RGB color model, X11 blue, is the most chromatic (colourful) blue that can be reproduced on a computer screen, and is the colour named blue in X11. It is one of the three primary colors used in the RGB colour space, along with red and green. The three additive primaries in the RGB colour system are the three colours of light chosen such as to provide the maximum gamut of colours that are capable of being represented on a computer or television set.

This colour is also called color wheel blue. It is at 240 degrees on the HSV/HSL colour wheel, also known as the RGB colour wheel. It is a spectral colour which lies at, or near, the short-wavelength end of the traditional "blue" and possibly was classified as "indigo" by Newton. Its complementary colour is yellow.

Shades of blue labeled with HSL, RGB, and web color names.

=== Blue (CMYK) (pigment blue) ===
Blue (CMYK) (pigment blue)
- Cyan, magenta, and yellow are the three subtractive primary colors used in printing

Color coordinates
- Hex triplet: #333399
- sRGB^{B} (r, g, b): (51, 51, 153)
- HSV (h, s, v): (240°, 67%, 60%)
- CIELCh_{uv} (L, C, h): (28, 73, 266°)
- ISCC–NBS descriptor: Vivid blue
- B: Normalized to [0–255] (byte)

The color defined as blue in the CMYK color system used in printing, also known as pigment blue, is the tone of blue that is achieved by mixing process (printer's) cyan and process (printer's) magenta in equal proportions.

The purpose of the CMYK color system is to provide the maximum possible gamut of color reproducible in printing by the use of only three primaries.

The color indicated is only approximate as the colors of printing inks may vary.

=== Blue (Pantone) ===
Blue (Pantone)

Color coordinates
- Hex triplet: #0018A8
- sRGB^{B} (r, g, b): (0, 24, 168)
- HSV (h, s, v): (231°, 100%, 66%)
- CIELCh_{uv} (L, C, h): (22, 82, 265°)
- ISCC–NBS descriptor: Vivid blue
- B: Normalized to [0–255] (byte)

Blue (Pantone) is the color that is called blue in Pantone.

The source of this color is the "Pantone Textile Paper eXtended (TPX)" color list, color # Blue C, EC, HC, M, PC, U, or UP—Blue.

=== Blue (NCS) (psychological primary blue) ===
Blue (NCS)
- Approximations within the sRGB gamut to the primary colors of the Natural Color System, a model based on the opponent process theory of color vision

Color coordinates
- Hex triplet: #0087BD
- sRGB^{B} (r, g, b): (0, 135, 189)
- HSV (h, s, v): (197°, 100%, 74%)
- CIELCh_{uv} (L, C, h): (53, 65, 237°)
- Source: sRGB approximation to NCS 2060-B
- ISCC–NBS descriptor: Moderate blue
- B: Normalized to [0–255] (byte)

The color defined as blue in the NCS or Natural Color System is an azure-like color. The Natural Color System is a color system based on the four unique hues or psychological primary colors red, yellow, green, and blue. The NCS is based on the opponent process theory of vision.

The "Natural Color System" is widely used in Scandinavia.

NCS Blue can only be displayed approximately on a computer screen, as these spectral colors have been adjusted to fit into the sRGB gamut. In the 21st century, this hue is classified as a variation of azure that is on the border of cyan.

=== Blue (Munsell) ===
Blue (Munsell)
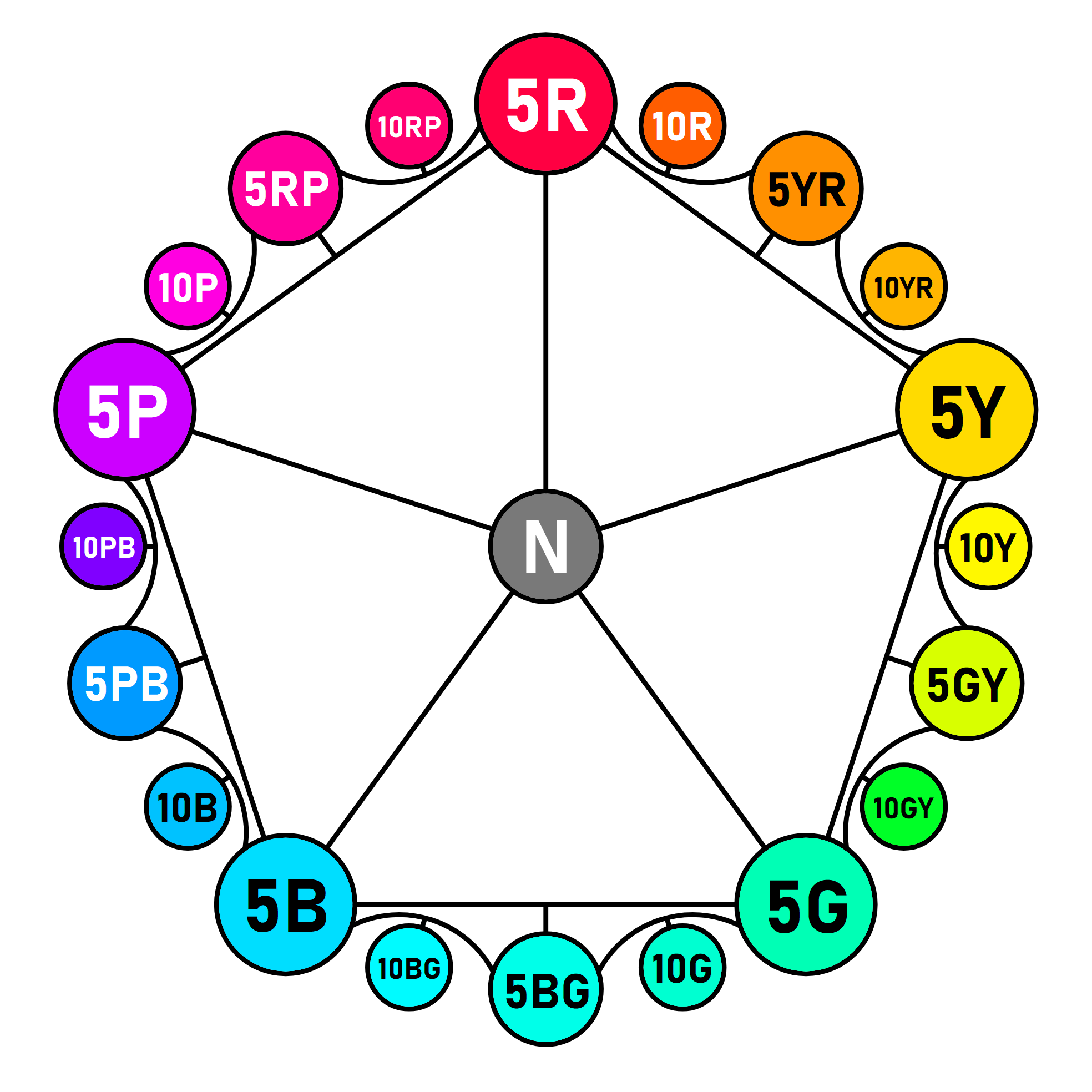
- The hues of the Munsell color system, at varying values, and maximum chroma to stay in the sRGB gamut

Color coordinates
- Hex triplet: #00DEFF
- sRGB^{B} (r, g, b): (0, 222, 255)
- HSV (h, s, v): (188°, 100%, 100%)
- CIELCh_{uv} (L, C, h): (82, 73, 215°)
- ISCC–NBS descriptor: Strong greenish blue
- B: Normalized to [0–255] (byte)

The Munsell color system is a color space that specifies colors based on three color dimensions: hue, value (lightness), and chroma (colorfulness), spaced uniformly (in terms of human perception) in three dimensions in the Munsell color solid. In order for all the colors to be spaced uniformly, it was found necessary to use a color wheel with five, non-arbitrary, equally spaced primary colors: red, yellow, green, blue, and purple.

The color of the sample is the most chromatic (colorful) blue in the sRGB gamut that falls in the hue of 5B (primary blue) in the Munsell color space. In the 21st century, this blue is classified as an intermediate between azure and cyan.

== Tints, shades, and variations of blue ==
The term tint and shade is used in its technical sense as used in color theory.

In this section, the term 'tint' usually refers to a blueish color mixed with white or light gray. The term shade is used in its technical sense as used in color theory, meaning a blueish color mixed with black or dark gray.

The colors arranged in order of their value (brightness) (V in the HSV code), the brighter colors toward the top and the darker colors toward the bottom.

=== Argentinian blue ===
Argentinian Blue
- Flag of Argentina

Color coordinates
- Hex triplet: #74ACDF
- sRGB^{B} (r, g, b): (116, 172, 223)
- HSV (h, s, v): (209°, 48%, 87%)
- CIELCh_{uv} (L, C, h): (68, 56, 242°)
- ISCC–NBS descriptor: Light blue
- B: Normalized to [0–255] (byte)

The web color Argentinian blue is a light azure color seen on the national flag of Argentina.

=== Baby blue ===
Baby blue

Color coordinates
- Hex triplet: #89CFF0
- sRGB^{B} (r, g, b): (137, 207, 240)
- HSV (h, s, v): (199°, 43%, 94%)
- CIELCh_{uv} (L, C, h): (80, 48, 227°)
- Source: Maerz & Paul (1930)
- ISCC–NBS descriptor: Very light greenish blue
- B: Normalized to [0–255] (byte)

Baby blue is known as one of the pastel colors.

This color is associated with baby boys in Western culture.

The first recorded use of baby blue as a color name in English was in 1892.

=== B'dazzled blue ===
B'dazzled Blue

Color coordinates
- Hex triplet: #2E5894
- sRGB^{B} (r, g, b): (46, 88, 148)
- HSV (h, s, v): (215°, 69%, 58%)
- CIELCh_{uv} (L, C, h): (37, 56, 253°)
- Source: Crayola
- ISCC–NBS descriptor: Moderate blue
- B: Normalized to [0–255] (byte)

B'dazzled blue is a color in Crayola Metallic FX, a specialty set of Crayola crayons introduced in 2001.

=== Bleu de France ===
Bleu de France

Color coordinates
- Hex triplet: #318CE7
- sRGB^{B} (r, g, b): (49, 140, 231)
- HSV (h, s, v): (210°, 79%, 91%)
- CIELCh_{uv} (L, C, h): (57, 90, 250°)
- ISCC–NBS descriptor: Vivid blue
- B: Normalized to [0–255] (byte)

Bleu de France is a vivid blue color that has been associated in heraldry with the Kings of France since the 12th century.

=== Bluebonnet ===
Bluebonnet
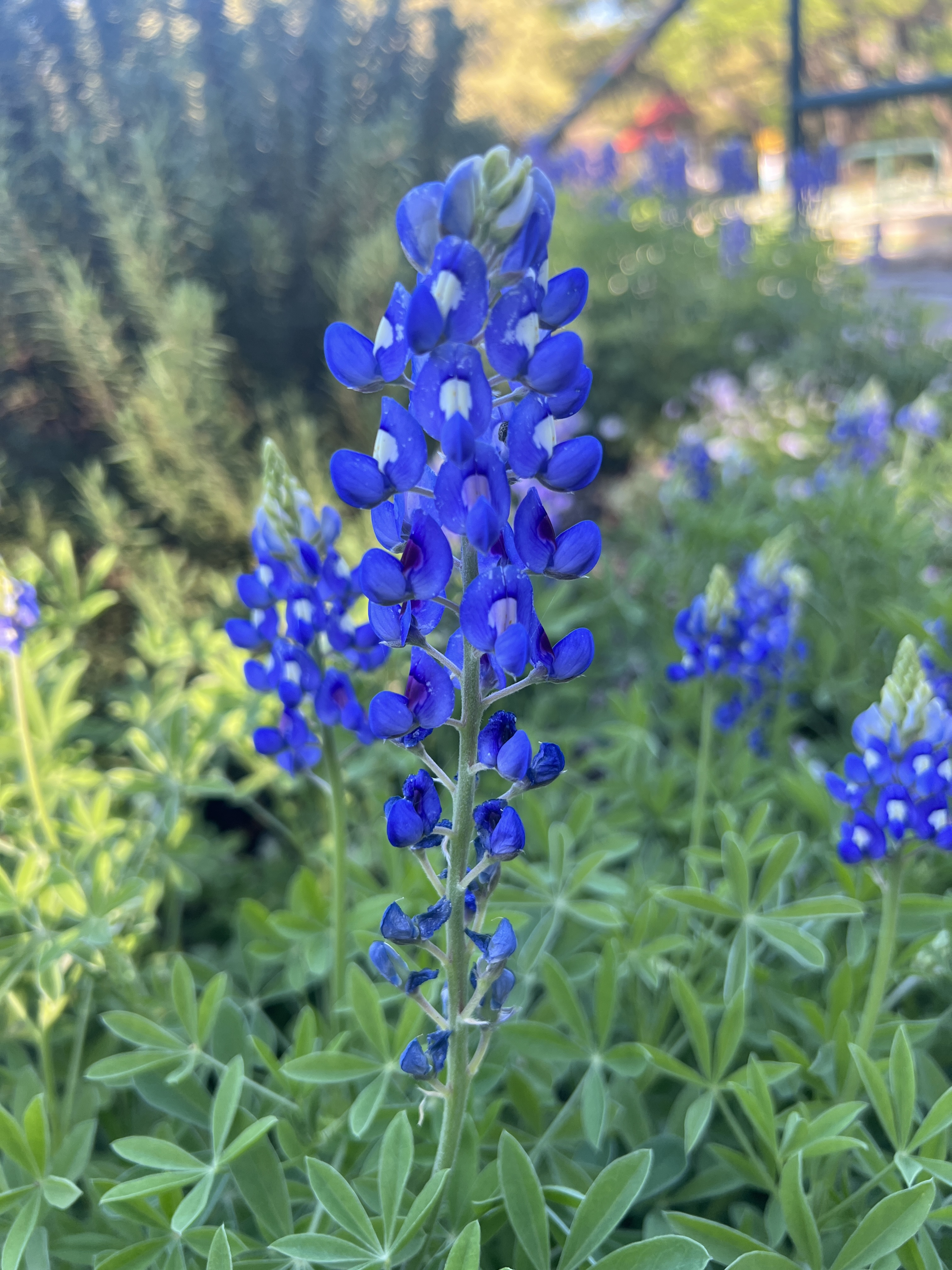
- Bluebonnet flowers

Color coordinates
- Hex triplet: #1C1CF0
- sRGB^{B} (r, g, b): (28, 28, 240)
- HSV (h, s, v): (240°, 88%, 94%)
- CIELCh_{uv} (L, C, h): (33, 124, 266°)
- B: Normalized to [0–255] (byte)

Bluebonnet is a bright shade of blue with a slight violet tinge. It represents the color of bluebonnet flowers, which are part of the lupin family. The bluebonnet is the state flower of Texas.

=== Blue sapphire ===
Blue Sapphire

Color coordinates
- Hex triplet: #126180
- sRGB^{B} (r, g, b): (18, 97, 128)
- HSV (h, s, v): (197°, 86%, 50%)
- CIELCh_{uv} (L, C, h): (38, 40, 232°)
- Source: Pantone TPX
- ISCC–NBS descriptor: Dark greenish blue
- B: Normalized to [0–255] (byte)

Displayed at right is the color blue sapphire.

The source of this color is the Pantone Textile Paper Extended (TPX) color list color #18-4231 "Blue Sapphire".

=== Celtic blue ===
Celtic Blue

Colour coordinates
- Hex triplet: #246BCE
- sRGB^{B} (r, g, b): (36, 107, 206)
- HSV (h, s, v): (215°, 83%, 81%)
- CIELCh_{uv} (L, C, h): (46, 91, 255°)
- ISCC–NBS descriptor: Vivid blue
- B: Normalized to [0–255] (byte)

Celtic blue is a shade of blue, also known as glas celtig in Welsh, or gorm ceilteach in both the Irish language and in Scottish Gaelic. Julius Caesar reported (in Commentarii de Bello Gallico) that the Britanni used to colour their bodies blue with vitrum, a word that means primarily "glass", but also the domestic name for the "woad" (Isatis tinctoria), besides the Gaulish loanword glastum (from Proto-Celtic *glastos "green"). The connection seems to be that both glass and the woad are "water-like" (lat. vitrum is from Proto-Indo-European *wed-ro- "water-like").

=== Connor's Lakefront ===
Connor's Lakefront (SW 9060)

Color coordinates
- Hex triplet: #175A6C
- sRGB^{B} (r, g, b): (23, 90, 108)
- HSV (h, s, v): (193°, 79%, 42%)
- CIELCh_{uv} (L, C, h): (35, 30, 221°)
- ISCC–NBS descriptor: Very dark cyan
- B: Normalized to [0–255] (byte)

Connor's Lakefront is a dark shade of greenish blue. It is one of the Sherwin-Williams paint colors.

=== Cool black ===
Cool black (PMS 295)

Color coordinates
- Hex triplet: #002E63
- sRGB^{B} (r, g, b): (0, 46, 99)
- HSV (h, s, v): (212°, 100%, 39%)
- CIELCh_{uv} (L, C, h): (19, 41, 255°)
- ISCC–NBS descriptor: Very dark blue
- B: Normalized to [0–255] (byte)

Cool black is a dark shade of blue. It is one of the Pantone colors.

=== Dark blue ===
Dark Blue

Color coordinates
- Hex triplet: #00008B
- sRGB^{B} (r, g, b): (0, 0, 139)
- HSV (h, s, v): (240°, 100%, 55%)
- CIELCh_{uv} (L, C, h): (15, 60, 266°)
- Source: X11
- ISCC–NBS descriptor: Vivid blue
- B: Normalized to [0–255] (byte)

Dark blue is a shade of the standard (h = 240°) blue.

=== Dark sapphire ===
Dark Sapphire

Color coordinates
- Hex triplet: #082567
- sRGB^{B} (r, g, b): (8, 37, 103)
- HSV (h, s, v): (222°, 92%, 40%)
- CIELCh_{uv} (L, C, h): (17, 45, 260°)
- ISCC–NBS descriptor: Deep blue
- B: Normalized to [0–255] (byte)

Dark sapphire is a dark tone of sapphire.

=== Delft blue ===
Delft Blue

Color coordinates
- Hex triplet: #1F305E
- sRGB^{B} (r, g, b): (31, 48, 94)
- HSV (h, s, v): (224°, 67%, 37%)
- CIELCh_{uv} (L, C, h): (21, 35, 258°)
- ISCC–NBS descriptor: Dark blue
- B: Normalized to [0–255] (byte)

Delft blue is a dark blue color.

The name is derived from the Dutch pottery Delftware, also known simply as "Delft Blue".

=== Duck blue ===
Duck Blue

Color coordinates
- Hex triplet: #007791
- sRGB^{B} (r, g, b): (0, 119, 145)
- HSV (h, s, v): (191°, 100%, 57%)
- CIELCh_{uv} (L, C, h): (46, 44, 222°)
- ISCC–NBS descriptor: Moderate greenish blue
- B: Normalized to [0–255] (byte)

Duck blue is a moderate greenish blue.

=== Egyptian blue ===
Egyptian Blue

Color coordinates
- Hex triplet: #1034A6
- sRGB^{B} (r, g, b): (16, 52, 166)
- HSV (h, s, v): (226°, 90%, 65%)
- CIELCh_{uv} (L, C, h): (28, 82, 263°)
- ISCC–NBS descriptor: Vivid blue
- B: Normalized to [0–255] (byte)

Egyptian blue is a pigment that was used in Ancient Egypt.

=== Fluorescent blue ===
Fluorescent blue
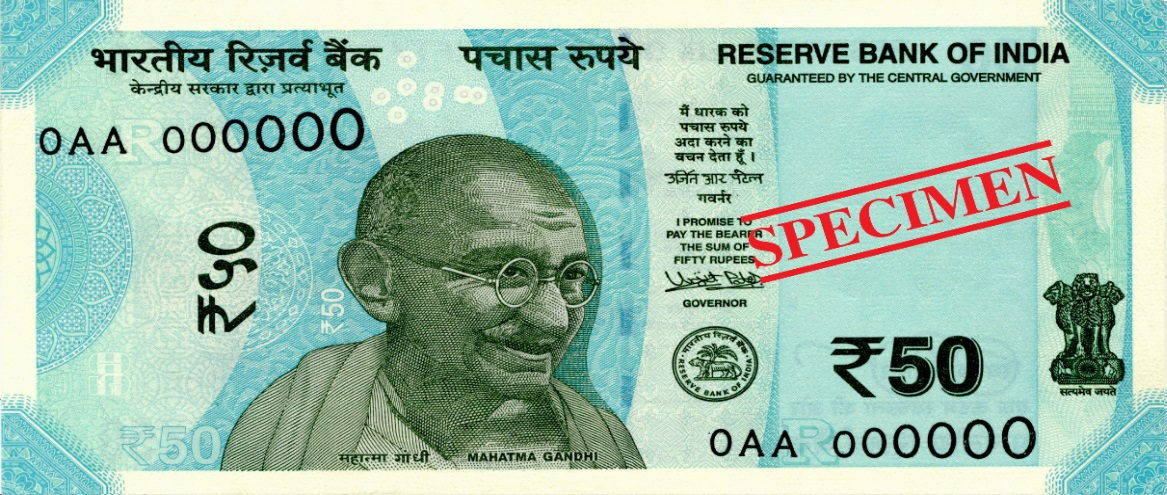
- Indian 50 rupee note, obverse

Color coordinates
- Hex triplet: #15F4EE
- sRGB^{B} (r, g, b): (21, 244, 238)
- HSV (h, s, v): (178°, 91%, 96%)
- CIELCh_{uv} (L, C, h): (87, 68, 188°)
- ISCC–NBS descriptor: Brilliant bluish green
- B: Normalized to [0–255] (byte)

Fluorescent blue is a shade of blue that is radiant based on fluorescence. This is the main color on the Indian 50-rupee note.

=== Independence ===
Independence

Color coordinates
- Hex triplet: #4C516D
- sRGB^{B} (r, g, b): (76, 81, 109)
- HSV (h, s, v): (231°, 30%, 43%)
- CIELCh_{uv} (L, C, h): (35, 23, 260°)
- ISCC–NBS descriptor: Dark blue
- B: Normalized to [0–255] (byte)

Independence is a dark blue color.

The first recorded use of independence as a color name in English was in 1927.

=== International Klein Blue ===
International Klein Blue

Color coordinates
- Hex triplet: #002FA7
- sRGB^{B} (r, g, b): (0, 47, 167)
- HSV (h, s, v): (223°, 100%, 65%)
- CIELCh_{uv} (L, C, h): (26, 83, 263°)
- B: Normalized to [0–255] (byte)

International Klein Blue (IKB) is a deep blue hue first mixed by the French artist Yves Klein. IKB's visual impact comes from its heavy reliance on ultramarine, as well as Klein's often thick and textured application of paint to canvas. Klein never patented the color, only submitting a Soleau envelope without progressing to the patent stage.

=== King blue ===
King Blue

Color coordinates
- Hex triplet: #375184
- sRGB^{B} (r, g, b): (55, 81, 132)
- HSV (h, s, v): (220°, 58%, 52%)
- CIELCh_{uv} (L, C, h): (35, 46, 255°)
- Source: My Perfect Color
- B: Normalized to [0–255] (byte)

Displayed as right is the color king blue, a variant of sapphire with a violet tone.

=== Liberty ===
Liberty

Color coordinates
- Hex triplet: #545AA7
- sRGB^{B} (r, g, b): (84, 90, 167)
- HSV (h, s, v): (236°, 50%, 65%)
- CIELCh_{uv} (L, C, h): (41, 64, 264°)
- ISCC–NBS descriptor: Strong blue
- B: Normalized to [0–255] (byte)

Liberty is a strong blue color.

The first recorded use of liberty as a color name in English was in 1918.

=== Light blue ===
Light blue

Color coordinates
- Hex triplet: #ADD8E6
- sRGB^{B} (r, g, b): (173, 216, 230)
- HSV (h, s, v): (195°, 25%, 90%)
- CIELCh_{uv} (L, C, h): (84, 28, 216°)
- Source: X11
- ISCC–NBS descriptor: Very light greenish blue
- B: Normalized to [0–255] (byte)

The web color light blue is part of the X11 color system, with a hue code of 194. Variations of this color are known as sky blue, baby blue, or angel blue.

The first recorded use of "light blue" as a color term in English is in 1915.

=== Medium blue ===
Medium Blue

Color coordinates
- Hex triplet: #0000CD
- sRGB^{B} (r, g, b): (0, 0, 205)
- HSV (h, s, v): (240°, 100%, 80%)
- CIELCh_{uv} (L, C, h): (25, 101, 266°)
- Source: X11
- ISCC–NBS descriptor: Vivid blue
- B: Normalized to [0–255] (byte)

The web color medium blue is a shade of the standard (h = 240°) blue.

=== Medium sapphire ===
Medium Sapphire

Color coordinates
- Hex triplet: #2D5DA1
- sRGB^{B} (r, g, b): (45, 93, 161)
- HSV (h, s, v): (215°, 72%, 63%)
- CIELCh_{uv} (L, C, h): (40, 63, 253°)
- Source: Crayola
- ISCC–NBS descriptor: Strong blue
- B: Normalized to [0–255] (byte)

Medium sapphire is the color called sapphire in Crayola Gem Tones, a specialty set of Crayola crayons introduced in 1994.

=== Midnight blue ===
Midnight Blue

Color coordinates
- Hex triplet: #191970
- sRGB^{B} (r, g, b): (25, 25, 112)
- HSV (h, s, v): (240°, 78%, 44%)
- CIELCh_{uv} (L, C, h): (16, 49, 266°)
- Source: X11
- ISCC–NBS descriptor: Vivid blue
- B: Normalized to [0–255] (byte)

Midnight blue is an X11 web color. This color was originally called midnight. The first recorded use of midnight as a color name in English was in 1915.

=== Moroccan blue ===
Moroccan blue

Color coordinates
- Hex triplet: #468FEA
- sRGB^{B} (r, g, b): (70, 143, 234)
- HSV (h, s, v): (213°, 70%, 92%)
- CIELCh_{uv} (L, C, h): (59, 89, 252°)
- ISCC–NBS descriptor: Vivid blue
- B: Normalized to [0–255] (byte)

Moroccan blue (also Chefchaouen blue) is a vivid blue color.

=== Navy blue ===
Navy Blue

Color coordinates
- Hex triplet: #000080
- sRGB^{B} (r, g, b): (0, 0, 128)
- HSV (h, s, v): (240°, 100%, 50%)
- CIELCh_{uv} (L, C, h): (13, 52, 266°)
- Source: HTML/CSS
- ISCC–NBS descriptor: Vivid blue
- B: Normalized to [0–255] (byte)

Navy blue is a shade of the standard (h = 240°) blue. Navy blue got its name from the dark blue (contrasted with white) worn by sailors in the Royal Navy since 1748 (originally called marine blue before 1840) and subsequently adopted by other navies around the world.

The first recorded use of navy blue as a color name in English was in 1840.

=== Neon blue ===
Neon Blue
- A neon blue sign

Color coordinates
- Hex triplet: #4D4DFF
- sRGB^{B} (r, g, b): (77, 77, 255)
- HSV (h, s, v): (240°, 70%, 100%)
- CIELCh_{uv} (L, C, h): (44, 131, 266°)
- ISCC–NBS descriptor: Vivid purplish blue
- B: Normalized to [0–255] (byte)

Neon blue is a vivid purplish blue.

=== Periwinkle ===
Periwinkle
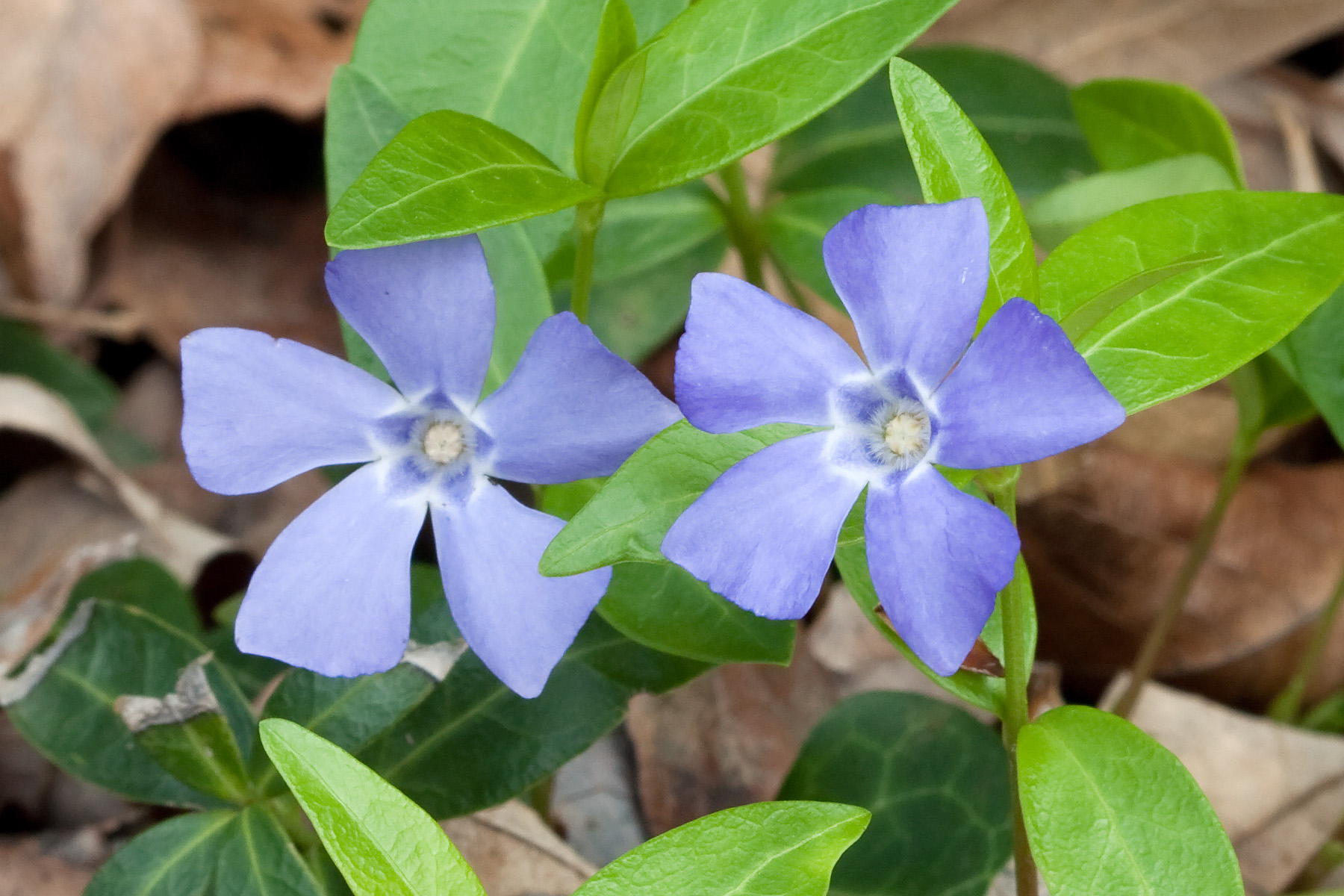
- Periwinkle flowers

Color coordinates
- Hex triplet: #CCCCFF
- sRGB^{B} (r, g, b): (204, 204, 255)
- HSV (h, s, v): (240°, 20%, 100%)
- CIELCh_{uv} (L, C, h): (84, 42, 266°)
- Source: Maerz and Paul
- ISCC–NBS descriptor: Very light purplish blue
- B: Normalized to [0–255] (byte)

Periwinkle (also periwinkle blue or lavender blue) is a mixture of white, blue, and red. It is named after the Periwinkle flower and is also commonly referred to as a tone of light blue.

=== Picotee blue ===
Picotee Blue

Color coordinates
- Hex triplet: #2E2787
- sRGB^{B} (r, g, b): (46, 39, 135)
- HSV (h, s, v): (244°, 71%, 53%)
- CIELCh_{uv} (L, C, h): (23, 63, 267°)
- B: Normalized to [0–255] (byte)

Picotee blue represents the color of the picotee flower. It is a deep shade of indigo, almost resembling St. Patrick's blue.

=== Polynesian blue ===
Polynesian Blue

Color coordinates
- Hex triplet: #224C98
- sRGB^{B} (r, g, b): (34, 76, 152)
- HSV (h, s, v): (219°, 78%, 60%)
- CIELCh_{uv} (L, C, h): (34, 66, 257°)
- ISCC–NBS descriptor: Vivid blue
- B: Normalized to [0–255] (byte)

Polynesian blue is a dark blue color, almost navy.

=== Powder blue ===
Powder Blue

Color coordinates
- Hex triplet: #B0E0E6
- sRGB^{B} (r, g, b): (176, 224, 230)
- HSV (h, s, v): (187°, 23%, 90%)
- CIELCh_{uv} (L, C, h): (86, 26, 202°)
- Source: X11
- ISCC–NBS descriptor: Very light bluish green
- B: Normalized to [0–255] (byte)

Powder blue is a light bluish green.

The first recorded use of powder blue as a color name in English was in 1774. It is a web color.

=== Process blue ===
Process Blue C

Color coordinates
- Hex triplet: #0085CA
- sRGB^{B} (r, g, b): (0, 133, 202)
- HSV (h, s, v): (200°, 100%, 79%)
- CIELCh_{uv} (L, C, h): (53, 75, 244°)
- Source: Pantone
- ISCC–NBS descriptor: Brilliant greenish blue
- B: Normalized to [0–255] (byte)

Process blue is a Pantone-defined shade used by the football team the Carolina Panthers and is sometimes consequently called "Carolina blue" or "Panther blue".

=== Resolution blue ===
Resolution Blue

Color coordinates
- Hex triplet: #002387
- sRGB^{B} (r, g, b): (0, 35, 135)
- HSV (h, s, v): (224°, 100%, 53%)
- CIELCh_{uv} (L, C, h): (20, 64, 263°)
- ISCC–NBS descriptor: Vivid blue
- B: Normalized to [0–255] (byte)

Resolution blue is a vivid blue color. The color name dates back to at least 2001, and came into wider use when the Resene Paints colors were used as one of the sources for the Xona Games Color List. Many of Resene's shades of blue and cyan are named after places in New Zealand's Marlborough Sounds, where Resolution Bay is located.

=== Robin Egg Blue ===
Robin Egg Blue

Color coordinates
- Hex triplet: #96DED1
- sRGB^{B} (r, g, b): (150, 222, 209)
- HSV (h, s, v): (169°, 32%, 87%)
- CIELCh_{uv} (L, C, h): (84, 35, 175°)
- ISCC–NBS descriptor: Very Light Greenish Blue
- B: Normalized to [0–255] (byte)

Robin Egg Blue is a pale shade of blue-green, whose name comes from the color of the eggs of the American robin, a bird native to North America whose egg pigment, called biliverdin, is responsible for this color.

=== Ruddy blue ===
Ruddy Blue
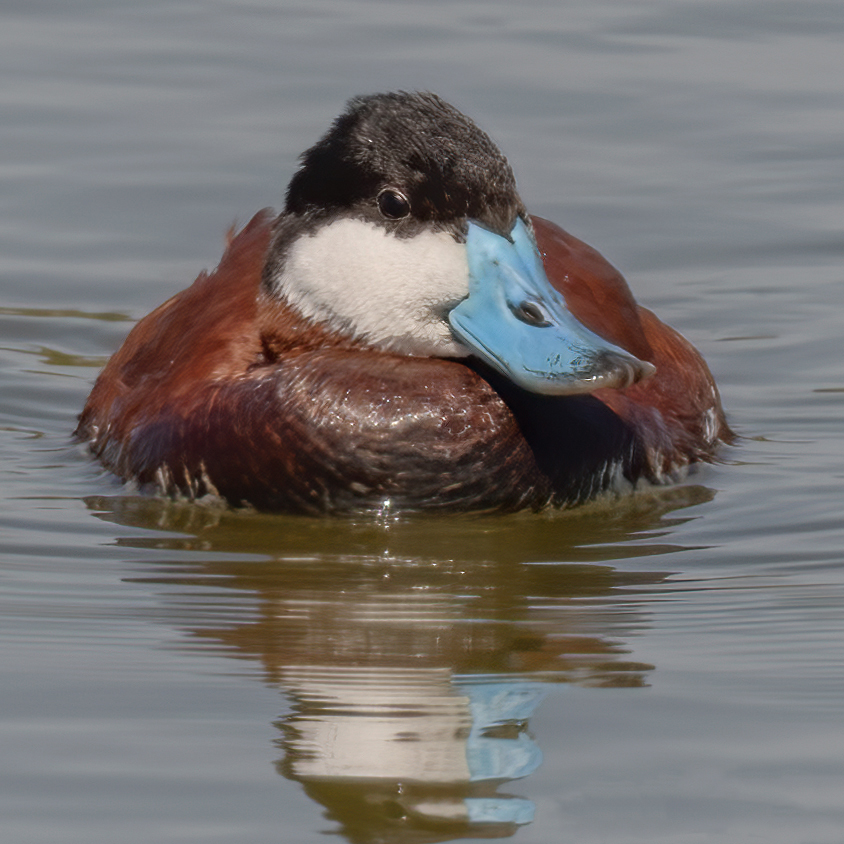
- Male Ruddy duck

Color coordinates
- Hex triplet: #76ABDF
- sRGB^{B} (r, g, b): (118, 171, 223)
- HSV (h, s, v): (210°, 47%, 87%)
- CIELCh_{uv} (L, C, h): (68, 56, 243°)
- ISCC–NBS descriptor: Brilliant blue
- B: Normalized to [0–255] (byte)

Ruddy blue represents the coloring of the beak of the ruddy duck.

=== Sapphire ===
Sapphire
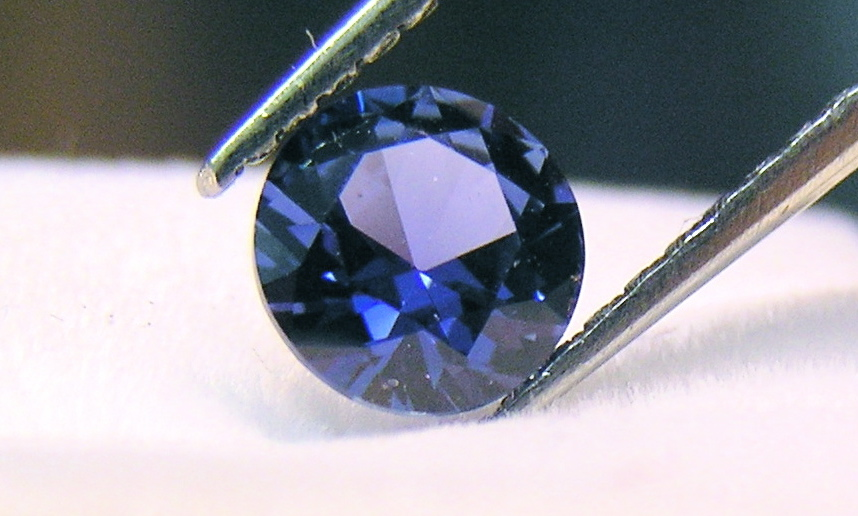
- Sapphire gemstone

Color coordinates
- Hex triplet: #082567
- sRGB^{B} (r, g, b): (8, 37, 103)
- HSV (h, s, v): (222°, 92%, 40%)
- CIELCh_{uv} (L, C, h): (17, 45, 260°)
- ISCC–NBS descriptor: Deep blue
- B: Normalized to [0–255] (byte)

Sapphire is a saturated shade of blue, referring to the gemstone of the same name. Sapphire gems most commonly occur in a range of blue shades, although they can come in many different colors.

The first recorded use of sapphire as a color name in English was in 1430.

Medium sapphire is the color called sapphire in Crayola Gem Tones, a specialty set of Crayola crayons introduced in 1994. B'dazzled blue is a color in Crayola Metallic FX, a specialty set of Crayola crayons introduced in 2001. the Pantone Textile Paper Extended (TPX) color list color #18-4231 describes "Blue Sapphire". King blue is a variant of sapphire with a violet tone. Dark sapphire is a dark tone of sapphire.

=== Sapphire (Maerz and Paul) ===
Sapphire

Color coordinates
- Hex triplet: #0F52BA
- sRGB^{B} (r, g, b): (15, 82, 186)
- HSV (h, s, v): (216°, 92%, 73%)
- CIELCh_{uv} (L, C, h): (37, 88, 258°)
- Source: Maerz and Paul
- ISCC–NBS descriptor: Vivid blue
- B: Normalized to [0–255] (byte)

Displayed at right is the color sapphire used in A Dictionary of Color by Maerz and Paul.

The first recorded use of sapphire as a color name in English was in 1430.

=== Sapphire blue ===
Sapphire Blue

Color coordinates
- Hex triplet: #0067A5
- sRGB^{B} (r, g, b): (0, 103, 165)
- HSV (h, s, v): (203°, 100%, 65%)
- CIELCh_{uv} (L, C, h): (42, 64, 246°)
- Source: ISCC-NBS
- ISCC–NBS descriptor: Strong blue
- B: Normalized to [0–255] (byte)

At right is displayed the color sapphire blue.

=== Savoy blue ===
Savoy blue

Color coordinates
- Hex triplet: #4B61D1
- sRGB^{B} (r, g, b): (75, 97, 209)
- HSV (h, s, v): (230°, 64%, 82%)
- CIELCh_{uv} (L, C, h): (45, 94, 262°)
- ISCC–NBS descriptor: Vivid blue
- B: Normalized to [0–255] (byte)

Savoy blue, or savoy azure, is a shade of saturation blue between peacock blue and periwinkle, lighter than peacock blue. It owes its name to its being the color of the House of Savoy, a ruling dynasty in Italy from 1861 to 1946.

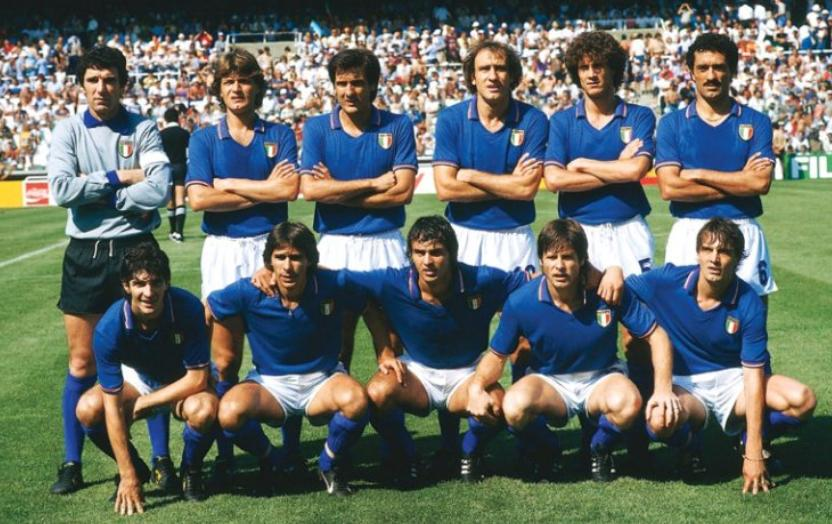
The Italy national football team at the 1982 FIFA World Cup

Having become a national color with the unification of Italy (1861), its use continued even after the birth of the Italian Republic (1946) with the name "Italian blue". An Italian-blue border was inserted on the edge of the Presidential Standard of Italy and the use of the blue scarf for the Italian Armed Forces' officers, for the presidents of the Italian provinces during the official ceremonies and of the blue jersey for Italian national sports teams it was also maintained in the Republican era.

=== Smalt ===
Smalt

Color coordinates
- Hex triplet: #003399
- sRGB^{B} (r, g, b): (0, 51, 153)
- HSV (h, s, v): (220°, 100%, 60%)
- CIELCh_{uv} (L, C, h): (26, 74, 261°)
- ISCC–NBS descriptor: Vivid blue
- B: Normalized to [0–255] (byte)

Smalt has also been known under other names such as azurblau, Bohemian Blue, Dutch Ultramarine, enamel blue, Isenburg Blue. It was also known by many as Saxon Blue since the primary sources of cobalt ore used to make it were located in Saxony.

Smalt predates Thénard's Blue by several to many hundreds of years, which turned up as a result of the French government's famed search for a synthetic version of Lapis Lazuli. The Napoleonic administration appointed Louis-Jacques Thénard to find a substitute for Lapis Lazuli, and instead he found Cobalt Blue.

=== Space cadet ===
Space Cadet

Color coordinates
- Hex triplet: #1E2952
- sRGB^{B} (r, g, b): (30, 41, 82)
- HSV (h, s, v): (227°, 63%, 32%)
- CIELCh_{uv} (L, C, h): (18, 29, 260°)
- ISCC–NBS descriptor: Dark blue
- B: Normalized to [0–255] (byte)

Space cadet is one of the colors on the Resene Color List, a color list popular in Australia and New Zealand. The color "space cadet" was formulated in 2007.

=== Spanish blue ===
Spanish Blue

Color coordinates
- Hex triplet: #0070B8
- sRGB^{B} (r, g, b): (0, 112, 184)
- HSV (h, s, v): (203°, 100%, 72%)
- CIELCh_{uv} (L, C, h): (46, 73, 248°)
- Source: Gallego and Sanz
- ISCC–NBS descriptor: Strong blue
- B: Normalized to [0–255] (byte)

Spanish blue is the color that is called Azul (the Spanish word for "blue") in the Guía de coloraciones (Guide to colorations) by Rosa Gallego and Juan Carlos Sanz, a color dictionary published in 2005 that is widely popular in the Hispanophone realm.

=== Teal blue ===
Teal blue

Color coordinates
- Hex triplet: #367588
- sRGB^{B} (r, g, b): (54, 117, 136)
- HSV (h, s, v): (194°, 60%, 53%)
- CIELCh_{uv} (L, C, h): (46, 34, 220°)
- ISCC–NBS descriptor: Moderate greenish blue
- B: Normalized to [0–255] (byte)

Teal blue is a medium tone of teal with more blue.

The first recorded use of teal blue as a color name in English was in 1927.

=== Twin blue ===
Twin Blue

Color coordinates
- Hex triplet: #BEDBED
- sRGB^{B} (r, g, b): (190, 219, 237)
- HSV (h, s, v): (203°, 20%, 93%)
- CIELCh_{uv} (L, C, h): (86, 24, 228°)
- B: Normalized to [0–255] (byte)

Twin Blue is so named since its HEX color code spells out "BED" twice. The color is also recognized for bearing close semblance to the light pastel shade of cyan common on bed sheets.

=== Ultramarine ===
Ultramarine
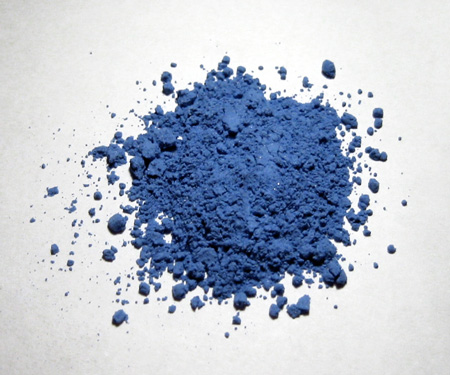
- Ultramarine pigment

Color coordinates
- Hex triplet: #120A8F
- sRGB^{B} (r, g, b): (18, 10, 143)
- HSV (h, s, v): (244°, 93%, 56%)
- CIELCh_{uv} (L, C, h): (17, 65, 266°)
- Source: Xona Games and ColorHexa
- ISCC–NBS descriptor: Vivid blue
- B: Normalized to [0–255] (byte)

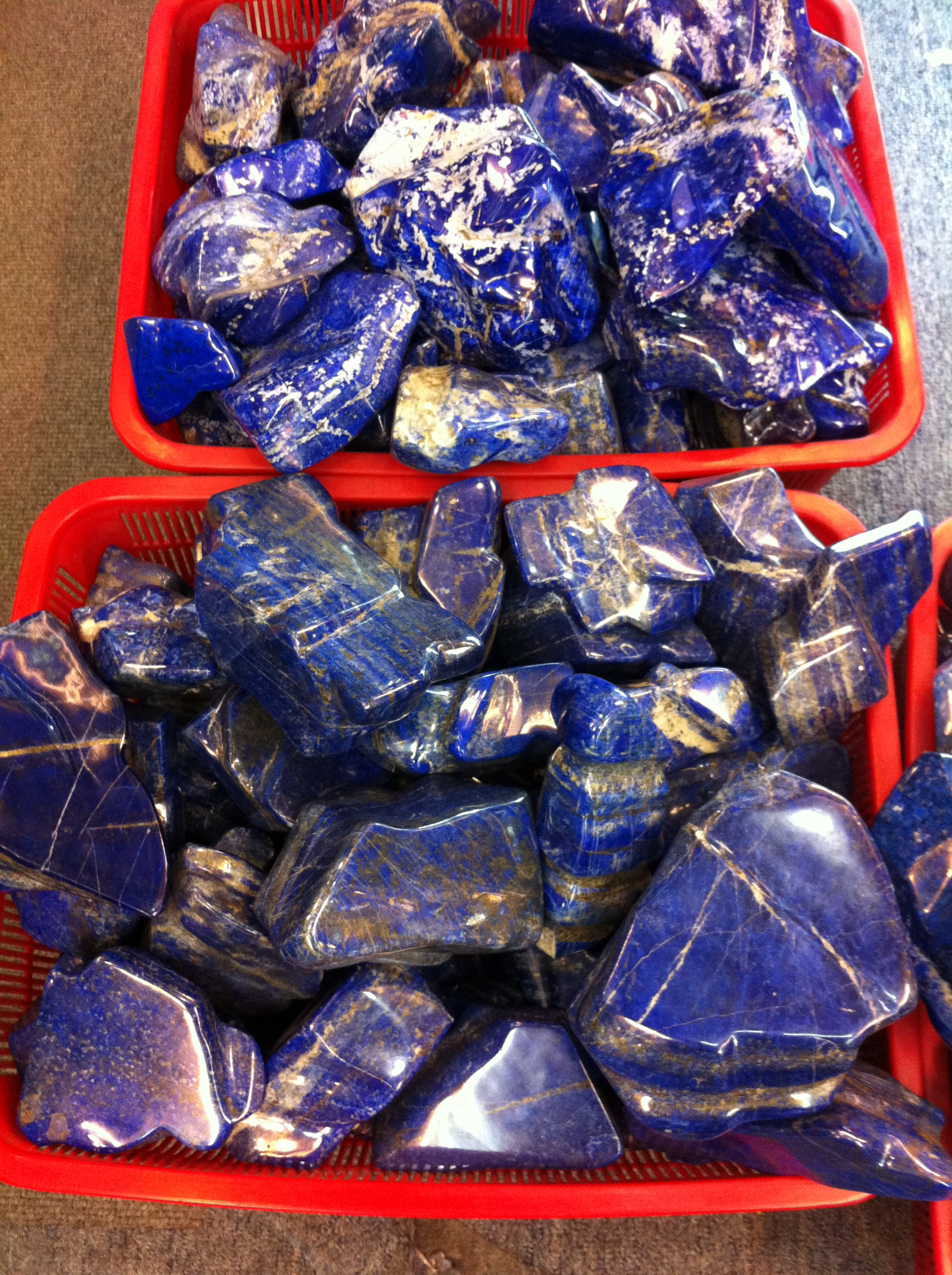
Lapis lazuli, the source of the ultramarine pigment

Ultramarine is a blue pigment in use since medieval times. It was originally derived from lapis lazuli, a bright blue mineral.

=== Uranian blue ===
Uranian Blue
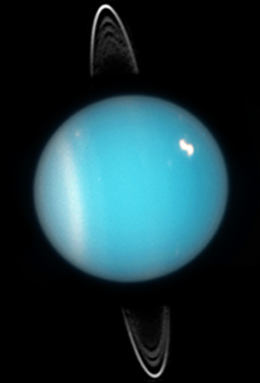
- Uranus with clouds

Color coordinates
- Hex triplet: #AFDBF5
- sRGB^{B} (r, g, b): (175, 219, 245)
- HSV (h, s, v): (202°, 29%, 96%)
- CIELCh_{uv} (L, C, h): (85, 35, 229°)
- ISCC–NBS descriptor: Very light greenish blue
- B: Normalized to [0–255] (byte)

Uranian blue is a light greenish blue, the color of the planet Uranus, which was named after Uranus, the primordial god of the sky and the heavens in Greek mythology.

=== Zaffer ===
Zaffer

Color coordinates
- Hex triplet: #0014A8
- sRGB^{B} (r, g, b): (0, 20, 168)
- HSV (h, s, v): (233°, 100%, 66%)
- CIELCh_{uv} (L, C, h): (21, 81, 265°)
- Source: X11
- ISCC–NBS descriptor: Deep blue
- B: Normalized to [0–255] (byte)

Zaffer (or Zaffre in British English), a prescientific, or alchemical substance, is a deep blue color that is obtained by roasting cobalt ore, and is made of either an impure form of cobalt oxide or impure cobalt arsenate. During the Victorian Era, zaffer was used to prepare smalt and to stain glass blue.

The first recorded use of zaffer as a color name in English was sometime in the 1550s (exact year uncertain).

== Shades of azure ==
Azure

Color coordinates
- Hex triplet: #0080FF
- sRGB^{B} (r, g, b): (0, 128, 255)
- HSV (h, s, v): (210°, 100%, 100%)
- CIELCh_{uv} (L, C, h): (55, 117, 255°)
- ISCC–NBS descriptor: Vivid blue
- B: Normalized to [0–255] (byte)

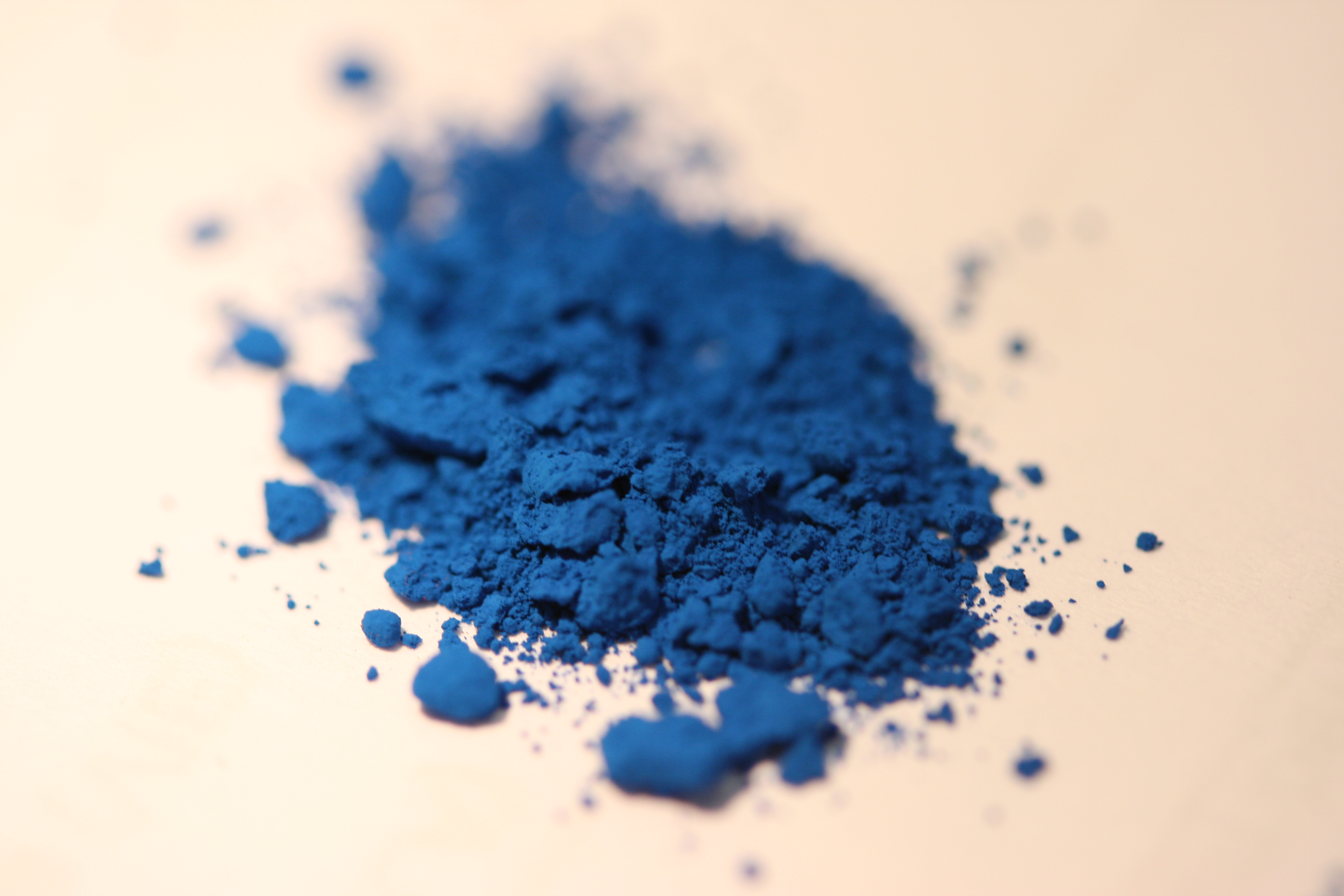
Azure pigment

Azure (/ˈæʒər, ˈeɪʒər/ AZH-ər, AY-zhər, UK also /ˈæzjʊər, ˈeɪzjʊər/ AZ-ure, AY-zure) is a variation of blue that is often described as the color of the sky on a clear day.

On the RGB color wheel, "azure" (hexadecimal #0080FF) is defined as the color at 210 degrees, i.e., the hue halfway between blue and cyan. In the RGB color model, used to create all the colors on a television or computer screen, azure is created by adding a little green light to blue light. The complementary color of azure is orange.

Shades of azure labeled with HSL, RGB, and web color names.

=== Azure (web color) ===
Azure mist

Color coordinates
- Hex triplet: #F0FFFF
- sRGB^{B} (r, g, b): (240, 255, 255)
- HSV (h, s, v): (180°, 6%, 100%)
- CIELCh_{uv} (L, C, h): (99, 8, 192°)
- Source: X11
- ISCC–NBS descriptor: Very pale cyan
- B: Normalized to [0–255] (byte)

In the X11 color system which became a standard for early web colors, azure is depicted as a pale cyan or whitish cyan rather than a shade of azure.

In an artistic context, this color could also be called azure mist or cyan mist.

=== Variations of azure ===
In this section, the term shade is used in its technical sense as used in color theory, meaning a blueish color mixed with black or dark gray. The colors arranged in order of their value (brightness) (V in the HSV code), the brighter colors toward the top and the darker colors toward the bottom.

==== Air Force blue ====
Air Force Blue

Color coordinates
- Hex triplet: #5D8AA8
- sRGB^{B} (r, g, b): (93, 138, 168)
- HSV (h, s, v): (204°, 45%, 66%)
- CIELCh_{uv} (L, C, h): (55, 37, 234°)
- Source: Vexillological:
- ISCC–NBS descriptor: Moderate greenish blue
- B: Normalized to [0–255] (byte)

Air force blue, also known as RAF blue, is used by the Royal Air Force, the first air force to choose an "air force blue" color by which to identify itself, in 1920.

The color "air force blue" is a medium tone of azure since it has a hue code of 204 which is a hue code between 195 and 225, signifying a tone of azure.

==== Alice blue ====
Alice Blue

Color coordinates
- Hex triplet: #F0F8FF
- sRGB^{B} (r, g, b): (240, 248, 255)
- HSV (h, s, v): (208°, 6%, 100%)
- CIELCh_{uv} (L, C, h): (97, 8, 233°)
- Source: X11
- ISCC–NBS descriptor: Greenish white
- B: Normalized to [0–255] (byte)

The web color Alice blue is a pale tint of azure.

==== Celestial blue ====
Celestial Blue

Color coordinates
- Hex triplet: #4997D0
- sRGB^{B} (r, g, b): (73, 151, 208)
- HSV (h, s, v): (205°, 65%, 82%)
- CIELCh_{uv} (L, C, h): (60, 64, 241°)
- ISCC–NBS descriptor: Light blue
- B: Normalized to [0–255] (byte)

The first recorded use of celestial blue as a color name in English was in 1535.

The source of this color is the Plochere Color System, a color system formulated in 1948 that is widely used by interior designers.

==== Cerulean ====
Cerulean

Color coordinates
- Hex triplet: #007BA7
- sRGB^{B} (r, g, b): (0, 123, 167)
- HSV (h, s, v): (196°, 100%, 65%)
- CIELCh_{uv} (L, C, h): (48, 56, 234°)
- ISCC–NBS descriptor: Strong greenish blue
- B: Normalized to [0–255] (byte)

The first recorded use of cerulean as a color name in English was in 1590.

The word is probably derived from the Latin word caeruleus, "dark blue, blue, or blue-green", which in turn probably derives from caelulum, diminutive of caelum, "heaven, sky".

==== Cloudy blue ====
Cloudy Blue

Color coordinates
- Hex triplet: #9BBCD8
- sRGB^{B} (r, g, b): (155, 188, 216)
- HSV (h, s, v): (208°, 28%, 85%)
- CIELCh_{uv} (L, C, h): (75, 32, 236°)
- ISCC–NBS descriptor: Light greenish blue
- B: Normalized to [0–255] (byte)

Cloudy blue is a light, opaque tone of azure.

==== Cornflower blue ====
Cornflower Blue

Color coordinates
- Hex triplet: #6495ED
- sRGB^{B} (r, g, b): (100, 149, 237)
- HSV (h, s, v): (219°, 58%, 93%)
- CIELCh_{uv} (L, C, h): (62, 83, 254°)
- Source: X11
- ISCC–NBS descriptor: Brilliant blue
- B: Normalized to [0–255] (byte)

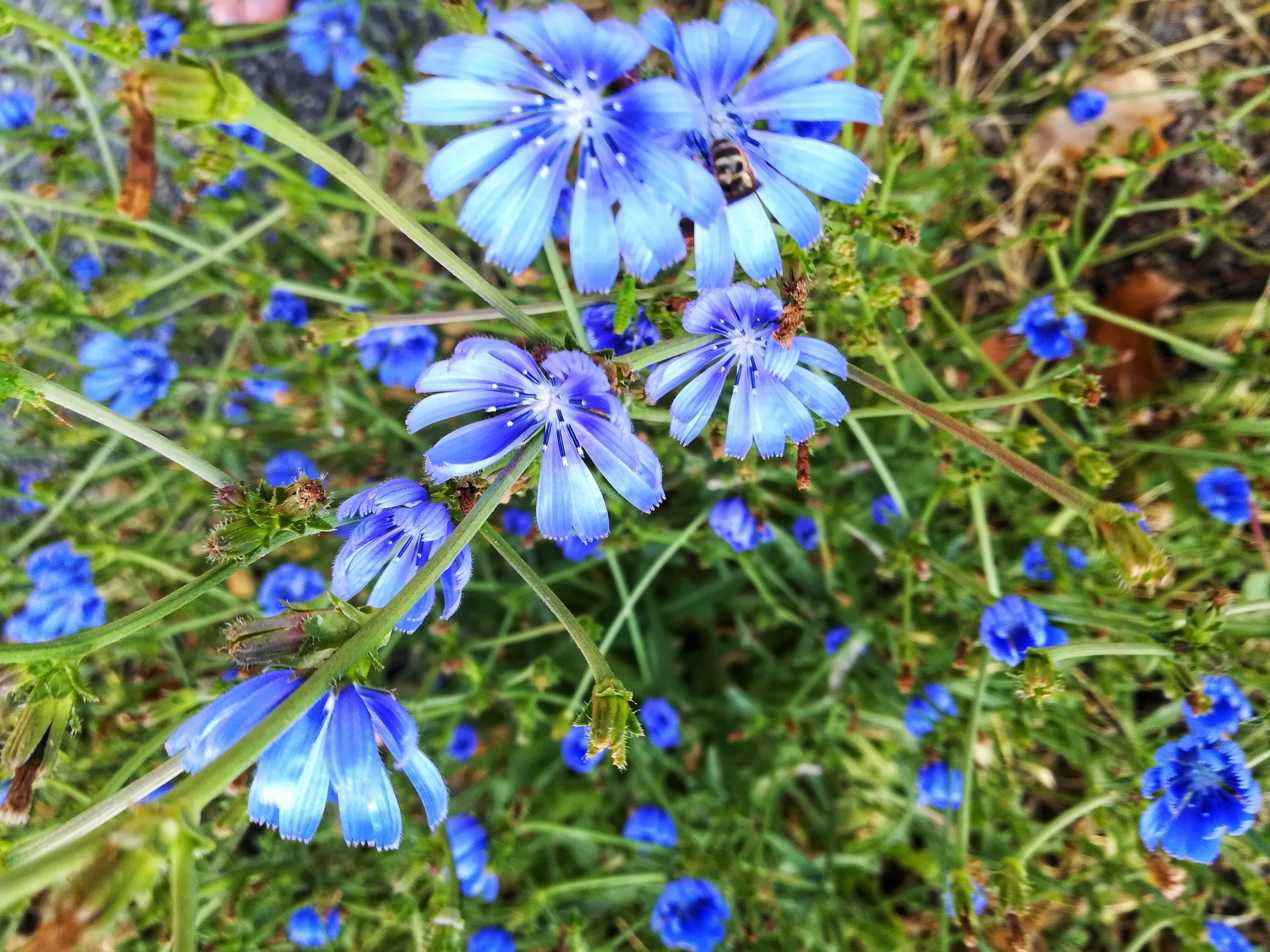
Cornflowers

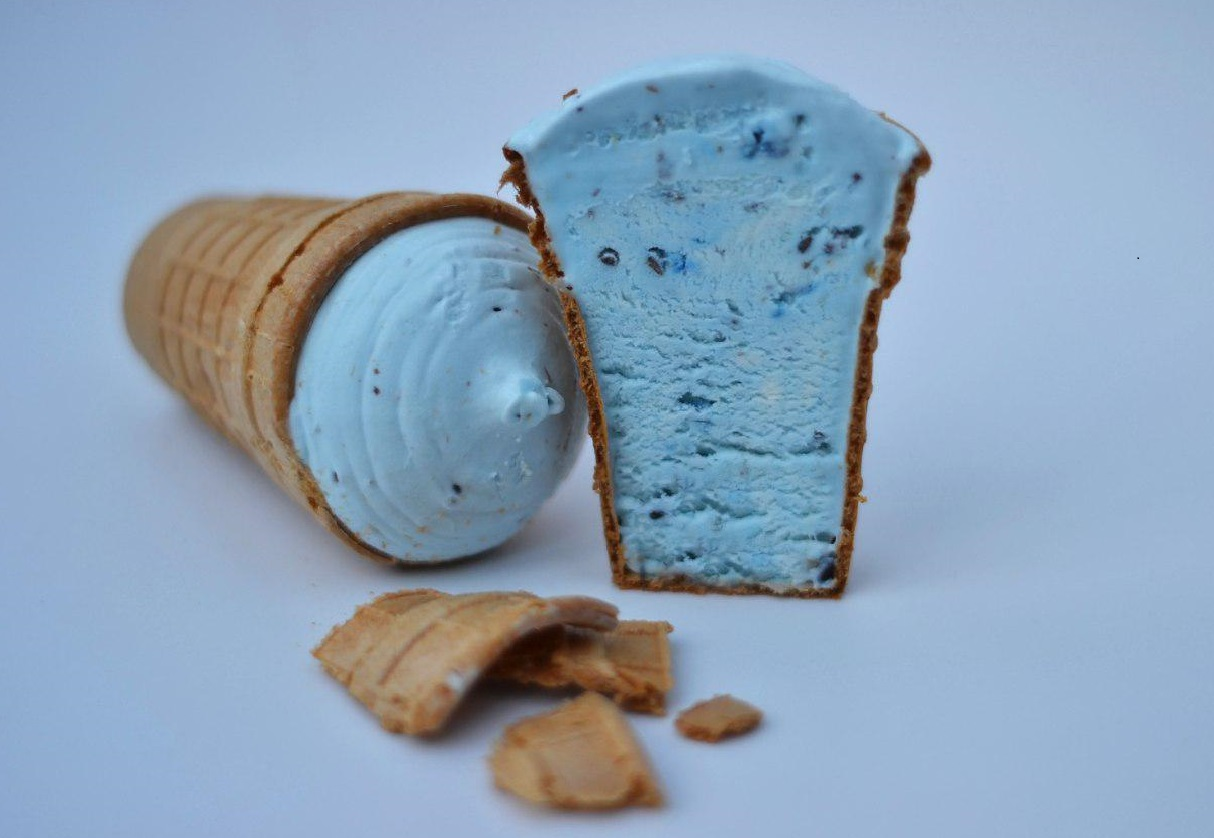
Cornflower blue ice cream

Cornflower blue is a shade of medium-to-light blue containing relatively little green. Its name is a reference to the flower Centaurea cyanus.

==== Deep sky blue ====
Deep Sky Blue

Color coordinates
- Hex triplet: #00BFFF
- sRGB^{B} (r, g, b): (0, 191, 255)
- HSV (h, s, v): (195°, 100%, 100%)
- CIELCh_{uv} (L, C, h): (73, 83, 234°)
- Source: X11
- ISCC–NBS descriptor: Brilliant greenish blue
- B: Normalized to [0–255] (byte)

Deep sky blue is an azure-cyan color associated with deep sky blue.

Deep sky blue (Capri) is a web color.

This color is on the color wheel (RGB/HSV color wheel) halfway between azure and cyan.

The traditional name for this color is Capri.

The first use of Capri as a color name in English was in 1920.

The color Capri in general is named for the azure-cyan color of the Mediterranean Sea around the island of Capri off Italy, the site of several villas belonging to the Roman Emperor Tiberius, including his imperial residence in his later years, the Villa Jovis. Specifically, the color Capri is named after the color of the Blue Grotto on the island of Capri as it appears on a bright sunny day. Today the island of Capri is a resort island popular with tourists.

The name deep sky blue for this color did not come into use until the promulgation of the X11 color list in 1987.

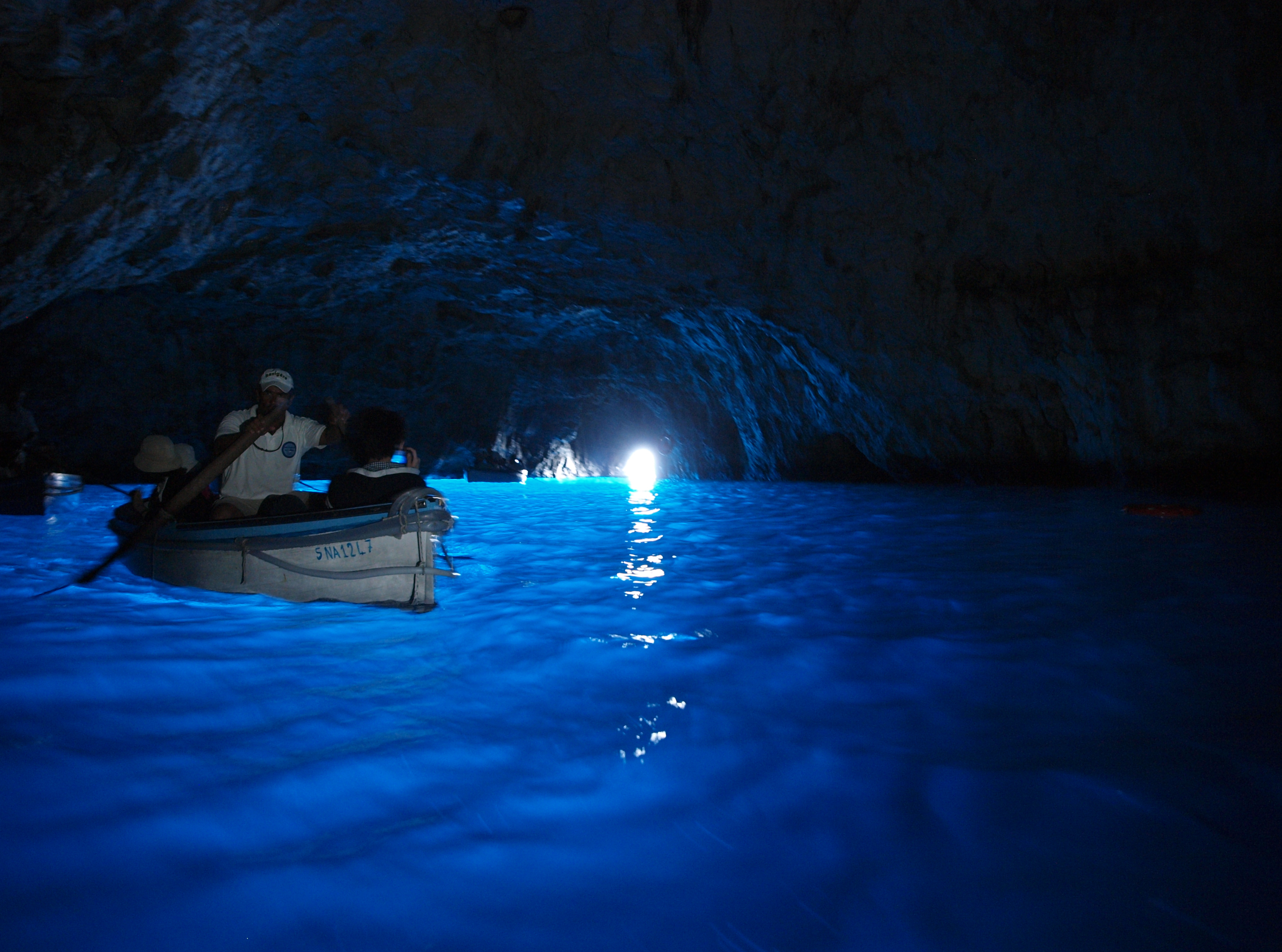
Blue Grotto waters showing their distinctive azure colour

The name Capri is still used for this color as well as the name deep sky blue. This color is used on the website Bluesky.

==== Dodger blue ====
Dodger Blue

Color coordinates
- Hex triplet: #1E90FF
- sRGB^{B} (r, g, b): (30, 144, 255)
- HSV (h, s, v): (210°, 88%, 100%)
- CIELCh_{uv} (L, C, h): (59, 107, 252°)
- Source: X11
- ISCC–NBS descriptor: Vivid blue
- B: Normalized to [0–255] (byte)

Dodger blue is a rich bright tone of azure named for its use in the uniform of the Los Angeles Dodgers.

==== French blue ====
French Blue

Color coordinates
- Hex triplet: #0072BB
- sRGB^{B} (r, g, b): (0, 114, 187)
- HSV (h, s, v): (203°, 100%, 73%)
- CIELCh_{uv} (L, C, h): (46, 75, 248°)
- Source: Maerz and Paul
- ISCC–NBS descriptor: Strong blue
- B: Normalized to [0–255] (byte)

French blue is a deep azure color commonly used in quality men's dress shirts.

According to the Oxford English Dictionary, the first use of French Blue in English was in The Times of 1802.

==== Havana blue ====
Havana Blue

Color coordinates
- Hex triplet: #A5DBE5
- sRGB^{B} (r, g, b): (165, 219, 229)
- HSV (h, s, v): (189°, 28%, 90%)
- CIELCh_{uv} (L, C, h): (84, 30, 207°)
- Source: https://icolorpalette.com/color/a5dbe5
- ISCC–NBS descriptor: Very light greenish blue
- B: Normalized to [0–255] (byte)

Havana blue is a very light tone of azure.

==== Honolulu blue ====
Honolulu Blue

Color coordinates
- Hex triplet: #0076B6
- sRGB^{B} (r, g, b): (0, 118, 182)
- HSV (h, s, v): (201°, 100%, 71%)
- CIELCh_{uv} (L, C, h): (47, 69, 244°)
- ISCC–NBS descriptor: Strong blue
- B: Normalized to [0–255] (byte)

Honolulu blue is the tone of azure used in association with the Detroit Lions football team.

==== Lapis lazuli ====
Lapis lazuli

Color coordinates
- Hex triplet: #26619C
- sRGB^{B} (r, g, b): (38, 97, 156)
- HSV (h, s, v): (210°, 76%, 61%)
- CIELCh_{uv} (L, C, h): (40, 58, 249°)
- ISCC–NBS descriptor: Moderate blue
- B: Normalized to [0–255] (byte)

Lapis lazuli is a representation of the most common color of the rock lapis lazuli.

==== Light sky blue ====
Light Sky Blue

Color coordinates
- Hex triplet: #87CEFA
- sRGB^{B} (r, g, b): (135, 206, 250)
- HSV (h, s, v): (203°, 46%, 98%)
- CIELCh_{uv} (L, C, h): (80, 55, 233°)
- Source: X11 color names
- ISCC–NBS descriptor: Brilliant greenish blue
- B: Normalized to [0–255] (byte)

There is a web color of light sky blue.

==== Manganese blue ====
Manganese Blue

Color coordinates
- Hex triplet: #1099D6
- sRGB^{B} (r, g, b): (16, 153, 214)
- HSV (h, s, v): (198°, 93%, 84%)
- CIELCh_{uv} (L, C, h): (60, 73, 238°)
- ISCC–NBS descriptor: Manganese blue
- B: Normalized to [0–255] (byte)

Manganese blue is a clear greenish azure blue colour.

==== Maya blue ====
Maya Blue

Color coordinates
- Hex triplet: #73C2FB
- sRGB^{B} (r, g, b): (115, 194, 251)
- HSV (h, s, v): (205°, 54%, 98%)
- CIELCh_{uv} (L, C, h): (76, 66, 238°)
- ISCC–NBS descriptor: Light blue
- B: Normalized to [0–255] (byte)

Maya blue was a pigment widely used by the Mayan civilization.

==== Pale azure ====
Pale azure

Color coordinates
- Hex triplet: #87D3F8
- sRGB^{B} (r, g, b): (135, 211, 248)
- HSV (h, s, v): (200°, 46%, 97%)
- CIELCh_{uv} (L, C, h): (81, 52, 228°)
- Source: X11
- ISCC–NBS descriptor: Very light greenish blue
- B: Normalized to [0–255] (byte)

==== Picton blue ====
Picton Blue

Color coordinates
- Hex triplet: #45B1E8
- sRGB^{B} (r, g, b): (69, 177, 232)
- HSV (h, s, v): (200°, 70%, 91%)
- CIELCh_{uv} (L, C, h): (68, 69, 235°)
- ISCC–NBS descriptor: Brilliant greenish blue
- B: Normalized to [0–255] (byte)

The color name Picton blue dates back to at least 2001, and came into wider use when the Resene Paints colors were used as one of the sources for the Xona Games Color List. Many of Resene's shades of blue and cyan are named after places in New Zealand's Marlborough Sounds, where the town of Picton is located.

==== Puerto Rican blue ====
Puerto Rican Blue

Color coordinates
- Hex triplet: #0044ff
- sRGB^{B} (r, g, b): (0, 68, 255)
- HSV (h, s, v): (224°, 100%, 100%)
- CIELCh_{uv} (L, C, h): (40, 134, 263°)
- ISCC–NBS descriptor: Bright blue
- B: Normalized to [0–255] (byte)

Flag of Puerto Rico

Puerto Rican blue is a bright, cool, saturated shade of blue matching the shade of color of the triangle on Puerto Rico's current national flag.

==== Royal blue (traditional) ====
Royal blue (traditional)

Color coordinates
- Hex triplet: #002366
- sRGB^{B} (r, g, b): (0, 35, 102)
- HSV (h, s, v): (219°, 100%, 40%)
- CIELCh_{uv} (L, C, h): (16, 44, 260°)
- ISCC–NBS descriptor: Deep blue
- B: Normalized to [0–255] (byte)

The traditional color called royal blue is a dark shade of azure.

==== Royal blue (web color) ====
Royal Blue (web color)

Color coordinates
- Hex triplet: #4169E1
- sRGB^{B} (r, g, b): (65, 105, 225)
- HSV (h, s, v): (225°, 71%, 88%)
- CIELCh_{uv} (L, C, h): (48, 103, 260°)
- Source: X11
- ISCC–NBS descriptor: Vivid blue
- B: Normalized to [0–255] (byte)

The web color royal blue is a rich tone of azure.

==== Silver Lake blue ====
Silver Lake Blue

Color coordinates
- Hex triplet: #5D89BA
- sRGB^{B} (r, g, b): (93, 137, 186)
- HSV (h, s, v): (212°, 50%, 73%)
- CIELCh_{uv} (L, C, h): (56, 51, 246°)
- ISCC–NBS descriptor: Moderate blue
- B: Normalized to [0–255] (byte)

The source of Silver Lake blue is the "Pantone Textile Paper eXtended (TPX)" color list, color #17-4030 TPX—Silver Lake Blue.

==== Sky blue ====
Sky Blue

Common connotations
- boys, daylight, water, air, paleness

Color coordinates
- Hex triplet: #87CEEB
- sRGB^{B} (r, g, b): (135, 206, 235)
- HSV (h, s, v): (197°, 43%, 92%)
- CIELCh_{uv} (L, C, h): (79, 46, 223°)
- Source: X11 color names
- ISCC–NBS descriptor: Very light greenish blue
- B: Normalized to [0–255] (byte)

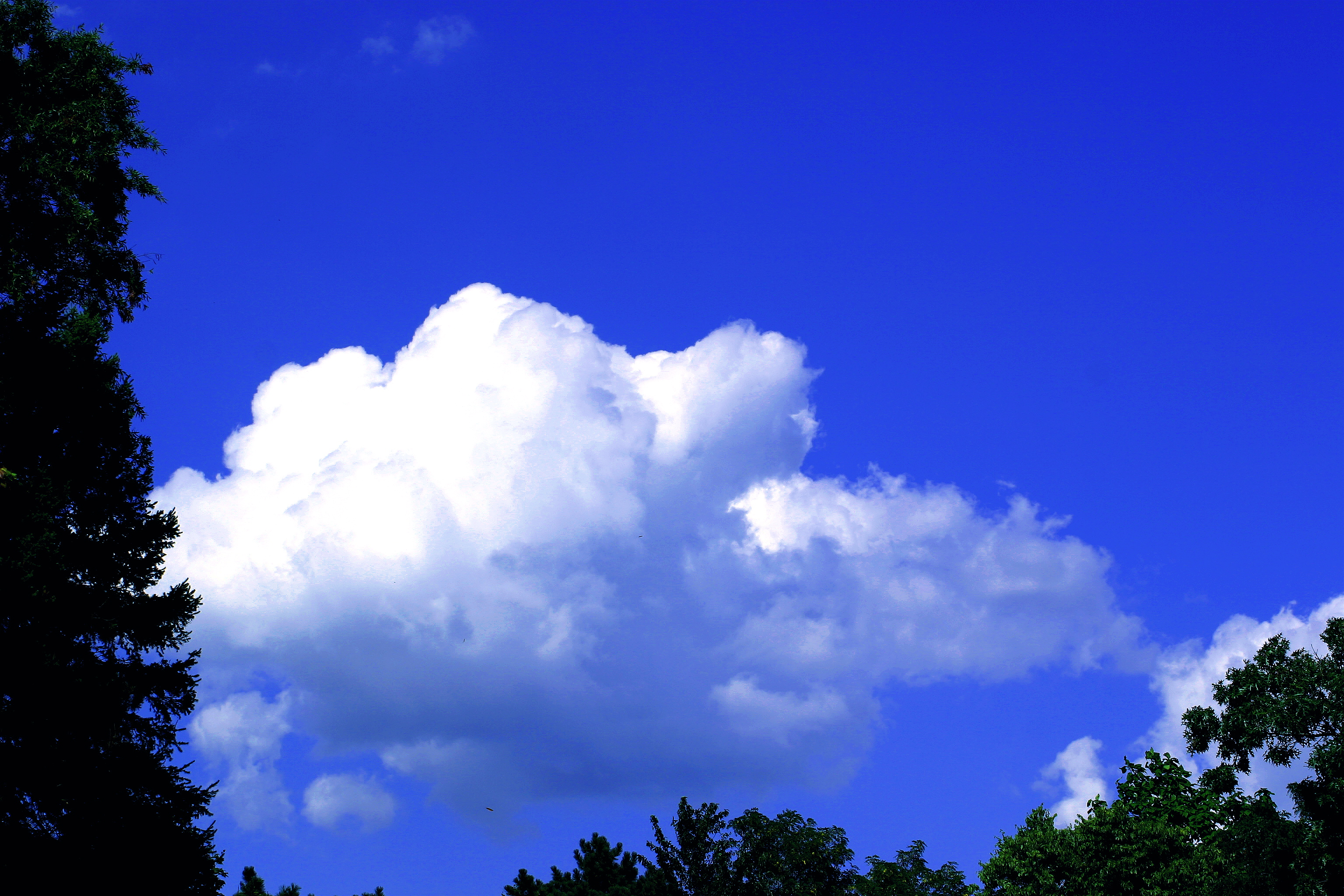
Bright blue sky with white clouds

The first recorded use of sky blue as a color name in English was in 1728 in the Cyclopædia of Ephraim Chambers. Prior to the Chambers reference, the color had first been used in 1585 in a book by Nicolas de Nicolay where he stated "the tulbant of the merchant must be skie coloured".

==== Steel blue ====
Steel Blue

Color coordinates
- Hex triplet: #4682B4
- sRGB^{B} (r, g, b): (70, 130, 180)
- HSV (h, s, v): (207°, 61%, 71%)
- CIELCh_{uv} (L, C, h): (52, 54, 243°)
- Source: X11
- ISCC–NBS descriptor: Moderate blue
- B: Normalized to [0–255] (byte)

Steel blue is a grayish tone of azure that resembles the color blue steel, i.e., steel which has been subjected to bluing in order to protect it from rust.

The first recorded use of steel blue as a color name in English was in 1817.

==== Tang blue ====
Tang Blue

Color coordinates
- Hex triplet: #0059CF
- sRGB^{B} (r, g, b): (0, 89, 207)
- HSV (h, s, v): (214°, 100%, 81%)
- CIELCh_{uv} (L, C, h): (41, 100, 258°)
- ISCC–NBS descriptor: Vivid blue
- B: Normalized to [0–255] (byte)

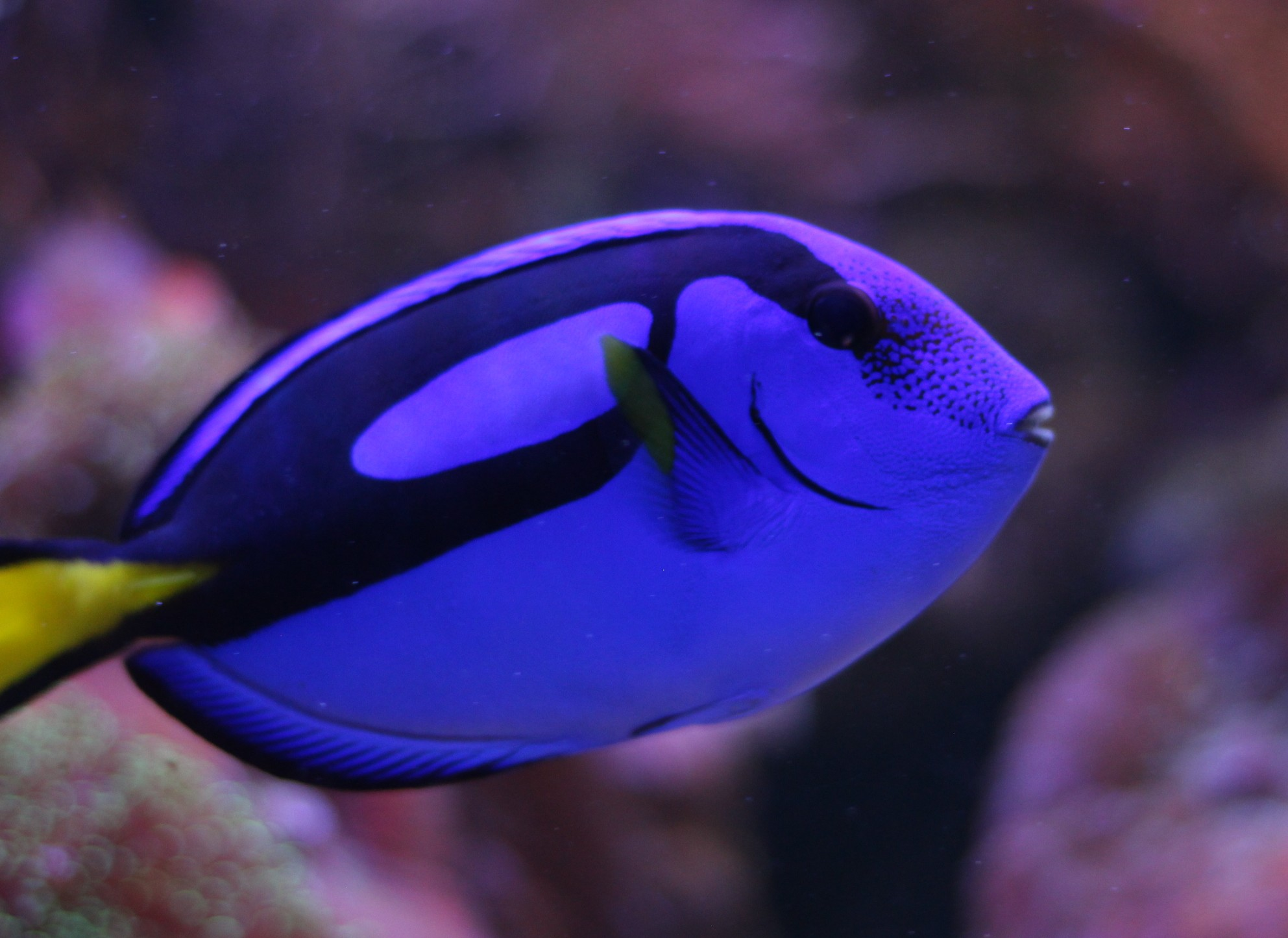
Royal blue tang

The color tang blue is a deep tone of azure that is the color of royal blue tang fish.

==== True blue ====
True Blue

Color coordinates
- Hex triplet: #2D68C4
- sRGB^{B} (r, g, b): (45, 104, 196)
- HSV (h, s, v): (217°, 77%, 77%)
- CIELCh_{uv} (L, C, h): (45, 84, 256°)
- ISCC–NBS descriptor: Vivid blue
- B: Normalized to [0–255] (byte)

The color true blue is a deep tone of azure that is the color of the uniforms of the sports teams of UCLA. It is also one of the shades of blue used by the Los Angeles Chargers though they use the name powder blue.

==== UNESCO blue ====
UNESCO blue

Color coordinates
- Hex triplet: #0069b4
- sRGB^{B} (r, g, b): (0, 105, 180)
- HSV (h, s, v): (205°, 100%, 71%)
- CIELCh_{uv} (L, C, h): (43, 74, 250°)
- ISCC–NBS descriptor: Strong blue
- B: Normalized to [0–255] (byte)

Logo of UNESCO

==== United Nations blue ====
United Nations Blue

Color coordinates
- Hex triplet: #009EDB
- sRGB^{B} (r, g, b): (0, 158, 219)
- HSV (h, s, v): (197°, 100%, 86%)
- CIELCh_{uv} (L, C, h): (61, 75, 237°)
- ISCC–NBS descriptor: Strong blue
- B: Normalized to [0–255] (byte)

Flag of the United Nations

The color United Nations blue resembles the shade of blue seen on the flag of the United Nations. Current branding guidelines (since 2020) use Pantone 2925. Previously, the flag used Pantone 279.

==== Vista blue ====
Vista Blue

Color coordinates
- Hex triplet: #7C9ED9
- sRGB^{B} (r, g, b): (124, 158, 217)
- HSV (h, s, v): (218°, 43%, 85%)
- CIELCh_{uv} (L, C, h): (65, 57, 251°)
- ISCC–NBS descriptor: Light blue
- B: Normalized to [0–255] (byte)

The source of vista blue is the "Pantone Textile Paper eXtended (TPX)" color list, color #15-3930 TPX—Vista Blue.

== See also ==
- Lists of colors
- RAL 5009 Azure blue
- Cyan
