= Endeavour Inlet =

Inlet of Queen Charlotte Sound, New Zealand

- Panaruawhiti (Māori)
- Location of Endeavour Inlet in the Marlborough Sounds
- Location: Marlborough Sounds
- Coordinates: 41°05′18″S 174°10′52″E
- Etymology: Named for HMS Endeavour
- Part of: Queen Charlotte Sound / Tōtaranui

Endeavour Inlet in Queen Charlotte Sound

Endeavour Inlet (Māori: Panaruawhiti) is a large inlet of Queen Charlotte Sound, part of New Zealand's Marlborough Sounds. It lies north-east of Bay of Many Coves / Miritū Bay and south-west of Resolution Bay. The inlet is home to a number of retreats, including Furneaux Lodge and Punga Cove.

== History ==
When James Cook visited the inlet he nailed an inscribed copper plate to a tree, bearing a date and other information. According to an old whaler named Thoms, geologist Ferdinand von Hochstetter from the Austrian Novara expedition, 1858, took the plate during a visit to the region in 1859.

At the time of James Cook's anchorage in 1770 in Queen Charlotte Sound, the inlet and other bays near the entrance of the sound were seasonally populated by groups of Māori, most likely the tribes: Ngāti Apa, Ngāti Kuia, and Rangitāne. After pākehā colonies took root, much of the bush in Endeavour Inlet was cleared and farms were established. In the early 20th century a reserve consisting of 843 acres was located on the hilly land on the west coast of the inner inlet. The majority of named owners were Rangitāne. Those who attempted to farm the land there found it difficult due to local growth causing cattle to grow ill and die, land slides and rough terrain.

In 1873 gold prospectors found ore containing 60% antimony in a landslide near the saddle between Endeavour Inlet and Port Gore. A local syndicate, including a Mr John Ashworth, formed the Marlborough Antimony Company Ltd. and began mining roughly 2km inland in the inlet in 1874, and a smelter started in 1875. The smelter failed a few years later however, and the mine was closed. Ashworth attempted unsuccessfully to resurrect the project in 1877, before in 1883 a small syndicated headed by Mr Houston Logan established the Endeavour Inlet Antimony Company. Antimony was highly priced at the time, and the syndicate succeeded in funding the project. The syndicate managed to mine the number 1 level at the saddle and two lower levels. Once again a smelter was established, but problems smelting and a fall in the price of antimony lead the syndicate to seek monetary help from England. The New Zealand Antimony Company was registered in 1888, and developed levels 4 through 7. The New Zealand Antimony Company was forced to liquidate in 1892, and a smaller New Zealand syndicate, the Star Antimony Company, took over the mine in 1892. This would prove to be the final successful mining establishment in the inlet, closing its doors in 1901. After several attempts to reestablish the mine, former mine manager Jaketh Wearne died in the mine's assay room after swallowing concentrated hydro-chloric acid in 1907. At one stage the mines were one of the largest industries in the Marlborough Region, employing over 100 men, affording a post office, school, and even an antimony mines band. Today the remains of the treatment works and smelter can still be seen, along with a waste rock pile and a few drives.

In 1903 early New Zealand conservationist and owner of The Wellington Biscuit and Confectionery Company on Farish St, Wellington Patrick Grieve Howden bought one thousand acres of forest in the back Eastern arm of the inlet, and built a holiday home there. His son, Captain Harry Howden R.N., took over the property after his father's death in 1914 and in 1937 converted it to a private scenic reserve, before bequeathing it to the country as a scenic reserve and bird sanctuary in 1961. The Howden homestead is now part of Furneaux Lodge.

== Naming ==
Panaruawhiti can be split into three Māori syllables, pana meaning 'to cause to come forth', rua meaning 'pit' or 'hole', and whiti meaning 'shining'. Alexander Wyclif Reed and Peter Dowling suggest the name is a reference to the emerging of the sun. Furneaux Lodge gives the translations of 'cross over in pairs', and 'twilight'.

Endeavour Inlet is named for James Cook's ship HMS Endeavour. Cook originally labelled the inlet West Bay due to its directional entrance, but the name was changed to Endeavour Inlet by Captain John Lort Stokes of HMS Acheron.

== Local places ==
=== Baker's Bay ===
Baker's Bay is near the southern end of Endeavour Inlet. Baker's Bay is named for the Baker family, former residents of the bay. The bay is privately owned under freehold, and its name is unofficial.

=== Big Bay ===
Big Bay is a bay located near the back of the Western arm of Endeavour Inlet. In the early 20th century 949 acres of land were allocated to 28 people, largely Rangitāne. One of the owners sold her interests in 1912, while the rest of the land was leased for farming. Farming efforts proved difficult, and in 1953 the Lands and Survey Department reported the cleared areas had been retaken by growth. The crown purchased a section in 1957 consisting of 161 acres, and a second in 1973. Both of these sections were added to the adjacent scenic reserve, while the remaining land remained in Māori ownership. The name of the bay is a reference to its size, and it is one of the largest bays in Endeavour Inlet.

=== Camp Bay ===
Camp Bay is located in the Western arm of Endeavour Inlet, just south of Big Bay. The bay is home to a campsite, likely the origin of its name.

=== Deep Bay ===
Deep Bay is near the southern end of Endeavour Inlet.

Deep Bay is most likely a reference to the water depth in the bay. A sunken reef sits off the point between Deep Bay and Pukekoikoi, however Deep Bay itself remains quite deep until close to shore.

=== Eatwell's Lookout ===
Eatwell's Lookout is located on Pukekoikoi hill. Local land owners Rod and Kath Eatwell played a crucial role in the creation of the Queen Charlotte Track in the 1980s, opting in to the project and doing much of the heavy lifting alongside their children and grandchildren. Other land owners were inspired by the Eatwells' efforts and joined in. Despite a lack of funding in 1985, Eatwell & co. continued to clear the tracks of gorse. In 1991 Rod Eatwell attended the official opening of the Queen Charlotte Track and cut the cake. The Lookout is named for the Eatwells, and features a number of signs made by Rod himself.

=== Edgecombe Point ===
Edgecombe Point marks the entrance to Endeavour Inlet, along with Scott Point. The point was named in honour of John Edgecombe, the Sergeant of Marines on the Endeavour. Naming locations in Endeavour Inlet after Cook's crew is common.

A reserve consisting of two separate blocks (Mint Bay to Bakers Bay and Deep Bay) took its name from the point. 520 acres of land were allocated to 14 people, largely of Ngāti Kuia affiliation.

=== Marine Head ===
Marine Head is located south of Tawa Bay and was likely named for the marines on board Cook's ships.

=== Mount Furneaux ===
Mount Furneaux is an 823-metre (2,700 ft) peak located between Meretoto / Ship Cove and Endeavour Inlet.

Mount Furneaux was named for Captain Tobias Furneaux, an English navigator who accompanied Cook on his 2nd voyage to the Pacific aboard HMS Adventure. Furneaux Lodge, located at the base of the mountain, is named for it.

The Māori name for the mountain, Puhikererū, can be split into two Māori words, puhi meaning 'plume', and kererū (Hemiphaga novaeseelandiae). Together puhikererū means 'the plume of the kererū' or 'decorated with feathers'. According to legend, Kupe brought two birds with him to New Zealand. A kererū named Rupe and a cormorant or shag named Kawauatoru. Kupe sent Rupe to learn what fruits filled the forests. Rupe flew south and landed upon Puhikererū, joining other local kererū feasting there. Rupe would never return to Kupe, and the mountain was dubbed Puhikererū. The mountain is tapu to the local tribes, Te Ātiawa, Rangitāne, Ngāti Kuia, and Ngāti Apa, symbolising life force within the natural world, the binding force between the spiritual and physical realms. The mountain was also used to aid in navigation.

=== Pukekoikoi ===
Pukekoikoi is a hill and the adopted name of a bay between Deep Bay and Bakers Bay. A sunken reef sits off the point between Deep Bay and Pukekoikoi.

Pukekoikoi can be split into two Māori words, puke meaning 'hill', and koikoi meaning 'somewhat sharp'. Together pukekoikoi means 'the sharpened hill'.

=== Punga Cove ===
Punga Cove sits alongside Camp Bay to its south-east. Punga is a Māori word meaning 'anchor'. The cove is home to a retreat owned by Marlborough Tour Company.

=== Scott Point ===
Scott Point sits on the eastern tip of Endeavour Inlet Bay. The point was dubbed Scott Point by Captain Tobias Furneaux, after James Scott. Scott was the Lieutenant of Marines aboard HMS Adventure during James Cook's second voyage.

=== Tawa Bay ===
Tawa Bay is located on the eastern coast of Endeavour Inlet. The bay's name is derived from the common name for Beilschmiedia tawa, a broadleaf tree common through the Marlborough Sounds.
