= Resolution Bay =

Locality in New Zealand

Atapu / Resolution Bay
- Location within Marlborough Sounds
- Location: Marlborough Sounds
- Coordinates: 41°07′31″S 174°13′32″E
- Etymology: Named for HMS Resolution

Resolution Bay in Queen Charlotte Sound

Resolution Bay (Māori: Atapu) is a large bay in the outer stretch of Queen Charlotte Sound, north east of Endeavour Inlet, which it meets at Scott Point.

== History ==
There was likely Māori settlement in the bay prior to the 1850s. Midden sites have shown a large amount of bone, argillite and shellfish remains, though this could also indicate a popular Māori gathering or lunch spot.

Resolution Bay was part of the Waitohi Purchase in 1850, along with Picton. No Māori reserves were set up at the time, and the majority of the land was taken over by farmers. William Woodgate is said to have been the first to find stibnite in the bay, and mining it for antimony became a thriving local industry in the neighbouring Endeavour Inlet. A timber mill, several farms, and an on and off aided school operated in the bay over the years. Family names such as Turner, Ewing, Vipond, Adams, Pullman, McManaway and Annear are found throughout the bays history. According to the McManaways, the Murchison earthquake had dramatic effects, reporting it felt as if the hills were going to come down. The farms produced a large amount of butter, which was exported to Picton in such quantities as 130 pounds (59 kg) a week. Eventually a holiday camp was established, owned and operated by Douglas and Libby Brown from the 1960s after leaving an architecture business in Wellington. Today the majority of the land has gone back to the Crown, and the Resolution Bay Lodge is a notable coffee stop along the Queen Charlotte Track.

G. C. Hayter reports the bay just within Scott Point was once home to a fisherman who "developed the unpleasant habit" of killing his children. Hayter reports the man eventually fell to his death in Picton gaol.

== Naming ==
Atapu is a name of some debate. It has been suggested it should be spelt Ātapu, Otapu meaning "a sacred place", or Atapo meaning "early dawn". Alexander Wyclif Reed calls it futile to speculate the name's meaning, as both ata and pu have a plethora of meanings.

Resolution Bay is a reference to James Cook's ship HMS Resolution which he brought on his second and third voyages. The bay was likely dubbed such by Captain John Lort Stokes in the early 1850s. Cook initially dubbed the bay Shag Cove during his first expedition, a name seconded on Peter Fannin's map from his second voyage, aboard HMS Adventure.

== Localities ==
=== Bottle Rock ===
Bottle Rock sits east of Resolution Bay, just south of the bay's eastern tip. Beneath the waves, Bottle Rock connects to the point.

The rock's Māori name, Akatārewa, means "hanging vines" or "trailing vines".

Bottle Rock is an unofficial name. The peninsula adjacent to it has been dubbed "Bottle Rock Peninsula" and was home to a ZIP (Zero Invasive Predators) research facility as of March 2020.

=== Schoolhouse Bay ===
Schoolhouse Bay sits at the back of Resolution Bay. The bay was formerly home to the local school, which operated on and off, and had twelve pupils in the 1920s from families in Endeavour Inlet and Resolution Bay. The school building was eventually washed away by a slip. Parts of the Queen Charlotte Track were once bridle paths used by children to ride ponies to the school.

=== Whātapu ===
Whātapu can be split into two Māori words. Firstly, whā, meaning "harakeke leaf", and tapu, meaning "sacred". Together whātapu means "sacred harakeke leaves". The Atapu name may have been derived from this point.
