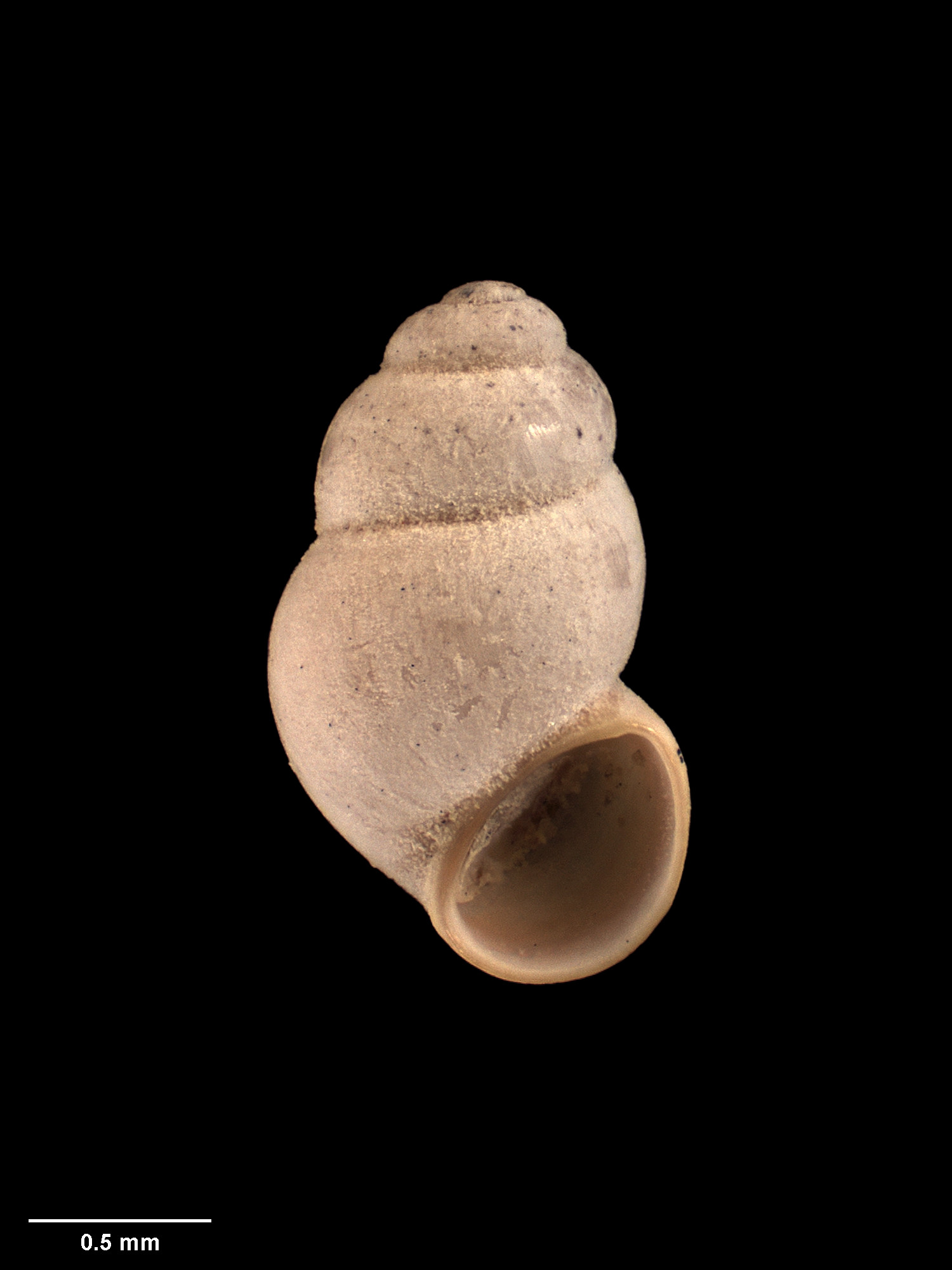

Conservation status
- Nationally Critical (NZ TCS)

Scientific classification
- Kingdom: Animalia
- Phylum: Mollusca
- Class: Gastropoda
- Subclass: Caenogastropoda
- Order: Littorinimorpha
- Family: Tateidae
- Genus: Hadopyrgus
- Species: H. rawhiti

Binomial name
- Hadopyrgus rawhiti Martin Haase, 2008

Synonyms
- Hydrobiidae sp. 34 (M.174193)

= Hadopyrgus rawhiti =

Species of gastropod

Hadopyrgus rawhiti is a critically endangered species of freshwater snail native to New Zealand.

== Habitat ==
This snail has been found in only one location: a seepage by a waterfall in a stream between Hopewell & Raetihi, behind Double Bay, Kenepuru Sound. The population trend of this snail is currently unknown, but it is considered potentially threatened by habitat destruction.

== Conservation status ==
In November 2018 the Department of Conservation classified Hadopyrgus rawhiti as Nationally Critical under the New Zealand Threat Classification System. The species was judged as meeting the criteria for Nationally Critical threat status as a result of it only being found in one location which was less than 1 ha in size.
