= Bottle Rock =

Island in New Zealand

Geography
- Coordinates: 41.126918°S 174.242275°E

Administration
- New Zealand
- Region: Marlborough

Demographics
- Population: uninhabited

Bottle Rock is a small island in Marlborough, New Zealand. It is part of the Queen Charlotte Sound / Tōtaranui, and on the edge of Resolution Bay.

The land surrounding Bottle Rock is known as the Bottle Rock peninsula, which has been the site of the removal of pests such as rats, possums, and stoats. Unconventionally, fences were not used to keep the pests out. Instead, they created various lines of traps and called this a 'virtual barrier'. Electronic beacons are also used to detect when a trap has been activated. Wasps have also been reduced using stations of protein bait that contain insecticide. This bait does not attract bees.

== See also ==
- List of islands of New Zealand
