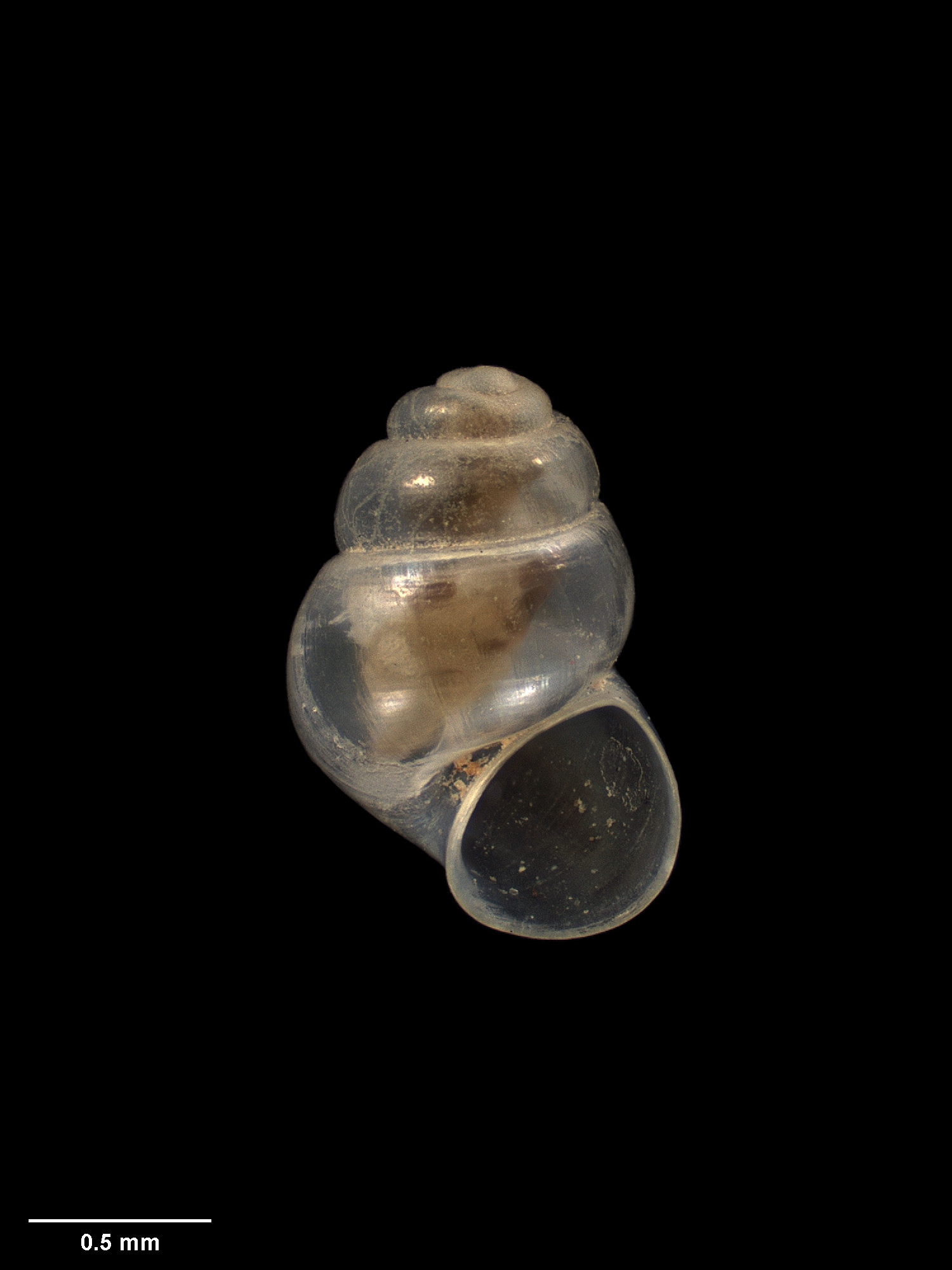

Conservation status
- Nationally Critical (NZ TCS)

Scientific classification
- Kingdom: Animalia
- Phylum: Mollusca
- Class: Gastropoda
- Subclass: Caenogastropoda
- Order: Littorinimorpha
- Family: Tateidae
- Genus: Hadopyrgus
- Species: H. ngataana

Binomial name
- Hadopyrgus ngataana Haase, 2008

Synonyms
- Hydrobiidae sp. 33 (M.174154)

= Hadopyrgus ngataana =

Species of gastropod

Hadopyrgus ngataana is a tiny, transparent, and critically endangered freshwater snail, found only in a single stream in a cave in New Zealand.

== Habitat ==
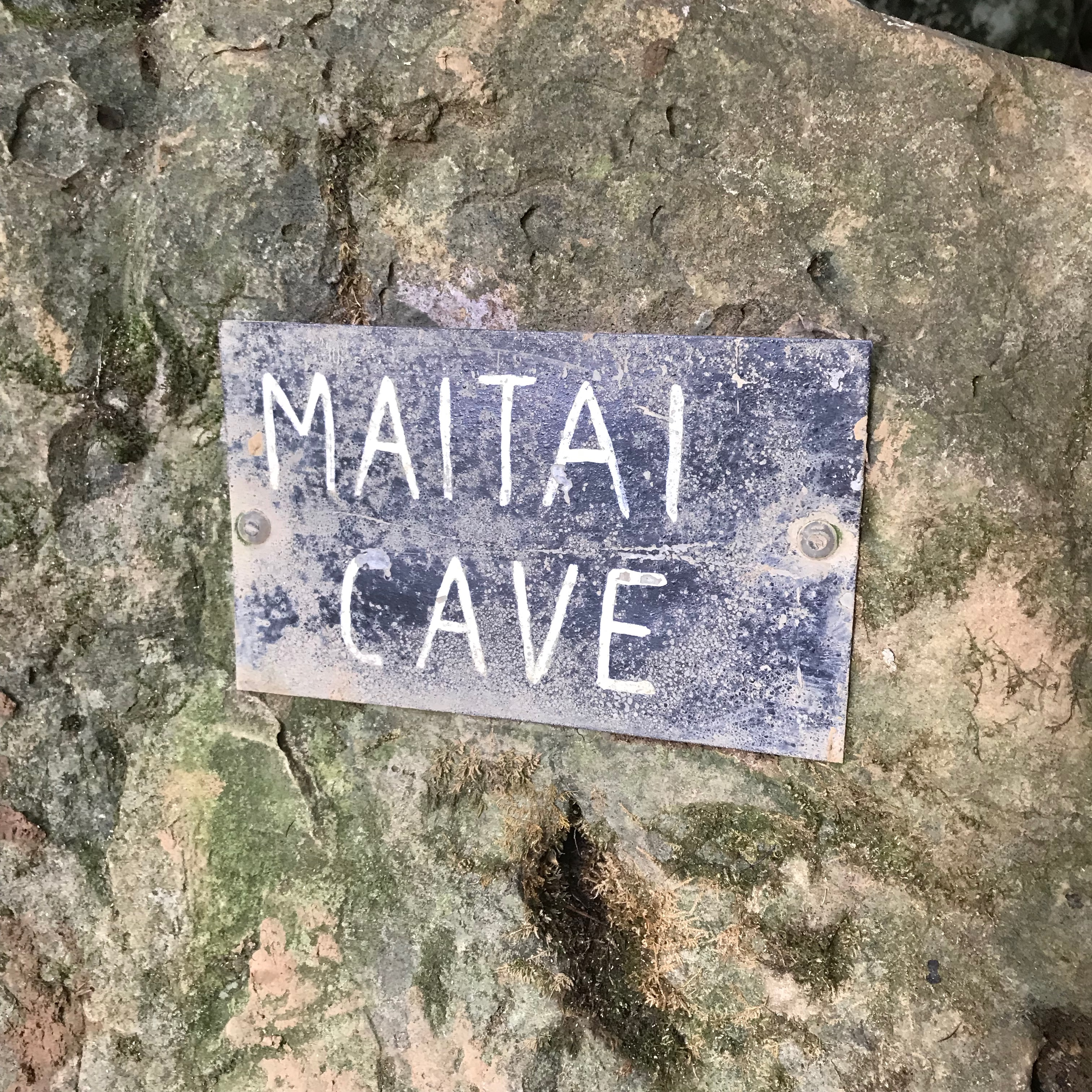
Maitai Cave

This snail has only been found in one spot: in one pool, in a stream at the entrance of Maitai Cave, in the Maitai River Valley southeast of Nelson. It is one of a group of very small, blind, transparent freshwater snails found in caves or underground streams, especially in Northwest Nelson, and like many of these species has evolved in just one small area.

== Taxonomy ==
The tiny (1.7 x 1.2 mm) snail was discovered by Frank Climo in the 1970s, but was considered to be just one form of another subterranean Hadopyrgus snail found in the Nelson area. In 2001 Martin Haase and Christina Mosimann collected more specimens from Maitai Cave by washing and sieving gravel, and using both morphological and genetic evidence realised these belonged to a distinct species. They scientifically described and named it Hadopyrgus ngataana in 2008; the name they chose, ngataana, comes from the Māori words ngata (snail or slug) and ana (cave).

== Conservation status ==
In November 2018 the Department of Conservation classified H. ngataana as Nationally Critical, using the New Zealand Threat Classification System. The species meets the Nationally Critical criteria because it is found in just one location, and occupies a total area of less than 1 hectare. Because Maitai Cave is a popular recreational area, and the stream the species has evolved in is so small, the population of this critically endangered snail is expected to decline.

While it is possible for freshwater invertebrates to be legally protected under the Wildlife Amendment Act 1980, neither H. ngataana nor any other New Zealand freshwater invertebrate has been protected.
