= Hadopyrgus =

Scientific classification
- Kingdom: Animalia
- Phylum: Mollusca
- Class: Gastropoda
- Subclass: Caenogastropoda
- Order: Littorinimorpha
- Family: Tateidae
- Genus: Hadopyrgus; Climo, 1974

Type species
- Hadopyrgus anops Climo, 1974

Species
- See text

Genus of gastropods

Hadopyrgus is a genus of white or transparent freshwater snails found only in New Zealand. They are micromolluscs, just a few millimetres long, in the gastropod family Tateidae. Hadopyrgus species are subterranean – living in caves, underground aquifers, or deep in river gravels – and so were named from the Greek hades (underworld) and pyrgos (tower). They can have quite restricted ranges: Hadopyrgus ngataana, for example, has been found in just one pool, in a stream flowing through a single cave.

== Species ==
Species within the genus Hadopyrgus include:

- Hadopyrgus anops Climo, 1974
- Hadopyrgus brevis Climo, 1974
- Hadopyrgus dubius Haase, 2008
- Hadopyrgus expositus Haase, 2008
- Hadopyrgus ngataana Haase, 2008
- Hadopyrgus rawhiti Haase, 2008
- Hadopyrgus sororius Haase, 2008
