= Kenepuru Sound =

Body of water in New Zealand

Coordinates: 41.183°S 174.016°E

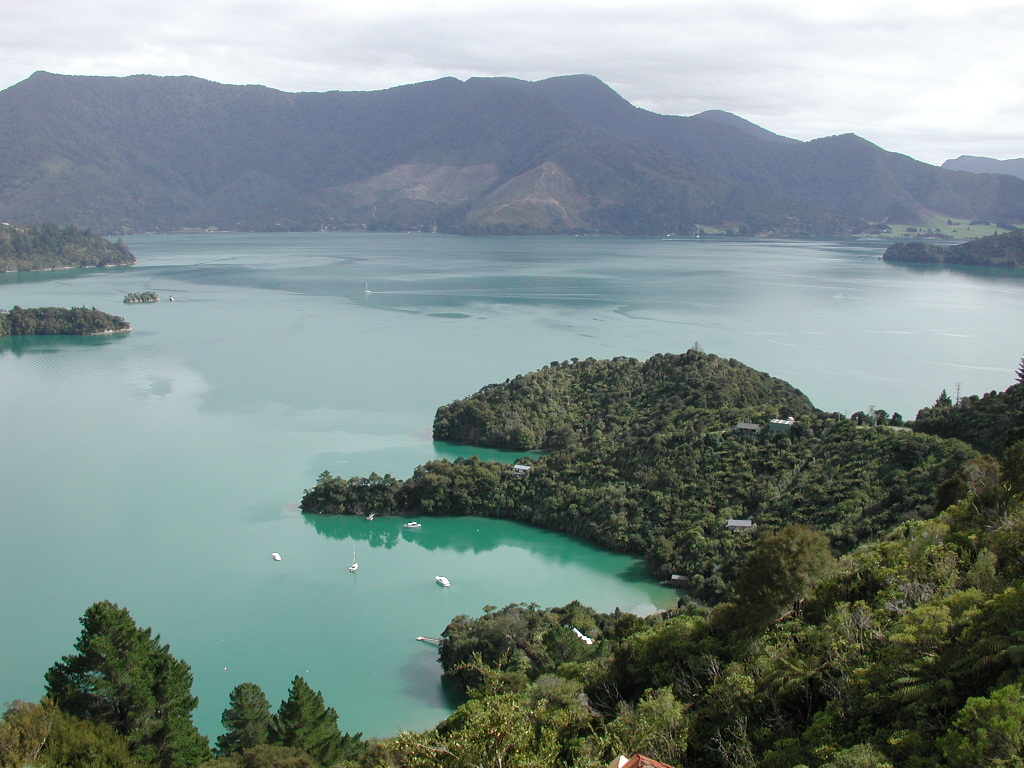
Kenepuru Sound from Queen Charlotte Track

Kenepuru Sound is one of the larger of the Marlborough Sounds in the South Island of New Zealand. The drowned valley is an arm of Pelorus Sound / Te Hoiere, it runs for 25 kilometres (16 mi) from the northeast to southwest, joining Pelorus Sound a quarter of the way down the latter's path to the Cook Strait.

Queen Charlotte Sound, the largest sound in Marlborough, lies to the southeast, parallel to Kenepuru Sound. Some of the small side arms of the two sounds are only hundreds of metres apart, at Te Mahia Bay and Portage Bay, but are separated by a steep serrated range of hills. Not surprisingly, one of the settlements on this stretch of coast is called Portage, named for the simplest method of passing between the two sounds. Queen Charlotte Track runs along the ridge of hills between Kenepuru Sound and Queen Charlotte Sound.

Early road development linking Picton with Kenepuru contributed to Kenepuru Sound being used as a holiday destination. Resorts and holiday houses are dotted along the coast and at Te Mahia Bay and Portage Bay. A sealed, but windy, narrow road leads along the southern shore of Kenepuru Sound all the way to Kenepuru Head. From there, unsealed roads continue further and along the less populated northern shore.
