= Resene =

New Zealand and Australian paint store chain

Resene Paints LTD
- Resene logo around May 2026

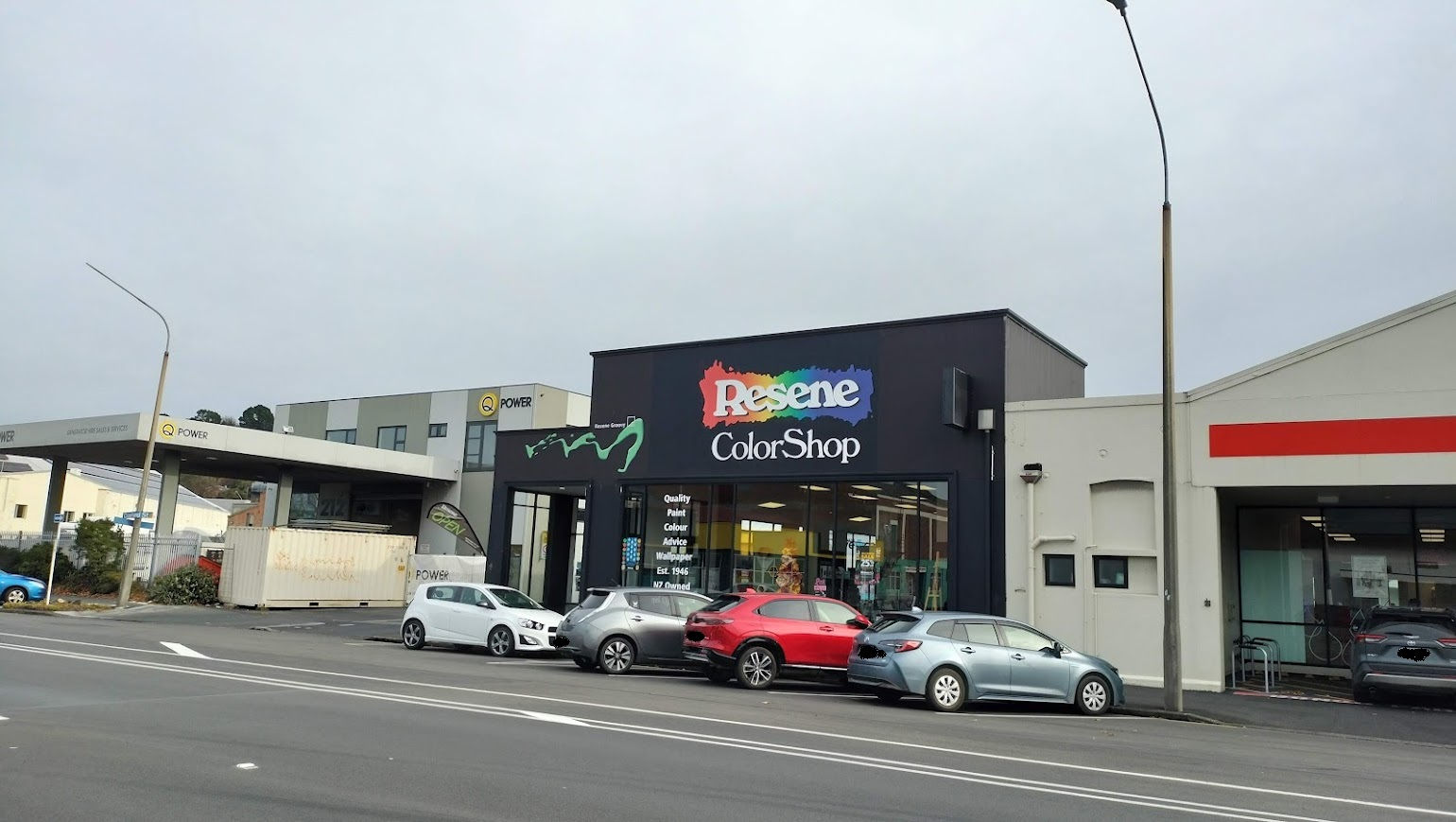
- Resene Color Shop in Dunedin
- Type: Paint manufacturers
- Founded: 1946 in Wellington, New Zealand
- Founder: Ted Nightingale
- Headquarters: Wellington, New Zealand, Molendinar, Queensland Australia
- Area served: New Zealand, Australia, Fiji
- Products: Resene Lumbersider, Resene Lustacryl, Resene Quick Dry, Resene SpaceCote Low Sheen, Resene Zylone Sheen
- Owner: Nick Nightingale
- Website: resene.co.nz resene.com.au

Resene Paints LTD is a New Zealand paint and building materials manufacturer and retailer.

== Divisions ==
=== Resene Paints LTD & Resene Paints Australia LTD ===
Resene produces paint for New Zealand & Australian conditions from manufacturing facilities in Naenae and Upper Hutt, and sells them through its own retail stores and other retailers in both New Zealand and Australia. It also manufactures paint and paint technology for international markets.

Resene's major products have been adapted to keep up with changing tastes. In the 1950s, this was pastel colours. In the 1960s, it was bold psychedelic colours like sharp orange, intense teal, banana yellow, cyan blue and red. In the 1970s, earthy colours like brown and mustard were popular. During the 1980s, "nurturing" colours like apricot, nude pink and pale grey were in vogue. The 1990s were a time of minimalism and neutral colours, like black, white, green, aqua and nautical blues. In the 2000s, shades of grey, botanic green, silver and taupe were in favour.

White and neutral colours were the most popular during the 2010s and 2020s. Decorators were using bright colours, pastels and dark cocooning colours in certain areas, based on personal tastes.

=== Resene ColorShop ===
Resene ColorShop is a chain of retail stores selling paint and other home improvement products. Its first store opened in Wellington CBD in 1975 and it now has 60 stores around the country including 20 in Auckland. The store is deliberately spelt with the American English spelling of color to be unique.

The chain won the painting and home decorating category of the Reader's Digest customer service awards in 2021, coming ahead of its rival Guthrie Bowron.

=== Habitat by Resene ===
Resene has its own home improvement magazine, Habitat by Resene, covering homes, do-it-yourself tips, paint advice and related news.

=== Resene Automotive & Light Industrial ===
Resene Automotive & Light Industrial is a specialist automotive paints manufacturer, producing products for cars, trucks, buses, planes, boats, diggers and machinery, and specialist waterborne light industrial products for machinery and furniture. The paints are designed for the increased UV exposure, wind and salt spray and changeable weather conditions New Zealand experiences.

The company also supplies products like fillers and bog, solvents, sandpaper, primers and topcoats and spray painting equipment. It has a nationwide network of commercial vehicle repair and respray for commercial vehicle fleet operators.

The company began as Anglo Santano in 1980, founded by a small group of entrepreneurs that spotted a gap in the market. It grew rapidly and was purchased by Resene in 1995.

=== Resene Coating Technologies Group ===
Resene Coating Technologies Group is Resene's research and development arm, which develops new emerging technologies into commercially available products for Resene and other businesses, for local and international markets.

One of its innovations, the Resene SmartTouch conductive coating, is used as a basecoat under regular Resene topcoats and can be tapped to turn lights on and off, reducing the need to fumble in the dark for a light switch.

Another innovation, Resene Total Colour System tinting technology, allows for an infinite array of colours to be tinted using combinations of existing colourants.

=== Resene Construction Systems ===
Resene Construction Systems is Resene's construction supplies arm. It design, manufactures and distributes a range of plaster façade, lightweight concrete systems and coatings for New Zealand and Pacific markets, including Resene's trademark ROCKCOTE and Plaster Systems brands.

=== Altex Coatings ===
Altex Coatings is one of the largest manufacturers of industrial and marine protective coatings in Australasia, supply coating types and systems for most major industries. Its coating products include corrosion protection, fireproofing, flooring and marine coating.

The company was established in 1954.

== History ==
=== 1946-1972 ===
Eastbourne builder Ted Nightingale established Resene from his garage in 1946, after being unable to find an alkali-resistant paint to protect his concrete buildings. He developed his own cement-based Striplecoat product using an old cement mixer in his garage. He began commercial production in a factory space in Tinakori Road to meet strong demand from local builders.

Nightingale began producing its first waterborne paint in Australasia in 1951. He gave it the brand name Resene in reference to resin, the main ingredient in Nightingale's paints. The product was initially unpopular as people feared it would wash off.

The company was formally registered in 1952, initially under the Stipplecote Products after the flagship product.

Resene expanded rapidly during the 1950s and introduced a line of solventborne products. The company produced some new colours and technologies, and developed coloured paintbases.

The company moved manufacturing from Kaiwharawhara to Seaview, Lower Hutt in 1967.

An office was established in Fiji in 1965 to sell Resene Paints to Pacific Island countries.

Resene established its own warehouses in 1970, bypassing third-party salespeople and hiring its own salespeople to sell directly to tradespeople around the country.

=== 1972-1999 ===
Ted Nightingale's son Tony took over the company operations in 1972.

Tony Nightingale purchased a wallpaper store in 1975, converting it into the company's first retail store.

The company officially changed its name to Resene in 1977, reflecting how its Resene waterborne paints were its staple product.

Resene introduced a full range of test pots in 1981, and introduced its flagship Total Colour Multi-Finish System in 1985.

The company opened an office in Australia in 1990 to sell to Australian and international markets.

It moved manufacturing from Seaview, Lower Hutt, to its current site in Naenae, Lower Hutt, in 1992.

A virtual technology software was introduced in 1999, which uses Adobe Flash to allow customers to test how different colours would look in their home or building. The software began to be redeveloped when Flash was phased out between 2017 and 2020.

=== 1999-present ===
Tony Nightingale' son Nick Nightingale was appointed General Manager in 1999, and becoming Managing Director a few years later.

Resene reviewed all areas of its business in 2010, following two years of reduced revenues and profit margins during the Great Recession. The company said it was left in a "tight and tenuous position", being effected by high fixed costs, fluctuations in the exchange rate for the New Zealand dollar and the rising price of raw materials.

In 2015, Nick Nightingale said the company was continuing to develop new products, including "new bases, new tints".
