= Clif Reed =

New Zealand publisher and author

- Born: Alexander Wyclif Reed; 7 March 1908; Ponsonby, Auckland, New Zealand
- Died: 19 October 1979 (aged 71); Wellington, New Zealand
- Other names: A.W. Reed
- Occupations: Publisher and author
- Known for: Publisher: Reed Publishing Māori and Aboriginal cultures

Alexander Wyclif Reed (7 March 1908 – 19 October 1979), also known as Clif Reed and A. W. Reed, was a prolific New Zealand publisher and author.

== Biography ==
Alexander Wyclif Reed, along with his uncle Alfred Hamish Reed, established the publishing firm A. H. & A. W. Reed. He wrote more than 200 books and as an author was known most commonly as A. W. Reed. He was neither a scholar nor a gifted writer, but wrote commercially successful books based on simplifying and popularising secondary sources. Although he did not have firsthand knowledge of Māori language or custom, he wrote many books on the myths, language and place names of the Māori and, later, of Australian Aboriginal cultures.

== Selected published works ==
- Reed, A. W. (1951). Reed's Bible Story Atlas. A.H. & A.W. Reed.
- Reed, A. W. (1966). Books are My Business : The Life of a Publisher. Reading: Educational Explorers.
- Reed, A. W. (1967). Aboriginal Place Names and Their Meanings. A.H. & A.W. Reed. ISBN 978-0-589-07002-1.
- Reed, A. W. (1969). Place-names of New South Wales, Their Origins and Meanings. Reed Publishing.
- Reed, A. W. (1973). Place Names of Australia. Reed. ISBN 978-0-589-07115-8.
- Reed, A. W. (1975). Place Names of New Zealand. A.H. & A.W. Reed. ISBN 0-589-00933-8.
- Reed, A. W.; Brougham, Aileen E. (1978). The Concise Maori Handbook. A. H. & A. W. Reed. ISBN 978-0-589-01111-6.
- Reed, A. W. (1993). Aboriginal Myths, Legends and Fables. Reed Books. ISBN 978-0-7301-0424-7.
- Reed, A. W. (1996). The Reed Dictionary of Māori Place Names = Te Papakupu Ingoa Wāhi Māori a Reed (3rd ed.). Reed. ISBN 978-0-7900-0494-5.
- Brougham, Aileen E.; Reed, A. W.; Kāretu, T. S. (1999). The Reed Book of Māori Proverbs = Te Kohikohinga Whakataukī a Reed (3rd rev. ed.). Reed Books. ISBN 978-0-7900-0638-3.
- Reed, A. W.; Calman, Ross (2004). Reed Book of Māori Mythology (New & fully rev. ed.). Reed Books. ISBN 978-0-7900-0950-6.
