= Queen Charlotte Track =

Walking and biking track in New Zealand

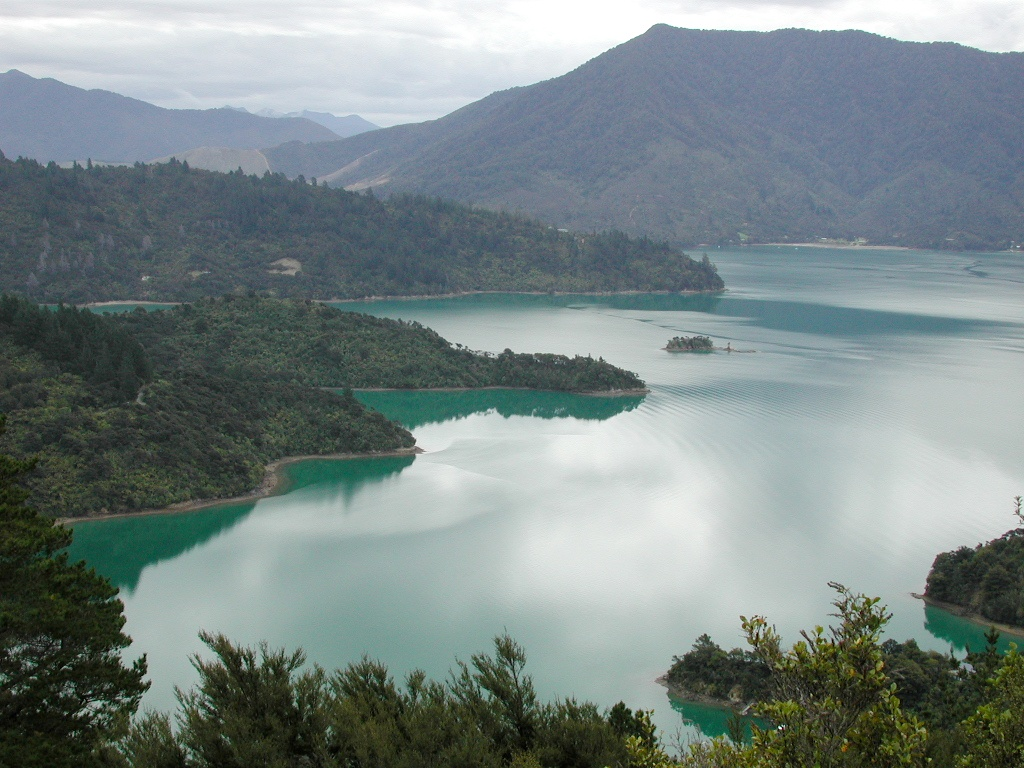
- Te Mahia Bay, a typical view from Queen Charlotte Track
- Length: 71 km (44 mi)
- Location: Marlborough Sounds, New Zealand
- Designation: Walking Track and "Great Rides" Cycle Trail
- Trailheads: Ship Cove, Anakiwa
- Use: Tramping, cycling
- Highest point: Ridgeline near Bay of Many Coves 470 m (1,540 ft)
- Lowest point: 0 m (0 ft)
- Difficulty: Easy (walking), Grade 3–4 (mountain biking)
- Season: All year
- Sights: Sounds, sandy beaches, lush coastal native bush
- Hazards: None
- Surface: Dirt
- Website: www.doc.govt.nz/parks-and-recreation/places-to-go/marlborough/places/queen-charlotte-sound-totaranui-area/things-to-do/tracks/queen-charlotte-track/ and www.qctrack.co.nz

The Queen Charlotte Track is a 71 km (44 mi) long New Zealand walking track between Queen Charlotte Sound and Kenepuru Sound in the Marlborough Sounds. It extends from Meretoto / Ship Cove in the north to Anakiwa in the south. For most parts, the track leads through native bush along the ridgeline of hills between the sounds, offering good views either side.

Since early 2013, the Queen Charlotte Track also has become one of the New Zealand Cycle Trails, accessible for mountain bike-level riders.

== Description ==
The track is maintained by the New Zealand Department of Conservation (DOC) and is well formed and easy to follow. It is one of the most popular tramping tracks in New Zealand, and is also open to mountain biking all year round except for the section from Meretoto / Ship Cove to Kenepuru Saddle, which is closed for mountain biking from December to February.

The walking track leads over mainly clay soil, with bridges over all major streams, and reaches from sea level to 470m high. It is not a difficult track, however, it is a long track, with the section between Camp Bay and Torea Saddle over 23 km long. The entire one-way trip can be completed in 3–5 days by foot, or 13 hours by bike (typically split over two days). Queen Charlotte Track is also popular for day walks, with boat transfer access at Meretoto / Ship Cove, Resolution Bay, Panaruawhiti / Endeavour Inlet, Camp Bay, Tōrea Moua / Tōrea Bay, Mistletoe Bay, and Anakiwa. Boat transport is available from and to Picton. Road access was previously possible until August 2022 storms damaged the road with access points at Camp Bay, Torea Saddle, Te Mahia Saddle, and Anakiwa.

Queen Charlotte Track passes several Department of Conservation campsites, as well as private accommodations, as it crosses private land on some sections. Side tracks lead to Miritū Bay / Bay of Many Coves and Lochmara Bay. Adults walking or biking the track require a Queen Charlotte Track Land Cooperative (Q.C.T.L.C.) Pass on Q.C.T.L.C. private land between Kenepuru Saddle and just past Mistletoe Bay. The fee contributes to track maintenance, enhancement and access.

== Location ==
Point	Coordinates (links to map & photo sources)	Notes
Meretoto / Ship Cove	41.0946°S 174.2345°E	
Resolution Bay	41.1148°S 174.2178°E	
Endeavour Inlet	41.1025°S 174.1842°E	
Camp Bay/Kenepuru Saddle	41.1296°S 174.1426°E	
Tōrea Saddle/Portage Bay	41.2053°S 174.0328°E	
Mistletoe Bay/Te Mahia Saddle	41.2196°S 173.971°E	
Anakiwa	41.2644°S 173.9227°E	

== See also ==
- New Zealand tramping tracks
