= List of New Zealand places named by James Cook =

List of geographic locations named by explorer James Cook

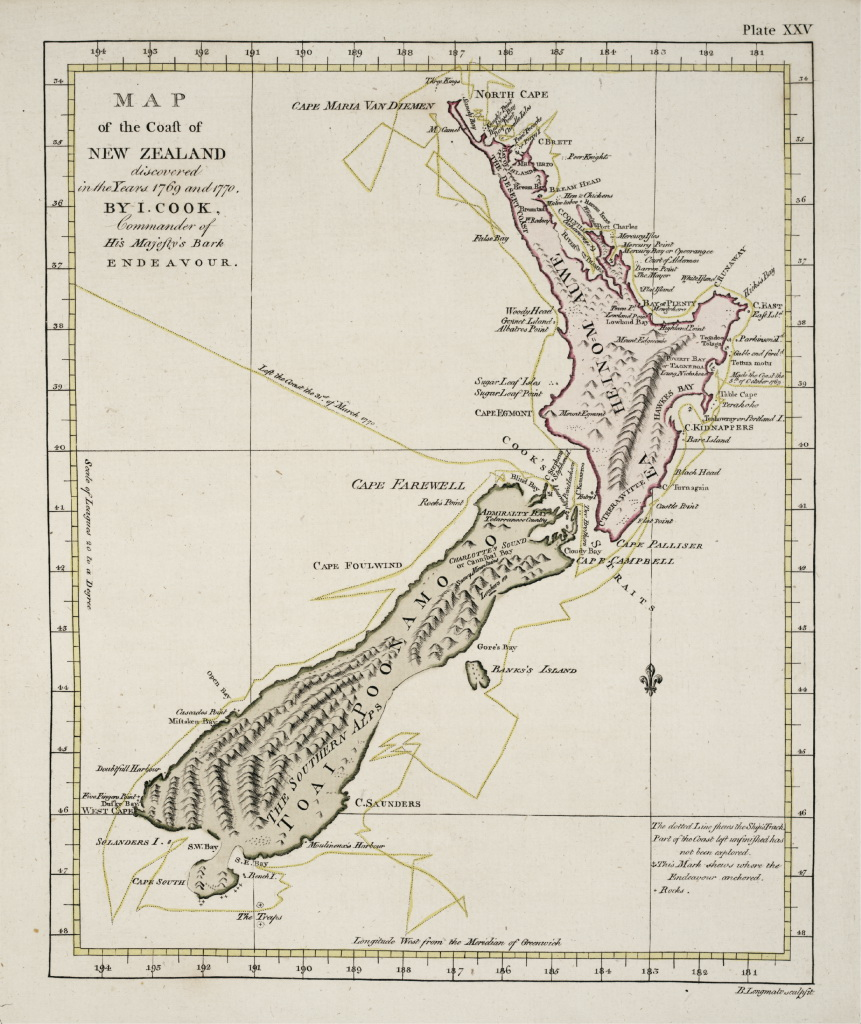
Chart of New Zealand explored 1769 and 1770 by Lieut. James Cook, commander of his majesty's barque Endeavour

This is a list of New Zealand places named by James Cook. Cook was the first European navigator to circumnavigate and chart the archipelago. He chose names from dull to droll to descriptive, from metaphorical to a narrative of events, or to honour people and to record the existing Māori language names of places. The list below is in the order described in Cook's journals of his first and second voyages to the Pacific.

== First voyage ==
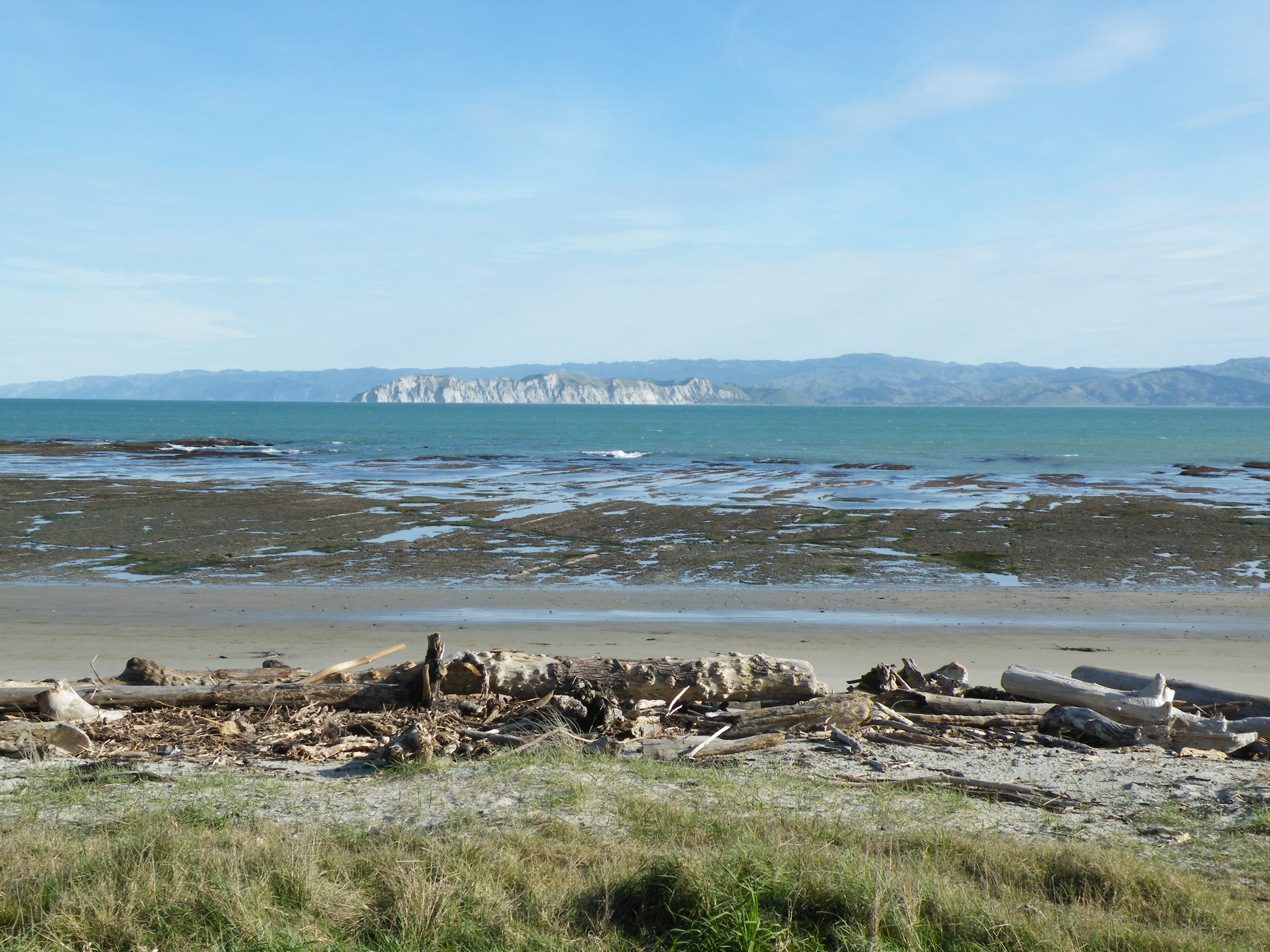
Young Nicks Head / Te Kuri o Pāoa

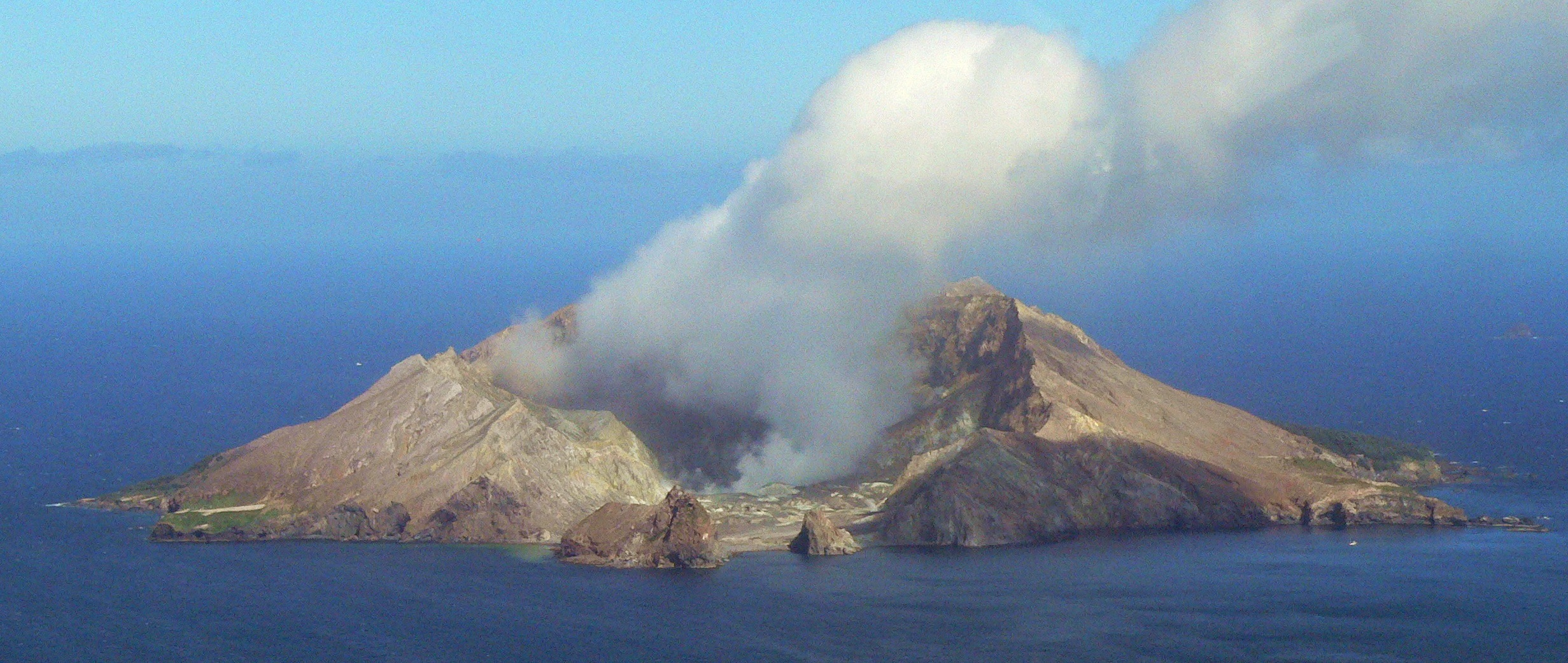
Whakaari - White Island Volcano

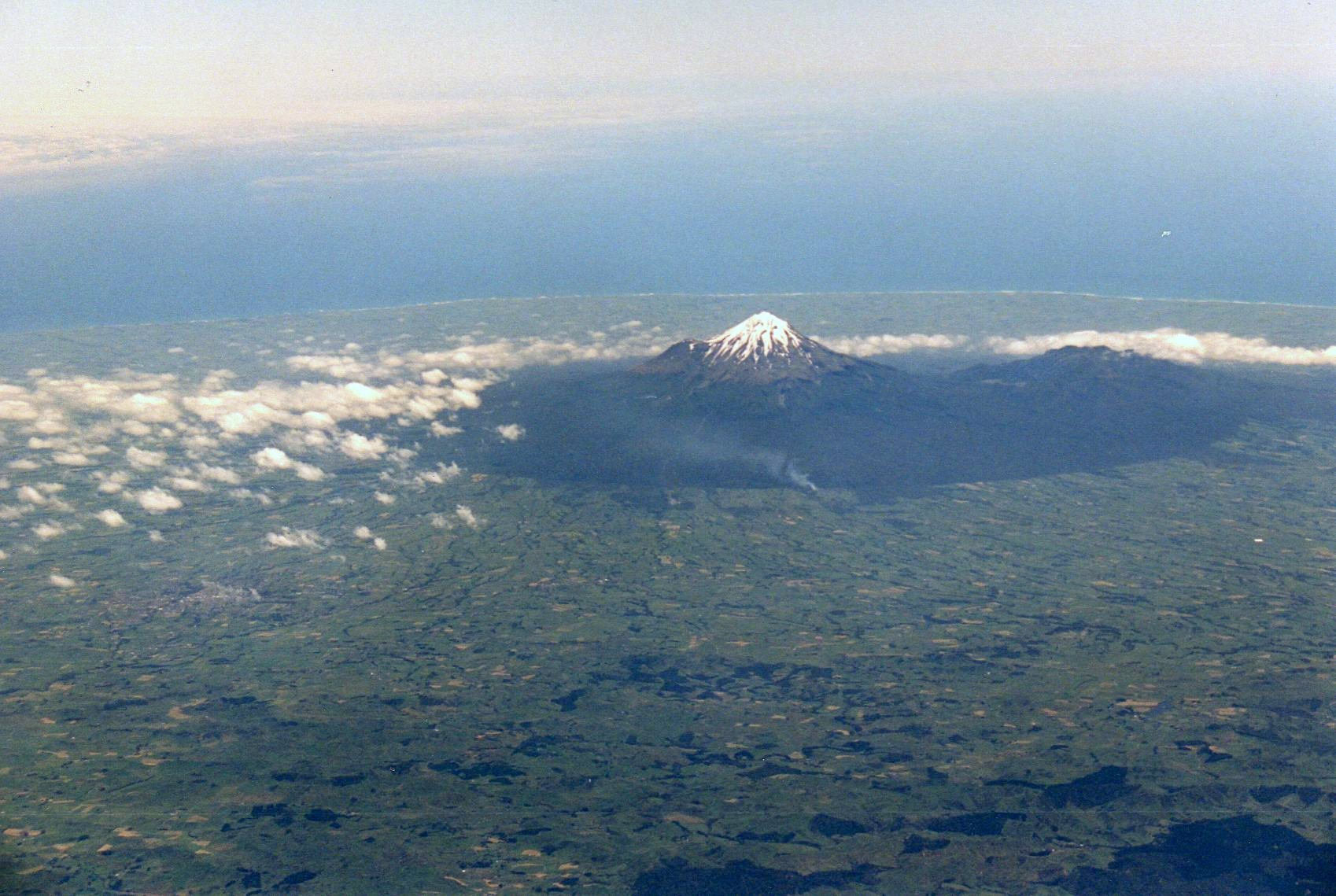
Mount Taranaki

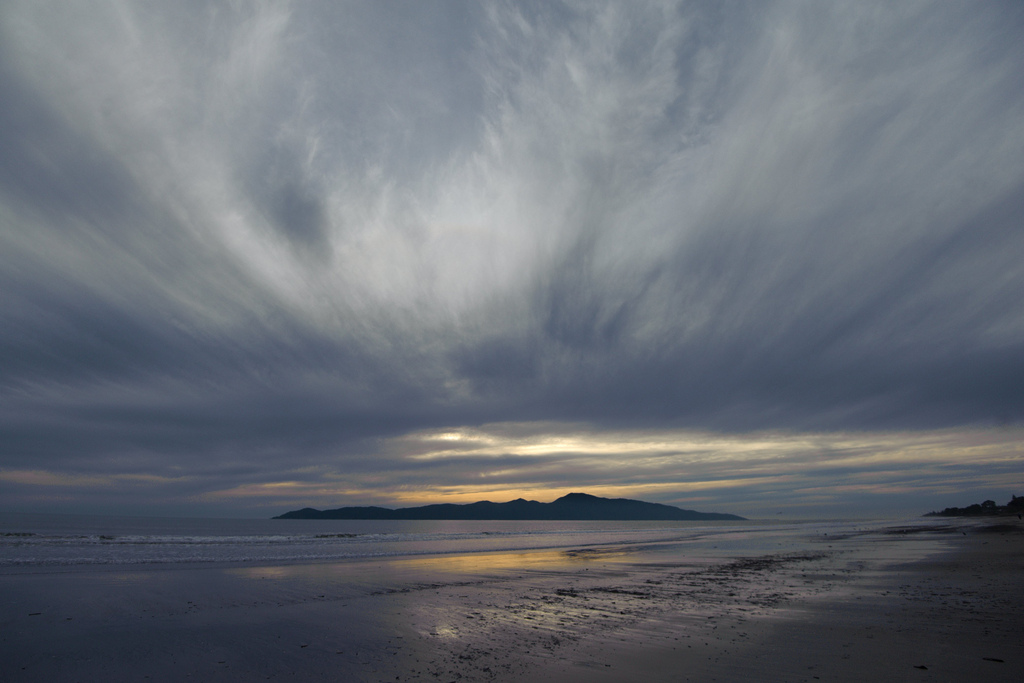
Kapiti Island

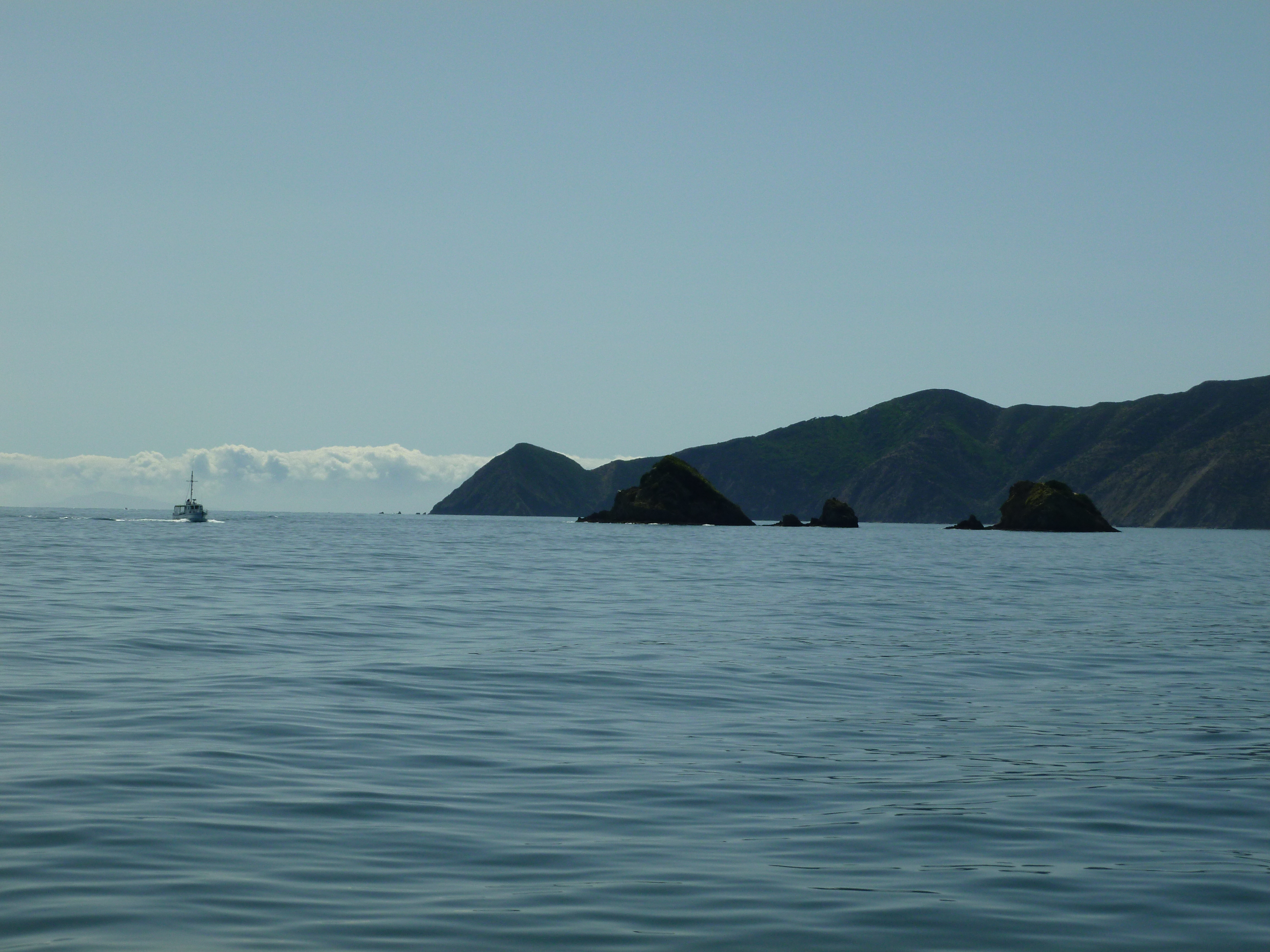
Cape Koamaru

The first voyage was in New Zealand waters during late 1769 and early 1770.

Name (and today's name) (Note: Over time the New Zealand Geographic Board Ngā Pou Taunaha o Aotearoa has implemented naming conventions and set about agreeing dual or alternate place names that remember both the Māori and European heritage of New Zealand; hence, where appropriate, today’s name is shown in brackets)	Date	Reason for naming (Note: Unless otherwise cited, all reasons come Cook's journals. Direct quotations are shown in double quotes)	Coords (Note: The shown coordinates are the actual latitude and longitude; although it is worth noting that Cook’s coordinates were accurate more often than not)	Notes
Poverty Bay (Tūranganui-a-Kiwa / Poverty Bay)	11 October	“because it afforded us no one thing we wanted”	38.7°S 177.966667°E	
Young Nicks Head / Te Kuri o Pāoa	11 October	After the 11-year-old boy who won a gallon of rum for being the first to sight land	38.757°S 177.9636°E	
Table Cape (Table Cape / Kahutara Point)	12 October	Shape and flat top	39.115°S 177.995°E	
Isle of Portland (Portland Island)	12 October	"on account of its very great resemblance to Portland in the English Channel"	39.283333°S 177.866667°E	
Cape Kidnapper (Cape Kidnappers / Te Kauwae-a-Māui)	15 October	For the attempt to kidnap Tupaia's young acolyte, Taiata	39.644693°S 177.093258°E	
Hawkes Bay	15 October	Sir Edward Hawke	39.333333°S 177.5°E	
Cape Turnagain	17 October	Cook sailed Endeavour south to this point, where upon meeting adverse conditions he turned and headed north again	40.4916°S 176.6173°E	
Gable End Foreland Head	20 October	"on account of the very great resemblance the white cliff at the very point hath to the Gable end of a House"	38.5275°S 178.2925°E	
Tegadoo (Anaura Bay)	22 October	"hath nothing to recommend it I shall give no discription of it"	38.247552°S 178.31593°E	
Tolaga Bay	23 October	The crew mistook the local name for this bay as Tolaga. It was actually Uawa	38.366667°S 178.3°E	
East Cape	31 October	Easternmost point of land on the whole coast	37.6927°S 178.5497°E	
East Island (East Island / Whangaokeno)	31 October	Off East Cape	37.691292°S 178.575861°E	
Cape Runaway	31 October	Five Māori waka frightened away by grape shot fired over their heads	37.55000°S 177.98333°E	
Hicks's Bay (Wharekahika / Hicks Bay)		First sited by Lieutenant Zachary Hickes	37.58333°S 178.30000°E	The lieutenant spelt his name Hickes; Cook wrote it without the "e" and it's stuck
White Island (Whakaari / White Island)	1 November	Appeared to be white in colour	37.51944°S 177.18167°E	White Island is an active volcano. It was evidently asleep at the time
Bay of Plenty (Bay of Plenty / Te Moana-a-Toi)		In contrast to Poverty Bay	37.66944°S 177.00000°E	The name and its connotation endures, despite being made from the deck of a ship out at sea
Mowtohora (Moutohora Island or Whale Island)	2 November		37.85556°S 176.98333°E	
Mount Edgecumbe (Mount Edgecumbe / Putauaki	2 November		38.10556°S 176.73583°E	
Mayor Island (Mayor Island / Tuhua)	3 November	In recognition of the Lord Mayor's Day to be held in London a few days later	37.28333°S 176.25000°E	
Aldermen Islands	3 November	A cluster of islands and rocks reminiscent of the Court of Aldermen	36.96667°S 176.08333°E	
Mercury Bay	16 November	Transit of Mercury observed from here	36.78333°S 175.80000°E	The long sandy beach in Mercury Bay where Cook landed is now called Cooks Beach
Opoorage (Purangi Estuary)	16 November	Some scholars argue that Opoorage applied the whole of Mercury Bay	36.862592°S 175.70529°E	
River of Mangroves	16 November	"As we did not learn that the Natives had any name for this River, I have called it the River of Mangroves, because of the great quantity of these Trees that are found in it"		
Thames River (Waihou River / Firth of Thames)	21 November	"on account of its bearing some resemblance to that River in England"	37.168000°S 175.5416000°E	
Cape Colvill (Cape Colville)	24 November	"in honour of the Right hon'ble the Lord Colvill"	36.469806°S 175.3452972°E	Cook served under Rear Admiral Lord Colville in Newfoundland
Barrier Isles (Great Barrier Island)	24 November	a chain of islands lying across the mouth of the harbour now known as Coromandel Harbour	36.16667°S 175.38333°E	
Point Rodney (Cape Rodney)	24 November		36.28333°S 174.81667°E	
Bream Bay	25 November	"we caught between 90 and 100 Bream (a fish so called)"	35.94583°S 174.51667°E	It is thought these fish were snapper. In a jovial mood, he called the two headlands of the bay, Bream Head and Bream Tail
Hen and Chicken Islands	25 November	A group of islands shaped like a hen and her chickens	35.93333°S 174.73333°E	
Poor Knights (Poor Knights Islands)	25 November	Possibly for a resemblance to a kind of dessert	35.50000°S 174.75000°E	
Cape Brett (Cape Brett Peninsula /Rākaumangamanga)	27 November	After Peircy Brett	35.172889°S 174.331000°E	“At the very point of the Cape is a high round Hillock… with a hole pierced thro' it like the Arch of a Bridge, and this was one reason why I gave the Cape the above name, because Piercy seem'd very proper for that of the Island”
Point Pococke (Cape Wiwiki)	27 November		35.15556°S 174.12333°E	
Cavalle Isles Cavalli Islands	27 November	After the cavally fish sold to the crew from a passing Māori waka	34.96667°S 173.96667°E	
Bay of Islands	5 December	"on account of the Great Number which line its shores"	35.20000°S 174.16667°E	
Whale Rock (Te Nunuhe Rock / Whale Rock)	5 December	A sunken rock hit by Endeavour with no perceptible damage	35.17500°S 174.26083°E	
Doubtless Bay	9 December	"the wind not permitting us to look into this Bay"	34.92083°S 173.46528°E	
Knockle Point (Knuckle Point)	10 December	Juts out from a Doubtless Bay headland	34.84917°S 173.48250°E	
Mount Camel (Tohoraha / Mount Camel)	10 December	A large hill with a small dip in the top, standing upon a barren desert-like shore	34.82056°S 173.15944°E	
Sandy Bay (Rangaunu Bay)	10 December	"nothing but white sand thrown up in low irregular hills"	34.80611°S 173.25944°E	From here Endeavour tacked out to the Three Kings Islands and back to Cape Maria van Dieman named by Abel Tasman
North Cape	19 December	Northernmost point of land on the whole coast	34.41528°S 173.05111°E	
The Desert Coast (Ripiro Beach)		“wears a most desolate and inhospitable aspect” and “Nothing is to be seen but long sand Hills”		Named for the extensive barren sand hills along the coast. Some records record it as The Desart Coast and some The Desert Coast.
False Bay (Kaipara Harbour)	8 January	"the appearance of a Bay or inlet, but I believe it is only low land"	36.41750°S 174.16194°E	
Woody Head	10 January	Lushly wooded	37.86417°S 174.75667°E	No such point nowadays on maps; near Te Toto Gorge.
Gannet Island (Motutakupu Island / Gannet Island))	10 January	"on account of the Great Number of these Birds we saw upon it"	36.68444°S 175.37389°E	Historic maps show this island to be at (-37.97693, 174.57320), where no Island can be found.
Albetross Point (Albatross Point)	10 January	After the birdlife	38.10750°S 174.68417°E	No such point nowadays on maps; near Arohaki Bay.
Mount Egmont (Mount Taranaki, or Mount Egmont)	13 January	After the Earl of Egmont, First Lord of the Admiralty from 1763 to 1766	39.29611°S 174.06389°E	Today, the volcano has two official names
Cape Egmont	13 January	At the foot of Mount Egmont	39.27583°S 173.75333°E	
Sugar Loaf Isles (Sugar Loaf Islands / Ngā Motu)	13 January	Sugar Loaf Point on the mainland "riseth to a good height in the very form of a Sugar Loaf"	39.04944°S 174.02778°E	
Entry Isle (Kapiti Island)	14 February	A high remarkable Island guarding the entrance to Cooks Strait	40.86667°S 174.90000°E	
Queen Charlotte's Sound (Queen Charlotte Sound / Tōtaranui)	15 January	Queen Charlotte, the wife of the reigning British monarch	41.25000°S 174.0158833°E	
Ship Cove (Meretoto / Ship Cove)	16 January	Here the ship Endeavour was careened "(she being very foul)"	41.09306°S 174.23889°E	Cook returned here numerous times, using it as a base on his second and third voyages
Isle Hamote (Long Island)	31 January	An island in the outer Queen Charlotte Sound	41.1137972°S 174.2845333°E	
West Bay (Endeavour Inlet)		A placeholder name until someone came up with a better one	41.13028°S 174.17361°E	
Cannibals Cove (Anaho)		A bay, possibly called Anahou or Anaho, was labelled by Cook and several others as "Cannibals Cove" on their maps	41.07917°S 174.25278°E	
Motuouru Island Motuara Island)	31 January	An island in the outer Queen Charlotte Sound where there was a Pā	41.08111°S 174.25611°E	After gaining permission from Topaa, an elder from the pa, Cook and his men erected a post on the highest part of the Island, and hoisted the British flag
Eahei no Mauwe (North Island or Te Ika-a-Māui)		On 29 January, Cook climbed to "the Top of a pretty high hill" on Arapaoa Island, and later after consulting with Topaa, he determined that the land he had seen to north...		
T’avai Poenammoo (South Island or Te Waipounamu)	31 January	... and to the south (from where he had stood) was not part of a continent, but rather two islands separated by a strait		
Cook's Strait (Cook Strait)		"some of the Officers had just started, that Aeheino Mouwe was not an Island… For my own part, I had seen so far into this Sea the first time I discover'd the Strait, together with many other Concurrent testimonies of its being an Island, that no such supposition ever enter'd my thoughts; but being resolved to clear up every doubt that might Arise on so important an Object, I steer'd North-East" until all the officers were satisfied	41.22944°S 174.48306°E	While this name appears on Cook's chart, it is worth noting Cook is not known for naming places after himself, and it is speculated that Joseph Banks bestowed the name of the strait (or as Banks spells it in his diary "Cooks streights")
Cape Teerawhitte Cape Terawhiti	31 January	A cape to the east on the North Island side of Cook Strait	41.2843639°S 174.6132722°E	Some scholars have pointed out that Topaa may simply have pointed out "east" rather than a particular headland
Cape Koamaroo Cape Koamaru	7 February	Southeast head of Queen Charlotte Sound "called by the Natives, Koamaroo"	41.08833°S 174.38139°E	Similar to Cape Terawhiti, this name may have been misinterpreted
Cape Pallisser (Cape Palliser)	7 February	After Hugh Palliser	41.61361°S 175.29028°E	Palliser was captain of HMS Eagle, Cook's first ship in the Royal Navy
Cloudy Bay (Te Koko-o-Kupe / Cloudy Bay)	7 February	Weather cloudy	41.45000°S 174.16667°E	
Cape Campbel (Cape Campbel) / Te Karaka)	8 February	John Campbell, who introduced Cook to the Royal Society	41.7372000°S 174.276000°E	
Castle Point; Castlepoint	11 February	A remarkable hillock	40.91139°S 176.21917°E	
Lookers-on (Kaikōura Peninsula)	14 February	The occupants of four waka gazed in wonder, but could be tempted to paddle closer	42.43167°S 173.71083°E	
Gore's Bay (Gore Bay, New Zealand)	16 February	Presumably to flatter Lieutenant Gore following a fruitless search for land that Gore saw, or thought he saw out to sea east of Banks Island. Cook was certain it was clouds	42.85917°S 173.30917°E	
Banks Island (Banks Peninsula)	17 February	After Joseph Banks	43.75000°S 172.833000°E	Cook mistook Banks Peninsula for an island – one of his few mistakes
Cape Saunders	25 February	Charles Saunders	45.8735472°S 170.7347056°E	
South East Bay (Foveaux Strait)		"we could not see this land join to that to the Northward of us, there either being a total separation, a deep Bay, or low land between them"	46.67000°S 168.18000°E	Along with South East Bay and Bench Island, Cook initially draw Foveaux Strait and Stewart Island / Rakiura on his chart; however, he later amended it to depict Steward Island as a peninsula, possibly to hide his discovery for reasons of military and colonial policy or more likely because he made an error, as his focus was on finding the southern extent of New Zealand, and conditions were unfavourable for more closely exploring the possible strait
Bench Island (Ruapuke Island)	6 March	"low land, making like an Island"	46.78333°S 168.50000°E	
The Traps (North Trap and South Trap)	9 March	Ledges of rock, that lie "such as to catch unwary Strangers", from which Endeavour had "a very fortunate Escape"	47.38333°S 167.85000°E	
South Cape (South Cape / Whiore)	10 March	Southernmost point of land on the whole coast	47.29250°S 167.54917°E	
Solander's Isles (Solander Islands / Hautere)	11 March	Daniel Solander	46.57250°S 166.89639°E	
West Cape	14 March	Westernmost point of land upon the whole Coast	45.91000°S 166.43806°E	
Dusky Bay (Dusky Sound)	14 March	Cook wanted to go in but found the distance too great to run before dusk	45.76250°S 166.58361°E	
Five Fingers Point	14 March	"5 high peaked rocks, standing up like the 4 fingers and thumb of a Man's hand"	45.74139°S 166.45472°E	
Doubtful Harbour (Doubtful Sound / Patea)	14 March	"it certainly would have been highly imprudent in me to have put into a place where we could not have got out"	45.26833°S 166.86667°E	"I mention this because there was some on board that wanted me to harbour at any rate, without in the least Considering either the present or future Consequences"
Mistaken Bay (in vicinity of Big Bay)	16 March	"appearance of an inlet into the land; but upon a nearer approach found that it was only a deep Valley"	44.28639°S 168.06694°E	
Cascades Point (Cascade Point)	17 March	"deep Red Clifts, down which falls 4 Small streams of Water"	44.00861°S 168.36667°E	
Open Bay (Jackson Bay / Okahu)	17 March		43.98000°S 168.63194°E	
Snowey Mouintains (Southern Alps)	18 March	Cook did not sight (or name) Aoraki / Mount Cook, the highest mountain in New Zealand; however, he did describe the range of snow covered alps that runs down the island almost from one end to the other		
Cape Foulwind	About 21 March	Foul gales for days on end	41.74528°S 171.46889°E	
Rocks Point	23 March	Many dangerous rocks awash	40°51′00″S 172°08′00″E	
Admiralty Bay	31 March	Seeking a promotion?	40.94083°S 173.87472°E	
Stephens Island (Stephens Island / Takapourewa)	31 March	Philip Stephens	40.67056°S 173.99833°E	
Cape Stephens	31 March	Northernmost point of Rangitoto ki te Tonga / D'Urville Island	40.69222°S 173.96583°E	
Blind Bay (Golden Bay / Mohua and Tasman Bay / Te Tai-o-Aorere)	31 March	A deep dead end bay	40.62083°S 172.93722°E 40.99889°S 173.46917°E	Now recognised as two bays divided by Separation Point / Te Matau
Cape Jackson	31 March	George Jackson	40.99389°S 174.31472°E	
Cape Farewell	31 March	He made his farewells, and sailed away, steering west on his long voyage home	40.49833°S 172.68861°E	

== Second Voyage ==
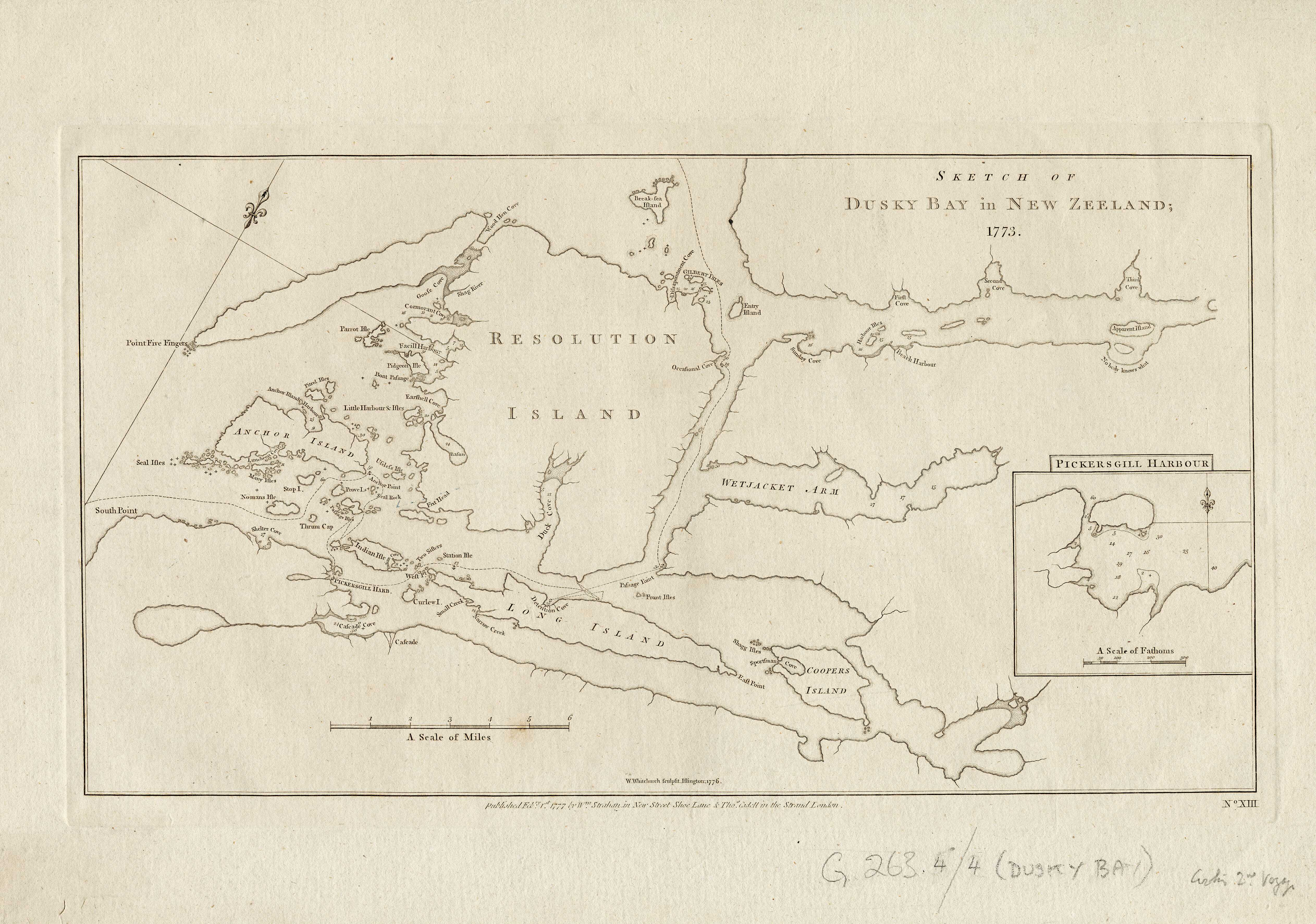
Cook's sketch of Dusky Bay in New Zealand, 1773

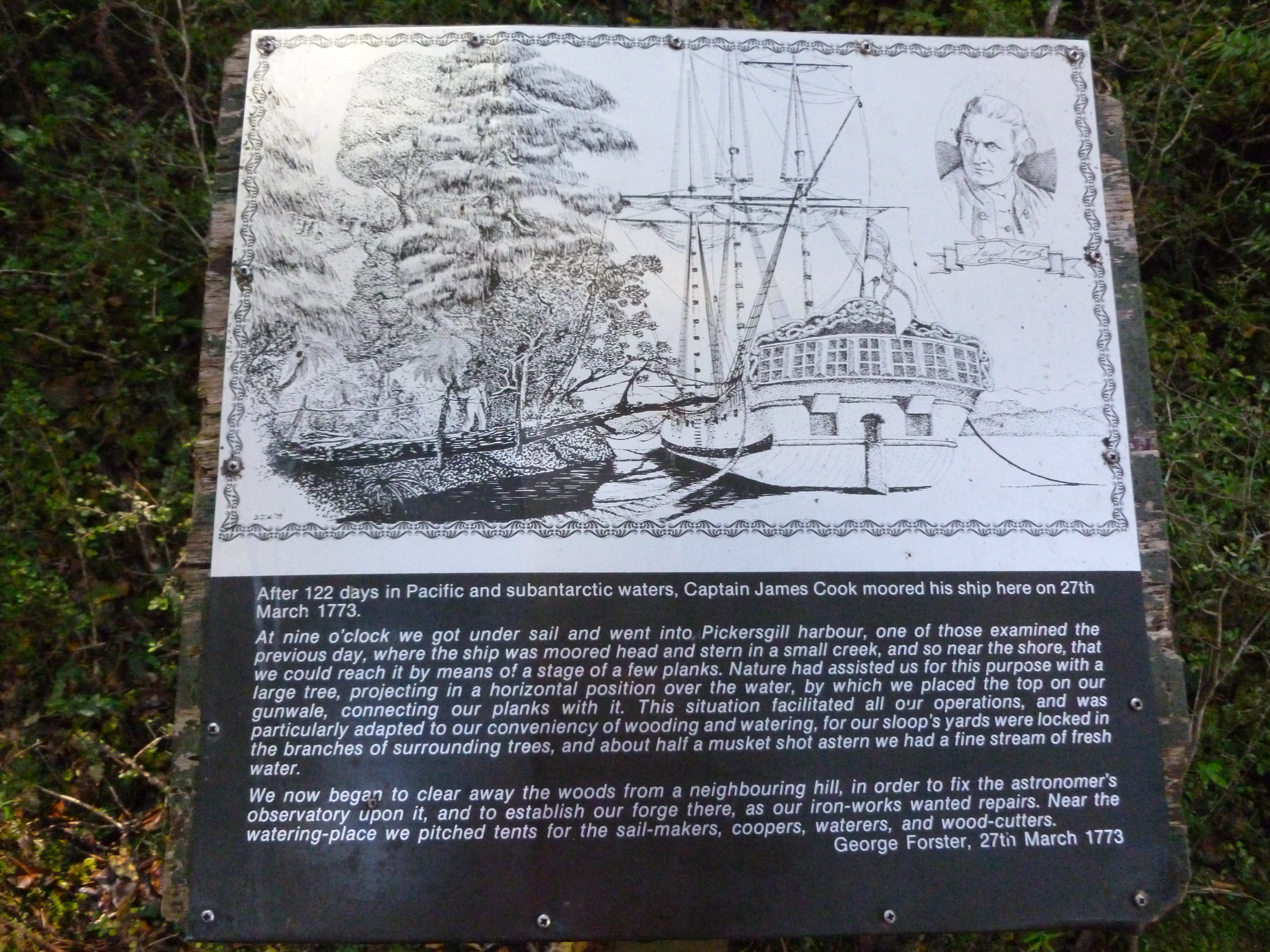
An engraving on the boardwalk at Astronomer Point that describes James Cook and the Resolution's visit to Pickersgill Harbour, 1773

In the autumn of 1773, Cook and the crew of Resolution recuperated in Dusky Sound / Tamatea, after 122 days at sea in the Pacific and Southern Ocean.

Name (and today's name)	Date	Reason for naming	Coords	Notes
South Point	26 March	Point of land at the southern entrance to the fiord	45.81333°S 166.45506°E	
Anchor Island	26 March	The first place the Resolution anchored	45.743808°S 166.508102°E	
Pickersgill Harbour	27 March	A convenient Harbour discovered by Richard Pickersgill where the Resolution moored for after 122 days at sea in the Pacific and sub-Antarctic waters	45.79382°S 166.58060°E	Astronomer Point, where William Wales established an observatory, was named later on
Indian Cove (Cascade Cove)	2 April	After a Tamatea family who “seemed rather afraid when we approached the Rock with our Boat, he however stood firm”	45.80000°S 166.60000°E	
Luncheon Cove	2 April	Ate their lunch	45.76667°S 166.52500°E	
Supper Cove	2 April	Ate their dinner	45.70874°S 166.94876°E	
Resolution Island	6 April	The ship that brought them there	45.643148°S 166.584063°E	
Duck Cove	6 April	“In this Cove we shott fourteen Ducks”	45.728053°S 166.605606°E	
Indian Island	6 April	Cook befriended the indigenous people here	45.77818°S 166.58723°E	
Places named in vicinity of Anchor Island: Shelter Cove; Seal Islands; Many Islands; No Mans Island; Stop Island; Thrum Cap; Passage Islands; Prove Island; Seal Rock; Anchor Point; Useless Island; Little Harbour and islands; Anchor Island and Harbour; Petrel Islands	12–17 Apr			Thrum caps are the unspun raw wool hats worn by sailors
Places named on western side of Resolution Island: Fixed Head; The Bason; Earshell Cove; Boat Passage; Pigeon Island; Facile Harbour; Parrot Island; Cormorant Cove; Goose Cove; Shag River	12–17 Apr			
Long Island	20 April	A very long island	45.765248°S 166.635904°E	
Other places named in vicinity of Long Island: Curlew Island; Small Creek; Narrow Creek; Detention Cove; West Point; Station Island; East Point; Front Islands; Cooper Island; Shag Islands; Sportsman Cove; Two Sisters	20 April			Cook Channel lies between Long Island the mainland, but needless to say Cook did not this after himself
Goose Cove	23 Apr	Released five geese they brought with them from Cape of Good Hope	45.68333°S 166.55000°E	
Passage (Acheron Passage)	5 May		45.65680°S 166.72465°E	
Passage Point	5 May		45.72917°S 166.72917°E	
Occasional Cove	6 May		45.61667°S 166.70556°E	
Wet Jacket Arm	8 May	Richard Pickersgill coped a downpour there	45.66667°S 166.75000°E	
Places named in inner Breaksea Sound / Puaitaha: Sunday Cove; Harbour Island; Beach Harbour; First Cove; Second Cove; Third Cove; Apparent Island; Nobody knows what (Broughton Arm)	9 May	Sunday Cove was visited on a Sunday. Apparently, Apparent Island was an apparition, because it does not exist.		Cook call Broughton Arm “Nobody knows what” because he did not have time to explore it. In 1791, George Vancouver did have time renamed it “Somebody knows what”
Places named in outer Breaksea Sound / Puaitaha: Entry Island; Gilbert Islands; Disappointment Cove; Woodhen Cove; Breaksea Island	11 May	Breaksea Island is so named because it protects the western entrance (now called Breaksea Sound / Puaitaha) from the violent and predominant southwest swell		From here Resolution set sail for Queen Charlotte Sound

== See also ==
- List of Australian places named by James Cook
