= South Cape =

South Cape may refer to:

- South Cape (Indonesia), on the island of Borneo
- South Cape, New Guinea, a point of land in Milne Bay Province near the Brumer Islands
- South Cape / Whiore, on the south coast of Stewart Island / Rakiura, New Zealand
- Taukihepa/Big South Cape Island, an offshore island of New Zealand
- Sørkapp, Svalbard, Norway
- South Cape Municipality, Western Cape, South Africa
- South Cape Beach State Park, a state park located in Mashpee, Massachusetts, US
- South Cape May, New Jersey, a borough that once existed in Cape May County, New Jersey, US

== Other uses ==
- South Cape Halt, a stop on the Manx Electric Railway

== See also ==
- South West Cape (disambiguation)
