= Gore Bay =

Gore Bay may refer to:

- Gore Bay, New Zealand
- Gore Bay, Ontario
- Gore Bay, New South Wales – and inlet on the northern foreshore of Sydney Harbour
