= Meretoto / Ship Cove =

Locality in New Zealand

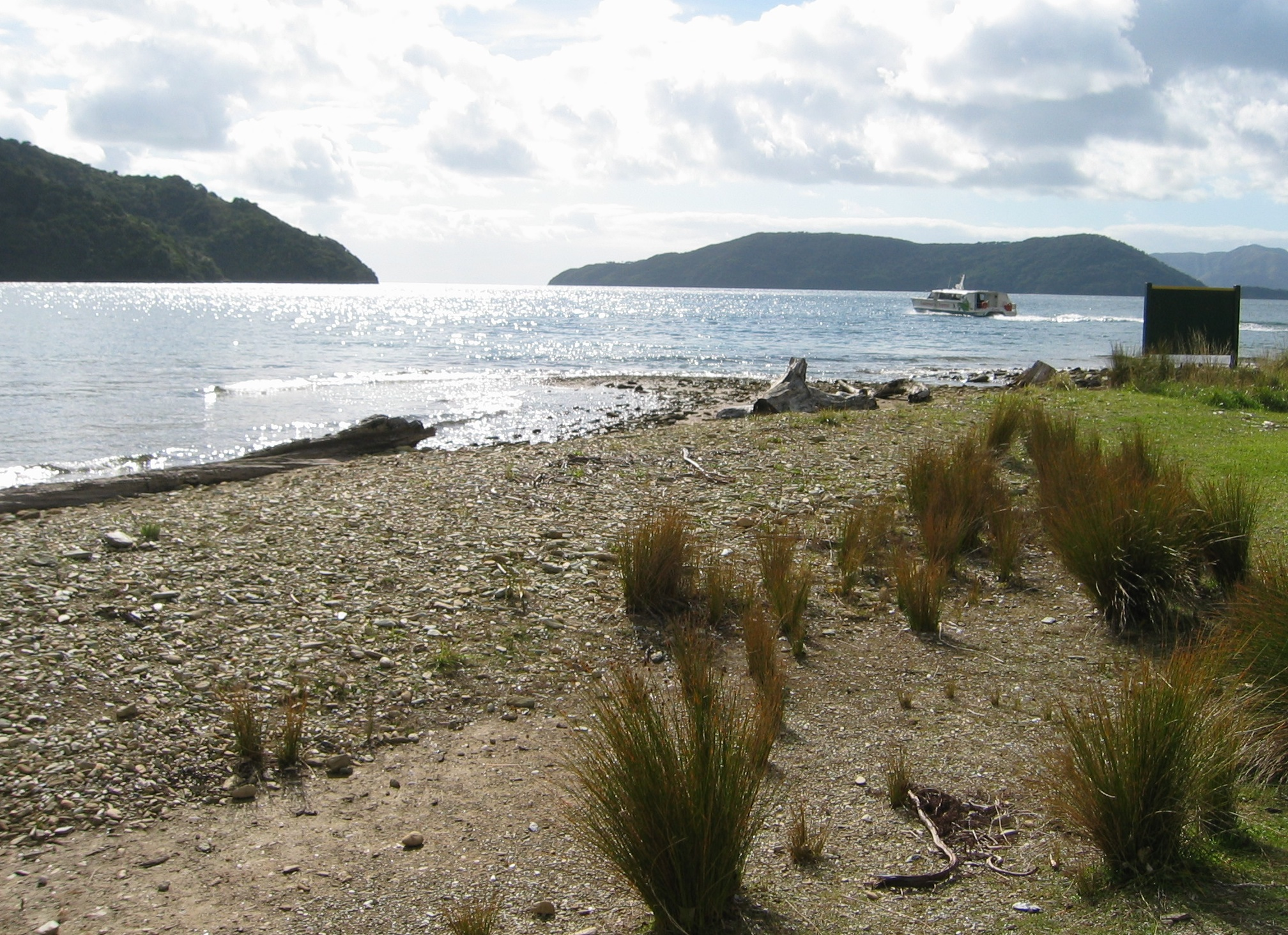
- View across the sound to Motuara Island from Ship Cove in 2004

- Location of Meretoto / Ship Cove within the Marlborough Sounds
- Location: Marlborough Sounds
- Coordinates: 41°05′35″S 174°14′20″E
- Etymology: Named for the location where James Cook anchored his ship. 'Meretoto' has unclear origins

Meretoto / Ship Cove is a small bay in the Marlborough Sounds in New Zealand. It is located near the entrance of Queen Charlotte Sound / Tōtaranui, west of nearby Motuara Island and Long Island.

Explorer James Cook anchored his ships here and hence named it Ship Cove; however, in 2014 the official name was altered to "Meretoto / Ship Cove", to reflect its original Māori name. While Ship Cove is a descriptive name, little is known about the origin of the name Meretoto. One possible translation is "bloody mere".

The site is a Category 1 listed historic place and is managed by the Department of Conservation.

== Early history ==
Māori oral tradition holds the belief that the first person to visit Tōtaranui was the legendary Polynesian explorer, Kupe. The entrance to the sound was a jumping-off point between the North Island and the South Island. The cove was valued by Māori as a place of shelter before crossing the Cook Strait and as a place to rest up after the trip.

In the late 1770s, people did not live permanently at the cove. They came to fish and gather seasonal foods in the summer.

== James Cook's visits ==
On 15 January 1770, Cook anchored HMS Endeavour in the cove, and used it as a base to replenish supplies of food, water and wood after his long Pacific voyage. While his ship was overhauled at anchor, Cook made a headquarters on the shore, ordering the planting of vegetable gardens and construction of an enclosure for pigs. Cook would return to the cove a further five times over the course of his first, second and third voyages to the Pacific Ocean, In other parts of New Zealand the contact was brief, but here it was sustained.

== After Cook’s visit ==
The publication of Cook’s First Voyage put Ship Cove on the world map, drawing whalers and other explorers to it. By 1810, whalers had called in there. People from Anaho, a bay just to the north, were in close contact with whalers. They helped the visitors and some would convert to Christianity. and learned to read and write.

In May 1820, the Russian ships Vostok and Mirny under the command of Fabien von Bellingshausen sailed into the bay, using a chart based on one made on Cook’s first voyage, and anchored in the shelter of Motuara Island, where HMS Resolution had anchored in May 1773. He and his men had cautious but friendly contact with the local Māori, trading knives and axes for fish and curios, many of which are now held by museums in St Petersburg and Kazan. Colonel William Wakefield, one of the founders of Wellington, also anchored his ship Tory in the cove in 1839.

Māori chiefs from the area signed the Treaty of Waitangi on 4 and 5 May, and 17 June 1840.

In 1896, approximately 2,000 acres (8.1 km^{2}) of land around the cove was declared a scenic reserve in honour of Captain Cook. In 1987, responsibility for the Ship Cove Historic Reserve passed to the Department of Conservation (New Zealand). In 1906 the Blenheim Rifle Company held a summer picnic at the cove with over 500 in attendance. At the picnic plans for a memorial to Captain Cook were discussed and on 11 February 1913, 2,000 people gathered at the cove for the unveiling of the monument by the Governor Arthur Foljambe. In 1970 a re-enactment of Cook's landing was staged for Queen Elizabeth's visit.
