= South West Cape =

South West Cape may refer to:

- South West Cape, Tasmania, a cape at the south-west corner of Tasmania
- South West Cape, New Zealand, a cape on Stewart Island, New Zealand
