= Long Island (Marlborough) =

Island in Queen Charlotte Sound in New Zealand

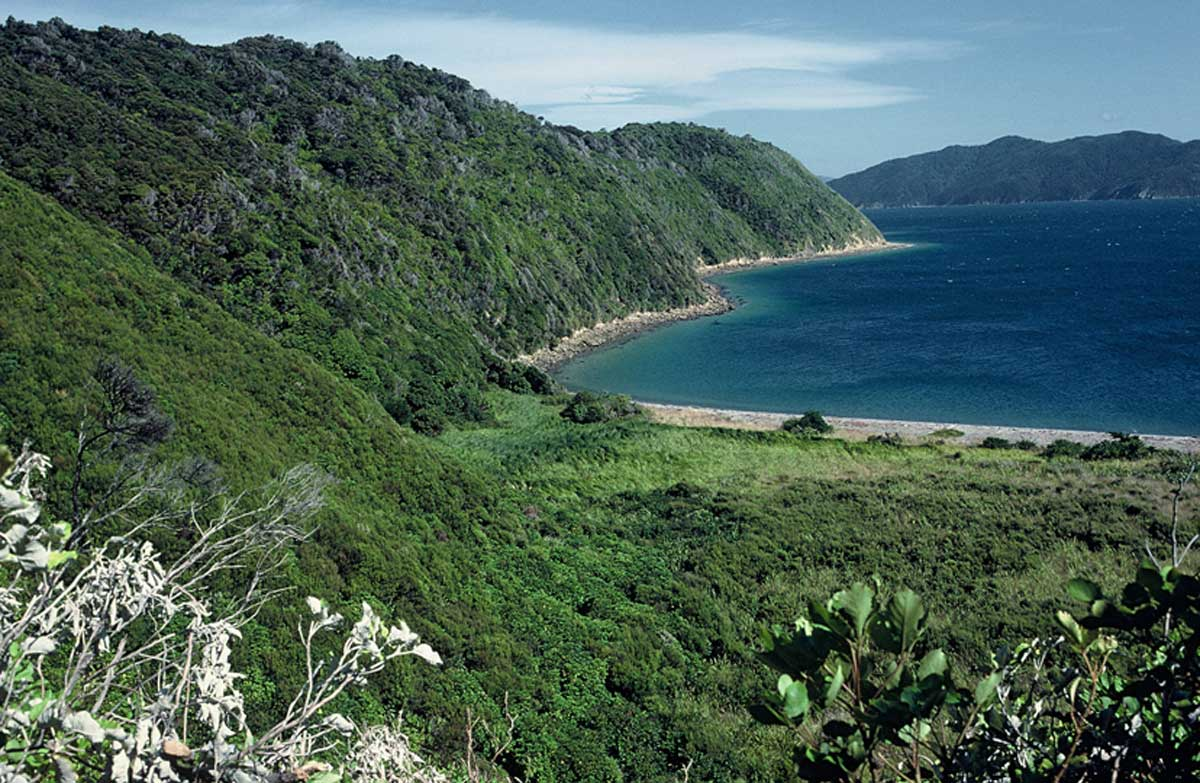

Geography
- Location: Marlborough Region
- Coordinates: 41°06′49.67″S 174°17′4.32″E
- Area: 1.41 km^{2} (0.54 sq mi)
- Length: 4 km (2.5 mi)
- Width: 1 km (0.6 mi)
- Highest elevation: 152 m (499 ft)

Administration
- Department of Conservation (New Zealand)

Demographics
- Population: 0

Long Island is located in Queen Charlotte Sound, one of the Marlborough Sounds of New Zealand. James Cook recorded its original name as Hamote.

The island is long and thin - just over 1.41 square kilometres (0.54 sq mi) in area with a length of 4 km (2.5 mi) (the long axis being aligned north-east to south-west) and a maximum width of 1 km (0.62 mi). It was reserved for public utility on 26 March 1926 and soon after became a farm which ran between 300 and 400 sheep until 14 January 1926 when the island became a scenic reserve. With the removal of stock in the 1930s the island has been left to regenerate back into native bush.

In April 1993, the Long Island-Kokomohua Marine reserve was created around Long island and the tiny Kokomohua islands off its northern tip. It extends 460 metres (1,510 ft) offshore from the high water mark around the islands and was the first Marine reserve to be created in the South Island. The island itself is also an important wildlife refuge and a number of species of threatened endemic birds which have been reintroduced to it including little spotted kiwi (late 1980s), yellow-crowned parakeet (2001) and South Island saddleback (2005) - all these reintroductions have been successful with healthy breeding populations of each species now present on the Island.

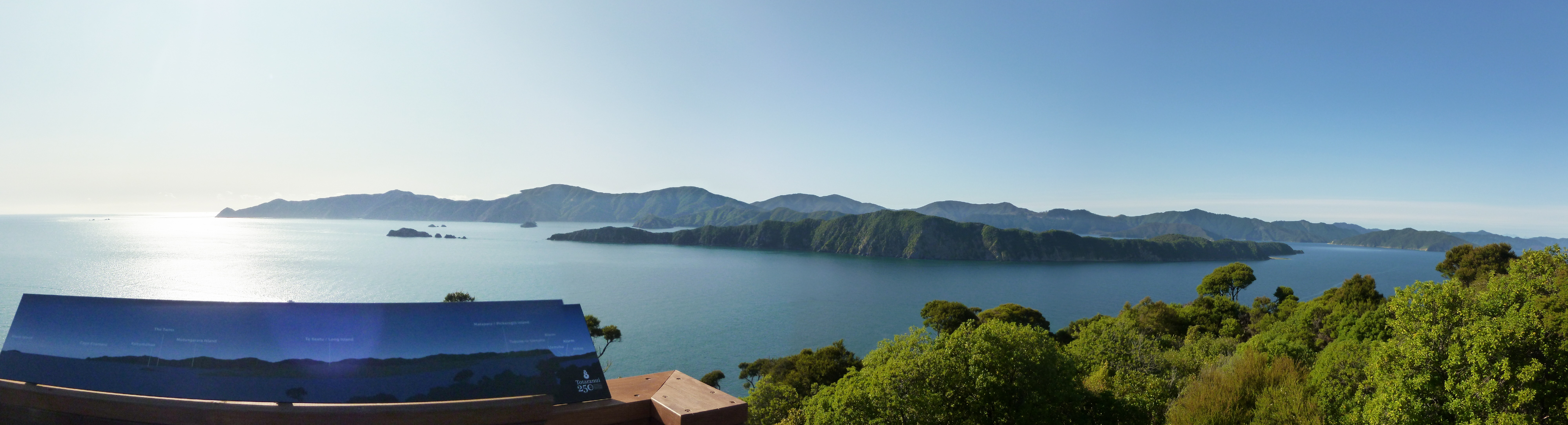
Panorama from Cape Koamaru to Long Island as viewed from the lookout tower on the summit of Motuara Island

== See also ==
- List of islands of New Zealand
- List of islands
- Desert island
