= Allports Island =

Island in New Zealand

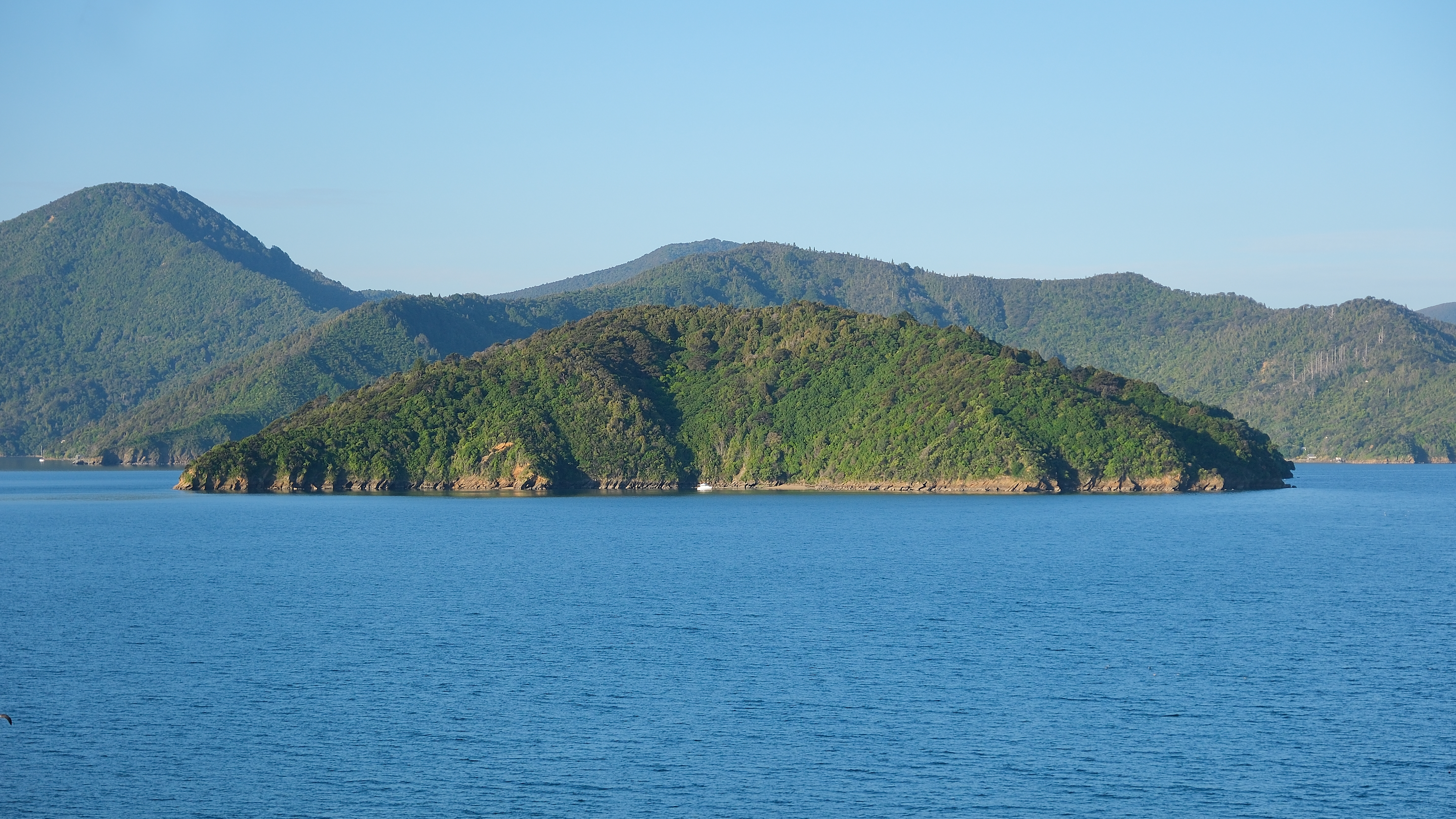
- Allports Island in Queen Charlotte Sound
- Interactive map of Allports Island

Geography
- Location: Queen Charlotte Sound
- Coordinates: 41°14′13″S 174°3′24″E
- Length: 0.5 km (0.31 mi)
- Width: 0.5 km (0.31 mi)
- Highest elevation: 79 m (259 ft)

Administration
- New Zealand

Demographics
- Population: 0

Allports Island is a small uninhabited island located in Queen Charlotte Sound in Marlborough, New Zealand. It reaches a height of 79 metres (259 ft) and is 1 kilometre (0.62 mi) from the New Zealand mainland. An even smaller unnamed island lies immediately to the east of it. Both islands are covered in native bush.

== See also ==
- List of islands of New Zealand
- List of islands
- Desert island
