= East Cape Lighthouse =

Lighthouse in New Zealand

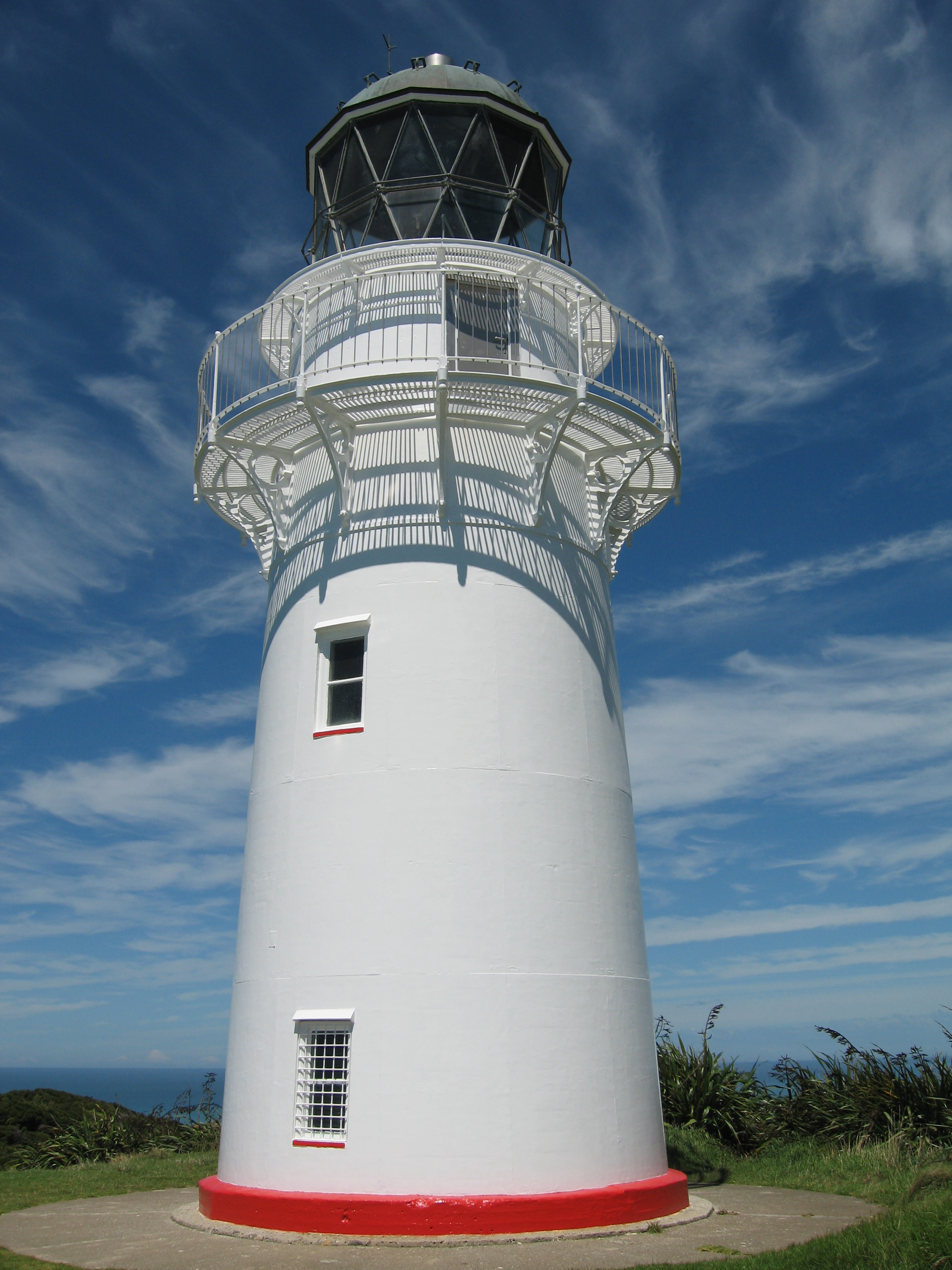
- Location: Otiki Hill, East Cape; North Island; New Zealand
- Coordinates: 37°41′20.2″S 178°32′53.3″E

Tower
- Constructed: 1900
- Construction: cast iron tower
- Automated: 1985
- Height: 15 metres (49 ft)
- Shape: cylindrical tower with balcony and lantern
- Markings: white tower, black lantern roof
- Power source: mains electricity
- Operator: Maritime New Zealand

Light
- First lit: 1900
- Focal height: 154 metres (505 ft)
- Range: 35 kilometres (22 mi)
- Characteristic: Fl W 10s.

East Cape Lighthouse is a lighthouse sited on Otiki Hill above East Cape, the easternmost point on the North Island of New Zealand. It is owned and operated by Maritime New Zealand. The lighthouse was originally constructed on nearby East Island. However the island was difficult to access (four men died during tower construction when their boat capsized) and proved to be susceptible to earthquakes and subsequent landslips. In 1920 a decision was made to relocate the light to the mainland and in April 1922, the light was extinguished and then relit at its current location in December of that year. Originally manned by three lighthouse keepers, the light's staffing was progressively reduced until it was fully automated in 1985. It is now controlled from the Maritime New Zealand headquarters in Wellington. While the area around the light is accessible by foot, the lighthouse itself is not open to the public.

== See also ==
- List of lighthouses in New Zealand
