= Queen Charlotte Sound / Tōtaranui =

Sound in the Marlborough Sounds, New Zealand

- Tōtaranui (Māori)
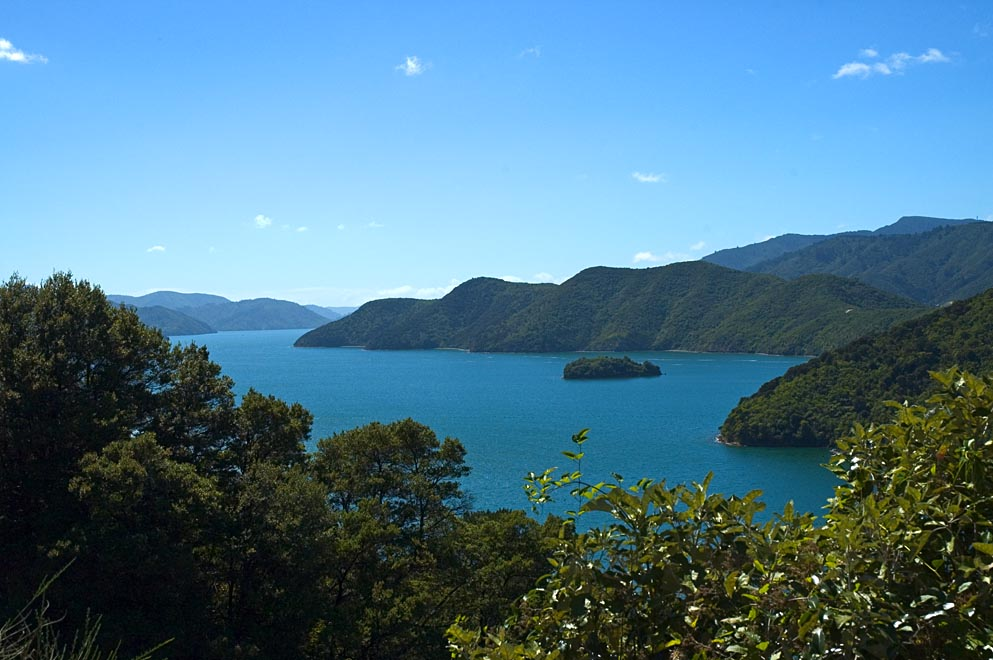
- Queen Charlotte Sound

- Queen Charlotte Sound within the Marlborough Sounds of New Zealand Queen Charlotte Sound / Tōtaranui (New Zealand)
- Location: Marlborough Region, New Zealand
- Coordinates: 41°15′00.00″S 174°00′57.18″E
- Type: Ria
- Part of: Marlborough Sounds
- Islands: Arapaoa Island, Allports Island, Blumine Island, Motuara Island, Long Island
- Settlements: Picton

Queen Charlotte Sound / Tōtaranui (Note: Also known as either Queen Charlotte Sound or the Māori name Tōtaranui individually. Prior to 2014, the sound had the recorded name of Queen Charlotte Sound (Totaranui), but no official name.) is the easternmost of the main sounds of the Marlborough Sounds, in New Zealand's South Island. Its original Māori name is after the local tōtara trees.

In 2014, the sound was given the official name of Queen Charlotte Sound / Tōtaranui as part of a Waitangi Tribunal settlement with the Te Āti Awa tribe.

== Geography ==
Like the majority of its neighbours, the sound runs southwest to northeast before joining Cook Strait, which separates the North Island and South Island of New Zealand.

To the east of the sound lie Arapaoa Island and Tory Channel. Interisland ferries use Tory Channel and Queen Charlotte Sound on their journeys between Picton and Wellington in the North Island.

Kenepuru Sound, an arm of Pelorus Sound, lies to the northwest and runs parallel to Queen Charlotte Sound. Some of the small side arms of the two sounds are only hundreds of metres apart, but are separated by a steep serrated range of hills. Not surprisingly, one of the settlements on this stretch of coast is called Portage, named for the simplest method of passing between the two sounds.

The sound is a drowned river valley (or ria).

== Towns and settlements ==
The town of Picton, the northern terminus of the South Island's railway and state highway networks, lies near the head of the sound.

Other settlements are small and isolated—often simply individual properties. Due to the rugged nature of the coast, for many of these access is by boat only.

== History ==
During pre-European and early contact periods, Queen Charlotte Sound was important location for trade between North and South Island Māori, including pakohe (argillite stone) from nearby D'Urville Island, which was used to create toki (adzes). The local population gathered around the waters for its bountiful seafood.

It was from a hill on Arapaoa Island in 1770 that Captain James Cook first saw the sea passage from the Pacific Ocean to the Tasman Sea, which was named Cook Strait. Captain Cook sheltered in Queen Charlotte Sound during each of his three voyages of exploration at various points, and named it after Queen Consort Charlotte of Mecklenburg-Strelitz.

The area was a base for whaling throughout the 19th and early 20th centuries, notably at Perano Head on Arapaoa Island.

Queen Charlotte Sound has calm water and is popular for sailing - a marked contrast to the notorious waters of Cook Strait. Many ships have been wrecked close to the entrance to the Sound, most notably in recent years the Russian cruise liner Mikhail Lermontov, which sank in 1986 in Port Gore after striking rocks. One life was lost in the incident.

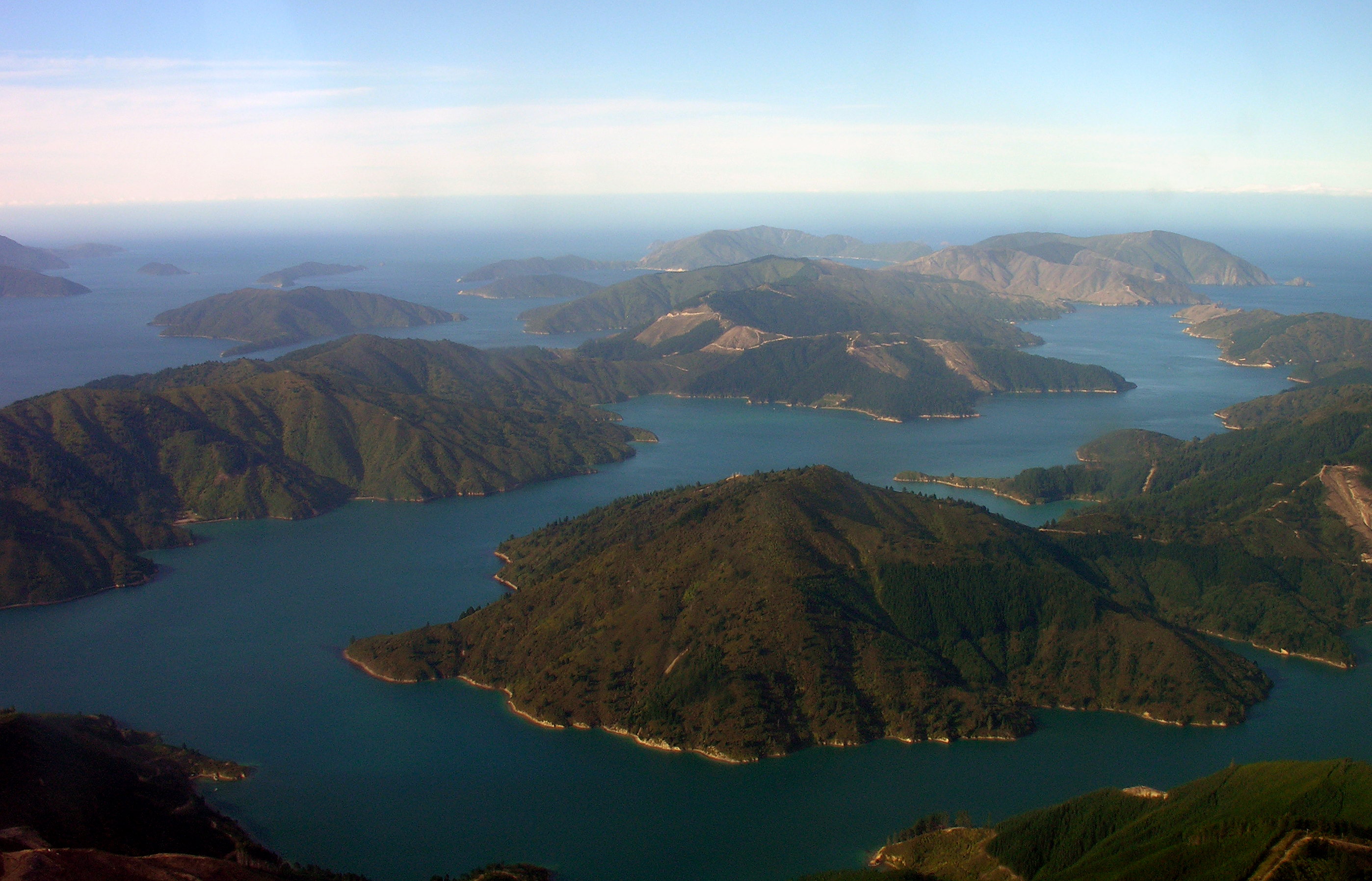
Tory Channel, a major arm of Queen Charlotte Sound

Queen Charlotte Sound entrance

== See also ==
- Allports Island
- Blumine Island
- Long Island
- Motuara Island
- Mabel Island
- Ship Cove (New Zealand), Cook's favourite anchorage in the sound
- List of New Zealand places named by James Cook
