= Whangaokeno / East Island =

Island in New Zealand

Whangaokeno (Māori)
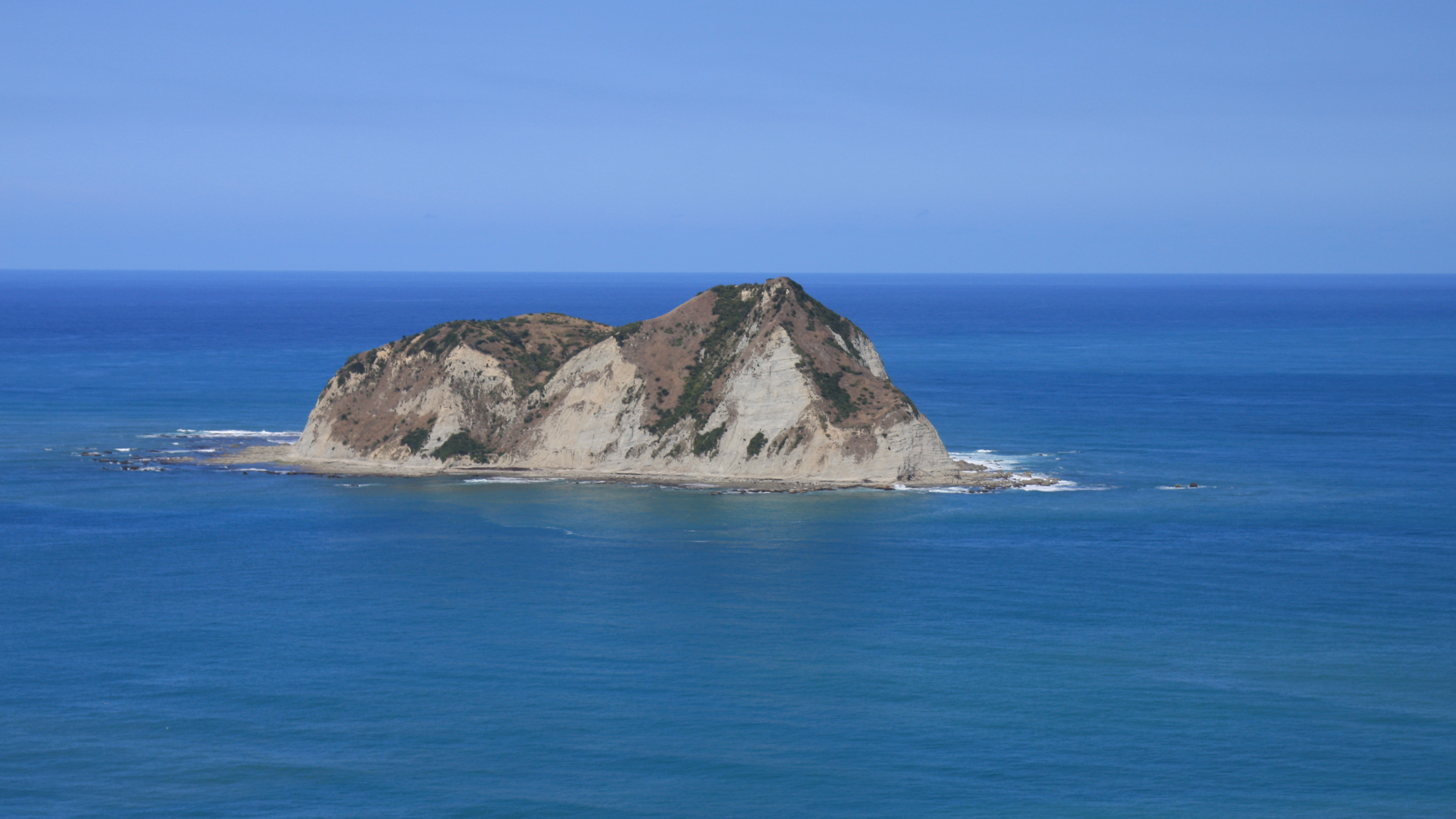
- View of East Island from East Cape
- Interactive map of Whangaokeno / East Island

Geography
- Location: Gisborne Region
- Coordinates: 37°41′28.65″S 178°34′33.10″E
- Area: 13 ha (32 acres)
- Highest elevation: 129 m (423 ft)

Administration
- New Zealand

Demographics
- Population: 0

Whangaokeno / East Island is a small (13-hectare or 32-acre) island approximately 2 km (1.2 mi) east of East Cape in the North Island of New Zealand. Reaching an elevation of 129 m (423 ft), it was the original location for the East Cape Lighthouse, which was built in 1900. However, the island is prone to earthquakes and its steep cliffs cause numerous landslides. By 1920, the danger to the lighthouse was considered great enough to trigger a decision to move the lighthouse to the mainland. In 1922, the lighthouse was extinguished and relocated to its current position.

On 10 June 2019, the name of the island was officially gazetted as Whangaokeno / East Island.

The Takitimu waka landed at Whangaōkena (East Cape).

== Gallery ==
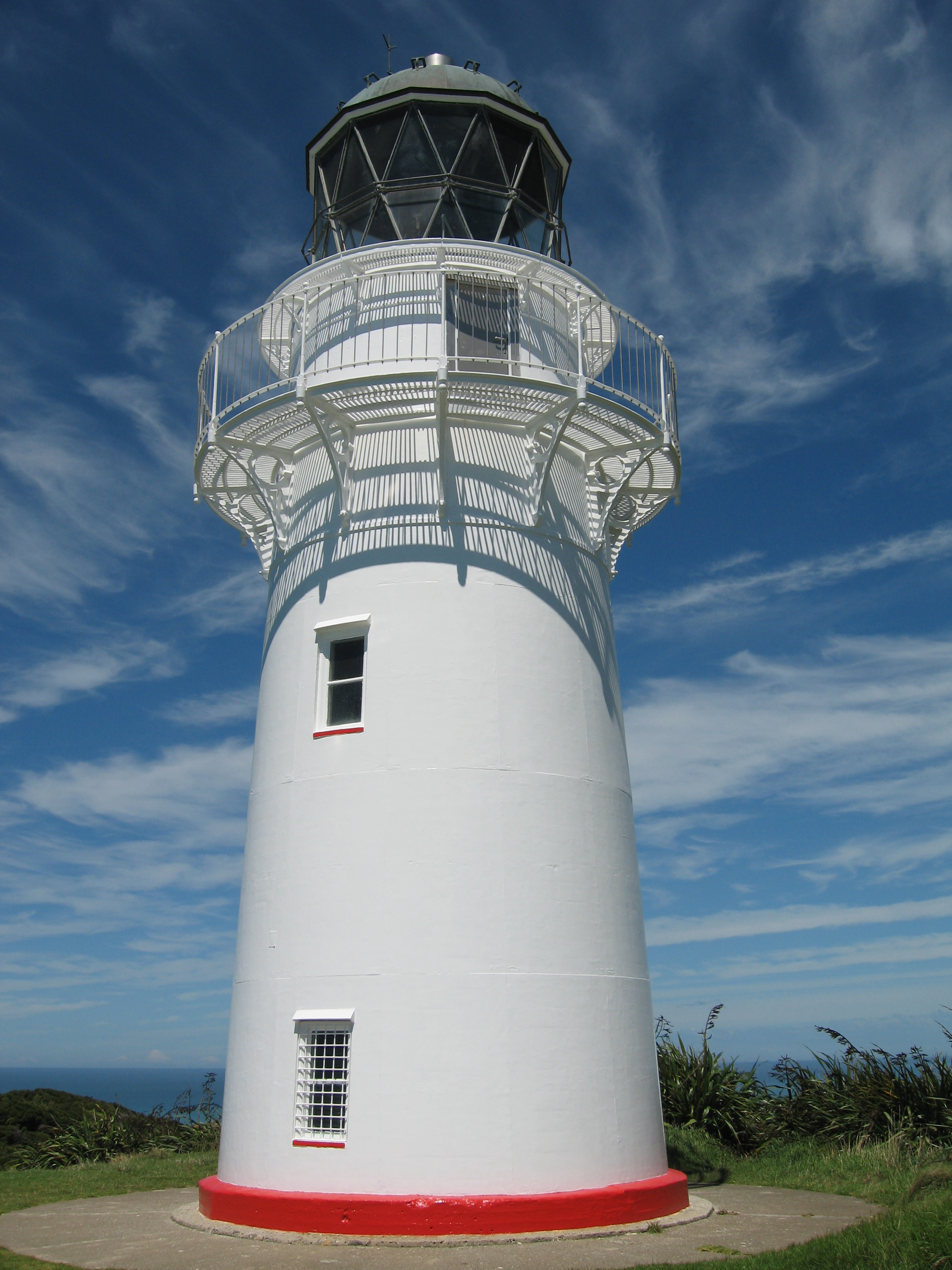
East Island was the original location of the East Cape Lighthouse.

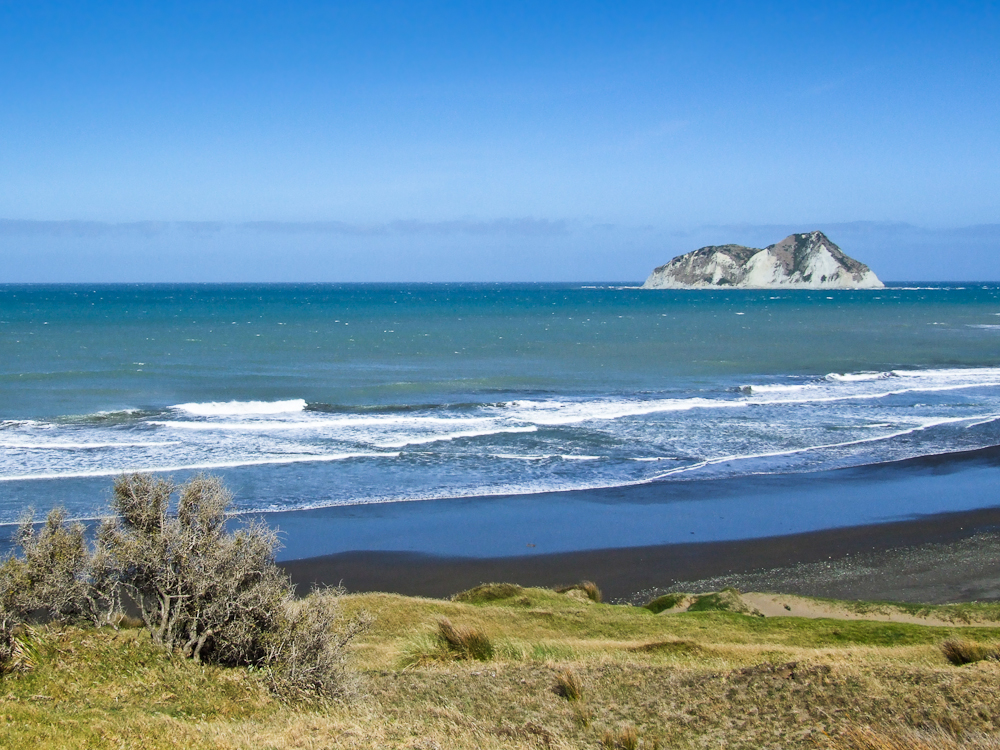
East Island seen from the bottom of the Otiki Hill

== See also ==
- New Zealand outlying islands
- List of islands of New Zealand
- List of islands
- Desert island
