= East Cape =

Coastal location in New Zealand

- Cape
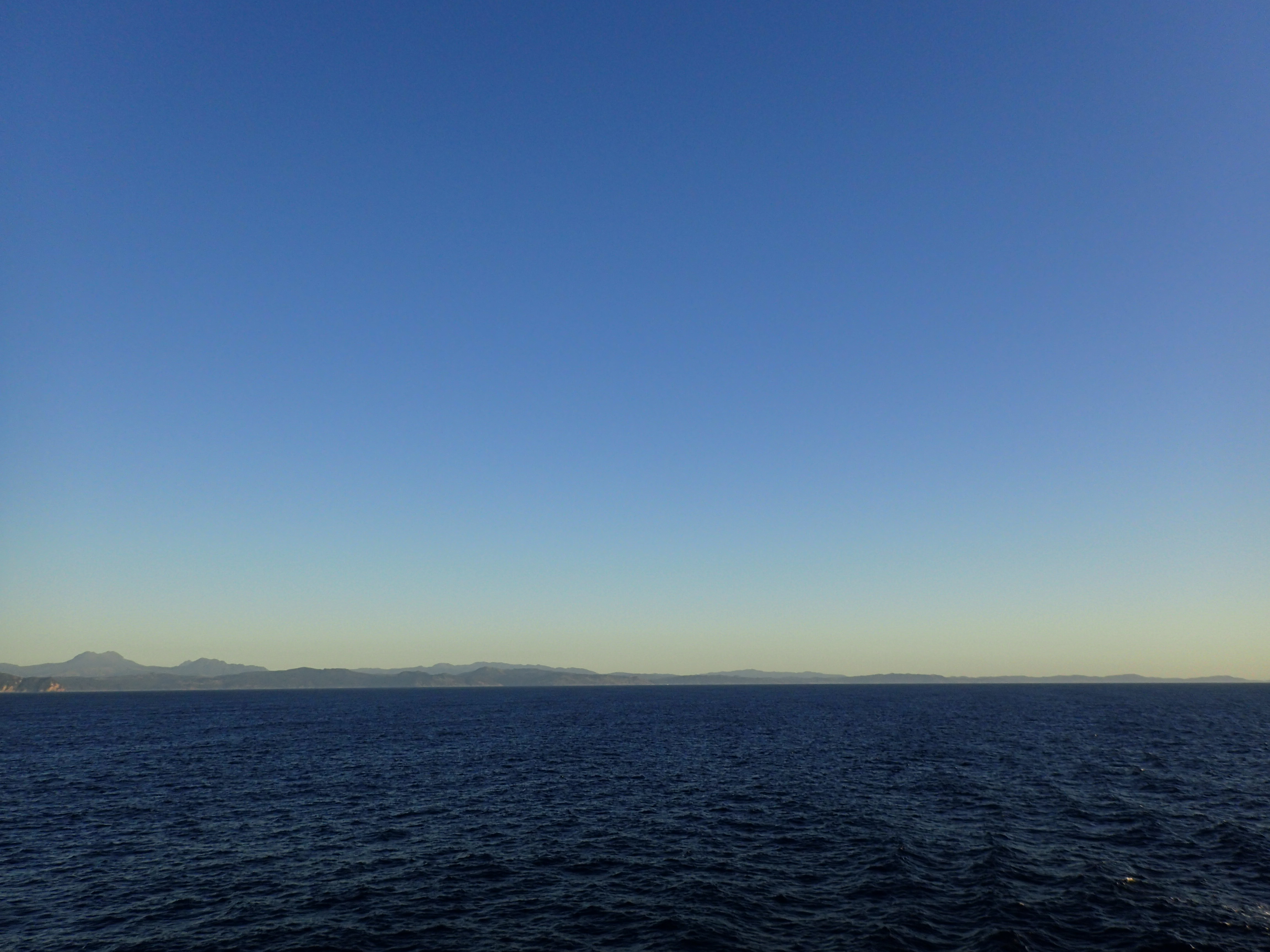
- East Cape on the right hand end of the Raukūmara Range

- Location within New Zealand
- Coordinates: 37.6892°S 178.5483°E
- Location: Gisborne District, New Zealand
- Water bodies: Pacific Ocean

East Cape is the easternmost point of the main islands of New Zealand. It is at the northern end of the Gisborne District of the North Island. East Cape was originally named "Cape East" by British explorer James Cook during his 1769–1779 voyage. It is one of four New Zealand cardinal capes he named, along with North Cape, West Cape and South Cape.

The name "East Cape" is also used for the part of the Gisborne District north of the Poverty Bay area, but more often as a metonym for the whole Gisborne District.

Maritime New Zealand operates the East Cape Lighthouse, located at the cape's easternmost point. The small Whangaokeno / East Island, also known as Motu o Kaiawa, is directly offshore. The NZ Transport Agency upgraded the Horoera Bridge in 2017, giving campervans and other heavy vehicles full access to the lighthouse. It replaced a temporary Bailey bridge installed in 2015.

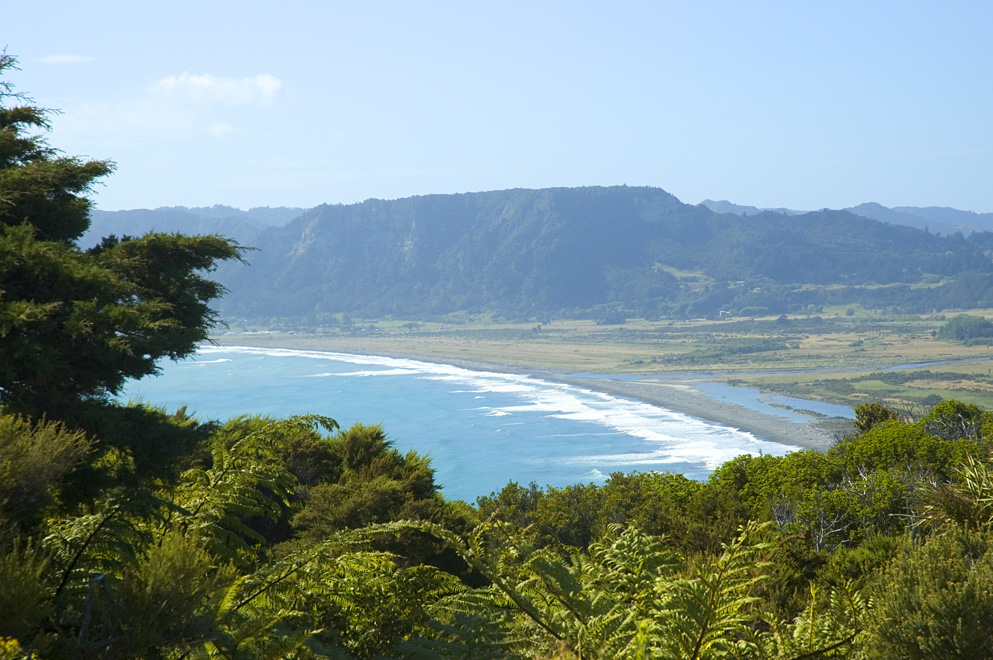
Te Araroa and ranges towards East Cape

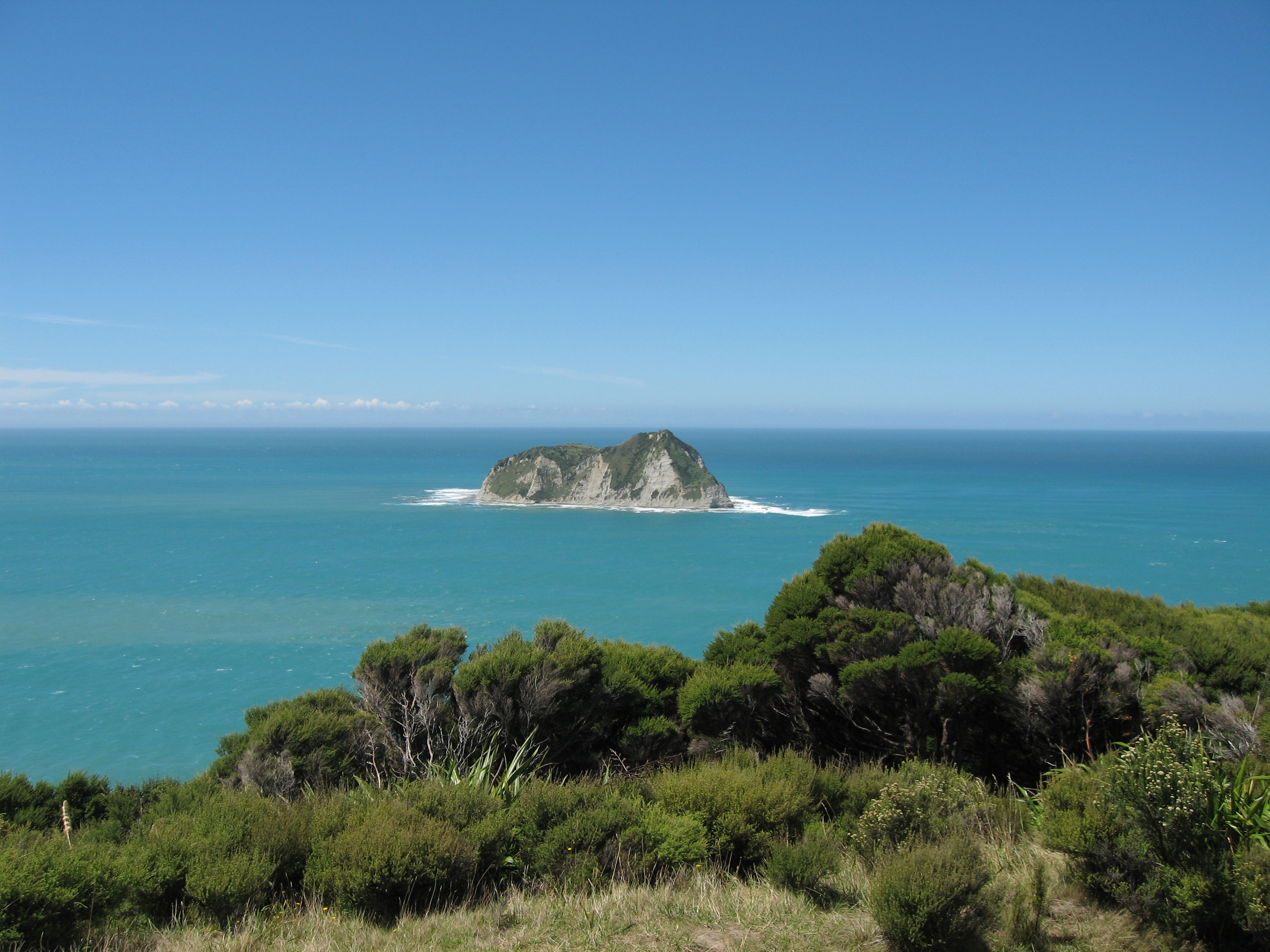
Looking from East Cape towards Whangaokeno / East Island

== Demographics ==
East Cape statistical area, which includes Wharekahika / Hicks Bay, Te Araroa and Tikitiki, covers 991.22 km^{2} (382.71 sq mi) and had an estimated population of 1,540 as of June 2025, with a population density of 1.6 people per km^{2}.

Historical population
| Year | Pop. | ±% p.a. |
|---|---|---|
| 2006 | 1,563 | — |
| 2013 | 1,419 | −1.37% |
| 2018 | 1,389 | −0.43% |
| 2023 | 1,509 | +1.67% |

East Cape had a population of 1,509 in the 2023 New Zealand census, an increase of 120 people (8.6%) since the 2018 census, and an increase of 90 people (6.3%) since the 2013 census. There were 765 males, 741 females, and 3 people of other genders in 492 dwellings. 1.6% of people identified as LGBTIQ+. The median age was 36.9 years (compared with 38.1 years nationally). There were 384 people (25.4%) aged under 15 years, 258 (17.1%) aged 15 to 29, 624 (41.4%) aged 30 to 64, and 240 (15.9%) aged 65 or older.

People could identify as more than one ethnicity. The results were 23.3% European (Pākehā); 91.7% Māori; 2.4% Pasifika; 1.0% Asian; 0.2% Middle Eastern, Latin American and African New Zealanders (MELAA); and 0.4% other, which includes people giving their ethnicity as "New Zealander". English was spoken by 95.0%, Māori by 42.1%, and other languages by 1.4%. No language could be spoken by 2.2% (e.g. too young to talk). New Zealand Sign Language was known by 0.6%. The percentage of people born overseas was 3.0, compared with 28.8% nationally.

Religious affiliations were 33.8% Christian, 4.0% Māori religious beliefs, 0.2% Buddhist, 0.4% New Age, and 0.6% other religions. People who answered that they had no religion were 54.1%, and 7.8% of people did not answer the census question.

Of those at least 15 years old, 120 (10.7%) people had a bachelor's or higher degree, 606 (53.9%) had a post-high school certificate or diploma, and 393 (34.9%) people exclusively held high school qualifications. The median income was $26,700, compared with $41,500 nationally. 33 people (2.9%) earned over $100,000 compared to 12.1% nationally. The employment status of those at least 15 was 378 (33.6%) full-time, 138 (12.3%) part-time, and 75 (6.7%) unemployed.
