= Motuara Island =

Island in New Zealand

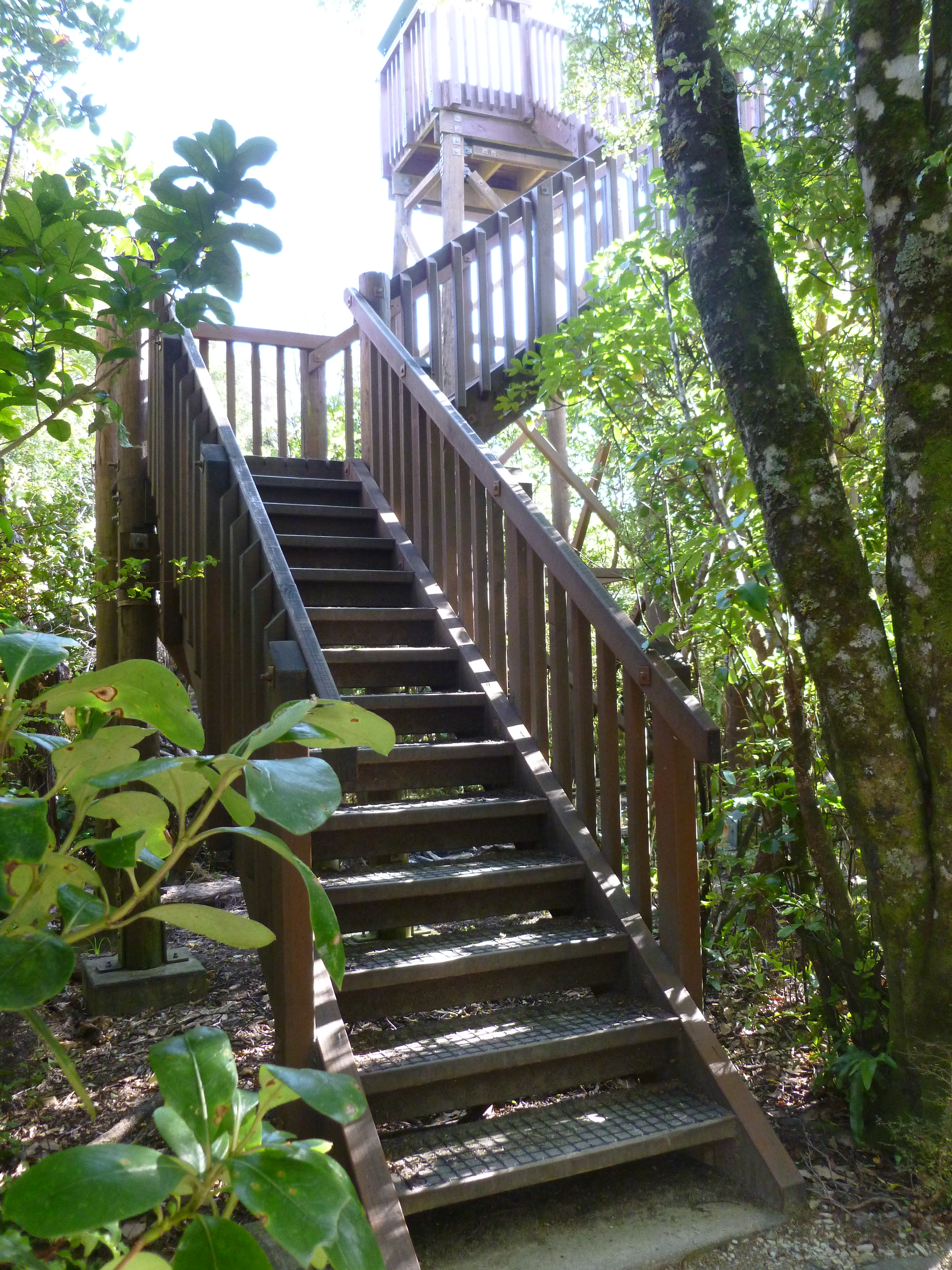
- The wooden lookout tower on the summit of Motuara Island, near to where, in 1770, Captain Cook proclaimed British sovereignty over Queen Charlotte Sound
- Interactive map of Motuara Island

Geography
- Location: Marlborough Sounds
- Coordinates: 41°05.5′S 174°16.5′E
- Highest elevation: 128 m (420 ft)

Administration
- Department of Conservation (New Zealand)

Demographics
- Population: 0

Additional information
- Bird sanctuary

Motuara Island is a scenic and historical reserve that lies at the entrance to Queen Charlotte Sound / Tōtaranui. It is notable for the actions of James Cook. During HMS Endeavour's stay at nearby Meretoto / Ship Cove, Cook climbed to the summit of Motuara, and formally (and controversially) claimed it and the adjacent lands in the name of and for the use of the sovereign of the British Empire.

The island is 59 hectares (150 acres) in size. Motu means island and ara is a path; hence, Motuara literally means the island in the path (of the canoes).

== Māori activity at the time of Cook's visits ==
The entrance to the Queen Charlotte Sound / Tōtaranui area was an important point of arrival and departure for the steady flow of trading waka (canoes) crossing Cook Strait, and Motuara Island was a staging post for people and goods crossing the strait, as well as a trading post for pounamu (jade) and pakohe (argillite).

Rangitāne people resided in kāinga (unfortified villages) near food gathering and growing places. Although the residents enjoyed long periods of peace, due to its strategic location over the years different tribal groups contested, fought and merged there; hence, the fortified pā upon a partly attached rocky islet off the south east point of Motuara Island. Whenever trade opportunities or strife loomed, people gathered at the pā. Today this islet is called Hippah Island, after the early British use of the word "Hippah" for any fortified Māori site. The islets cliffs provided protection in times of skirmishes.

At the time HMS Endeavour sailed into the sound, Motuara's chief was an elderly man named Topaa. He and his people paddled waka out from the pā and encircled the ship. In terms of first contact, it was friendly and prolonged encounter, smoothed by Tupaia, the Tahitian priest and interpreter.

As Cook wrote in his journal:

The inhabitants of this place invited us ashore with their usual Marks of Friendship, and shew'd us all over the place; which indeed was soon done, for it was very small, yet it contain'd a good number of people, and they had in it, Split and hanging up to dry, a prodidgious quantity of various sorts of small fish, a part of which they sold to us for such Trifles as we had about us.

— James Cook, Cook's Journal: Daily Entries,

Writer Stephen Gerard describes the Rangitāne point of view:

And then one morning – it was on the 15 January [1770] – they heard the mournful blare of a conch-shell calling from the island. They abandoned their various pursuits, and launched long canoes, and paddled hurriedly across the sound, and stood to arms, for there they saw a strange ship... and with astonishment perceived their faces to be pale beyond belief... Then suddenly appeared among the white faces one of friendly coffee brown. Cries of astonishment broke from Rangitāne throats. In their own language, but with a strange accent and many unfamiliar words, this man called to them to not be afraid... So they kept the peace, and allowed the white chief Kuka to visit the island pa, and walk freely on their beaches and among their houses, and cut down their trees and take their water.

— Stephen Gerard, Strait of Adventure (1938)

During one of Topaa and Tupaia's conversations, Topaa said his ancestors came from Hawaiki. This is the same place that Tupaia came from.

Cook estimated the population in the Motuara, Ship Cove, Anahou area to number 300 to 400. He wrote:

… they leive desperse'd along the Shore in search of their daly bread which is fish and firn roots for they cultivate not no part of the lands… This people are poor when compared to many we have seen and their Canoes are mean and without orament, the little traffick we had with them was wholy for fish for we saw little else they had to o dispose of, they seem'd to have some knowlidge of Iron for they very readily took Nails in exchange for fish

— James Cook, Cook's Descriptions of Places

== Cook's exploration and claim ==
During Endeavour's stay at nearby Meretoto / Ship Cove, James Cook and his crew explored and charted the sound, including Motuara Island. On 31 January 1770, Cook and his officers erected a flag post on the summit of the island, hoisted the Union Jack, and claimed Queen Charlotte Sound for his king.

Prior to the flag raising ceremony, Cook sought and gained permission from the Topaa and his people to put a mark on the island to prove that the British had been there. Cook's sealed orders from the British Admiralty read:

You are also with the Consent of the Natives to take Possession of Convenient Situations in the Country in the Name of the King of Great Britain: Or: if you find the Country uninhabited take Possession for his Majesty by setting up Proper Marks and Inscriptions, as first discoverers and possessors

— Trent Dalton, Cook's Secret Orders Revealed,

This place was inhabited, and the people did not accept the king as their overlord. The way this act was commemorated on its 150th, 200th, and 250th anniversaries is an illustration of how Cook's legacy in New Zealand has changed over time.

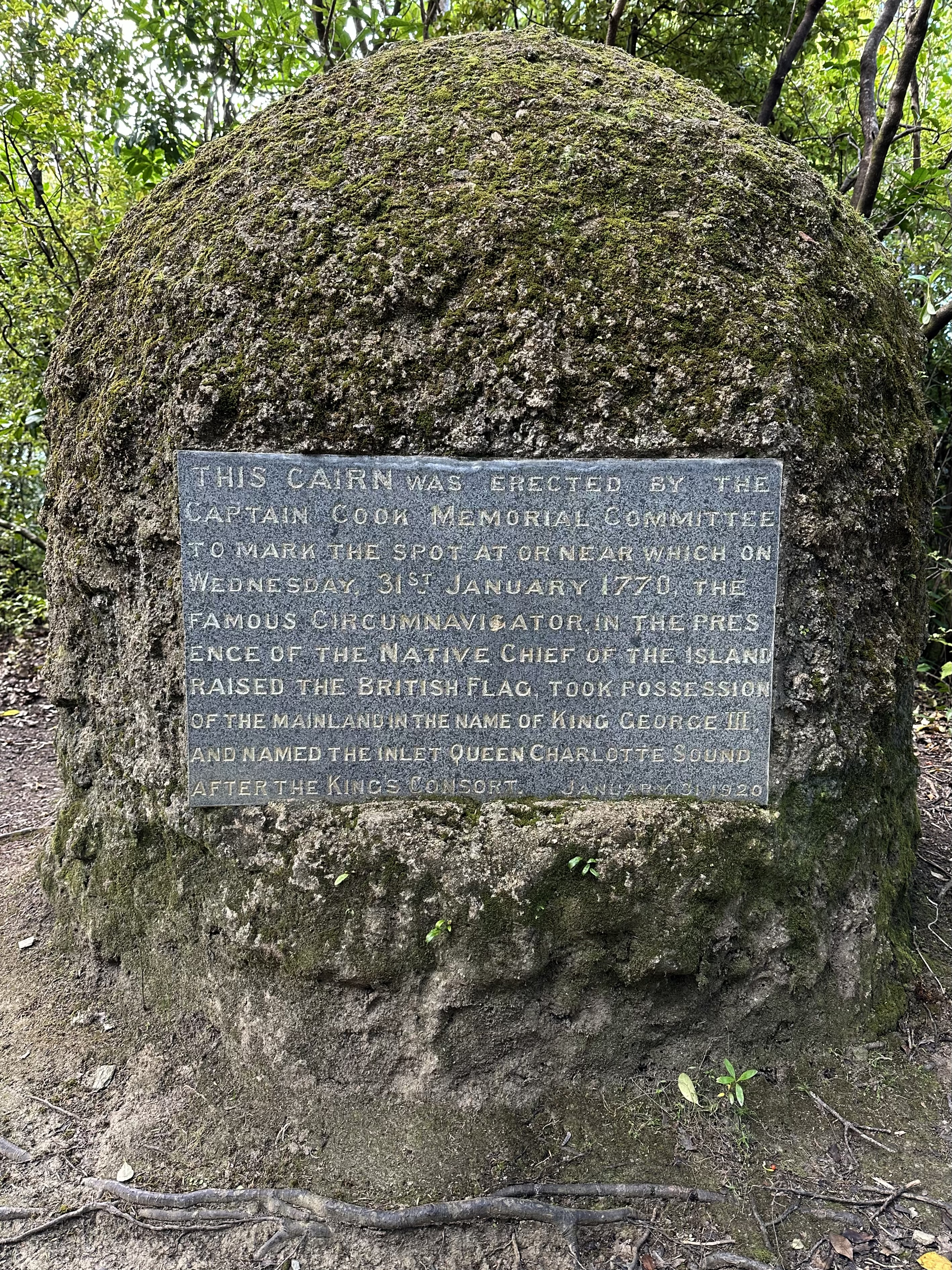
James Cook cairn, Motuara summit

On the 150th anniversary, a cairn was unveiled on the summit by the "Captain Cook Memorial Committee" to mark the occasion. The plaque on the cairn records that:

On 31st January 1770, the famous circumnavigator, in the presence of the native chief of the island raised the British Flag, took possession of the mainland in the name of King George III and named the inlet Queen Charlotte Sound after the King’s consort

Fifty years after that, around the time of the 200th anniversary, working parties from various local clubs built a lookout tower. The platform grants panoramic views over the sound and out to Cook Strait.

Fifty years later, an interpretation panel put up as part of the 250th commemorations – presumably the Department of Conservation (New Zealand) and in consultation with local iwi (tribes) – tells the wider story, acknowledging all peoples "who have travelled to this special place".

After the flag raising ceremony, the party drank a toast to Queen Charlotte's health and gave the empty bottle to Topaa, who, in Cook's words, "was highly pleased". "You have to wonder though", poses the panel, "if Tapaa ever dreamed of what Cook’s actions would eventually mean for his people". It goes on to say that Cook revisited the sound five times. He and other voyagers, such as Fabian von Bellingshausen, used Motuara as a lookout, observatory, signal station and garden.

For the white men came in greater and greater numbers. The invasion had begun that has continued ever since. It was only seventy years later that the chiefs of all the tribes of New Zealand were called upon to sign the Treaty of Waitangi a paper ceding their lands to the whites. But by then the Rangitāne of Motuara were not in a position to care; for the bloody Te Rauparaha had taken their territory from them and a great many of their lives as well.

— Stephen Gerard, Strait of Adventure (1938)

=== Flora and fauna ===
The once abundant native birds and bush-covered hills were much admired by all. Cook's men planted vegetable gardens on Motuara; however, on his return, he noted in his journal:

… we found almost in a state of nature, having been wholly neglected by the inhabitants. Nevertheless, many articles were in a flourishing condition, and shewed how well they liked the soil in which they were planted

— James Cook, A Voyage Towards the South Pole and Round the World Volume 2,

Vegetables were resown by Tobias Furneaux on HMS Adventure after the ship separated from Cook on HMS Resolution. His garden thrived and provided much needed sustenance for the crew of returning ships. Overtime seeds from this garden was spread around New Zealand.

From the mid-1800s, the more vegetation was cleared by people from nearby Anahou to make way for gardens. By the early 1900s much of the remaining vegetation was eaten by quarantined angora goats and over time, by farmed sheep. All stock were removed in 1925, and the island was declared a scenic and historical reserve in 1976. Since rats were eradicated in 1991, the forest has regenerated itself, and today, the island is home to native birds, reptiles and insect, and a crèche for Okarito kiwi chicks. Being pest-free has meant that robin, saddleback, grey warbler, bellbird, tūī and fantail could be reintroduced.

In May 2023, six Okarito kiwi chicks were temporarily rehomed to the island. At 3-months old these chicks are vulnerable to predation from stoat in their native Westland habitat. The project is a collaboration between Willowbank Wildlife Reserve in Christchurch, Department of Conservation, Picton’s E-Ko Tours and local iwi Te Atiawa as part of the Nationwide Operation Nest Egg. The aim is for the chicks to grow up for a year before being re-leased into the wilds of the Ōkārito coastal wetland.

== See also ==
- Desert island
- List of islands
