= Gore Bay, New Zealand =

Bay in the South Island of New Zealand

Gore Bay
- Locality
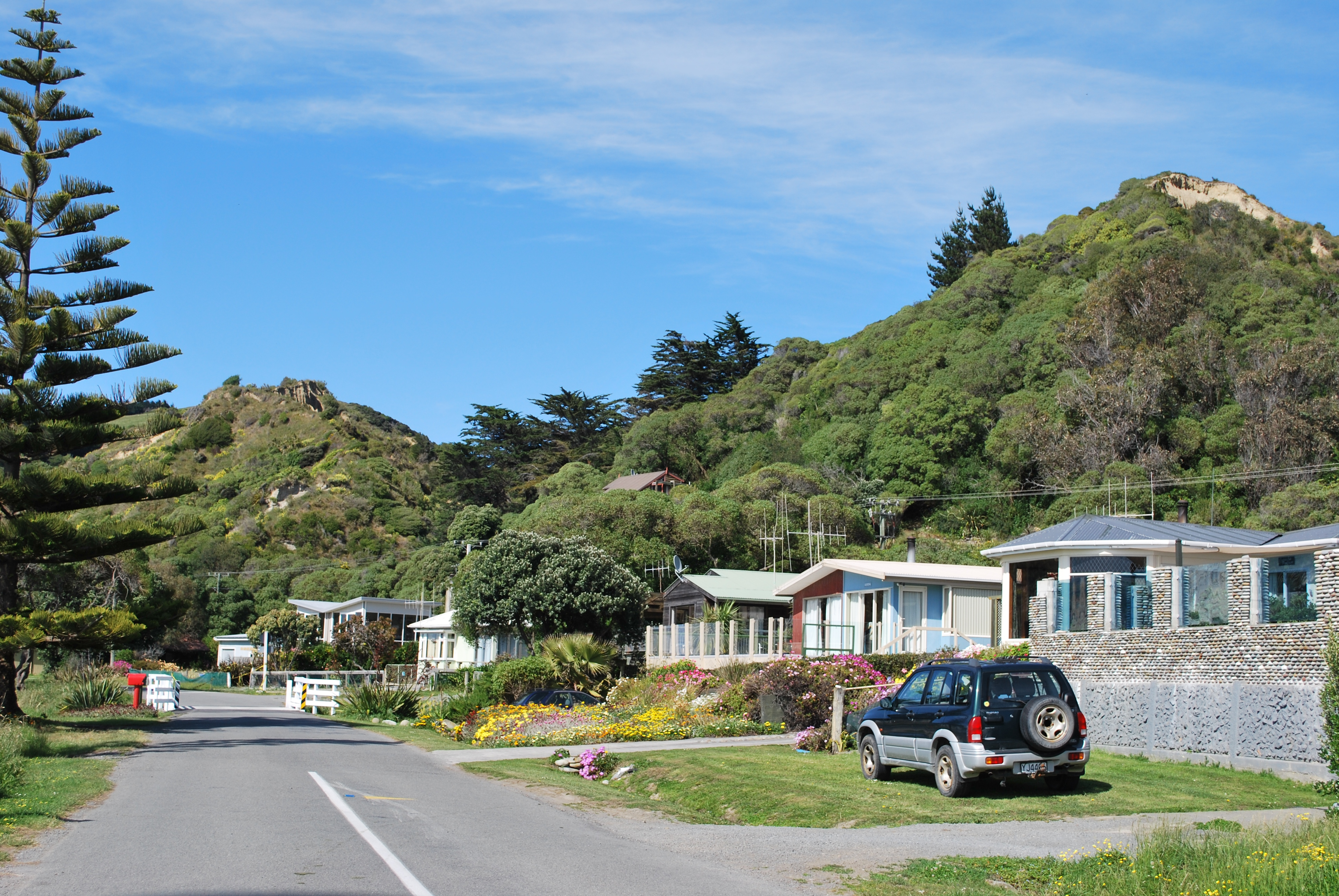
- Houses in Gore Bay
- Interactive map of Gore Bay
- Coordinates: 42°51′31.3″S 173°18′34.3″E
- Country: New Zealand
- Region: Canterbury
- Territorial authority: Hurunui District
- Ward: East Ward
- Electorates: Kaikōura; Te Tai Tonga

Government
  - Territorial Authority: Hurunui District Council
  - Regional council: Environment Canterbury
  - Mayor of Hurunui: Marie Black
  - Kaikoura MP: Stuart Smith
  - Te Tai Tonga MP: Tākuta Ferris

Area
  - Total: 0.34 km^{2} (0.13 sq mi)

Population (June 2025)
  - Total: 10
  - Density: 29/km^{2} (76/sq mi)
- Time zone: UTC+12 (New Zealand Standard Time)
  - Summer (DST): UTC+13 (New Zealand Daylight Time)
- Postcode: 7383

Gore Bay is a coastal settlement about 8 kilometres (5 mi) from Cheviot, New Zealand.

It has a surfing beach with summer beach houses and 14 permanent residents. There are two local camping grounds, each with beach access and businesses. It is a popular New Year's Eve venue. Of note is Cathedral Gully, a spectacular weathered clay canyon.

The cottage at 60 Moody Street that once belonged to Mrs. Eliza Robinson, wife of local runholder William 'Ready Money' Robinson, is registered by Heritage New Zealand as a Category II structure, with registration number 1769.

== Toponymy ==
The Māori name for this place is Pāua pirau meaning decayed pāua.

The place name Gore Bay is not an official name but is a recorded name that is probably derived from Gore's Bay shown on Captain Cook's map of New Zealand as the bay between Banks Island and the southern island, T’avai Poenammoo.

== Demographics ==
Gore Bay covers 0.34 km^{2} (0.13 sq mi) and had an estimated population of 10 as of June 2025, with a population density of 29 people per km^{2}. It is part of the larger Parnassus statistical area.

Historical population
Year	Pop.	±% p.a.
2013	24	—
2018	21	−2.64%
2023	15	−6.51%

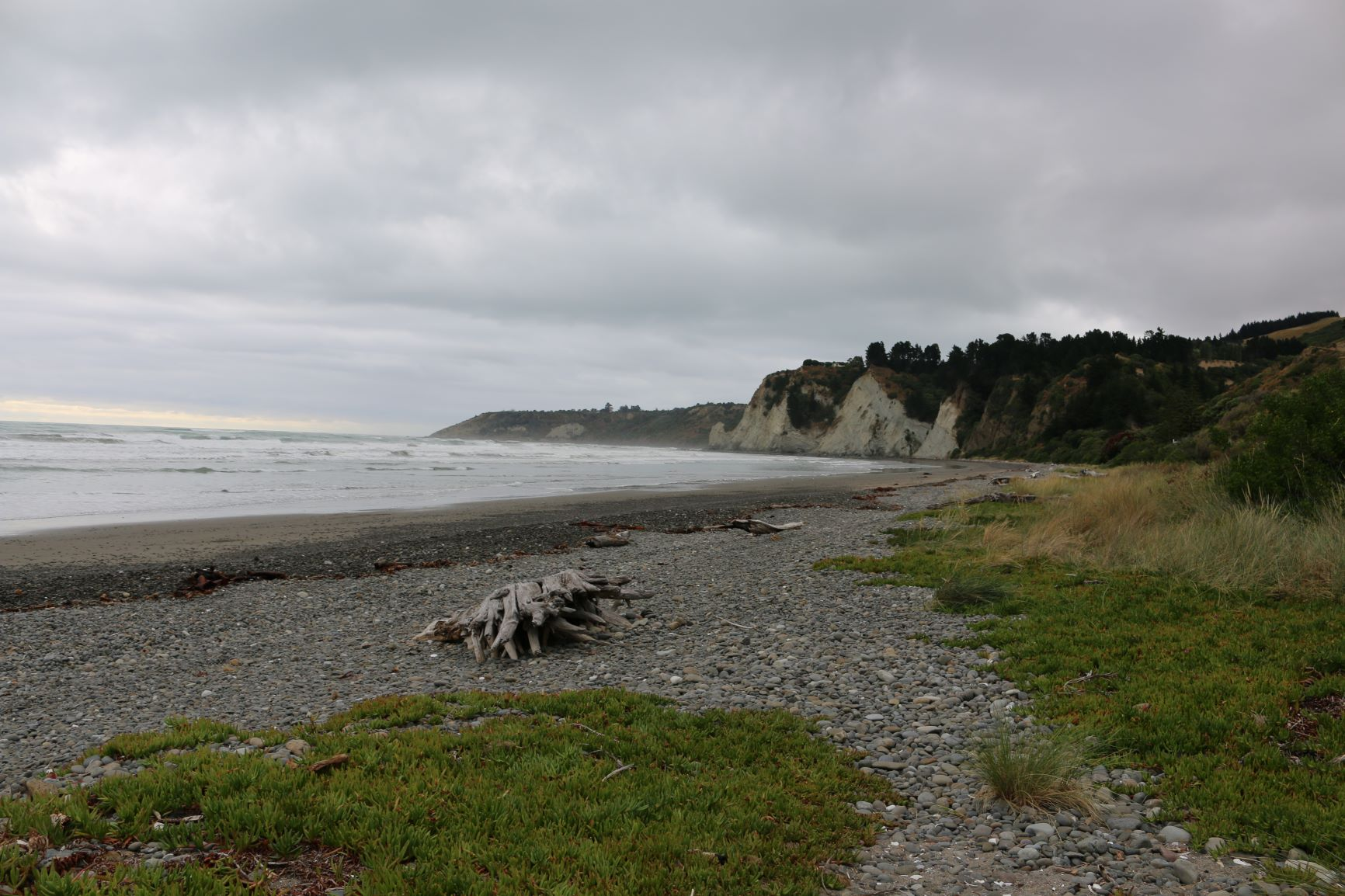
Gore Bay

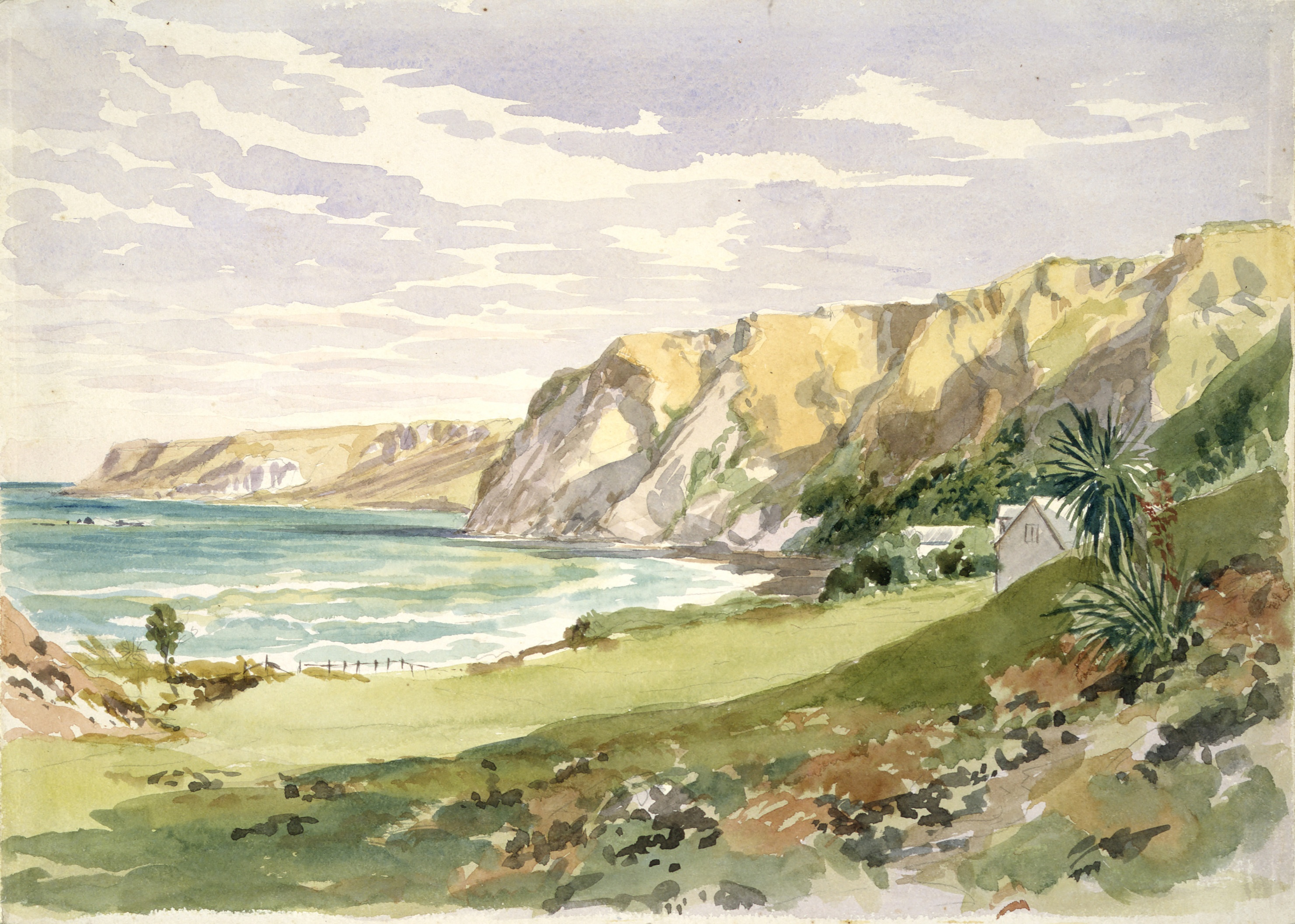
1874 watercolour painting, with Mrs Robinson's cottage behind the cabbage tree

Gore Bay had a population of 15 in the 2023 New Zealand census, a decrease of 6 people (−28.6%) since the 2018 census, and a decrease of 9 people (−37.5%) since the 2013 census. There were 6 males and 9 females in 9 dwellings. The median age was 71.2 years (compared with 38.1 years nationally). There were 3 people (20.0%) aged 30 to 64, and 9 (60.0%) aged 65 or older.

All people identified as European (Pākehā) and all spoke English. None were born overseas.

All people replied to the question on religion that they had no religion.

The median income was $23,600, compared with $41,500 nationally. The employment status of those at least 15 was 3 (20.0%) full-time and 3 (20.0%) part-time.

== Climate ==
Climate data for Gore Bay
Month	Jan	Feb	Mar	Apr	May	Jun	Jul	Aug	Sep	Oct	Nov	Dec	Year
Average precipitation mm (inches)	61.7 (2.43)	57.1 (2.25)	78.4 (3.09)	80.9 (3.19)	82.4 (3.24)	69 (2.7)	81.1 (3.19)	79 (3.1)	53 (2.1)	61.4 (2.42)	64.4 (2.54)	51.8 (2.04)	820.2 (32.29)
Source: Climate Charts
