= South Cape / Whiore =

Headland in New Zealand

South Cape / Whiore Māori: Ōpēhia or Whiore
- Cape
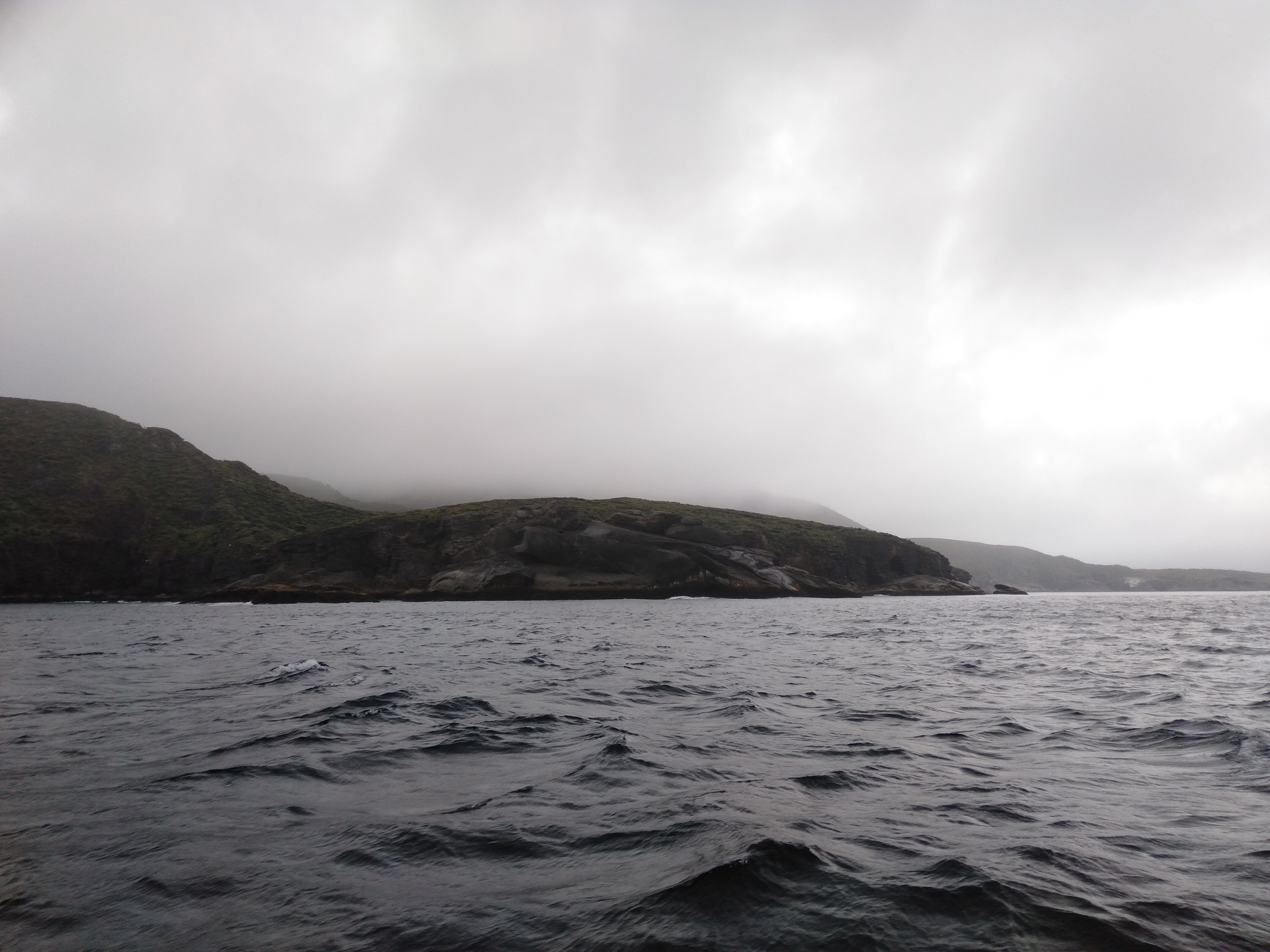
- South Cape / Whiore - The southernmost point of Stewart Island

- Location within New Zealand
- Coordinates: 47°17′24″S 167°32′16″E
- Elevation: 85 m (279 ft)

South Cape / Whiore is a cape marking the southernmost point of Stewart Island, and by extension the main New Zealand archipelago. It is one of the four Cardinal Capes of New Zealand identified by Captain James Cook on his first voyage, along with North Cape, Cape East and West Cape. Cook originally named the place "Cape South". At the time, Cook incorrectly charted the island as a peninsula attached to the South Island of New Zealand, with a narrow isthmus in place of Foveaux Strait. South Cape is also one of the world's five Great Capes, along with capes in South America, Africa, and Australia.

In 1998, South Cape became one of 90 place names to be given a dual name with the passage of the Ngāi Tahu Claims Settlement Act 1998, representing part of a settlement of claims made against the New Zealand government by the Ngāi Tahu iwi for breaches of the Treaty of Waitangi. The new name, South Cape / Whiore, includes a traditional Māori name for the Cape alongside the name given to it by Cook.

== See also ==
- Extreme points of New Zealand
