= Te Hoiere =

Te Hoiere may refer to:

- Te Hoiere (canoe), a voyaging canoe used in the migrations that settled New Zealand.
- Maud Island, an island in the Marlborough Sounds, New Zealand, with the alternative official name Te Hoiere.
- Pelorus River, a river in Marlborough, New Zealand, officially called Te Hoiere / Pelorus River.
- Pelorus Sound / Te Hoiere, a drowned valley in the Marlborough Sounds, New Zealand.
