= List of shipwrecks in 1752 =

The List of shipwrecks in 1752 includes some ships sunk, wrecked or otherwise lost during 1752.

table of contents
← 1751 / 1752 / 1753 →
Jan	Feb	Mar	Apr
May	Jun	Jul	Aug
Sep	Oct	Nov	Dec
Unknown date

== January ==
=== 3 January ===
List of shipwrecks: 7 February 2018
Ship	State	Description
Geldermalsen	Dutch East India Company	The East Indiaman struck a reef and sank in the Lingga Islands, Netherlands East Indies. There were seventeen survivors. She was on a voyage from China to Amsterdam, North Holland.

=== 11 January ===
List of shipwrecks: 56 January 1887
Ship	State	Description
Hunter's Galley	(Kingdom of Great Britain) British America	The ship was wrecked and sank off Bermuda. She was on a voyage from Sint Eustatius to North Carolina.

=== 15 January ===
List of shipwrecks: 15 January 1752
Ship	State	Description
Halifax	Great Britain	The ship was wrecked on Porto Santo Island, Madeira, with the loss of nine of her thirteen crew. She was on a voyage from Lisbon, Portugal, to Philadelphia, Pennsylvania, British America.

=== 16 January ===
List of shipwrecks: 16 January 1752
Ship	State	Description
Anne	Great Britain	The ship was driven ashore in the Bay of Cádiz.
Charm	Great Britain	The ship was driven ashore in the Bay of Cádiz with the loss of all but one of her crew.
Fly	Great Britain	The ship was lost off Cádiz, Spain.
Hannah	Great Britain	The ship was driven ashore in the Bay of Cádiz.
Henry	Great Britain	The ship was driven ashore in the Bay of Cádiz.
John and Thomas	Great Britain	The ship was driven ashore and damaged in the Bay of Cádiz.
Joseph and Mary	Great Britain	The ship was driven ashore capsized in the Bay of Cádiz.
Kitty	Great Britain	The ship was lost in the Bay of Cádiz.
Manchester	Great Britain	The ship was lost in the Bay of Cádiz.
Mary	Great Britain	The ship driven out crewless into the Bay of Cádiz.
Nancy	Great Britain	The ship was lost in the Bay of Cádiz.
Pembrook	Great Britain	The ship was driven ashore in the Bay of Cádiz.
Prince William	Great Britain	The ship foundered in the Bay of Cádiz with the loss of twelve of her crew.
Race Horse	Great Britain	The ship was driven ashore and wrecked in the Bay of Cádiz.
St. John	Great Britain	The ship was lost in the Bay of Cádiz.
St. John Baptist	Great Britain	The ship was lost in the Bay of Cádiz.
Two Maries	Great Britain	The ship was driven ashore in the Bay of Cádiz.
William	Great Britain	The ship was driven ashore in the Bay of Cádiz. She subsequently drove out to sea. William later returned to the bay.

=== 20 January ===
List of shipwrecks: 20 January 1752
Ship	State	Description
Hellena	Great Britain	The ship was lost near "Bervy". Her crew were rescued. She was on a voyage from Camp Veer, Zeeland, Dutch Republic to Aberdeen.

=== 28 January ===
List of shipwrecks: 28 January 1752
Ship	State	Description
Princess Mary	Great Britain	The ship was lost on the Burrough of Avon Sands, in the Bristol Channel with the loss of three lives. She was on a voyage from Cork, Ireland to Bristol, Gloucestershire.

=== Unknown date ===
List of shipwrecks: Unknown date 1752
Ship	State	Description
Anson	Great Britain	The ship was wrecked at Gibraltar before 21 January. She was on a voyage from Newfoundland, British America, to Ancona, Papal States.
Blundell	Great Britain	The ship was lost off Cape Clear Island, County Donegal, Ireland. She was on a voyage from Jamaica to Liverpool, Lancashire.
Charming Polly	(Kingdom of Great Britain) British America	The sloop was lost in the Ocacock Inlet, North Carolina, before 17 January. All on board were rescued. She was on a voyage from Barbados to the Patowmack Canal.
Happy Return	Great Britain	The ship was driven ashore at Sunderland, County Durham, before 17 January.
Happy Nancy	Great Britain	The ship foundered off "Cirilla" with the loss of four of her ten crew. She was on a voyage from "Cirilla" to London.
John	Great Britain	The ship was driven ashore at Sunderland before 17 January.
John and Benjamin	Great Britain	The ship was driven ashore at Sunderland before 17 January.
John and Richard	Great Britain	The ship was lost near Tunis before 21 January with the loss of all but five of her crew. She was on a voyage from "Zant" to Bristol, Gloucestershire.
Meriam	Great Britain	The ship was driven ashore at Sunderland before 17 January. She was on a voyage from Boston, Lincolnshire, to Newcastle upon Tyne, Northumberland.
Simpson	Great Britain	The ship was lost at North Berwick, Berwickshire, before 21 January with the loss of her captain. She was on a voyage from London to Berwick upon Tweed, Northumberland.
Stillington	Great Britain	The ship was lost at Lisbon, Portugal, before 14 January. She was on a voyage from Trani, Kingdom of Sicily, to Lisbon.
Two Brothers	Great Britain	The ship was driven ashore at Sunderland before 17 January.

== February ==
=== 1 February ===
List of shipwrecks: 1 February 1752
Ship	State	Description
Superbe	Spain	The ship was lost off "Cornile", near Cádiz, with the loss of 50 of the 250 people on board. She was on a voyage from Veracruz, Viceroyalty of New Granada, to Cádiz.

=== 17 February ===
List of shipwrecks: 17 February 1752
Ship	State	Description
John and William	Great Britain	The ship was driven ashore and wrecked at the mouth of the Garonne.

=== 18 February ===
List of shipwrecks: 18 February 1752
Ship	State	Description
Florinda	Great Britain	The ship foundered on St Alban's Ledge, in the English Channel off the coast of Dorset. Her crew were rescued.

=== 26 February ===
List of shipwrecks: 26 February 1752
Ship	State	Description
Constance	Great Britain	The ship was driven ashore and wrecked 7 nautical miles (13 km) west of Plymouth, Devon. Her crew were rescued. She was on a voyage from London to Marseille, Bouches-du-Rhone, France

=== Unknown date ===
List of shipwrecks: Unknown date 1752
Ship	State	Description
America	Great Britain	The ship was lost on the Irish coast before 11 February. Her crew were rescued.
Betty	Great Britain	The ship was lost near Larne, County Antrim, Ireland, before 11 February. She was on a voyage from Glasgow, Renfrewshire, to Grain, Kent.
Boneta	Great Britain	The ship was lost on the Irish coast before 25 February. She was on a voyage from Falmouth, Cornwall, to Barcelona, Spain.
Bumper	Great Britain	The ship was lost on the north coast of England. She was on a voyage from Nova Scotia, British America, to Boston, Lincolnshire.
Elizabeth and Martha	Great Britain	The ship was lost near Fowey, Cornwall, before 7 February. Her crew were rescued, She was on a voyage from London to Cork, Ireland.
Endeavour	Ireland	The ship was lost on the Spanish coast before 25 February. She was on a voyage from Waterford to Gibraltar.
Judith	Great Britain	The ship was lost at Galway, Ireland, before 11 February.
May	Great Britain	The ship was driven ashore on the Irish coast.
Neptune	Spanish Navy	The 64-gun Man-of-war foundered off Cádiz before 25 February.
Molly	Great Britain	The ship was wrecked at Seaforth before 24 February. She was on a voyage from North Carolina, British America, to London.
Owner's Goodwill	Great Britain	The ship was lost on the Lincolnshire coast before 7 February. She was on a voyage from Newcastle upon Tyne, Northumberland, to London.
Prince George	Great Britain	The ship was lost off Porto, Portugal, before 25 February. She was on a voyage from South Carolina, British America, to Porto.
Thomas & Betty	Great Britain	The ship was lost off Montrose, Forfarshire, before 25 February. She was on a voyage from Virginia, British America, to Montrose.

== March ==
=== Unknown date ===
List of shipwrecks: Unknown date 1752
Ship	State	Description
Constant James	Great Britain	The ship struck a rock and foundered off the Isle of Wight. Her crew were rescued. She was on a voyage from Portland, Dorset, to Ramsgate, Kent.
Five Brothers	Great Britain	The ship was wrecked on a sandbank off Dunkirk, Nord, France. She was on a voyage from London to Dunkirk.
Goodman	Great Britain	The ship was lost in Dundrum Bay, Ireland. She was on a voyage from Liverpool, Lancashire, to Philadelphia, Pennsylvania, British America.
John and Hannah	Great Britain Isle of Man	The ship was lost at Plymouth, Devon, with the loss of her captain. She was on a voyage from Newbury, British America, to the Isle of Man.
Pelican	Great Britain	The ship was lost near Seaforth. She was on a voyage from Biddiford, Devon, to London.
Pretty Sally	Great Britain	The ship was driven ashore in the River Thames at Gravesend, Kent. She was on a voyage from London to a Spanish port.
Royal Duke	Great Britain	The ship was driven ashore at Sheerness, Kent.
Pretty Sally	Great Britain	The ship was driven ashore in the River Thames at Gravesend. She was on a voyage from London to Maryland, British America.

== April ==
=== 15 April ===
List of shipwrecks: 15 April 1752
Ship	State	Description
Mary	Great Britain	The sloop was driven ashore west of the Old Head of Kinsale, County Cork, Ireland. She was on a voyage from Lisbon, Portugal, to Dublin, Ireland.

=== Unknown date ===
List of shipwrecks: Unknown date 1752
Ship	State	Description
Dolphin	Great Britain	The ship foundered 4 leagues (12 nautical miles (22 km) off Bilbao, Spain. She was on a voyage from Biddiford, Devon, to Bilbao.
Molly	Great Britain	The ship foundered off Biddiford before 17 April. Her crew were rescued. She was on a voyage from Bristol, Gloucestershire, to Cork, Ireland.
Samuel	Great Britain	The ship foundered in the Atlantic Ocean before 14 April. Her crew were rescued by Delawar (Portugal). Samuel was on a voyage from Saint Kitts to London.

== May ==
=== 15 May ===
List of shipwrecks: 15 May 1752
Ship	State	Description
Magdalene	Danzig	The ship was wrecked on a sandbank off Great Yarmouth, Norfolk, Great Britain. Her crew were rescued.

=== Unknown date ===
List of shipwrecks: Unknown date 1752
Ship	State	Description
Indian Prince	Great Britain	The ship was lost on Stout Point, Llantwit, near Nash Sands, in the Bristol Channel. Her crew were rescued. She was on a voyage from Saint Kitts to Bristol, Gloucestershire.
St Philip	France	The ship was lost near Lewes, Sussex, Great Britain. She was on a voyage from the Charente to Dunkirk.

== July ==
=== 6 July ===
List of shipwrecks: 6 July 1752
Ship	State	Description
Elizabeth and Johanna	Dutch Republic	The ship was driven ashore and wrecked on the Isle of Portland, Dorset, Kingdom of Great Britain. She was on a voyage from Curaçao to Amsterdam, North Holland.

=== 20 July ===
List of shipwrecks: 20 July 1752
Ship	State	Description
Katherine	Great Britain	The ship was run down and sunk in the Atlantic Ocean 90 leagues (270 nautical miles (500 km) off Vigo, Spain, by a Dutch vessel. Her crew survived.

=== 30 July ===
List of shipwrecks: 30 July 1752
Ship	State	Description
Caronna	Great Britain	The brigantine struck the Runnel Stone. She put into Penzance Bay, where she capsized. Her crew were rescued by local fishing boats. Caronna was on a voyage from North Carolina, British America, to London.

== August ==
=== 9 August ===
List of shipwrecks: 9 August 1752
Ship	State	Description
Primrose	Great Britain	The ship ran aground and was wrecked on an island 20 leagues (60 nautical miles (110 km) off Narva, Russia. She was on a voyage from Narva to London.

=== Unknown date ===
List of shipwrecks: Unknown date 1752
Ship	State	Description
Bland	Great Britain	The ship sank at North Shields, County Durham. She was refloated in October and subsequently repaired.
Daniel	(Kingdom of Great Britain) Guernsey	The ship was lost on the coast of Cornwall. Her crew were rescued. She was on a voyage from Milford Haven, Pembrokeshire, to Guernsey.
Elizabeth	Great Britain	The ship was lost.
Endeavour	Great Britain	The ship was driven ashore in the Bristol Channel with the loss of all but her captain.
Esther	Great Britain	The ship was driven ashore and wrecked east of St Ives, Cornwall. Her crew were rescued.
Friendship	Great Britain	The ship was lost in the Bristol Channel. Her crew were rescued.
Judith	Great Britain	The ship foundered in the North Sea. Her crew were rescued. She was on a voyage from King's Lynn, Norfolk, to London.
La Ferme	France	The ship ran aground on the Goodwin Sands. She subsequently refloated and was driven ashore at Ramsgate, Kent, Great Britain. La Ferme was later refloated and taken in to Ramsgate.
Lilley	Great Britain	The ship was lost in the Bristol Channel with the loss of two of her crew.
Mary & Susannah	Great Britain	The ship was lost in the Bristol Channel.
Naps & Jeffery	Great Britain	The ship foundered in the Bristol Channel. Her crew were rescued.
Nightingale	Great Britain	The ship was destroyed by fire off Land's End, Cornwall. Her crew were rescued. She was on a voyage from Biddiford, Devon, to Maryland, British America.
Satisfaction	Great Britain	The ship foundered in the Bristol Channel. Her crew were rescued.
Suspension of Arms	France	The brigantine was driven ashore crewless and wrecked east of Rye, Sussex, Great Britain.
Two Brothers	Great Britain	The ship was driven ashore and wrecked west of St Ives with the loss of a crew member. She was on a voyage from Drogheda, County Louth, Ireland to London.
Two Friends	Great Britain	The ship was lost in the Bristol Channel with the loss of all hands.
Unity	Great Britain	The ship was lost on the coast of Cornwall with the loss of all hands. She was on a voyage from Padstow, Cornwall, to London.
William & John	Great Britain	The ship was lost on the coast of Cornwall. Her crew were rescued. She was on a voyage from Milford Haven to Sandwich, Kent.

== September ==
=== 15 September ===
List of shipwrecks: 15 September 1752
Ship	State	Description
Balderly	(Kingdom of Great Britain) British America	The ship was driven ashore in a hurricane at Charles Town, South Carolina.
Baulk	Great Britain	The ship was driven ashore in a hurricane at Charles Town.
Charming Nancy	Great Britain	The ship was driven ashore in a hurricane at Charles Town.
Dove	Great Britain	The ship was driven ashore in a hurricane at Charles Town.
Elizabeth	Great Britain	The ship was driven ashore in a hurricane at Charles Town.
Endeavour	Great Britain	The ship was driven ashore in a hurricane at Charles Town.
Industry	(Kingdom of Great Britain) British America	Captain Brown's ship was driven ashore in a hurricane at Charles Town.
Henry	(Kingdom of Great Britain) British America	The ship was driven ashore in a hurricane at Charles Town.
Industry	Great Britain	The ship was driven ashore in a hurricane at Charles Town.
Katherine	(Kingdom of Great Britain) British America	The ship was driven ashore in a hurricane at Charles Town.
Lucy	(Kingdom of Great Britain) British America	The ship was driven ashore in a hurricane at Charles Town.
HMS Mermaid	(Kingdom of Great Britain) Royal Navy	The sixth rate was driven ashore in a hurricane at Charles Town.
Nancy	Great Britain	The ship was driven ashore in a hurricane at Charles Town.
Peggy and Sally	(Kingdom of Great Britain) British America	The ship was driven ashore in a hurricane at Charles Town.
Polly	Great Britain	The ship was driven ashore in a hurricane at Charles Town.
Susanna	(Kingdom of Great Britain) British America	The ship was driven ashore in a hurricane at Charles Town.
Two Friends	Great Britain	The ship was driven ashore in a hurricane at Charles Town.
Upton	Great Britain	The ship was driven ashore in a hurricane at Charles Town.

=== 17 September ===
List of shipwrecks: 17 September 1752
Ship	State	Description
Phebe	Great Britain	The ship was lost on the Easternmost Key. She was on a voyage from Liverpool, Lancashire, to Jamaica.

=== 22 September ===
List of shipwrecks: 22 September 1752
Ship	State	Description
Success	Great Britain	The ship foundered in the English Channel off Dover, Kent. Her crew were rescued. She was on a voyage from Saint Petersburg, Russia, to Bilbao, Spain.

=== Unknown date ===
List of shipwrecks: Unknown date 1752
Ship	State	Description
Fortune	Great Britain	The ship capsized at A Coruña, Spain. She was declared a total loss.
Katherina Bergatta	(Denmark) Norway	The ship was lost in the Bristol Channel before 15 September. She was on a voyage from Bristol, Gloucestershire, Great Britain, to Fredrikstad.
Lilly	Great Britain	The ship was lost in Bude Bay before 15 September. She was on a voyage from Virginia, British America, to Bristol.
Margaret	Great Britain	The ship foundered off Padstow, Cornwall, before 15 September with the loss of all hands. She was on a voyage from Bristol to Guernsey, Channel Islands.
Neptune	Great Britain	The ship was lost in the Bristol Channel before 19 September. She was on a voyage from Carmarthen to London.
Plymouth Merchant	Great Britain	The ship was lost in the Bristol Channel before 15 September. She was on a voyage from Bristol to Plymouth, Devon.
Santa Maria	France	The ship foundered off Guernsey before 15 September with the loss of five of her crew. She was on a voyage from a Norwegian port to Bordeaux, Gironde.
Speedwell	Great Britain	The ship foundered in a hurricane. She was on a voyage from Jamaica to Philadelphia, Pennsylvania, British America.
Squirrel	(Kingdom of Great Britain) Jersey	The ship was lost in the Bristol Channel before 15 September.
Three Brothers	Great Britain	The ship was lost in Bude Bay before 15 September. She was on a voyage from Bristol to Bayonne, Pyrénées-Atlantiques, France.
Two Sisters	Great Britain	The ship was lost before 15 September.
Wilmington	Great Britain	The ship was lost off St. Ives, Cornwall, before 15 September with the loss of all but two of her crew. She was on a voyage from Falmouth, Cornwall, to Milford Haven, Pembrokeshire.

== October ==
=== 4 October ===
List of shipwrecks: 4 October 1752
Ship	State	Description
Three Sisters	Great Britain	The ship foundered in the Irish Sea off Wexford, Ireland. There were four of five survivors. She was on a voyage from Cork, Ireland, to London.

=== 23 October ===
List of shipwrecks: 23 October 1752
Ship	State	Description
Alexander	Great Britain	The ship foundered in the Gulf of Florida during a hurricane. She was on a voyage from Jamaica to London.
Boston	(Kingdom of Great Britain) British America	The ship was reported missing following a hurricane in the Gulf of Florida on 22–23 October. She was on a voyage from Jamaica to Boston, Massachusetts.
Dolphin	Great Britain	The ship foundered in the Gulf of Florida during a hurricane. She was on a voyage from Jamaica to Liverpool, Lancashire.
Kingston	(Kingdom of Great Britain) British America	The ship was reported missing following a hurricane in the Gulf of Florida on 22–23 October. She was on a voyage from Jamaica to Philadelphia, Pennsylvania.
Lancaster	Great Britain	The ship foundered in the Gulf of Florida during a hurricane. She was on a voyage from Jamaica to Lancaster, Lancashire.
May	Great Britain	The ship foundered in the Gulf of Florida during a hurricane. She was on a voyage from Jamaica to Glasgow, Renfrewshire.
Mary and Priscilla	Great Britain	The ship was reported missing following a hurricane in the Gulf of Florida on 22–23 October. She was on a voyage from Jamaica to London.
Phillis	Great Britain	The ship was foundered during a hurricane in the Gulf of Florida with the loss of seven of her crew. She was on a voyage from Jamaica to London.
Pompey	Great Britain	The ship was reported missing following a hurricane in the Gulf of Florida on 22–23 October. She was on a voyage from Jamaica to London.
Queen Anne	Great Britain	The ship foundered in the Gulf of Florida during a hurricane. She was on a voyage from Jamaica to Bristol, Gloucestershire.
Rhode Island	(Kingdom of Great Britain) British America	The ship foundered in the Gulf of Florida during a hurricane. She was on a voyage from Jamaica to New York.
Statia	(Kingdom of Great Britain) British America	The ship foundered in the Gulf of Florida during a hurricane. She was on a voyage from British Honduras to Rhode Island.
Three Friends	Great Britain	The ship was reported missing following a hurricane in the Gulf of Florida on 22–23 October. She was on a voyage from Jamaica to Bristol.

=== 24 October ===
List of shipwrecks: 24 October 1752
Ship	State	Description
St. Kitts Packet	Great Britain	The ship was lost at Ockacoke, North Carolina, British America.

=== 28 October ===
List of shipwrecks: 28 October 1752
Ship	State	Description
Triton	Great Britain	The ship foundered in the Atlantic Ocean 100 leagues (300 nautical miles (560 km)) off Madeira. Her crew were rescued by Charming Martha (Great Britain). Triton was on a voyage from London to Philadelphia, Pennsylvania, British America.

=== 31 October ===
List of shipwrecks: 31 October 1752
Ship	State	Description
Justitia	Sweden	The ship was lost on the Molsand, off Gothenburg with the loss of all but two of her crew. She was on a voyage from Liverpool, Lancashire, Great Britain, to Gothenburg.

=== Unknown date ===
List of shipwrecks: Unknown date 1752
Ship	State	Description
Constantine	Great Britain	The ship was lost before 20 October. Her crew were rescued. She was on a voyage from Gothenburg, Sweden, to Bristol, Gloucestershire.
Willoughby	Great Britain	The ship was lost near Dunleary, County Dublin, Ireland with the loss of most of her crew. She was on a voyage from Liverpool, Lancashire, to Cork, Ireland.

== November ==
=== 2 November ===
List of shipwrecks: 2 November 1752
Ship	State	Description
Kingston	Great Britain	The ship foundered in the Gulf of Florida. Her crew were rescued. She was on a voyage from Jamaica to London.
Mary & Priscilla	Great Britain	The ship foundered in the Gulf of Florida. Her crew were rescued. She was on a voyage from Jamaica to London.

=== 10 November ===
List of shipwrecks: 10 November 1752
Ship	State	Description
Wiltshire	Great Britain	The ship capsized at Ratcliff, London. She was a total loss.

=== 15 November ===
List of shipwrecks: 15 November 1752
Ship	State	Description
Mary	Great Britain	The ship was wrecked at the "Kirk of Stains", Scotland with the loss of all but two of her crew.

=== 19 November ===
List of shipwrecks: 19 November 1752
Ship	State	Description
El Lebrel	France	The ship was destroyed by fire at Alicante, Spain.

=== Unknown date ===
List of shipwrecks: Unknown date 1752
Ship	State	Description
Anne	Sweden	The ship foundered in the "East Sea" with the loss of all hands. She was on a voyage from Gothenburg to Dunkirk, Nord, France.
Griffin	Great Britain	The ship was driven ashore in the Orkney Islands before 14 November. She was on a voyage from Newcastle upon Tyne, Northumberland, to New England, British America.
Katherine	Dutch Republic	The ship foundered in the English Channel off the Isle of Wight, Great Britain, before 17 November. Her crew were rescued. She was on a voyage from Cádiz, Spain, to Amsterdam, North Holland.
Lucy	Great Britain	The ship sprang a leak and foundered in the North Sea before 7 November. Her crew were rescued by Katherine (Great Britain). Lucy was on a voyage from Cape Fear to Hull, Yorkshire.
Margaretta	France	The ship was driven ashore east of Newhaven, Sussex, Great Britain, before 14 November. She was on a voyage from the river Charente to Rouen, Normandy.
Polly	Great Britain	The snow was driven ashore in Sandwich Bay, Kent, before 14 November and was abandoned by her crew. She was on a voyage from Virginia, British America, to London. Polly was later refloated and taken in to Ramsgate, Kent.
Rainbow	Great Britain	The ship was wrecked at Chester, Cheshire, before 10 November with the loss of all but four of her crew. She was on a voyage from North Carolina, British America, to Liverpool, Lancashire.

== December ==
=== 2 December ===
List of shipwrecks: 2 December 1752
Ship	State	Description
Polly	Great Britain	The ship was wrecked whilst on a voyage from Rhode Island, British America, to Jamaica.

=== 23 December ===
List of shipwrecks: 23 December 1752
Ship	State	Description
Freeman	Great Britain	The ship foundered in the English Channel off Dungeness, Kent, with the loss of all but two of her crew. She was on a voyage from Hull, Yorkshire, to Lisbon, Portugal.

=== 24 December ===
List of shipwrecks: 24 December 1752
Ship	State	Description
Portsmouth	(Kingdom of Great Britain) British America	The brigantine foundered in the Atlantic Ocean. Her captain was the only survivor of her ten crew; he was rescued by Elizabeth (Great Britain). Portsmouth was on a voyage from the Piscataqua River to Louisbourg, Nova Scotia.

=== Unknown date ===
List of shipwrecks: Unknown date 1752
Ship	State	Description
Adventurous Friend	Great Britain	The ship was lost whilst on a voyage from Saint Petersburg, Russia, to London.
Boyne	Great Britain	The ship was driven ashore in Cardigan Bay before 12 December. She was on a voyage from Virginia, British America, to Liverpool, Lancashire.
Charming Peggy	(Kingdom of Great Britain) British America	The ship was lost off Sandy Hook, New Jersey, before 11 December. Her crew were rescued.
Delight	Great Britain	The ship was driven ashore on the coast of Suffolk. She was on a voyage from Rotterdam, South Holland, Dutch Republic to London.
Endraght	Electorate of Hanover	The ship was lost before 15 December. HJer crew were rescued. She was on a voyage from London to Emden.
Lydia	Great Britain	The ship was lost on the Crow Rock, in the Bristol Channel off Milford Haven, Pembrokeshire, before 12 December. Her crew were rescued. She was on a voyage from Swansea, Glamorgan, to Dublin, Ireland.
Maria Gertruida	Dutch Republic	The ship foundered off the Irish coast before 22 December. She was on a voyage from Cádiz, Spain, to London.
Prince William	Great Britain	The ship foundered in the Atlantic Ocean off Land's End, Cornwall, before 15 December. Her crew were rescued. She was on a voyage from Swansea, Glamorgan, to Topsham, Devon.
Prince William	Great Britain	The ship was lost at Providence, Rhode Island, Britiag America. Her crew were rescued.
Richmond	Great Britain	The ship was lost on the Portuguese coast before 12 December. Her crew were rescued.
Stra	Dutch Republic	The galley was driven ashore on Texel, North Holland, before 29 December.
Thistle	Great Britain	The ship was driven ashore at Rye, Sussex, before 19 December. She was on a voyage from Virginia, British America, to London
Thomas and William	Great Britain	The ship was driven ashore near "Camin". She was on a voyage from Saint Petersburg to London.
Union	Great Britain	The ship was driven ashore on Texel before 29 December.
Wilhelmina	Denmark	The ship was driven ashore and wrecked on Skagen before 15 December. Her crew were rescued. She was on a voyage from Saint Thomas, Virgin Islands to Copenhagen.
William	Great Britain	The ship was lost near "Yolland" before 15 December with the loss of four of her crew. She was on a voyage from Great Yarmouth, Norfolk, to Bremen.

== Unknown date ==
List of shipwrecks: Unknown date 1752
Ship	State	Description
Amelia	Great Britain	The ship was lost on the coast of Carolina, British America, before 17 April. Her crew were rescued. She was on a voyage from North Carolina, British America, to London.
Bennett	Great Britain	The ship was destroyed by fire at Charleston, South Carolina, British America, before 19 June.
Betty	Great Britain	The ship was lost in the Adriatic Sea off "St. Angelo", Papal States before 11 February. She was on a voyage from Great Yarmouth, Norfolk, to Venice.
Crown'd Princess	Denmark	The ship was lost in Mussel Bay, Cape of Good Hope. She was on a voyage from "Tranquehar" to Copenhagen.
Duke of Cumberland	Great Britain	The ship was lost off the east coast of British America before 15 December. She was on a voyage from Boston, Massachusetts, to the Piscataqua River, Maine.
Dumb Eagle	Great Britain	The ship foundered off Cuba before 8 May. Her crew were rescued. She was on a voyage from the Bay of Honduras to a port in the north of England.
Elizabeth	Great Britain	The ship sank at Fogo Island, British America, before 21 November.
Esperance	Spain	The ship was wrecked on the coast of Brazil with the loss of all but her captain.
Hellena and Matilda	Portugal	The ship was wrecked at Lisbon with the loss of all but one of her crew. She was on a voyage from Lisbon to Amsterdam, North Holland, Dutch Republic.
Indian Prince	Great Britain	The ship was driven ashore at Stout Point, Llantwit Major, Glamorgan, where she was plundered by the local inhabitants.
Jane	Great Britain	The ship was lost off the coast of South Carolina, British America, before 25 February. She was on a voyage from Antigua to South Carolina.
Katherine	Great Britain	The ship foundered in the Atlantic Ocean. She was on a voyage from London to North Carolina.
Lord Duplin	Great Britain	The ship was wrecked on the Hogsty Reef before 21 August. All on board were rescued by an American sloop. She was on a voyage from Jamaica to Liverpool, Lancashire.
Mariana	Portugal	The ship was lost on the Barbary Coast before 17 July. She was on a voyage from Trani, Kingdom of Sicily, to Lisbon.
Marlborough	Great Britain	African slave trade: The ship was wrecked with the loss of all but two of her crew after being taken by the slaves on board.
Merry Jacks	Great Britain	The whaler was sunk in ice off Greenland before 10 July.
Neptune	Great Britain	The whaler was lost in ice off Greenland before 28 July. Her crew were rescued.
Nuestra Señora de la Luz	Spain	The ship foundered off Montevideo, Viceroyalty of Peru with the loss of all but one of her crew. She was on a voyage from Buenos Aires to Cádiz.
Patty	(Kingdom of Great Britain) Jersey	The ship was abandoned in the Grand Banks of Newfoundland before 5 December. Her crew were rescued. She was on a voyage from Jersey to Newfoundland, British America.
Peggy and Nancy	Great Britain	The ship was lost on the coast of Virginia, British America, before 22 December. Her crew were rescued. She was on a voyage from Maryland, British America, to London.
Pompey	Great Britain	The ship foundered in the Gulf of Florida. She was on a voyage from Jamaica to London.
Prince	(Kingdom of France) French East India Company	The ship caught fire, exploded and sank off the coast of Brazil. Of over 400 people on board, there were eight survivors. She was on a voyage from Port L'Orient, Morbihan to Pondicherry, French India.
Prince Charles	Ireland	The ship was lost off Barbuda before 7 July. She was on a voyage from Dublin to Jamaica.
Retero	Spain	The ship was lost at "Cape Catoncha" before 7 February. She was on a voyage from Cádiz to Veracruz, Viceroyalty of New Granada.
Revolution	Great Britain	The whaler was lost in ice off Greenland before 14 July.
St. Kitt's Merchant	Great Britain	The ship was lost before 14 December whilst on a voyage from Saint Kitts to North Carolina. Her crew were rescued.
Sword Fish	Great Britain	The whaler was lost in ice off Greenland before 14 July.
