= Pelorus Jack =

Dolphin famous for meeting and escorting ships

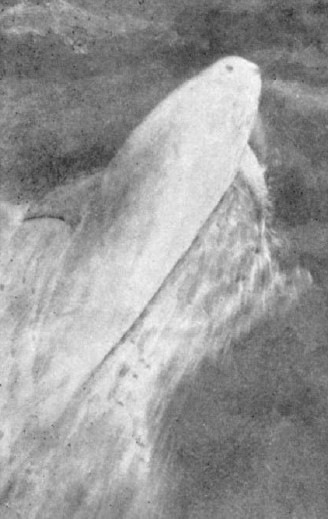
- Pelorus Jack in 1909
- Species: Risso's dolphin
- Years active: 1888–1912
- Known for: Escorting ships through the Marlborough Sounds
- Appearance: White colour with grey lines or shadings; round, white head

Location of the Marlborough Sounds

Pelorus Jack (/pəˈlɔːrəs/; fl. 1888 – April 1912) was a Risso's dolphin (Grampus griseus) who was famous for accompanying ships as they passed through New Zealand's Marlborough Sounds, on the route between Wellington and Nelson. He would meet Nelson-bound ships at the entrance to Pelorus Sound (hence his name) and would continue with them as far as French Pass, a notoriously dangerous channel lying between D'Urville Island and the South Island. With Wellington-bound ships he would make the same journey in reverse.

Sightings of Pelorus Jack were reported over a 24-year period, from 1888 until his disappearance in 1912. His popularity was such that the New Zealand Government issued an Order in Council providing for his protection in 1904, prompted by an incident in which someone shot at him from a passing ship.

== Appearance ==
The dolphin was approximately four metres (13 ft) long and was white in colour, with grey lines or shadings and a round, white head. Although its sex was never determined, it was identified from photographs as a Risso's dolphin, Grampus griseus. This is an uncommon species in New Zealand waters, only 12 having been reported.

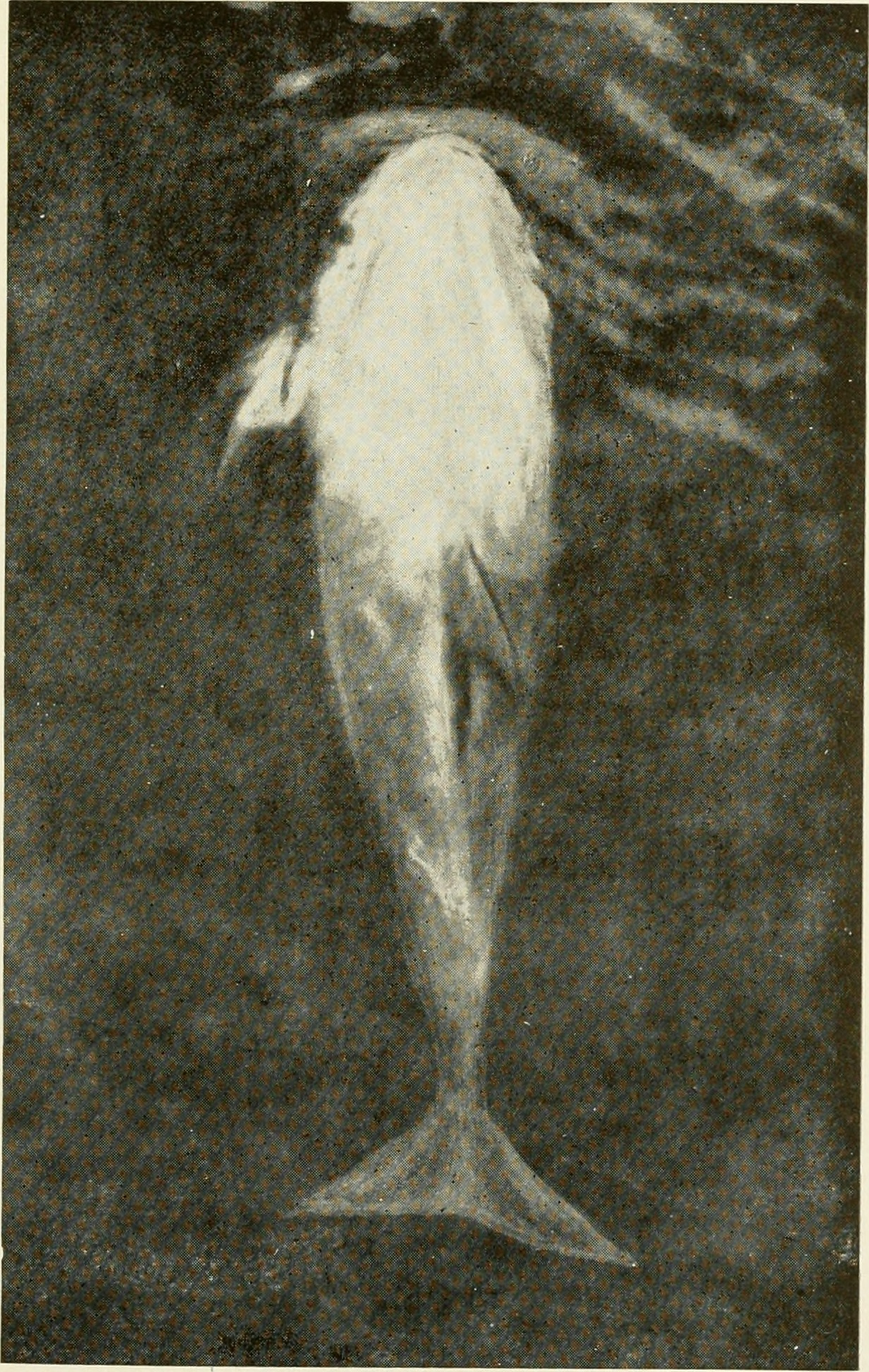
Pelorus Jack. Photographed by A. Pitt.

== History ==
Pelorus Jack was first seen around 1888 when he appeared in front of the schooner Brindle as she approached French Pass. When members of the crew saw the dolphin bobbing up and down in front of the ship, they wanted to kill him, but the captain's wife talked them out of it. To their amazement, the dolphin then proceeded to guide the ship through the narrow channel. For years thereafter, he safely guided almost every ship that came by. With rocks and strong currents, the area is dangerous to ships, but no shipwrecks occurred when Jack was present.

Many sailors and travellers saw Pelorus Jack, and he was mentioned in local newspapers and depicted in postcards.

Jack was last seen in April 1912. There were various rumours connected to his disappearance, including fears that foreign whalers might have harpooned him. However, research suggests that Pelorus Jack was an old animal; his head was white and his body pale, both indications of age, so it is likely that he died of natural causes.

Since 1989, the Interislander ferry service has used Pelorus Jack as a symbol, incorporating him into the livery of its ships.

A statue of Pelorus Jack was unveiled at French Pass in 2016.

=== Shooting incident ===
In 1904, someone aboard the SS Penguin tried to shoot Pelorus Jack with a rifle. Despite the attempt on his life, Pelorus Jack continued to help ships. According to folklore, however, he no longer helped the Penguin, which was shipwrecked in Cook Strait in 1909.

=== Protection ===
Following the shooting incident, a law was proposed to protect Pelorus Jack. He became protected by Order in Council under the Sea Fisheries Act on 26 September 1904. Pelorus Jack remained protected by that law until his disappearance in 1912. It is believed that he was the first individual sea creature protected by law in any country.

== Cultural references ==
- In 1945, when Bob Lowry founded his new press, Pelorus Press, in Auckland, his printer's device was a dolphin, referencing 16th-century Venetian printer Aldus Manutius, and he named the press after Pelorus Jack. "It was a happy thought to maintain the old dolphin tradition. What more inevitable then ... than Pelorus Jack of the Sounds?"
- Kipa Hemi Whiro, a kaumātua of Ngāti Kuia is reported in 1913 as being "very positive in his belief" that Pelorus Jack was "the self-same fish of ancient days", Kaikai-a-waro, a sea-god or taniwha who had guided his ancestor Matua-hautere across Cook Strait from the North Island to settle in the South Island many generations earlier.
- "Pelorus Jack" is a Scottish country dance, named in honour of the dolphin. This dance features a set of alternating tandem half-reels (or heys) where two people act as one but swap who leads at the reel ends. It is also known as a Dolphin Reel.
- Arthur Ransome mentions Pelorus Jack as accompanying ships and receiving protection in his 1932 novel Peter Duck. However, the character of Peter Duck incorrectly locates the dolphin as living in Sydney Harbour.
- The story of Pelorus Jack is (with some changes) recounted in the 1960's Boris Karloff Tales of Mystery anthology comic series.
- Singer/songwriter Andrea Prodan tells the tale of the dolphin in the song "Pelorus Jack" on his 1996 all-vocal record Viva Voce.
- Two bulldogs, named Pelorus Jack I (1913–1916) and Pelorus Jack II (1916–1919), served as mascots of HMS New Zealand, the battlecruiser that the New Zealand government paid to have built for the Royal Navy.
- The Cornish poet, broadcaster and teacher Charles Causley (1917–2003) retells the story of Pelorus Jack in a 44-line, traditionally crafted poem titled "Pelorus Jack" in his Collected Poems 1951–2000.

== See also ==
- Opo (dolphin)
- Moko (dolphin)
- Fungie
- List of individual cetaceans

== Further references ==
- Ross E Hutchins and Jerome P Connolly – The saga of Pelorus Jack (1971)
- Edmund Lindop and Jane Carlson – Pelorus Jack (1964)
