= Elaine Bay =

Bay in New Zealand

- Town
- Interactive map of Elaine Bay
- Coordinates: 41°03′S 173°47′E
- Region: Marlborough
- Ward: Marlborough Sounds General Ward; Marlborough Māori Ward
- Electorates: Kaikōura; Te Tai Tonga (Māori)

Government
  - Territorial Authority: Marlborough District Council
  - Marlborough District Mayor: Nadine Taylor
  - Kaikōura MP: Stuart Smith
  - Te Tai Tonga MP: Tākuta Ferris

Elaine Bay is a bay located in Pelorus Sound / Te Hoiere, within the Marlborough Sounds at the north end of the South Island of New Zealand. Elaine Bay is in the Tawhitinui Reach (a branch of the main section of Pelorus Sound / Te Hoiere), which includes other bays such as Tennyson Inlet, Fitzroy Bay and Hallum Cove. The bay is accessed by the Elaine Bay Road, which connects with the Croisilles-French Pass Road at the top of the ridge.

== Demographics ==
Elaine Bay and its surrounds, which include French Bay and Bulwer, New Zealand and which surrounds but does not include Ōkiwi Bay, covers 190.75 km^{2} (73.65 sq mi). It is part of the larger Marlborough Sounds West statistical area.

Historical population for Elaine Bay and its surrounds
Year	Pop.	±% p.a.
2006	159	—
2013	114	−4.64%
2018	96	−3.38%
2023	99	+0.62%

The area had a population of 99 in the 2023 New Zealand census, an increase of 3 people (3.1%) since the 2018 census, and a decrease of 15 people (−13.2%) since the 2013 census. There were 60 males and 39 females in 66 dwellings. 3.0% of people identified as LGBTIQ+. The median age was 66.3 years (compared with 38.1 years nationally). There were 6 people (6.1%) aged under 15 years, none aged 15 to 29, 36 (36.4%) aged 30 to 64, and 54 (54.5%) aged 65 or older.

People could identify as more than one ethnicity. The results were 90.9% European (Pākehā), 15.2% Māori, and 3.0% Asian. English was spoken by 100.0%, and other languages by 6.1%. The percentage of people born overseas was 15.2, compared with 28.8% nationally.

Religious affiliations were 30.3% Christian, and 3.0% other religions. People who answered that they had no religion were 60.6%, and 12.1% of people did not answer the census question.

Of those at least 15 years old, 12 (12.9%) people had a bachelor's or higher degree, 45 (48.4%) had a post-high school certificate or diploma, and 33 (35.5%) people exclusively held high school qualifications. The median income was $25,400, compared with $41,500 nationally. 3 people (3.2%) earned over $100,000 compared to 12.1% nationally. The employment status of those at least 15 was 18 (19.4%) full-time, 15 (16.1%) part-time, and 3 (3.2%) unemployed.

== Attractions ==
There is a Department of Conservation Campsite situated right on the water's edge. The beach in Elaine Bay is mostly rocky, with some small patches of gravel. Despite this, it is popular for swimming, as it has multiple wharfs and a swimming platform. All of these structures are maintained by Elaine Bay Aquaculture. There are also a couple of walking tracks: the Piwakawaka Track, which is an easy hour and a half return and goes around to the next bay which has a beach; and the Archer Track, which is 4 hours return and connects Elaine Bay to Penzance Bay via a wide track. There are also sea kayaks available for hire within the bay.

Elaine Bay is fed by a number of streams which creates a very rich ecosystem. Schools of fish such as herrings, kahawai and mackerel are found in great numbers. There are also a large number of birds, including cormorants (known as shags) and weka. This diversity of wildlife, typical of the Marlborough Sounds, provides a rich fishing environment. There is also a boat ramp, moorings and small dock.

== Industry ==
Elaine Bay hosts a small fishing and aquaculture port. Many smaller fishing vessels and large mussel boats regularly dock at the port. The main product is green lipped mussels, for which Pelorus Sound / Te Hoiere and its main port Havelock are famous. Many of the surrounding bays contain mussel farms, which are a large employer for the region. There is also a small forestry industry in Elaine Bay. Since the 1970s, areas of Pelorus have a planted in exotic pine forest for timber. The Archer Track goes through some of this logging forest.

== Access ==
The bay is accessed by the Elaine Bay Road, which is off Croisilles-French Pass Road. This road connects to State Highway 6, and the turn off is just north of Rai Valley. The road is paved all the way through to Elaine Bay, because of the trucks regularly accessing the Port.

== Settlement ==
Apart from a few permanent residents, the settlement at Elaine Bay consists mostly of baches, small holiday homes.

== Education ==
A school opened at Elaine Bay in 1906 and was extant in 1914.

There was a school at Fitzroy Bay from 1914 to 1920 and one at Oneiti from 1921 to 1923.
