= Bulwer, New Zealand =

Bulwer
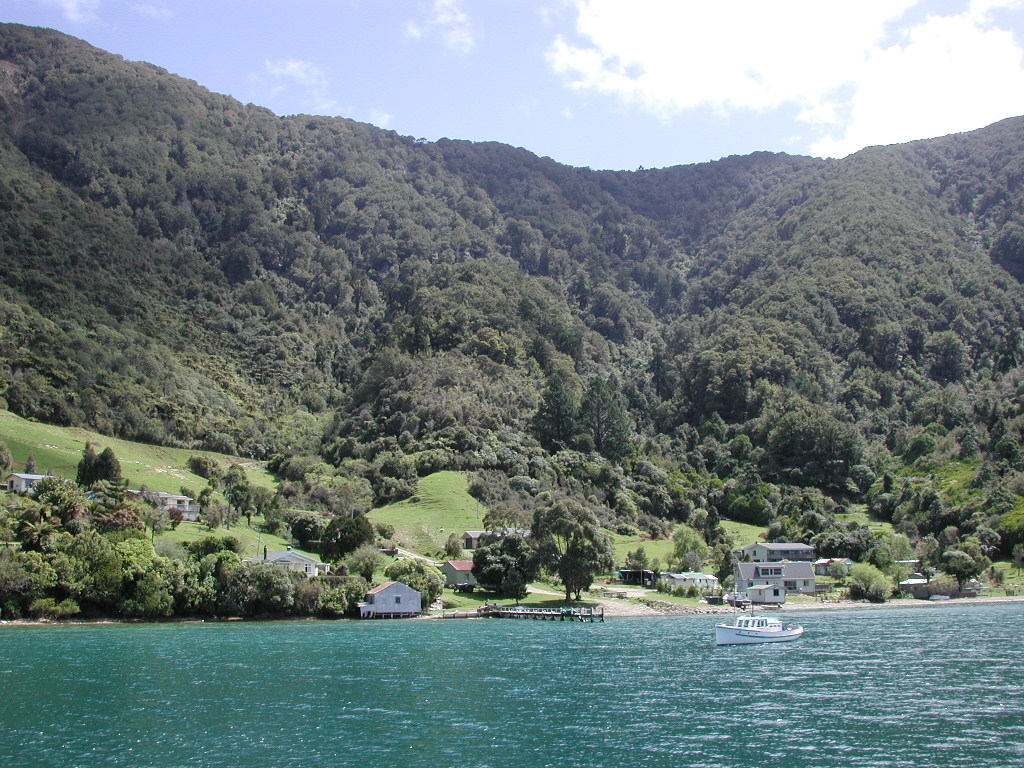

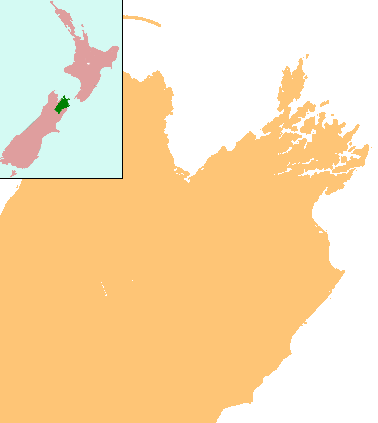
- Location within New Zealand Marlborough
- Coordinates: 40°56′30″S 173°56′59″E
- Country: New Zealand
- Region: Marlborough

Bulwer is a small locality in Waihinau Bay in the outer Pelorus Sound / Te Hoiere, New Zealand. It can be reached by 77 km of winding, mostly unsealed, road from Rai Valley. A weekly mail boat service delivers mail and also offers passenger services.

The area surrounding Bulwer features a mixture of native bush, farm land and pine plantations.

== Naming ==
"Bulwer" and the associated name "Lytton Water" honour either Edward Bulwer-Lytton (1803–1873) or his son Edward Robert Lytton Bulwer-Lytton, 1st Earl of Lytton (1831–1891).

== Demographics ==
Demographics for the area are covered at Elaine Bay#Demographics.

== Education ==
Bulmer School opened in 1905, and closed in 1977.

There was a school at Waitātā Bay from 1905 to at least 1912, one at Puketea Bay from 1911 until at least 1931 and one at Huritini from 1913 to 1940.
