= Penzance Bay =

Bay located in Tennyson Inlet, New Zealand

Coordinates: 41°05′14.73″S 173°45′59.26″E

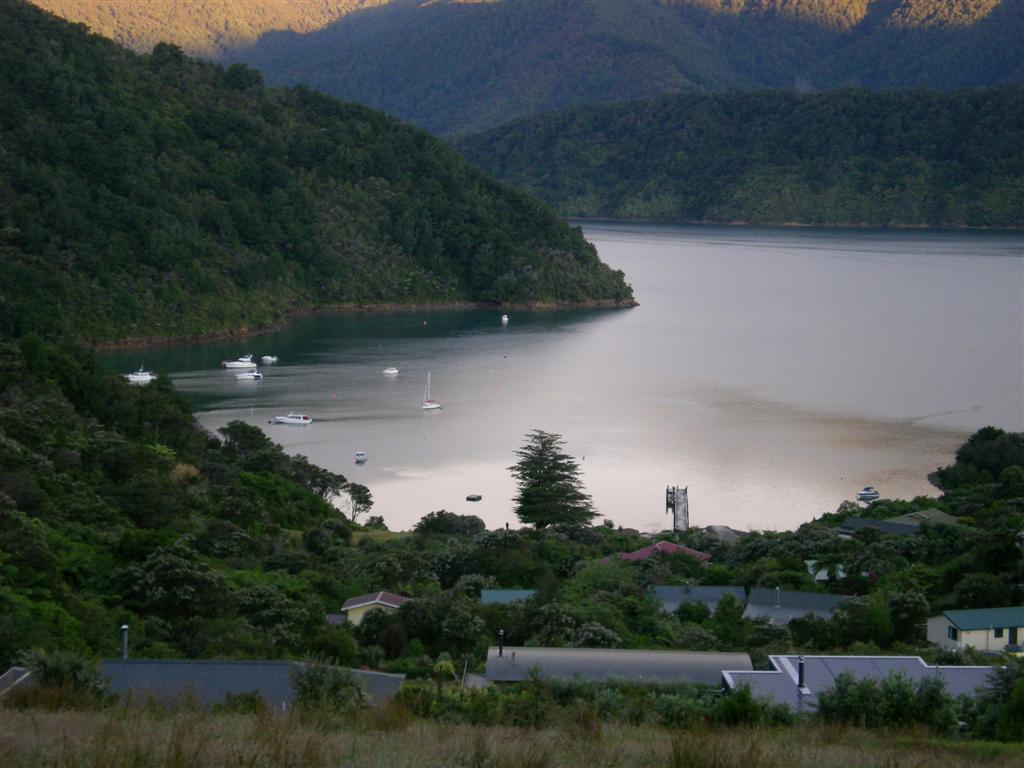
Penzance Bay from a walking track, December 2007

Penzance Bay is a popular bay located in Tennyson Inlet, New Zealand, within the Marlborough Sounds. Tennyson Inlet is an arm of Pelorus Sound / Te Hoiere. The bay is immediately north of Tuna Bay, which is accessed by the same road.

== Attractions ==
Penzance's beach is of gravel, which is unusual for this area of the Marlborough Sounds. This gives the beach a good reputation for safe and pleasant swimming. The bay contains a boat ramp, a large wharf, and a swimming island. These facilities coupled with ease of access gives the bay a great reputation for boating activities and fishing. There are walking tracks which link many of the adjacent bays together, such as Duncan Bay and Elaine Bay. Penzance is surrounded with native forest, much of it is untouched. The native forest contains large southern beech trees, Nothofagus species; along with conifers, as well as perching plants and epiphytes. In early summer, large numbers of the New Zealand ground orchid Pterostylis banksii are present along the walking tracks. The Maori name for the orchard is tutukiwi, or beak of a kiwi.

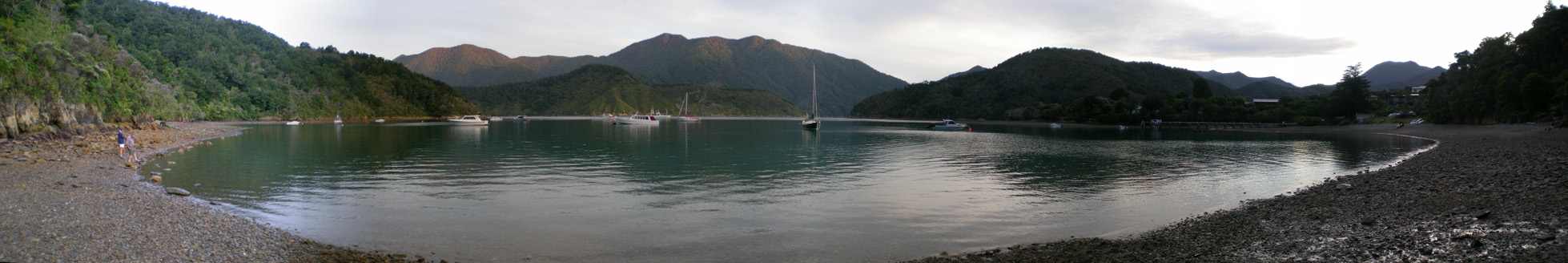
Penzance Bay panorama from the beach, December 2007

== Access ==
Access to Penzance is gained through Archers Road which is off Tennyson Inlet Road. The turn off is slightly north of Rai Valley. Penzance is located about 1 hour and 15 minutes away from Nelson.

== Settlement ==
The Penzance settlement is small with very few permanent residents. The settlement is mostly composed of baches or New Zealand holiday homes.
