= Tawero Point =

Coordinates: 41.06900°S 173.94653°E

Tawero Point marks the eastern limit of the Wilson Bay Farm and the southern approach to Tawhitinui Reach in Pelorus Sound / Te Hoiere, part of the Marlborough Sounds Maritime Park at the top of the South Island of New Zealand. Located at the end of a distinctive land feature easily recognisable on a chart or from the air, Tawero Point is home to a number of hardy Romney Marsh sheep which graze its steep and at times windswept slopes. The point is identified at night by maritime navigation lights on either side of the headland. All vessels leaving the inner sound for the open sea must round Tawero Point.
