= Tennyson Inlet =

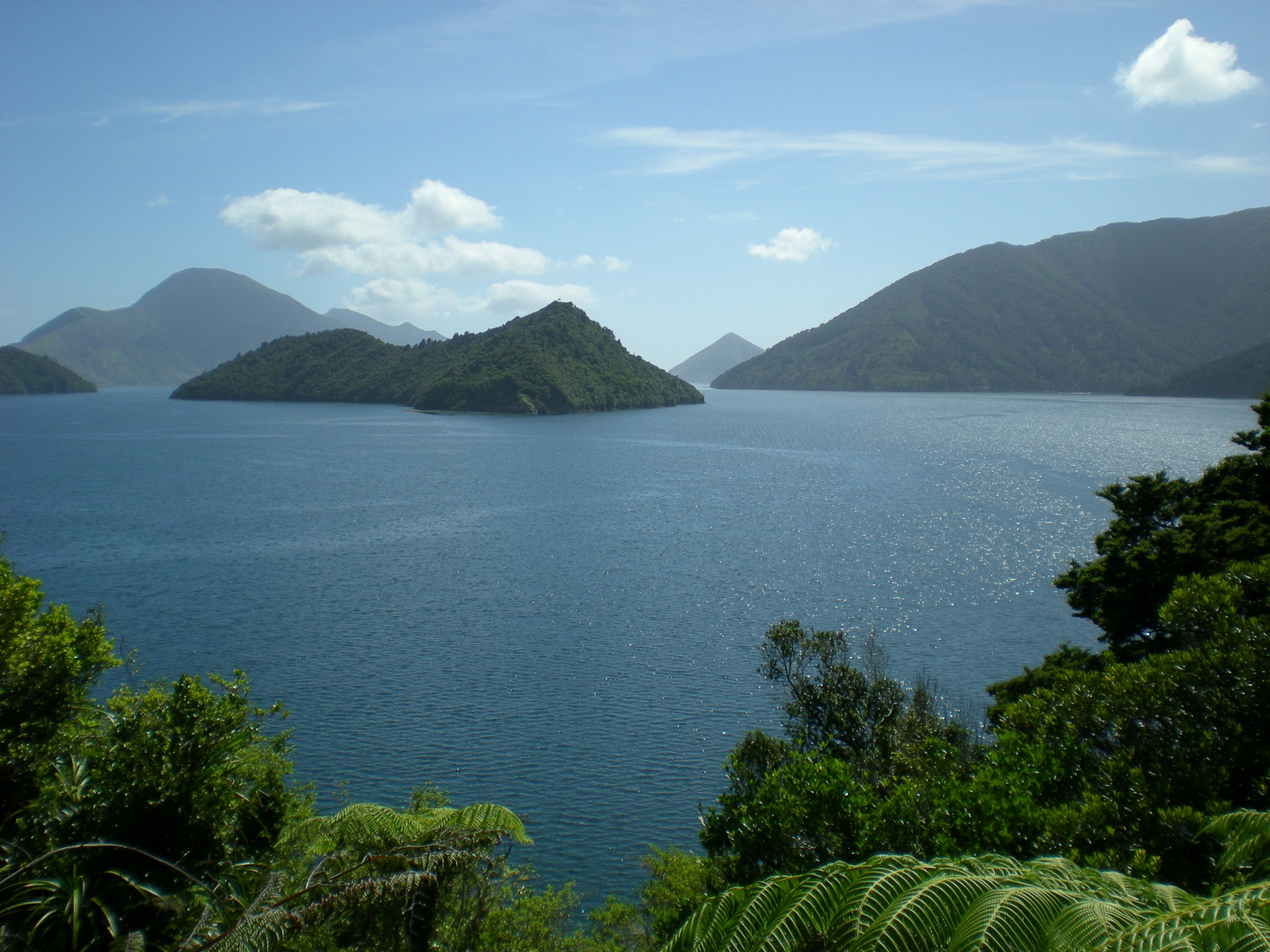
- Tarakaipā Island north Tennyson Inlet, December 2007

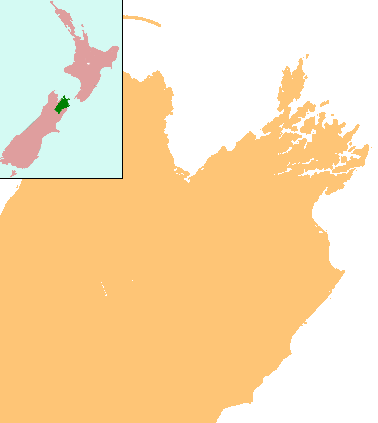
- Location within New Zealand Marlborough
- Coordinates: 41°04′44.08″S 173°47′39.53″E
- Part of: Pelorus Sound / Te Hoiere
- Max. length: 10 kilometres (6.2 mi)
- Islands: Tarakaipā Island, Tawhitinui Island
- Settlements: Duncan Bay, Penzance Bay, Elaine Bay

Tennyson Inlet, (New Zealand) is the western arm of Pelorus Sound / Te Hoiere in the Marlborough Sounds. Tennyson Inlet encompasses Duncan Bay to Tawhitinui Reach. This area is about 10 kilometres (6 mi) long. Tarakaipā and Tawhitinui Islands are the two largest islands in the inlet. There are three main settlements which are used mostly for recreation.

== Settlements ==
Tennyson Inlet contains three main settlements. These settlements are Duncan Bay, Penzance Bay, and Elaine Bay (south to north). The other bays are Te Mako, Harvey Bay, Ngawhakawhiti, Tuna, Godsiff (AKA Matai Bay), Deep, and Tawa bay. There are small settlements in Tuna Bay and Deep Bay, a hut in Godsiff Bay, and camp sites at Harvey Bay, Ngawhakawhiti, Tawa Bay and Elaine Bay.

== Access ==
Turn off State highway number six (SH6)at Rai Valley towards French Pass and Tennyson Inlet. Turn right at bridge for Penzance and Duncan Bay, or for Elaine Bay continue on the Croisilles-French Pass road. Road access to Elaine Bay began in 1957. Duncan and Penzance Bay could be accessed in 1960 through Opouri Valley, which is the current route. This road was constructed for logging potential in the area. Note that camp sites at Ngawhakawhiti and Tawa Bay and the hut at Matai (AKA Godsiff) Bay are accessible by boat only.

== Attractions ==
Tennyson Inlet is popular for fishing and boating because the boat ramps being a short distance from Nelson and Blenheim. Duncan Bay is especially popular because it is the closest place to launch a boat in the Marlborough Sounds from Nelson. There are walking tracks along some of the inlet which connect the bays together. Duncan bay is at the start of the Nydia Track, a two-day walk ending at Kaiuma Bay in Pelorus Sound. There is no shop or public transport at Kaiuma so transport should be pre-arranged. The native forest is also a major attraction for this area. Many baches, or holiday homes are present in this area, permanent resident numbers are low.
