= Eric Lee-Johnson =

New Zealand artist and photographer (1908–1993)

Eric Albert Lee-Johnson
- Born: 8 November 1908; Suva, Fiji
- Died: 24 May 1993 (aged 84)
- Education: Elam School of Art, Camberwell School of Art and Crafts, Central School of Art and Design
- Known for: Painting

Eric Albert Lee-Johnson (8 November 1908 – 24 May 1993) was a New Zealand artist and photographer.

== Biography ==
Lee-Johnson was born in Suva, Fiji and moved to New Zealand in 1912 with his parents. As a child he showed an unusual gift for drawing and he entered Auckland's Elam School of Art where he remained from 1923 to 1926. At 18 he joined newspaper publishers Wilson & Horton’s printing department and within a year was in charge of the studio and working a lithograph artist and illustrator. In 1930 he sailed for London, England. He spent eight years in London, from the age of 21 working as designer and typographer with the large advertising agency S.H. Benson. He studied lithography at Camberwell School of Art and Crafts and attended Charles Porter's life classes at the Central School of Art and Design in London. His work from 1931 to 1936 was influenced by contemporary German typography, graphics and poster design in Europe.

In 1938 he accepted a contract from Illott's Advertising Agency in Wellington and returned to New Zealand. He immediately rejoined the art scene and, in 1939, he was elected a member of the New Zealand Academy of Fine Arts serving a term on the Committee of Management, National Art Gallery. His health broke down and after more than two years in Pukeora sanatorium he left the commercial world and with his wife and son went to live the simple life at Piha and become a full-time painter.

Lee-Johnson lived in various parts of New Zealand from 1942 to 1960 including Coromandel and the Hokianga, and his non-figurative abstract paintings date from this time. In the 1950s a series of his North New Zealand paintings and topographical drawings recording the architecture of some surviving early wooden buildings, set off a whole romantic movement in New Zealand art. In 1956 he became the first New Zealand painter of his generation to have a monograph published on his work. Public awareness of his painting was further increased in 1956 and 1957, when a short documentary film about his work was seen in public theatres throughout the country. Changes in the landscape, pacific images and the inclusion of found objects such as shells and stones were themes running through his work throughout the 1960s and 1970s. Lee-Johnson is represented in all major collections throughout the country, including the national art collection at the Museum of New Zealand Te Papa Tongarewa, all public galleries, the Hocken Collections, and Alexander Turnbull Library. A retrospective exhibition of his paintings and drawings toured New Zealand in 1981–82.

In addition to his painting, Lee-Johnson was also a freelance photographer who documented the daily life of New Zealanders from the early 1950s through to the 1970s. His photographs were as widely known as his paintings – including images of Opo the Dolphin, and scenes of New Zealand life. Lee-Johnson had intended his photography to form a picture library the use of which would finance his art. The collection of tens of thousands of negatives and the copyright was purchased by the Museum of New Zealand Te Papa Tongarewa in 1997, four years after his death.
