= Fairy Bay =

Body of water on New Zealand coast

Coordinates: 41°07′S 173°52′E

This photo, looking east, was taken from the ridge on the southern side of Fairy Bay, leading up to Mt Stanley around 1994.

Fairy Bay (Māori name: Te Oru Mamaku, "Bay of the Big Black Ferns") is east of Mount Stanley, elevation 971 metres (3,186 ft), in Pelorus Sound / Te Hoiere, part of the Marlborough Sounds Maritime Park, at the top of the South Island, New Zealand. The origin of the name is thought to have been the fairy penguin. It has previously been known as Falls River Bay and Sandfly Bay. A neighbouring bay immediately to the south is called Penguin Bay.

On the northern side of Fairy Bay is a camp site popular with kayakers and the beginning of a foot track through native bush which leads to the jetty at Jacobs Bay via Dillon Bell, a small deep water haven for yachts and motor cruisers.

There are also two marine farms located on the northern side of Fairy Bay, contributors to the Marlborough region's green lipped mussel (Perna canaliculus) industry based in Havelock. The area has also been home to wild mussels.

Fairy Bay has some 13 building sites, of which eight now contain dwellings. Not connected by road, access is by boat from the township and port of Havelock at the head of Pelorus Sound, some 25 kilometres (16 mi) away or 35 mins by water taxi. Due to its remote location, there is no connection to the national electricity grid; however, there is a 'landline' telephone connection via a radio link. Cellular phone coverage ranges from nil to marginal.
