= Opo (dolphin) =

Bottlenose dolphin

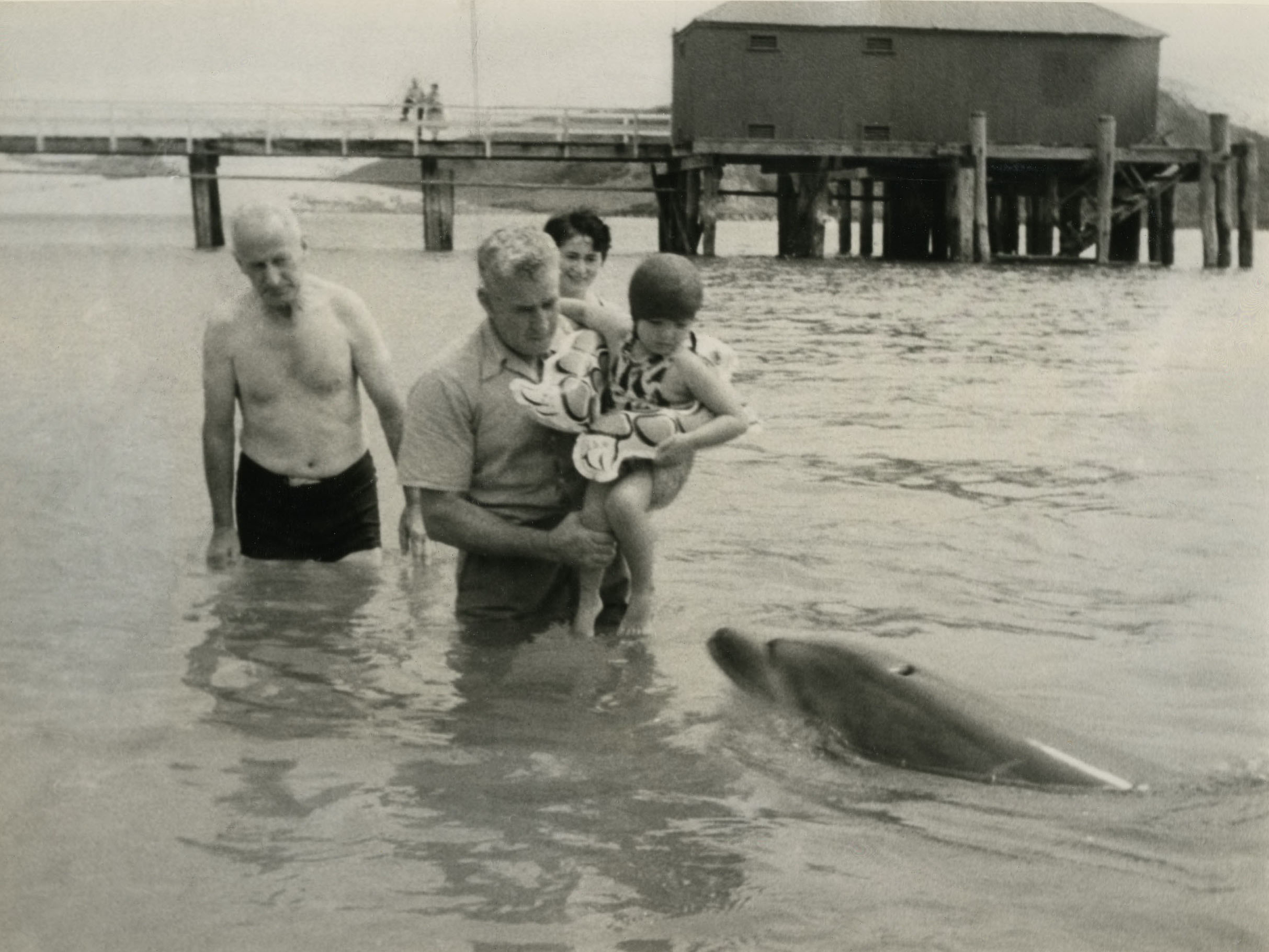
Opo entertains visitors in 1956

Opo was a bottlenose dolphin who became famous throughout New Zealand during the summers of 1955 to 1956 for playing with the children of the small town of Opononi on the Hokianga harbour.

Opo was a wild dolphin that started following fishing boats around Opononi in early 1955. She was originally named "Opononi Jack", based on Pelorus Jack, since she was presumed to be male. Unlike the majority of dolphins, she had no qualms about human company, and would perform stunts for locals, play with objects like beach balls and beer bottles, and allow children to swim alongside her and make contact.

Māori children were more reluctant to play with Opo, as cultural beliefs said the dolphin was a messenger from Kupe.

The dolphin became a local celebrity but news of her soon spread, and visitors from throughout the country would come to watch her. On 8 March 1956 official protection for Opo, requested by locals, was made law, but on 9 March she was found dead in a rock crevice at Koutu Point. There were suggestions that she had become stranded while fishing, or that she had been killed by fishermen fishing with gelignite. Her death was reported nationwide, and she was buried with full Māori honours in a special plot next to the Opononi War Memorial Hall.

== Legacy ==
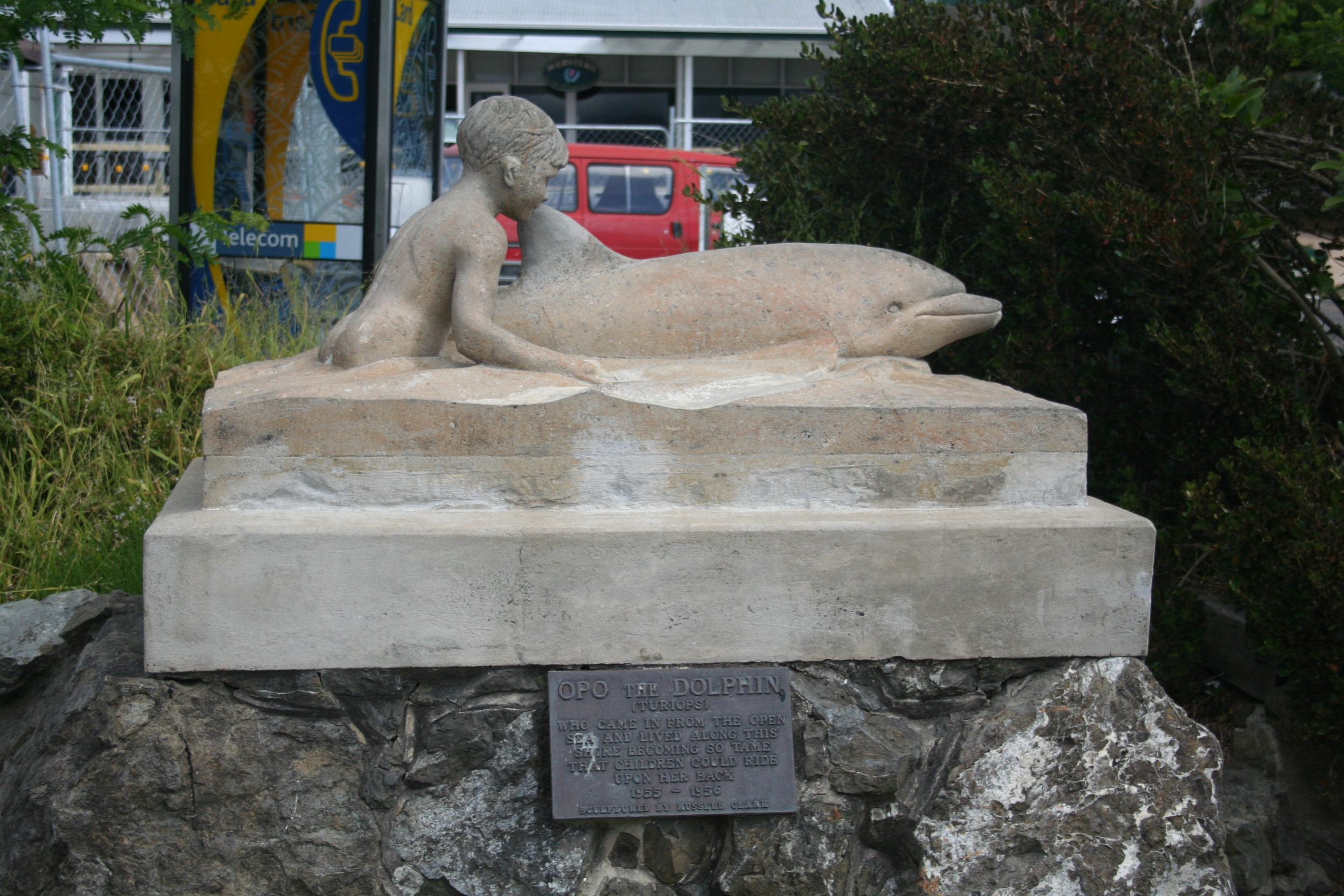
Statue of Opo the dolphin in Opononi

The song "Opo the Friendly Dolphin" was written by Crombie Murdoch and recorded by Pat McMinn (coincidentally on the same day Opo died) and was highly popular. A second song was written by Julie Collier in 1988.

Several documentary films have been made about Opo. Rudall Hayward made a film called The Amazing Dolphin of Opononi, released in 1956 and shown in 26 countries.

Opo was the inspiration for the Maurice Shadbolt novel This Summer's Dolphin and a children's storybook titled Opo the Gay Dolphin by Avis Acres was published by Reed Publishing Ltd. Opo also features significantly in the 1988 novel by Noel Virtue: "Then Upon the Evil Season" (Hutchinson).

A stone statue of the dolphin playing with a child by Russell Clark was erected in Opononi in 1960. Following vandalism this was replaced by a bronze casting in 2013, with the restored original put on display at the Hokianga Historical Society's Museum at Omapere.

The Museum of New Zealand Te Papa Tongarewa holds a large number of photographs of Opo taken by Eric Lee-Johnson.

In 1991, playwright, screenwriter and theatre critic, John Smythe, produced a novel based on Opo, called The Peace Monster. Smythe's story was further developed as a theatre-play script of the same name and as an ebook, OPO The Peace Monster, in 2016.

A Scottish country dance called Opo was published in 1994. It includes a hey/reel for three with the 1s dancing as a unit and changing the lead on the ends of the heys, a move known as a 'dolphin hey'.

In 2006, New Zealand musician Don McGlashan wrote the song Miracle Sun about Opo.

== See also ==
- Moko (dolphin)
- Pelorus Jack
- List of individual cetaceans
