= Avis Acres =

New Zealand artist, writer, illustrator, conservationist (1910–1994)

- Born: Thyra Avis Mary McNeill; 26 March 1910; Wellington, New Zealand
- Died: 15 October 1994 (aged 84); Tauranga, New Zealand
- Education: St Cuthbert’s College
- Known for: Cartoonist and illustrator
- Spouse: George Audley Johnston Acres (m. 1935; died 1993)

Thyra Avis Mary Acres (née McNeill, 26 March 1910 – 15 October 1994) was a New Zealand artist, writer, illustrator and conservationist. She is best known for her comic strip about two pōhutukawa fairies, Hutu and Kawa.

== Biography ==
Avis Acres was born in Wellington, New Zealand, on 26 March 1910, the eldest of four children. In 1913 she moved to Auckland with her parents. She attended St Cuthbert's College in Auckland from 1915 until 1924, when family financial difficulty forced Acres to get a job writing show cards for shops. She later worked in an architect's office, copying drawings. Encouraged by her father who recognised her talent for drawing, Avis attended night classes to learn pen and ink sketching at the Druleigh School of Art on Queen Street. It was these lessons that gave her the confidence to write her first cartoon series, The Adventures of Twink and Wink, the Twinkle Twins which was published by the Auckland Star.

Together with a friend, Avis ran a successful business painting decorations onto furniture.

Avis married George Audley Johnston Acres (nicknamed Bob, after Bob Acres) on August 14 1935. The couple bought a poultry farm on the outskirts of Hamilton, and named their new property 'The Acreage'. Avis was active in the local Anglican community, the NZ National Party and the Plunket Society. During this period she took lessons in oil painting from Ida Carey.

In 1950, Avis and Bob moved to Taupō, in the belief that the climate there would be better for Bob's health as he had suffered from respiratory illness since he was 18. They relocated several more times, first to Levin, then Te Horo, and finally Tauranga.

Avis died on 15 October 1994, she had no children.

== Professional life ==
Acres is best known for her comic strip about two pōhutukawa fairies, Hutu and Kawa, which was published weekly on the children's page of the New Zealand Herald from September 1950 to July 1960, and as three books by A.H. & A.W. Reed. Acres was inspired to create Hutu and Kawa after reading The Gum Nut Babies by Australian author and illustrator May Gibbs and believing she could have success with a local equivalent. The Hutu and Kawa series was republished in 1990 by Heinemann Reed.

In 1956 Acres published Opo the Gay Dolphin, a picture book based on the true story of Opo, a bottlenose dolphin that lived in the North Island town of Opononi.

From November 1978 until May 1984 she wrote and illustrated a column for children, Birds I Have Met, in the monthly Forest and Bird magazine. She also wrote stories about a horse named Dick for Horse and Pony magazine.

Acres wrote educational nature study booklets, published by Reed for use in schools.

Although her Hutu and Kawa stories incorporated fantasy elements, Acres' depictions of New Zealand's flora and fauna were realistically drawn. The books communicated Avis' own strong conservation ethos and understanding of ecological issues, such as the impact of introduced pests on the native environment.

== Legacy ==
In 2026 the Avis Acres Collection held by the Alexander Turnbull Library was added to the UNESCO Memory of the World Aotearoa New Zealand register.

== Selected works ==
- The Adventures of Hutu and Kawa (1955)
- Hutu and Kawa Meet Tuatara (1956)
- Opo the Gay Dolphin (1956)
- Hutu and Kawa Find an Island (1957)
