= List of shipwrecks in 1751 =

The List of shipwrecks in 1751 includes some ships sunk, wrecked or otherwise lost during 1751.

Until 1752, the year began on Lady Day (25 March) Thus 24 March 1750 was followed by 25 March 1751. 1751 was a special case, only having 282 days, per the Calendar (New Style) Act 1750, meaning that 31 December 1751 was followed by 1 January 1752.

table of contents
← 1750 / 1751 / 1752 →
Jan	Feb	Mar	Apr
May	Jun	Jul	Aug
Sep	Oct	Nov	Dec
Unknown date

== March ==
=== 26 March ===
List of shipwrecks: 26 March 1751
Ship	State	Description
Lamb	Great Britain	The ship was driven ashore at the mouth of the River Shannon, Ireland and was severely damaged. She was later refloated and taken in to Kilrush, County Cork or Limerick. Lamb was on a voyage from North Carolina, British America, to London.

== April ==
=== 20 April ===
List of shipwrecks: 20 April 1751
Ship	State	Description
Johanna	Great Britain	The ship was driven ashore in the Isles of Scilly.
Kingston	Great Britain	The ship was driven ashore in the Isles of Scilly.

=== Unknown date ===
List of shipwrecks: Unknown date 1751
Ship	State	Description
Diepe Packet	Great Britain	The ship was lost off Folkestone, Kent, before 5 April. Her crew were rescued. She was on a voyage from Milford Haven, Pembrokeshire, to London.
Providence	Great Britain	The ship was lost in the Irish Sea with the loss of all but three of her crew. She was on a voyage from Swansea, Glamorgan, to Waterford, Ireland.

== May ==
=== Unknown date ===
List of shipwrecks: Unknown date 1751
Ship	State	Description
Allan	Great Britain	The ship foundered in The Swin, off the coast of Essex before 14 May. She was on a voyage from Newcastle upon Tyne, Northumberland, to London.
Elizabeth	Great Britain	The ship was driven ashore at St. Lucar, Spain, before 10 May.
Rose in June	Great Britain	The ship was driven ashore at St. Lucar before 10 May.

== June ==
=== 25 June ===
List of shipwrecks: 25 June 1751
Ship	State	Description
Hibernia	Great Britain	The ship was driven ashore east of Gibraltar. She was on a voyage from Málaga, Spain, to Gibraltar.

=== 27 June ===
List of shipwrecks: 27 June 1751
Ship	State	Description
Diamond	Great Britain	The ship capsized in the Atlantic Ocean 120 leagues (360 nautical miles (670 km)) off the Virginia Capes, British America. Her crew were rescued.

=== Unknown date ===
List of shipwrecks: Unknown date 1751
Ship	State	Description
Mary	(Kingdom of Great Britain) Jersey	The ship foundered in the Bay of Biscay. Her crew were rescued. She was on a voyage from Jersey to Bilbao, Spain.
Seanymph	Great Britain	The ship was driven ashore near Milford Haven, Pembrokeshire, before 18 June. Her crew were rescued. She was on a voyage from Dublin to Carmarthen.

== July ==
=== 24 July ===
List of shipwrecks: 24 July 1751
Ship	State	Description
Friendship	Great Britain	The brig was driven ashore and wrecked at Saint Kitts.

=== Unknown date ===
List of shipwrecks: Unknown date 1751
Ship	State	Description
Bacchus	Great Britain	The ship was driven ashore and wrecked on Ouessant, Finistère, Kingdom of France before 19 July. Her crew were rescued. She was on a voyage from Porto, Portugal, to Falmouth, Cornwall.
Duncanon	Great Britain	The ship was wrecked on the Hogsty Reef before 29 July. Her crew survived. She was on a voyage from Jamaica to London.

== August ==
=== 8 August ===
List of shipwrecks: 8 August 1751
Ship	State	Description
Warwick	(Kingdom of Great Britain) British America	The ship was lost on Atwood's Keys. Her crew were rescued. She was on a voyage from Philadelphia, Pennsylvania, to Hispaniola.

=== 30 August ===
List of shipwrecks: 30 August 1751
Ship	State	Description
Magdalena	France	The ship foundered in the Windward Passage. Some of her crew were rescued. She was on a voyage from San Domingo to Nantes, Loire-Atlantique.

=== Unknown date ===
List of shipwrecks: Unknown date 1751
Ship	State	Description
Alice and Betty	Great Britain	The ship was lost on the coast of the Isle of Man before 23 August. She was on a voyage from Liverpool, Lancashire, to and African port.
Alida	Dutch Republic	The ship foundered in the North Sea off Great Yarmouth, Norfolk, Great Britain, before 20 August. She was on a voyage from Hamburg to Carthagena, Spain.
Ducalion	Great Britain	The ship was driven ashore near Hythe, Kent. She was on a voyage from Carmarthen to London.
Duke of Cumberland	Great Britain	The ship exploded in the Irish Sea off Dublin, Ireland before 16 August. Her crew were rescued. She was on a voyage from Whitehaven, Cumberland, to Virginia, British America.
Flower	Ireland	The ship was driven ashore on St Michael's Mount, Cornwall, Great Britain, before 23 August. She was on a voyage from "Dram", Norway to Cork.
Providence	Great Britain	The ship was driven ashore between Port-Louis, Morbihan and Brest, Finistère, France, before 27 August with the loss of two of her crew. She was on a voyage from Bilbao, Spain, to Chester, Cheshire.

== September ==
=== 8 September ===
List of shipwrecks: 8 September 1751
Ship	State	Description
Mary	Ireland	The ship was driven ashore at Stornoway, Isle of Lewis. Her crew were rescued. She was on a voyage from "Drunton" to Dublin.

=== 11 September ===
List of shipwrecks: 11 September 1751
Ship	State	Description
HMS Fox	(Kingdom of Great Britain) Royal Navy	The sixth rate was wrecked in a hurricane at Jamaica. Her crew were rescued.

=== 14 September ===
List of shipwrecks: 14 September 1751
Ship	State	Description
Stanhope	Great Britain	The brig was wrecked on the coast of Scotland with the loss of two of her crew.

=== 18 September ===
List of shipwrecks: 18 September 1751
Ship	State	Description
Amstelland	Dutch East India Company	The fluyt was driven ashore and wrecked on Sylt, Duchy of Schleswig.

=== Unknown date ===
List of shipwrecks: Unknown date 1751
Ship	State	Description
Christiana	Great Britain	The ship was lost on the African coast with the loss of all but one of her crew. She was on a voyage from London to Sierra Leone.
Katherine-Elizabeth	Hamburg	The ship was lost on the Dutch coast before 20 September. She was on a voyage from Hamburg to Cádiz, Spain.
Phenix	Russia	The ship was lost on the coast of Jutland before 24 September. She was on a voyage from Riga to Venice.

== October ==
=== 2 October ===
List of shipwrecks: 2 October 1751
Ship	State	Description
Friendship	Great Britain	The ship was lost near Carlscroon, Sweden. She was on a voyage from Saint Petersburg, Russia, to Chester, Cheshire.

=== 30 October ===
List of shipwrecks: 30 October 1751
Ship	State	Description
Lyon	(Kingdom of Great Britain) British America	The ship foundered in the Atlantic Ocean. Her crew were rescued by Speedwell (Great Britain). She was on a voyage from Boston, Massachusetts, to Barbados.

=== Unknown date ===
List of shipwrecks: Unknown date 1751
Ship	State	Description
Eustace	Great Britain	The ship was lost near Dunkirk, Nord, France, before 8 October. She was on a voyage from London to Dunkirk.
Fox	Ireland	The cutter foundered off Margate, Kent, Great Britain, before 29 October with the loss of all but one of her crew. She was on a voyage from Riga, Russia, to Dublin.

== November ==
=== 13 November ===
List of shipwrecks: 13 November 1751
Ship	State	Description
Beckford	Great Britain	The ship was lost at Bilbao, Spain.

=== 16 November ===
List of shipwrecks: 16 November 1751
Ship	State	Description
Paul Katharina	France	The snow was driven ashore between The Needles and Yarmouth, Isle of Wight, Great Britain. She was on a voyage from San Domingo to Havre de Grâce, Seine-Maritime.
Prospect	Great Britain	The ship foundered in the English Channel off Beachy Head, Sussex, with the loss of her captain. She was on a voyage from Plymouth, Devon, to London

=== 17 November ===
List of shipwrecks: 17 November 1751
Ship	State	Description
Queen of Hungary	Great Britain	The ship was driven ashore and wrecked on the Isle of Man. She was on a voyage from Virginia, British America, to Whitehaven, Cumberland.

=== 22 November ===
List of shipwrecks: 22 November 1751
Ship	State	Description
Racer	Great Britain	The ship was abandoned in The Downs during a storm. She was later taken in to Ramsgate, Kent. Racer was on a voyage from Madeira to Amsterdam, North Holland, Dutch Republic.

=== 24 November ===
List of shipwrecks: 24 November 1751
Ship	State	Description
Dolphin	France	The ship foundered in the English Channel off South Foreland, Kent, Great Britain. She was on a voyage from Newfoundland to Havre de Grâce, Seine-Maritime.

=== 28 November ===
List of shipwrecks: 28 November 1751
Ship	State	Description
Elizabeth	Great Britain	The ship was driven ashore and wrecked on the coast of Normandy, France, with the loss of 22 of her 25 crew. She was on a voyage from London to Jamaica.

=== Unknown date ===
List of shipwrecks: Unknown date 1751
Ship	State	Description
Charlotte	Hamburg	The ship was lost near Calais, France.
Flower	Great Britain	The ship was driven ashore near Calais. She was on a voyage from Hull, Yorkshire, to Barcelona, Spain.
Nightingale	Great Britain	The ship foundered in the River Tees before 19 November. She was on a voyage from Stockton on Tees, County Durham, to London.

== December ==
=== 2 December ===
List of shipwrecks: 2 December 1751
Ship	State	Description
Providence	Great Britain	The ship was lost near Great Yarmouth, Norfolk. She was on a voyage from Hamburg to Bristol, Gloucestershire.

=== 13 December ===
List of shipwrecks: 13 December 1751
Ship	State	Description
Charm	Great Britain	African slave trade: The ship foundered with the loss of all slaves on board. Her eighteen crew were rescued by the snow Captain Brownin (Great Britain). Charm was on a voyage from the Cape Coast to Barbados.

=== 24 December ===
List of shipwrecks: 24 December 1751
Ship	State	Description
St. Anthony	Great Britain	The ship was lost near Redreeth, Cornwall, with the loss of all hands. She was on a voyage from the Canary Islands to London.

=== 31 December ===
List of shipwrecks: 31 December 1751
Ship	State	Description
Familia	(Kingdom of Great Britain) British America	The schooner was lost on this date. All on board were rescued.

== Unknown date ==
List of shipwrecks: Unknown date 1751
Ship	State	Description
Andromeda	France	The ship foundered in the Bay of Biscay before 5 April. Her crew were rescued. She was on a voyage from San Domingo to Nantes, Loire-Atlantique.
Argo	Great Britain	The ship was lost at Barbados before 19 November. Se was on a voyage from Barbados to London.
Charming Molly	Great Britain	The ship was destroyed by fire at St John's, Newfoundland, British America, before 27 September.
Earl of Hopton	Great Britain	The ship was lost in ice off Greenland before 6 August.
Elizabeth	Great Britain	The ship was foundered in the Mediterranean Sea 10 leagues (30 nautical miles (56 km)) west of Cette, Hérault, France, with the loss of all but four of her crew.
Europa	Dutch Republic	The ship was lost in ice off the coast of Greenland before 28 June.
Great Britain	Great Britain	The ship foundered in the Gulf of Florida before 3 December. Her crew were rescued. She was on a voyage from Jamaica to London.
Greyhound	(Kingdom of Great Britain) British America	The ship was driven ashore and severely damaged in the Chowan River, Virginia, before 24 September. She was on a voyage from Boston, Massachusetts, to North Carolina.
Jane	Great Britain	The ship was lost on the Acklens Keys before 13 September. Her crew were rescued by a French vessel She was on a voyage from Jamaica to London.
Katherine	Great Britain	The ship was lost on Heneaga, Virgin Islands, before 27 September. She was on a voyage from Jamaica to London.
Katherine	Ireland	The ship sank at Marseille, Bouches-du-Rhône France before 3 December.
King's Fisher	Great Britain	The convict ship was seized by the convicts on board. They murdered the ship's crew and she was run ashore on the coast of Virginia, British America, where she was wrecked. King's Fisher was on a voyage from Newbury, Massachusetts, to Carolina.
Martha	Great Britain	The ship was lost on the Roman Sand, off the coast of South Carolina, British America, before 4 June. She was on a voyage from the Canary Islands to South Carolina.
Monmouth	Great Britain	The ship was lost on Glover's Keys before 23 August. Her crew were rescued. She was on a voyage from British Honduras to London.
Nancy	Great Britain	The ship was lost on the coast of Africa before 9 July.
Nuestra Señora del Carmen	Spain	The ship was lost near Carthagena, Viceroyalty of New Granada. She was on a voyage from Cádiz to Carthagena.
Phenix	Great Britain	The ship was lost on the coast of Spain before 15 November. She was on a voyage from Sicily to Cádiz, Spain.
Prince of Wales	Great Britain	The ship foundered in the Mediterranean Sea 10 leagues west of Cette. Her crew were rescued.
Recovery	Great Britain	The ship was lost in the Windward Passage before 22 November. She was on a voyage from Jamaica to New York, British America.
Revenge	Great Britain	The ship foundered off Dénia, Spain, before 3 December. She was on a voyage from Dénia to Bristol, Gloucestershire.
Ropeyard	Great Britain	The ship was lost in Point Lance Bay, Newfoundland before 17 September. Her crew were rescued.
Santa Antonio & Santa Felix	Spain	The ship foundered off Havana, Cuba, before 26 July. Her crew were rescued. She was on a voyage from Carthagena, Viceroyalty of New Granada, to Cádiz.
Speedwell	Great Britain	The ship was driven ashore on the coast of Virginia before 15 November. She was on a voyage from Virginia to London.
Susannah	Bremen	The ship was lost in ice off the coast of Greenland before 28 June.
Swift	Great Britain	The ship was lost on the Spanish coast before 10 December. She was on a voyage from Newfoundland to Livorno, Grand Duchy of Tuscany
Tuscany	Great Britain	The ship was driven ashore at Port-de-Bouc, Bouches-du-Rhône before 3 December.
Wakend Kraan	Hamburg	The ship was lost in ice off the coast of Greenland before 28 June.
