= Moko (dolphin) =

Dolphin

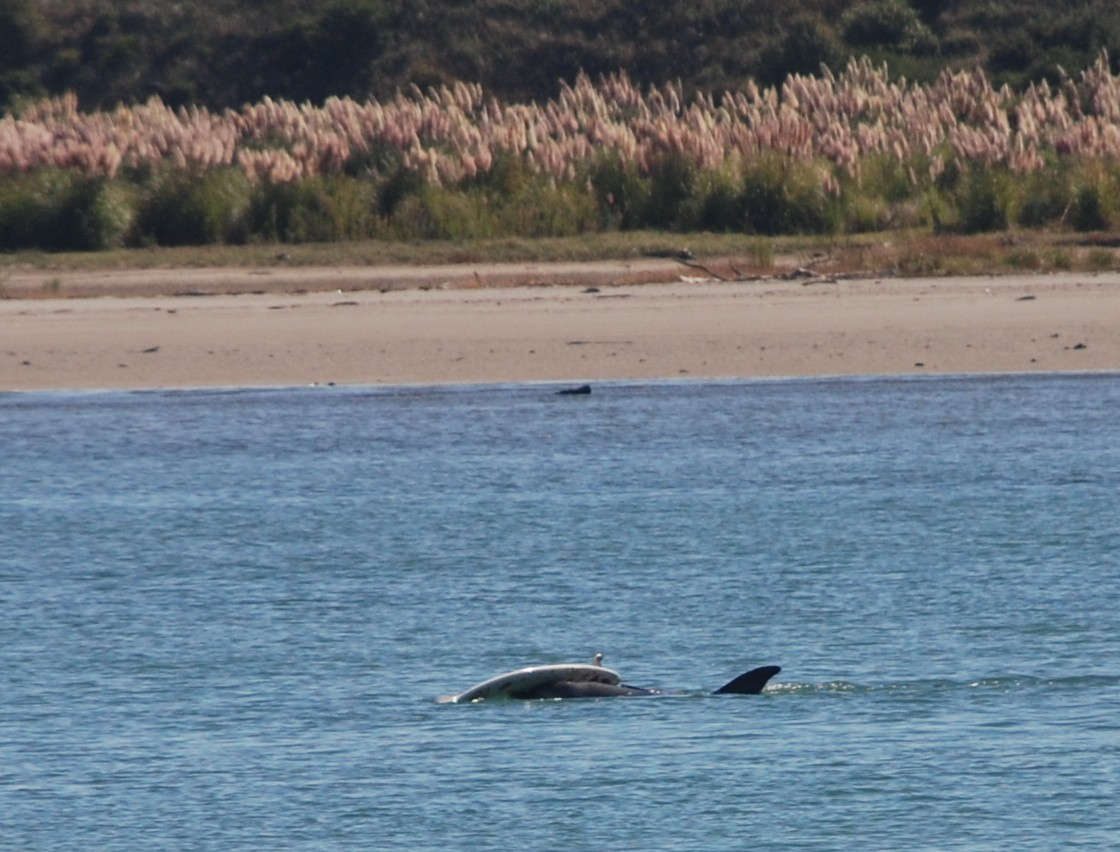
- Moko playing with a surfboard in 2010
- Species: Bottlenose dolphin
- Sex: Male
- Born: 2006
- Died: 7 July 2010 (aged 3–4)
- Resting place: Matakana Island, NZ; Bay of Plenty, NZ
- Years active: 2007–2010
- Known for: Rescue of pygmy sperm whales
- Title: Moko Of Mahia

Moko (2006 – 7 July 2010) was a male bottlenose dolphin who associated with humans on the east coast of the North Island of New Zealand from 2007 to 2010.

Moko, short for Mokotahi, a headland on Mahia Peninsula, was three years old as of July 2009. He resided at Mahia Beach for two and a half years from 2007 to September 2009 and became a major attraction there. He received worldwide fame when he rescued two pygmy sperm whales in March 2008. A year later, he trapped a woman out at sea. At the beginning of September 2009, Moko moved 80 km up the coast to Waikanae Beach, Gisborne, and in January 2010, he moved to Whakatāne in the Bay of Plenty for five months before following a fishing boat to Tauranga on 3 June. Scientists were worried about Moko's welfare after a study found he had been scarred by boats and a fish hook. He was found dead on a beach at Matakana Island near Tauranga on 7 July 2010.

== History ==
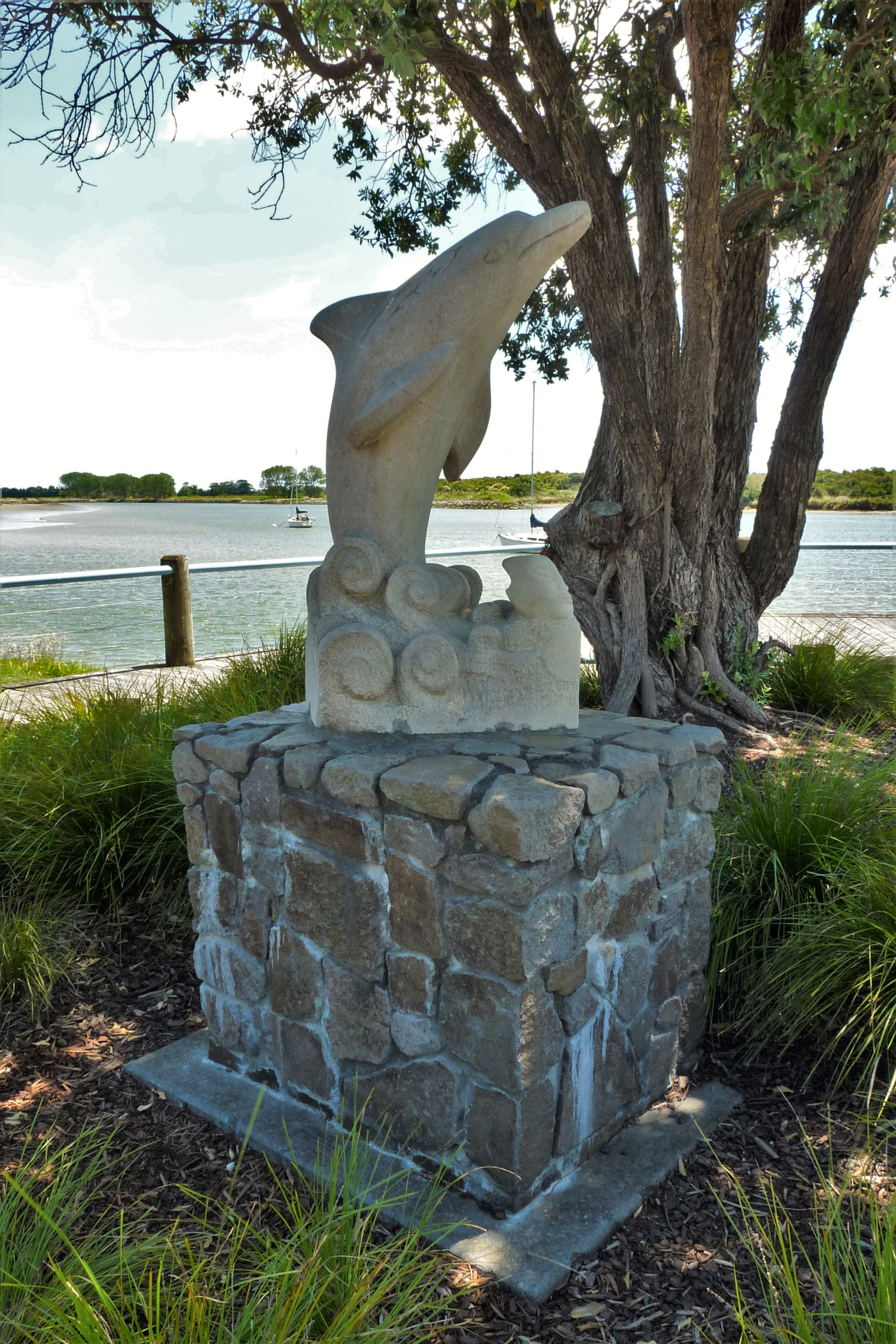
A sculpture of Moko by Jeffrey Bowlin on display next to the Whakatāne River

=== Rescue of pygmy sperm whales ===
In March 2008, Moko was seen helping two pygmy sperm whales that were trapped between a sandbar and Mahia beach. A local man who found the whales told his neighbour, Malcolm Smith, who was a Department of Conservation worker. Smith and other rescuers tried for an hour and a half to re-float the whales, with no success. Smith was wondering if it would be better to kill the two whales when Moko appeared. Moko approached the pair of distressed whales and led them through a narrow channel to the safety of the sea.

=== Stranding of a swimmer ===
In summer, many people swam with Moko at Mahia, but residents believed that during the winter, when there were fewer people, the dolphin got lonely and bored. During the winter (July) of 2009, a New Zealand swimmer, who left late to go swimming at Mahia on her own, started to play with Moko. Difficulties arose when the woman became tired, and the dolphin, who was still playing, did not allow her to return to the shore. As a result of this, the woman began to panic. People back at shore heard the now exhausted woman screaming for help and rowed out to rescue her. They found her wrapped around a buoy and took her back to the shore. Later, the woman said that going out on her own at that late time had probably been unwise and that Moko had meant no harm.

=== Soul in the Sea (2013) ===
New Zealand filmmaker Amy Taylor directed and produced a documentary about Moko, titled Soul in the Sea, which premiered at the 2013 New Zealand International Film Festival. Filmed in the six months leading up to Moko's death, the film follows Moko's impact on the town of Whakatāne.

== Welfare ==
Scientists became worried about Moko's safety after finding that he had been scarred by boats and had received a scar on his upper-right jaw from a fish hook. They noted that out of 30 "lone" dolphins that have been identified around the globe, 14 have been killed or injured as a result of their interactions with humans. A marine welfare organisation, Project Jonah, said that people should give the dolphin his space. Moko was found dead a few months later.

== See also ==
- Bottlenose dolphin
- Opo (dolphin)
- Pelorus Jack
- List of individual cetaceans
