= Ngāti Kuia =

Māori iwi (tribe) in Aotearoa New Zealand

- Iwi (tribe) in Māoridom
- Rohe (region): Nelson
- Waka (canoe): Te Hoiere
- Population: 1,794 (2013)
- Website: ngatikuia.iwi.nz

Ngāti Kuia is a Māori iwi of the Northern South Island in New Zealand. They first settled in the Pelorus Sound / Te Hoiere, and later spread to the Marlborough Sounds, Nelson, and Tasman districts to Taitapu on the West Coast, and as far south as the Nelson Lakes National Park. Ngāti Kuia tradition states that their founding tupuna Matua Hautere, a descendant of Kupe, came to Te Waipounamu in his waka Te Hoiere, guided by the kaitiaki (tribal guardian) Kaikaiawaro.

Ngāti Kuia are the largest and oldest iwi of Te Tauihu o Te Waka a Māui in Te Waipounamu (The Prow of the Canoe of Māui). Also known as The Top of the South Island of New Zealand. The founding tipuna is Matua Hautere, a descendant of Kupe, who came to Te Waipounamu in his waka Te Hoiere. According to Ngāti Kuia whakapapa, Matua Hautere was guided by the kaitiaki Kaikaiāwaro and Ruamano, who took the form of dolphins. Hinepopo/Hinepoupou, a Ngāti Kuia tipuna credited as being the first woman to swim Raukawakawa, in her epic swim from Kāpiti Island to Rangitoto guided also by Kaikaiāwaro. Ngāti Kuia also descends from Awaawa Wetewete Tapiki, who came on the Kurahaupō waka.

Ngāti Kuia is an amalgamation of descendants from Matua Hautere and the Kurahaupō iwi of Ngāi Tara Pounamu, Ngāti Tūmatakōkiri, Ngāti Wairangi, Rangitāne, Ngāti Apa, and Ngāti Māmoe.

Ngāti Kuia are also linked to the oldest known habitation site in New Zealand, located at the Wairau Bar. This area was first settled circa 1300 by people who were born and grew to adulthood in Eastern Polynesia, then sailed to Aotearoa, lived, and were buried at the site.

Ngāti Kuia is named after their tipuna, Kuia, who is a descendant of Matua Hautere. Kuia was born in Te Waipounamu, which is significant for many reasons.

Ngāti Kuia ancestors settled in several locations across Te Tauihu, including the Marlborough Sounds, Motuweka, Te Hora, Whakapuaka, Whakatū, Waimeha, Taitapu, and Lakes Rotoiti and Rotoroa.

Early on, Ngāti Kuia ancestors moved with the seasons for trade, hunting, and fishing, developing unique art and design from the resources and establishing names for the places they lived.

Ngāti Kuia have a rich history of stories and customs that relate to the land, seas, and waters in Te Tauihu.

Ngāti Kuia ancestors were renowned gardeners, fishermen, and harvesters of tītī (muttonbirds).

Known as an iwi karakia especially in relation to te taiao (the environment). Ngāti Kuia are synonymous with pakohe, a black or grey metasomatised argillite stone categorised into 2 types Uriuri(Dark stone) and Marutea(light mud shade stone) found along the Nelson Mineral Belt which became New Zealand’s first known traded commodity. Ngāti Kuia traded with other iwi as far away as Te Tai Tokerau(Northland), Murihiku(Southland) and Rēkohu (the Chatham Islands) in exchange for obsidian from the Central Plateau and other resources.

== First Encounters ==
Ngāti Kuia ancestors, including Kahura and Rōnaki, met Captain Cook at Meretoto in Tōtaranui (Queen Charlotte Sound), trading local resources such as timber and furs for seeds, textiles, and livestock, which were quickly adapted and then resupplied back to Cook's crew on later visits.

Ngāti Kuia whānau supplied food and goods for the settlement of Nelson when it was being established, and at the time of early land prospectors arriving, had the largest kūmara fields in the South Island on the Waimeha Plains. They encouraged settlement in Te Hoiere (Pelorus) in a Deed of Sale with the Crown in 1856, and left their pā at Motuweka so the town of Havelock could be built there.

== Ngāti Kuia Today ==
As descendants of Matua Hautere, Ngāti Kuia has continued to survive through the ages and the turbulent times of natural and man-made disasters. This shows a huge amount of resilience, adaptability, strength, and an ability to find harmony with others. The descendants of Matua Hautere continue to live in Te Tauihu today and around the world.

In 2010, a Deed of Settlement was signed by the iwi of Te Tauihu, which became law in 2014. This acknowledged and listed the wrongdoing by the Crown that meant a loss of language, land, and cultural identity for iwi through unfair laws and legislation, which meant that Ngāti Kuia ancestors had suffered immeasurably.

As part of this deed of Settlement and compensation process, their negotiators acquired land and assets as well as cash. Some of the land acquired through cultural redress and settlement purchases were schools across the region that held cultural significance to the iwi.

The affairs and assets of the iwi are managed by Te Rūnanga o Ngāti Kuia Trust. Ngāti Kuia are associated with Te Hora (Canvastown), Whakatū (Nelson), and Omaka (Blenheim) marae.

Ngāti Kuia have keen interests in managing assets for future generations.

Priority areas include Te Taiao, Ngāti Kuiatanga, Pūtea, and Te Tangata. The values of manaakitanga, kotahitanga, whakatipuranga, and whanaungatanga that Ngāti Kuia tīpuna lived by are still important today.

== See also ==
- List of Māori iwi
