= Te Hoiere (canoe) =

Māori ocean-going, voyaging canoe

- Great Māori migration waka
- Commander: Matua Hautere
- Priest: Kaikaiawaro
- Iwi: Ngāti Kuia

In Māori tradition, Te Hoiere was one of the great ocean-going, voyaging canoes that were used in the migrations that settled New Zealand. Ngāti Kuia tradition states that their founding tupuna Matua Hautere, a descendant of Kupe, came to Te Waipounamu in his waka Te Hoiere, guided by the kaitiaki (tribal guardian) Kaikaiawaro.

== See also ==
- List of Māori waka
