= Pelorus Sound =

Largest of the Marlborough Sounds, New Zealand

Pelorus Sound / Te Hoiere
- Te Hoiere (Māori)
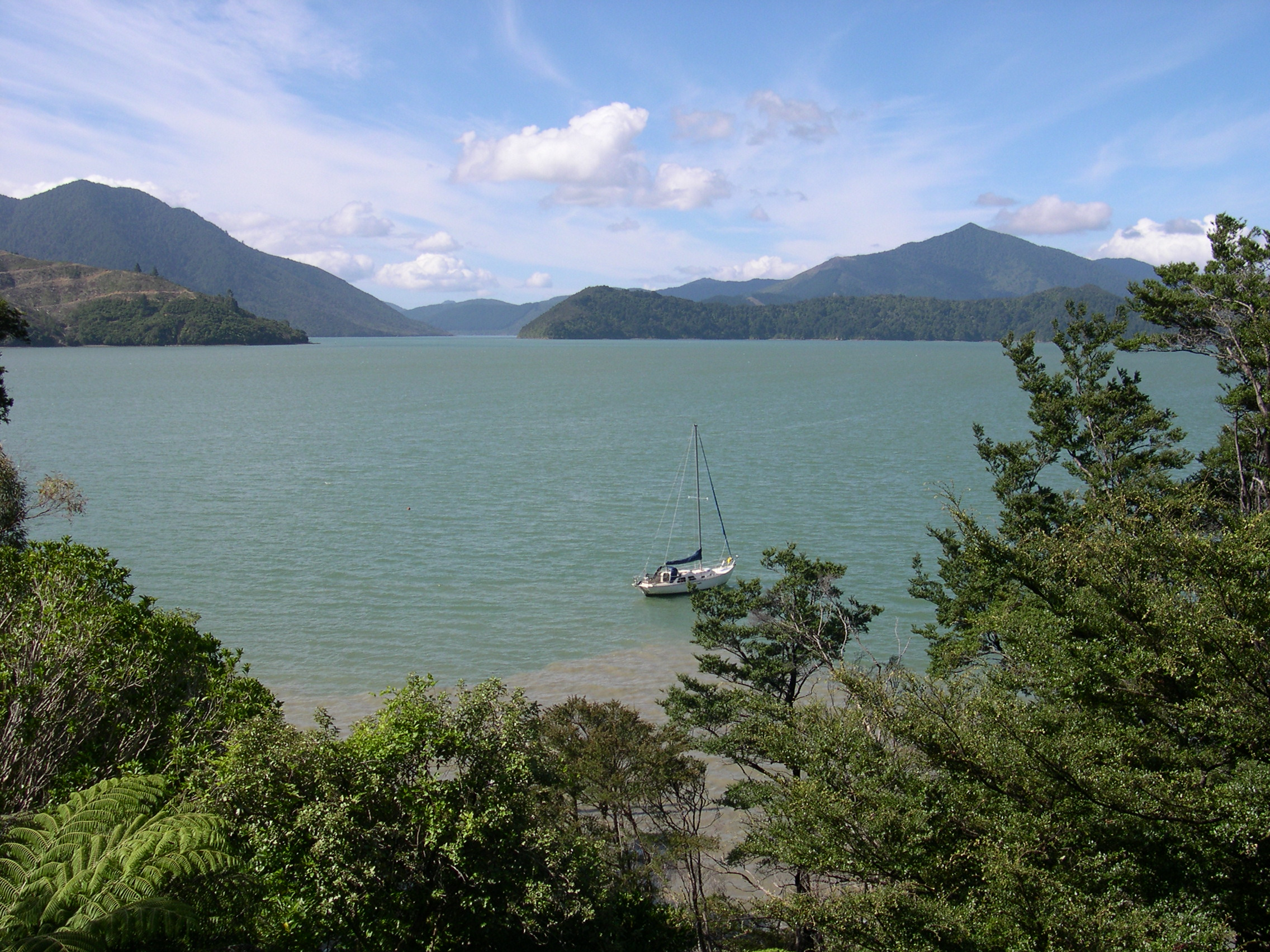
- Moetapu Bay in inner Pelorus Sound / Te Hoiere

- Pelorus Sound is the largest of the Marlborough Sounds Pelorus Sound / Te Hoiere (New Zealand)
- Location: Marlborough Region, New Zealand
- Coordinates: 41.168575°S 173.868542°E
- Type: Ria
- Part of: Marlborough Sounds
- Max. length: 55 kilometres (34 mi)
- Shore length^{1}: 380 kilometres (240 mi)
- Islands: Maud Island
- Settlements: Havelock
- ^{1} Shore length is not a well-defined measure.

Pelorus Sound (Māori: Te Hoiere; officially Pelorus Sound / Te Hoiere) is the largest of the sounds which make up the Marlborough Sounds at the north of the South Island, New Zealand.

The Marlborough Sounds is a system of drowned river valleys, which were formed after the last ice age around 10,000 years ago. Pelorus Sound has a main channel which winds south from Cook Strait for about 55 kilometres (34 mi), between steeply sloped wooded hills, until it reaches its head close to the Havelock township. Pelorus has several major arms, notably Tennyson Inlet, Tawhitinui Reach, Kenepuru Sound and the Crail/Clova/Beatrix Bay complex. Its shoreline runs for 380 kilometres (240 mi).

Industry in Pelorus Sounds is based around marine farming, pine forestry and some tourism. Private holiday homes are becoming more common. Most of the settled places are hard to reach overland, and are serviced by the Pelorus Express, a mail boat which does three different weekly runs from Havelock.

Maud Island, also called Te Hoiere in the Māori language, is a 310-hectare (770-acre) island in the Pelorus Sounds. It is an important nature reserve to which only scientists and conservationists have access.

== History ==
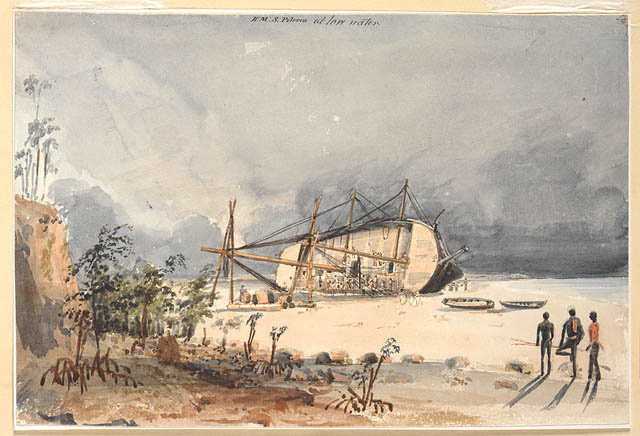
The Cruizer-class brig-sloop HMS Pelorus aground at low water. Pelorus Sound is named after this ship.

The local iwi (tribe) of the indigenous people of New Zealand is the Ngāti Kuia. According to Ngāti Kuia oral tradition, their founding father, a descendant of Kupe, came to the South Island in his waka Te Hoiere.

In 1642, Abel Tasman sailed past D'Urville Island. French and Russian explorers followed and in the 1770s Captain James Cook arrived.

In 1838, Philip Chetwode in command of the Cruizer-class brig-sloop, HMS Pelorus, carried out the first survey of Pelorus Sound. The sound was named in honour of this survey. A pelorus was a navigational instrument used on sailing ships. The instrument, in turn, was named after the pilot for Hannibal, circa 203 BC.

In 1864, gold was discovered in the Wakamarina Valley and, for a brief time, Havelock became a boom town as several thousand prospectors flooded the area.

In 1865, the first timber mill started at Mahikipawa, an upper arm of Pelorus Sound. More mills were established, and native timber was shipped around New Zealand and to Australia. By the start of the 20th century the timber camps had largely given way to dairy and sheep farms. In 1939 the last mill was closed. About 325 million feet of timber had been sawn over a period of sixty years, and only two small areas of native timber remained.

In 1888, a Risso's dolphin appeared in the sounds. This dolphin became famous as Pelorus Jack and became the first dolphin in the world to receive the protection of the law. Pelorus Jack would accompany boats to and from the notorious French Pass. He would join boats bound for Nelson at the entrance to Pelorus Sound and for eight kilometres would ride their bow waves to Pelorus Sound. He did not go through the pass with them, but would meet returning boats as they exited the pass. Pelorus Jack was last seen in April 1912. The lightkeeper at French Pass claimed he found the body of Pelorus Jack decomposing on the shore.

During World War II, coastal fortifications were constructed on Maud Island to protect Cook Strait, and the entrance to the sound. These fortifications included a 6in Mk 7 gun emplacement, and range finding equipment that is still there.

In 1906, New Zealand purchased its first naval ship, a sail training ship called NZS Amokura. It became a coal hulk in 1922, and in 1953 was towed into St Omer Bay in Kenepuru Sound, an arm of Pelorus Sound. It was used there as a store hulk and jetty. Reported broken up in 1955, her remains lie on the beach in the southern end of the bay.

In August 2014, the name of the sound was officially altered to Pelorus Sound / Te Hoiere.

== Industry ==
=== Marine farming ===
Over 80 percent of New Zealand's aquaculture exports - worth more than $NZ 200 million per annum - come from the Marlborough Sounds. Most of the marine farms are in Pelorus Sound. Most of the exports involve green-lipped mussels.

A New Zealand sea sponge, Mycale hentscheli, which grows in Pelorus Sound, may hold the key to an anti-cancer drug. Scientists are working to see how peloruside, a substance produced by the sponges, might be used as a cancer-fighting drug. Marine farmers are helping Victoria University of Wellington and NIWA develop a method for growing the sponge on an existing mussel farm.

Trial mussel farms began in the Marlborough Sounds in the late 1960s. In the Pelorus Sound waters, mussel farms started in Kenepuru Sound and in Crail Bay. Subsequently, Pelorus has become the major mussel-producing area in New Zealand. Initially, the mussels were cultured on ropes suspended from rafts. It was a labour-intensive method which has since been replaced with a modified Japanese longline system, where mussel spat is packed into stockings and suspended from parallel rows of looped ropes, supported by buoys.

In 1981 the first specially designed mussel-processing factory started operations at Havelock, at the head of the sounds. Havelock has become the main centre for landing harvested mussels, with other smaller processing plants at French Pass, Elaine Bay, Okiwi Bay and Rai Valley. People are needed to manage and work the farms, and to harvest and transport the mussels to the processing plants. As a result, the mussel-farming industry has become closely linked to several local communities.

Heavy rain can result in high sediment-levels in rivers and land runoff, and can contain bacterial contamination from livestock. This can result in mussel-farming areas being closed to harvesting. Applications to increase mussel farms in Admiralty Bay have been successfully opposed on the grounds that the area is a special feeding site for the dusky dolphin. A claim has been made, and a study carried out in New Zealand, that marine farms may affect the feeding ability of Dusky dolphins which round up shoals of schooling fish such as pilchard. The farming of Chinook Salmon also occurs in the outer Pelorus, with sites at Bulwer and the Waitata Reach. Salmon farming in the sounds is likely to expand in future years into the Cook Strait.

=== Pine forestry ===
Since the 1970s, large areas of exotic (pine) forest have been planted around the sounds. Bulk timber is exported from a deep-water berth in Shakespeare Bay to the west of Picton.

== Māori ==
The indigenous people of New Zealand are the Māori. The local iwi, Ngāti Kuia, Ngāti Koata and Ngāti Toa have engaged in marine farming with the aim of supplying better employment for their people. They are concerned about protecting their sacred sites, and about the environmental effects of industrial scale marine farming. They have objected to some development projects, such as a mussel farm in an area where their people are starting to return to the land, and a proposed harbour development at Havelock, where the local dump was located near sites and a waterway sacred to Ngati Kuia. Māori groups are becoming better resourced through settlements and income from fisheries quotas. They are more active at looking after their interests. Community tensions have increased, with some interests feeling Māori hold up development.

== Tides and currents ==
There have been several hydrographic studies in Pelorus Sound. These show the importance of the large, variable freshwater input into Pelorus Sound. The Sound has 380 kilometres (240 mi) of shoreline and an area of 290 square kilometres (110 mi^{2}). Average freshwater input is 99 cubic metres per second (3,500 cu ft/s), of which the Pelorus and Kaituna Rivers at the head of the sound deliver 43 and 5 cubic metres per second (1,520 and 180 cu ft/s) respectively. Rain falling directly on the surface of the sound provides another 14 cubic metres per second (490 cu ft/s), and the remainder drains from adjacent land via small streams.

This freshwater input corresponds to a depth of 10.8 metres (35 ft) of water distributed over the area of the sound per year. The freshwater input is highly variable. In a typical year there are several events where the daily rainfall exceeds 50 millimetres (2.0 in) and the river flow exceeds 400 cubic metres per second (14,000 cu ft/s). The freshwater inflow generates an estuarine circulation in the main channel, with low-salinity water moving outwards at the surface, and higher-salinity water flowing inwards below. The currents in the main channel associated with this circulation are typically 0.05 to 0.15 metres per second (0.16 to 0.49 ft/s), but immediately after a flood event they can be much larger. Fresh water layers have been observed to spread through the Sound at 0.9 metres per second (3.0 ft/s). After each flood event, the freshwater is slowly flushed out of the sound, with a flushing time estimated to be 21 days.

The tidal regime at the entrance to Pelorus Sound is typical of New Zealand coastal locations, i.e. there is a semi-diurnal tide modulated on a spring-neap cycle, generated by the superposition of M2 (lunar, semi-diurnal) and S2 (solar, semi-diurnal) tidal constituents. Other tidal constituents, notably N2 (semi-diurnal, generated by the ellipticity of the Moon's orbit), introduce further modulation, meaning that the spring-neap cycle is not exactly repeated. The tidal range varies between 1.0 and 1.3 metres (3.3 and 4.3 ft) at neap and 2.1 and 2.4 metres (6.9 and 7.9 ft) at spring. (These values are calculated from a sea level time series, July 1997 – February 1998, at Pelorus Sound entrance.) The propagation of this tidal signal into Pelorus Sound has not been well described, but models and measurements both suggest that the tidal range within the sound is somewhat larger (by 10–20%) than at the entrance. Because the sound is long, and in places narrow, the tidal currents are fairly strong.

A further factor affecting the hydrodynamics of Pelorus Sound is wind. Winds in the area are generally strong and are channelled by the steep topography. Wind stress acting on the surface generates currents, which have not been well described. The wind stress also generates turbulence, which causes the surface fresh water to be mixed down and results in a brackish layer typically 5 to 15 metres (16 to 49 ft) thick. The interface, called a pycnocline, between the brackish near-surface water and the denser water below supports internal wave motion.

Waves on the pycnocline, called internal waves, are ubiquitous in Pelorus Sound. They propagate at 1 metre per second (3.3 ft/s) and involve vertical displacements of the pycnocline through 5 metres (16 ft). They are often generated by the tide, in which case they are called internal tides. They play an important part in driving flow and horizontal exchange in bays off the main channel. For example, current metre records at the entrance to Beatrix Bay show a significant semi-diurnal component with velocities up to 0.2 metres per second (0.7 ft/s). This is not simple, uniform tidal flow in and out of the bay because its amplitude does not follow a spring-neap cycle and there is a phase difference of several hours between the surface and the bottom.

== Timeline ==
- Mists of time: The founding father of the Ngāti Kuia arrives in the South Island in his canoe Te Hoiere
- 1642: Abel Tasman sails past D'Urville Island.
- Late 17th century: French and Russian explorers arrive.
- 1770s: Captain James Cook arrives.
- 1827: Jules Dumont d'Urville has a disconcerting ride through French Pass in the French Navy corvette Astrolabe.
- 1838: HMS Pelorus, carries out the first survey. The sound is named in honour of this survey.
- 1864: Gold is discovered in the Wakamarina Valley, and briefly Havelock becomes a boom town.
- 1865: Milling of native timber begins
- 1870: A flax mill starts operating on the Ruapeka Stream
- 1888: First appearance of the dolphin Pelorus Jack.
- c. 1900: The timber camps are giving way to dairy and sheep farms.
- 1912: Pelorus Jack dies.
- 1939: The last native timber mill closes. Only two small areas of native timber remain
- 1942: Coastal fortifications are constructed on Maud Island to protect Cook Strait, and the entrance to the sound.
- 1953: NZS Amokura, New Zealand's first naval ship, is towed into St Omer Bay in Kenepuru Sound, an arm of Pelorus Sound, and retired on the beach, where her remains lie to this day.
- 1960s: There is a general decline in wet fish and scallop harvests, as some wild fisheries collapse due to overfishing.
- Late 1960s: Mussel farming begins.
- 1981: The first specially designed mussel processing factory is established at Havelock.

== See also ==
- Fairy Bay, a small settlement and camping area within the Sound
- Tawero Point

== Further references ==
- Rutland, Joshua (1900) "On the Regrowth of the Totara" Transactions and Proceedings of the Royal Society of New Zealand, 33: 324–327.
