= List of superior administrators of the French Southern and Antarctic Lands =

This article lists, in chronological order, the French senior officials who have held the post of superior administrator (administrateur supérieur) of the French Southern and Antarctic Lands, also known as the prefect (préfet) since 2004.

== History ==
The post of superior administrator was created in 1955, via the law giving the French Southern and Antarctic Lands the status of an overseas territory. After 40 years of administering the territory from Paris, the superior administrator role was moved to Saint-Pierre, Réunion, in 1997.

French administration of the French Southern and Antarctic Lands
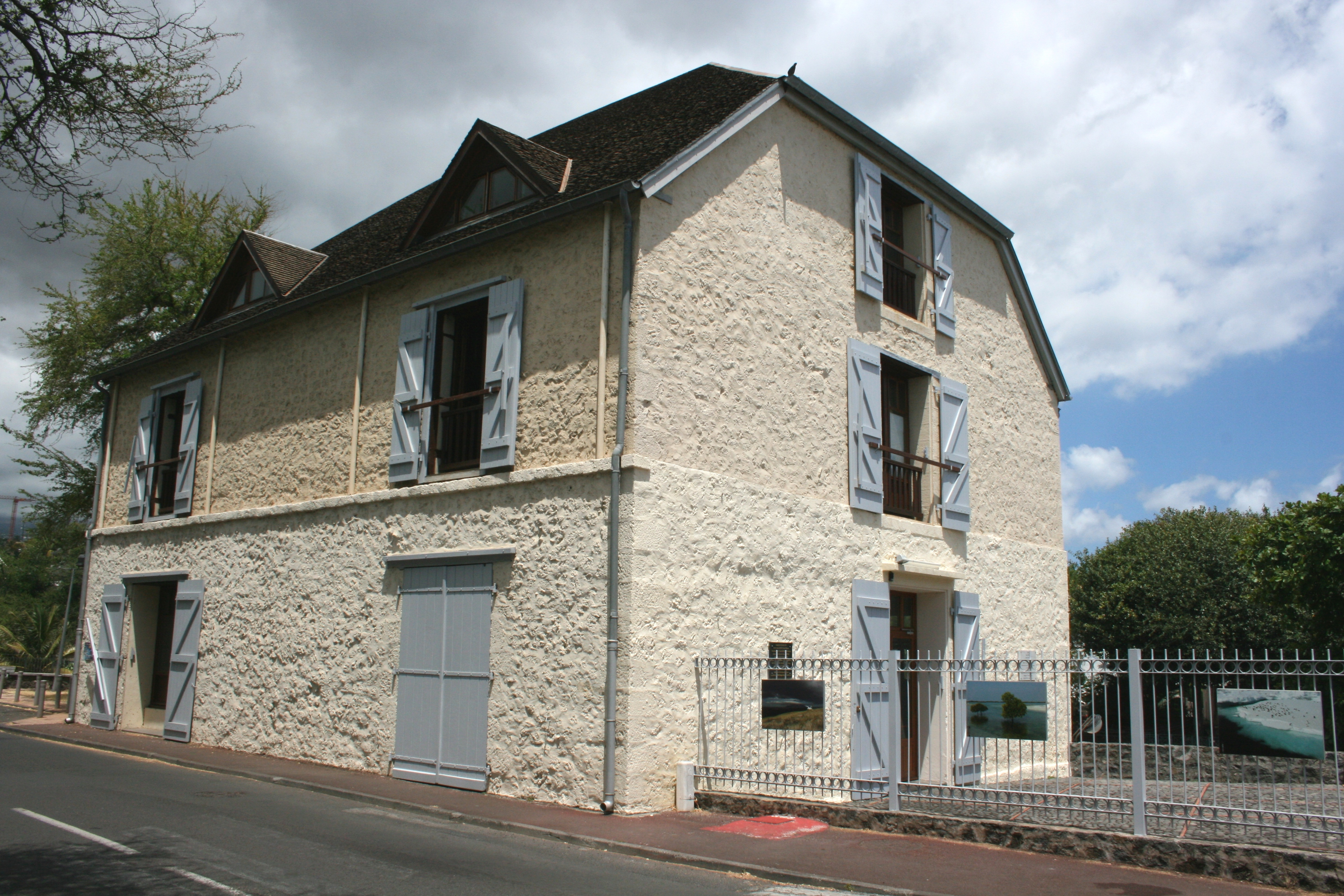
The administrative building in Réunion

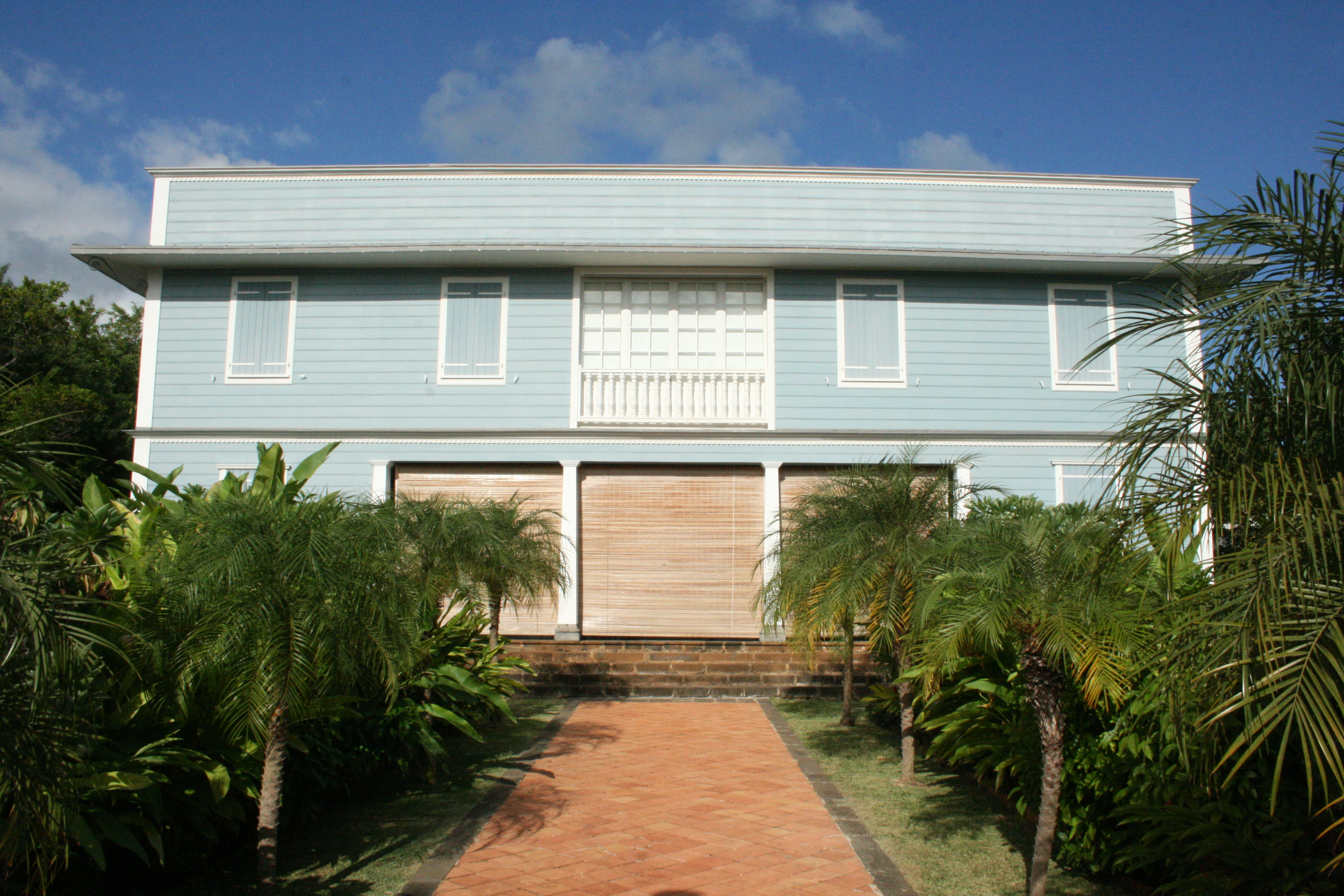
The administrator's residence in Réunion

== Nicknames ==
Because there is no permanent population in the French Southern and Antarctic Lands, the administrator is often nicknamed préfet des manchots (prefect of the penguins) or préfet des albatros (prefect of the albatrosses). In the Taafien jargon used among those working on or with the territory, the administrator is known as the "adsup," short for administrateur supérieur.

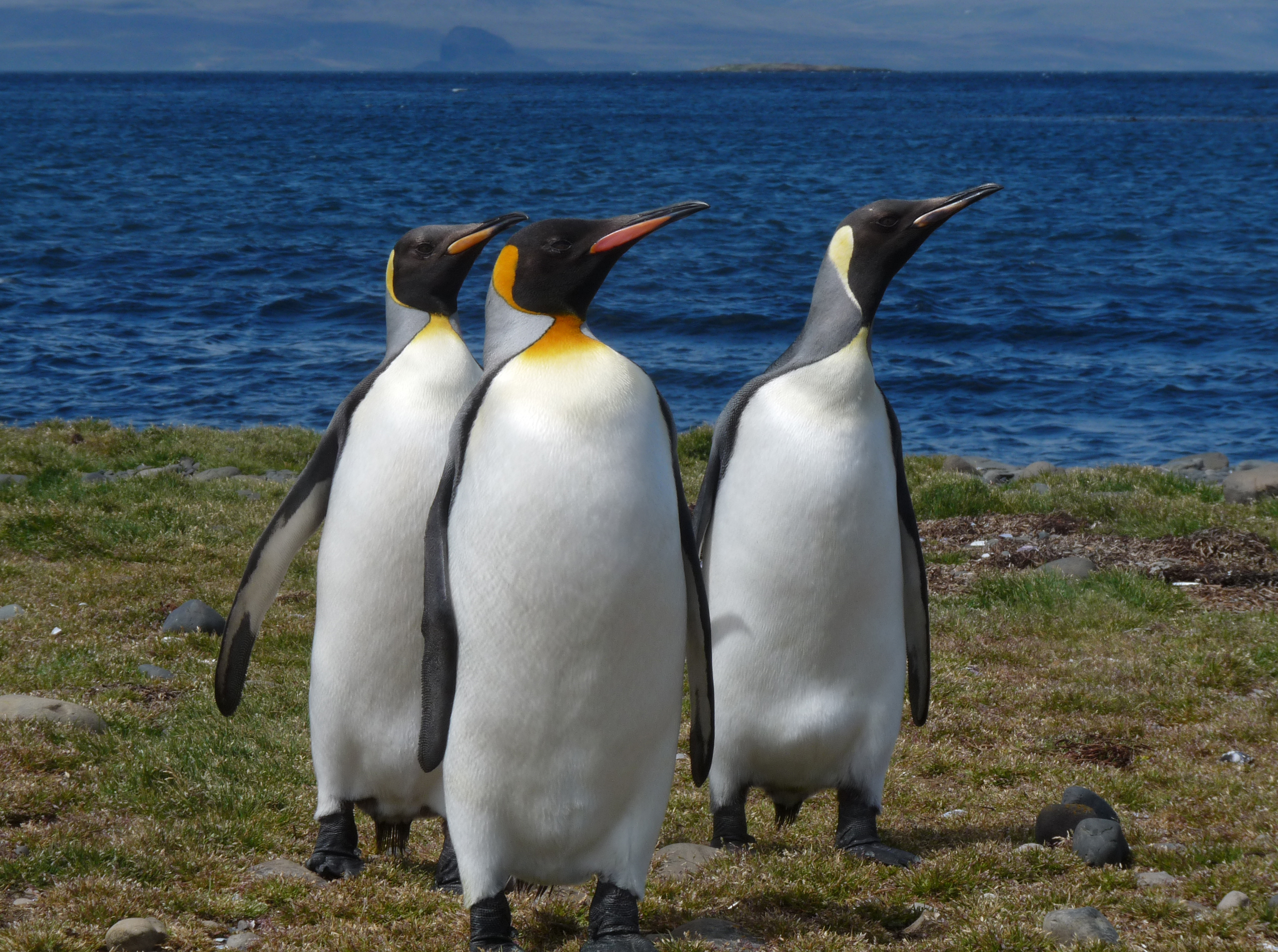
Penguins in the Kerguelen Islands

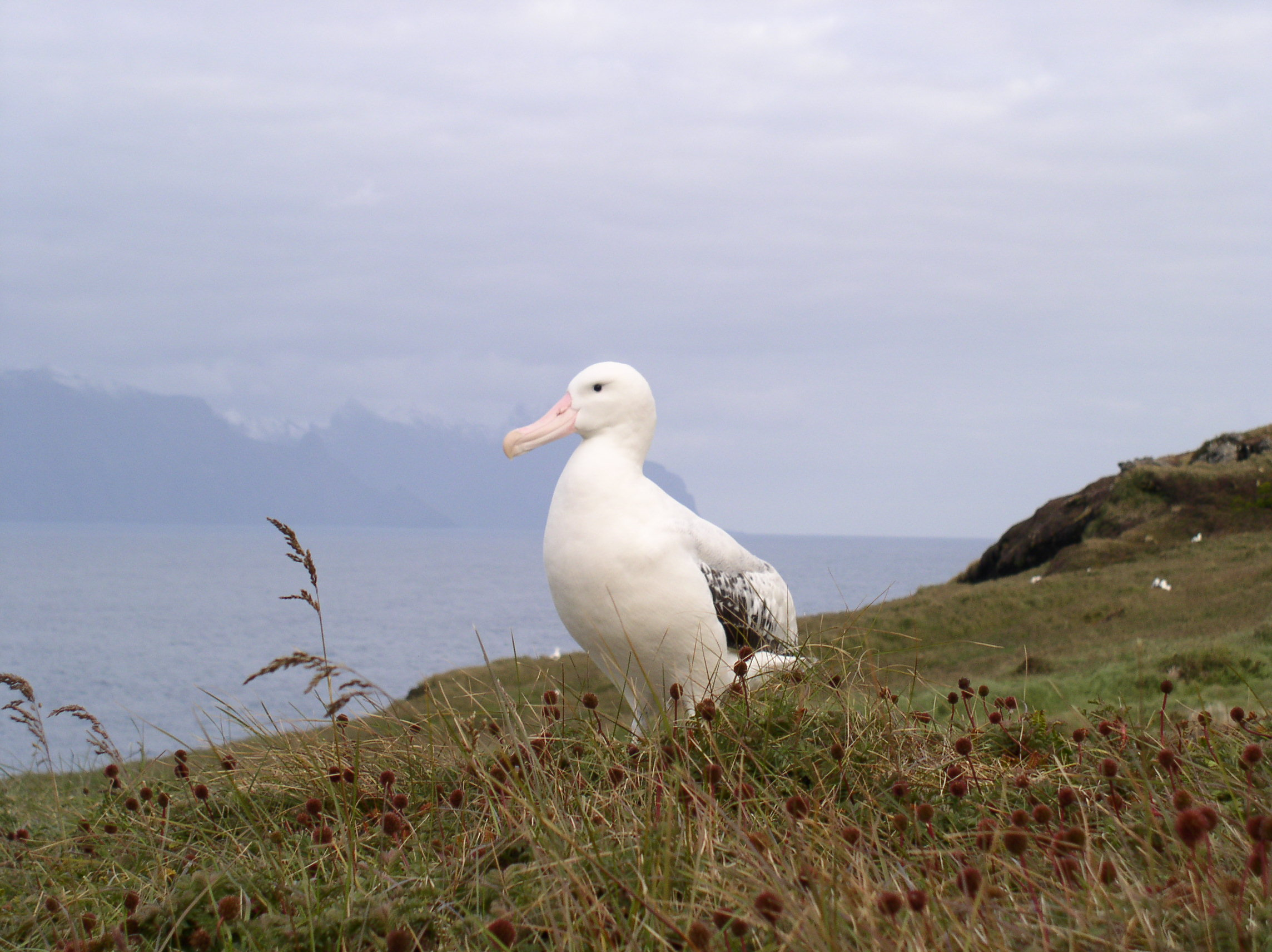
An albatross on the Île de la Possession

== List of administrators ==
Date of appointment	Name	Photograph
Superior administrators
September 15, 1955	Xavier Richert	
December 23, 1958	Pierre Charles Rolland	
July 4, 1973	Roger Barberot	
September 5, 1979	Francis Jacquemont	
March 11, 1982	Claude Pieri	
March 27, 1987	Claude Corbier	
May 21, 1990	Bernard de Gouttes Lastouzeilles	
December 4, 1991	Christian Dors	
March 14, 1996	Pierre Lise	
March 25, 1998	Brigitte Girardin	
May 25, 2000	François Garde	
Prefects
December 20, 2004	Michel Champon	
March 8, 2007	Éric Pilloton	
September 3, 2008	Rollon Mouchel-Blaisot	
October 11, 2010	Christian Gaudin	
March 1, 2012	Pascal Bolot	
September 18, 2014	Cécile Pozzo di Borgo	
October 30, 2018	Évelyne Decorps	
September 16, 2020	Charles Giusti	
October 5, 2022	Florence Jeanblanc-Risler	
