= Moutere Ihupuku / Campbell Island Marine Reserve =

Marine reserve in New Zealand territory

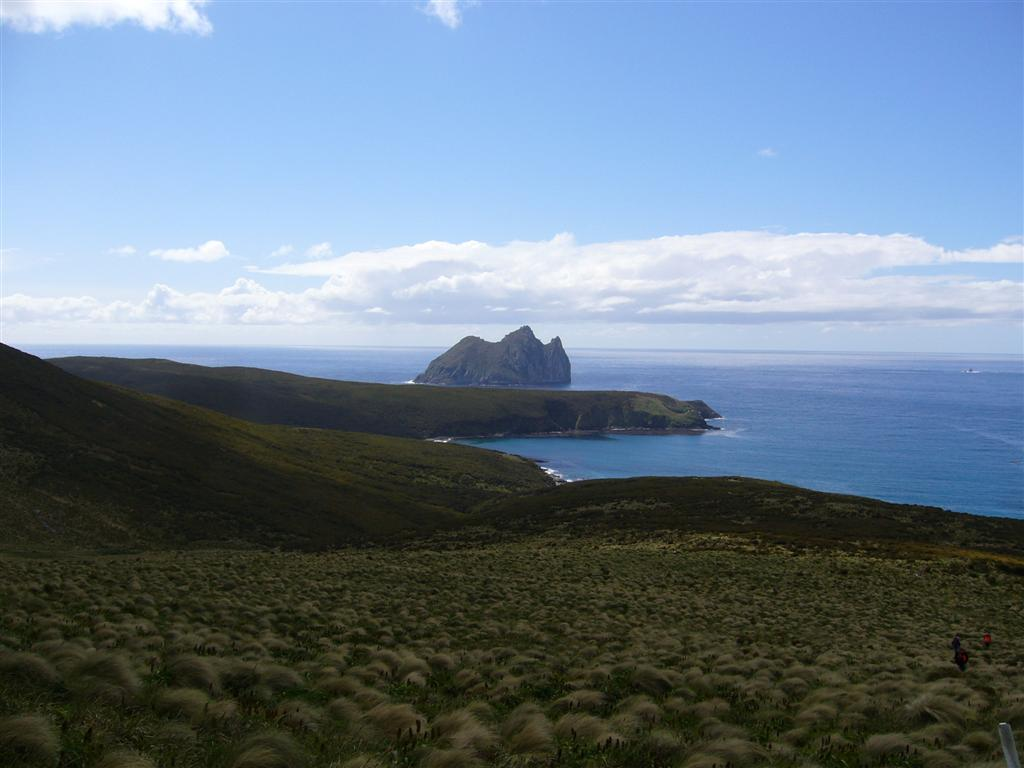
- Campbell island and Dent Island

- Location within Pacific Ocean
- Location: Subantarctic Islands, New Zealand
- Nearest city: Invercargill
- Coordinates: 52.5371648°S 169.002156°E
- Governing body: Department of Conservation

Moutere Ihupuku / Campbell Island Marine Reserve or Campbell Island / Moutere Ihupuku Marine Reserve is a marine reserve around Campbell island in the New Zealand Subantarctic Islands.

It is administered by the Department of Conservation with assistance from the Royal New Zealand Navy.

Visitors are allowed on guided tours, but must have a permit and follow rules to keep their impact to a minimum.

== Geography ==
Campbell island is New Zealand's southern-most island, located 660 kilometres south of the South Island. It also includes an area of sea about 100 metres around the island its islets, and an area of territorial sea about 200 metres deep.

The island consists of the eroded remains of a shield volcano, with large cliffs, boulder beaches and some sandy beaches, with sheltered inlets, exposed rocky reef and deep soft sediment. Underwater surveys have identified pinnacles of basalt, extensive sponge beds, seaweed-encrusted reefs, and boulder fields with an abundance of very large spider crabs.

== History ==
The reserve was established on 2 March 2014, on the same day as the Moutere Mahue / Antipodes Island Marine Reserve and Moutere Hauriri / Bounty Islands Marine Reserve.

The reserve occupies 39% of the territorial sea of the island group. Bottom trawling, seining and dredging are also banned in the remaining 61% of the territorial seas.

In 2018, following a review of the marine reserve and consultation with Ngāi Tahu and Te Ohu Kaimoana, the Government opted not to extent the reserve to the remaining 61% of territorial seas.

== Wildlife ==
The marine reserve has the world's largest population of the Southern royal albatross, and has globally significant breeding grounds for five other albatross and mollyhawk species. Rockhopper penguins, New Zealand sea lions, Southern elephant seals and New Zealand fur seals also breed around the islands.

Marine mammals and seabirds often forage close to shore if they have young to feed. Some species forage over thousands of kilometres before returning to land.

== See also ==
- Marine reserves of New Zealand
