= Shimane Aquarium =

Shimane AQUAS Aquarium
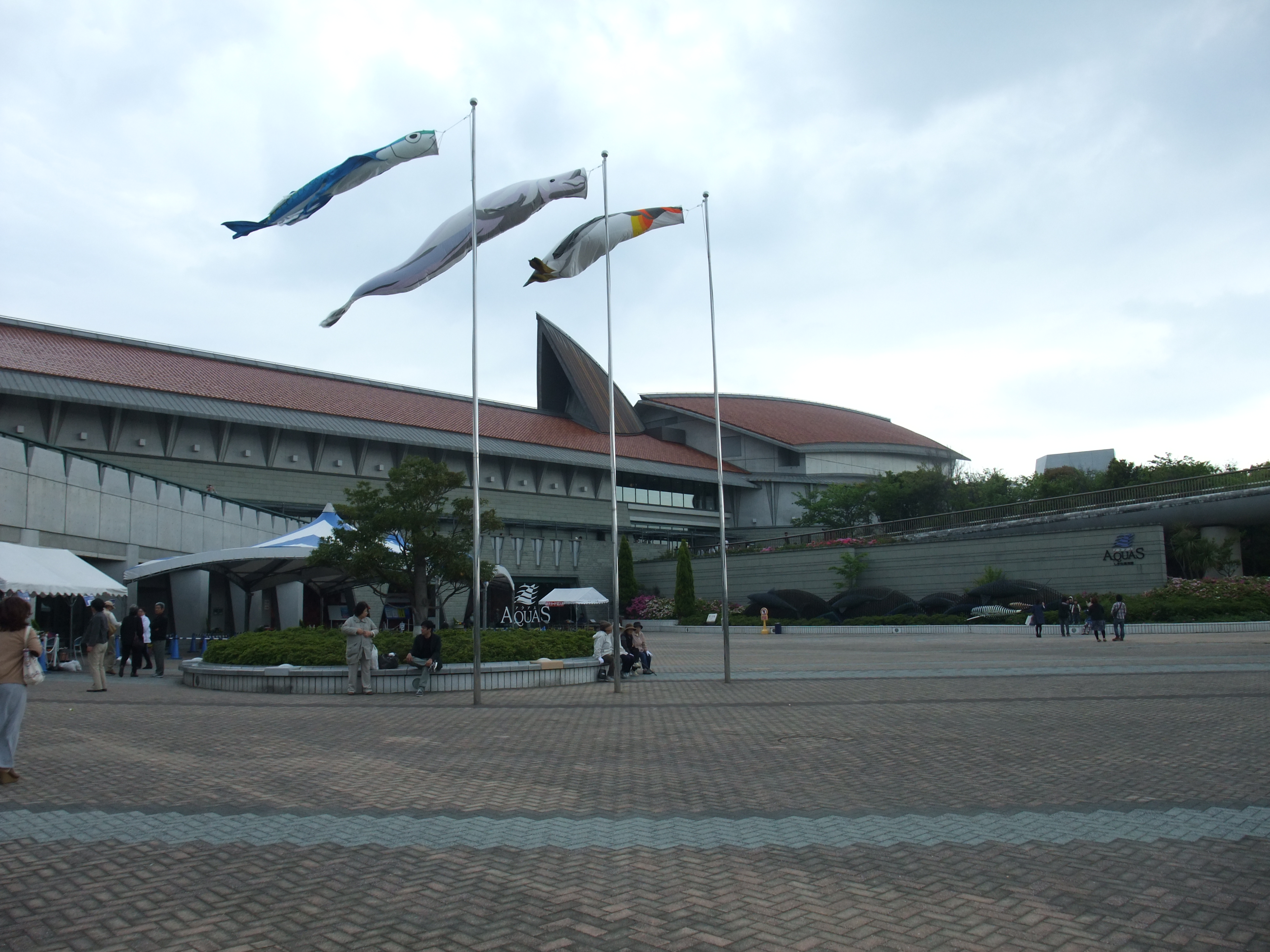
- Exterior
- Interactive map of Shimane AQUAS Aquarium
- 34°28′54″N 136°50′45″E
- Date opened: April 2000
- Location: Hamada City and Gotsu City, Shimane Prefecture, Japan
- Land area: 14,000 m^{2} (150,000 sq ft)
- No. of animals: 10,000
- No. of species: 400
- Total volume of tanks: 4,280,000 litres (1,131,000 US gal)
- Memberships: JAZA
- Website: aquas.or.jp/en/

Shimane Aquarium or Shimane AQUAS Aquarium (島根県立しまね海洋館, Shimane kenritsu Shimane kaiyokan) is a prefectural public aquarium located in Hamada City and Gotsu City, Shimane Prefecture, Japan. It is managed and operated by the Shimane Aquarium Foundation. It is a member of the Japanese Association of Zoos and Aquariums (JAZA), and the aquarium is accredited as a designated facilities by the Ministry of Education, Culture, Sports, Science and Technology.

== History ==
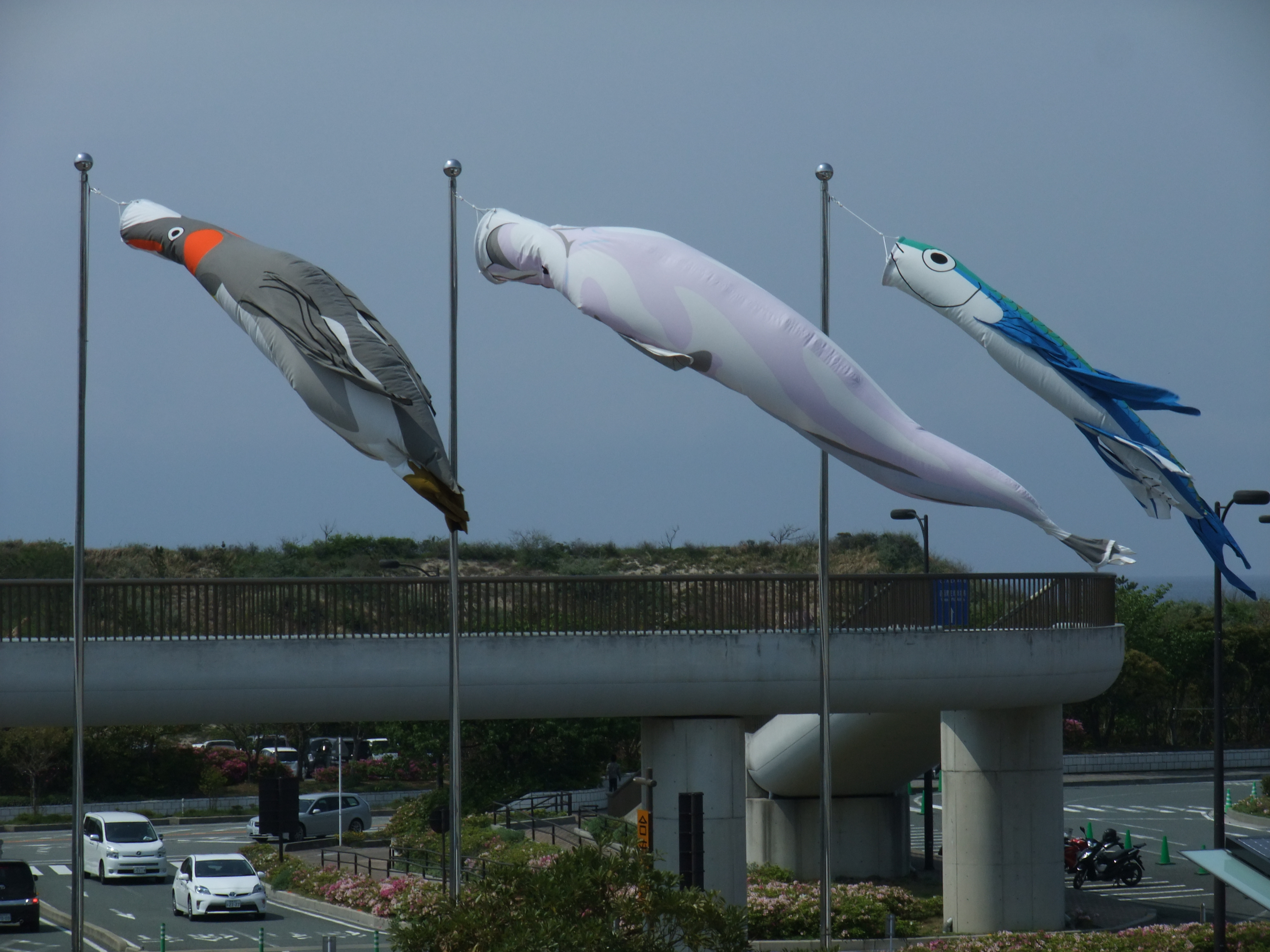
The aquarium is hung with carp streamers in the shape of penguins, beluga whales, and flying fish.

It opened on April 15, 2000. It is one of the largest aquariums in the Chugoku and Shikoku regions, and its concept is "From the Sea of Shimane to the Sea of Japan and the World".

On November 13, 2008, the "Penguin Pavilion" opened on the west side of the main building, and in April 2008, during the construction of the Penguin Pavilion, an accident occurred in which the acrylic panels used for the aquarium tanks were damaged. The acrylic panels were custom-made, which delayed the construction schedule, and the opening was postponed from July 2008 to mid-November 2008.

The Penguin Pavilion's water tank uses an inverted L-shaped acrylic panel, a rarity in Japan, so that visitors can see penguins swimming in front of and above their heads. There are four kinds of king penguins, gentoo penguins, rockhopper penguins, and Humboldt penguins.

=== Beluga Whale and Bubble Ring ===
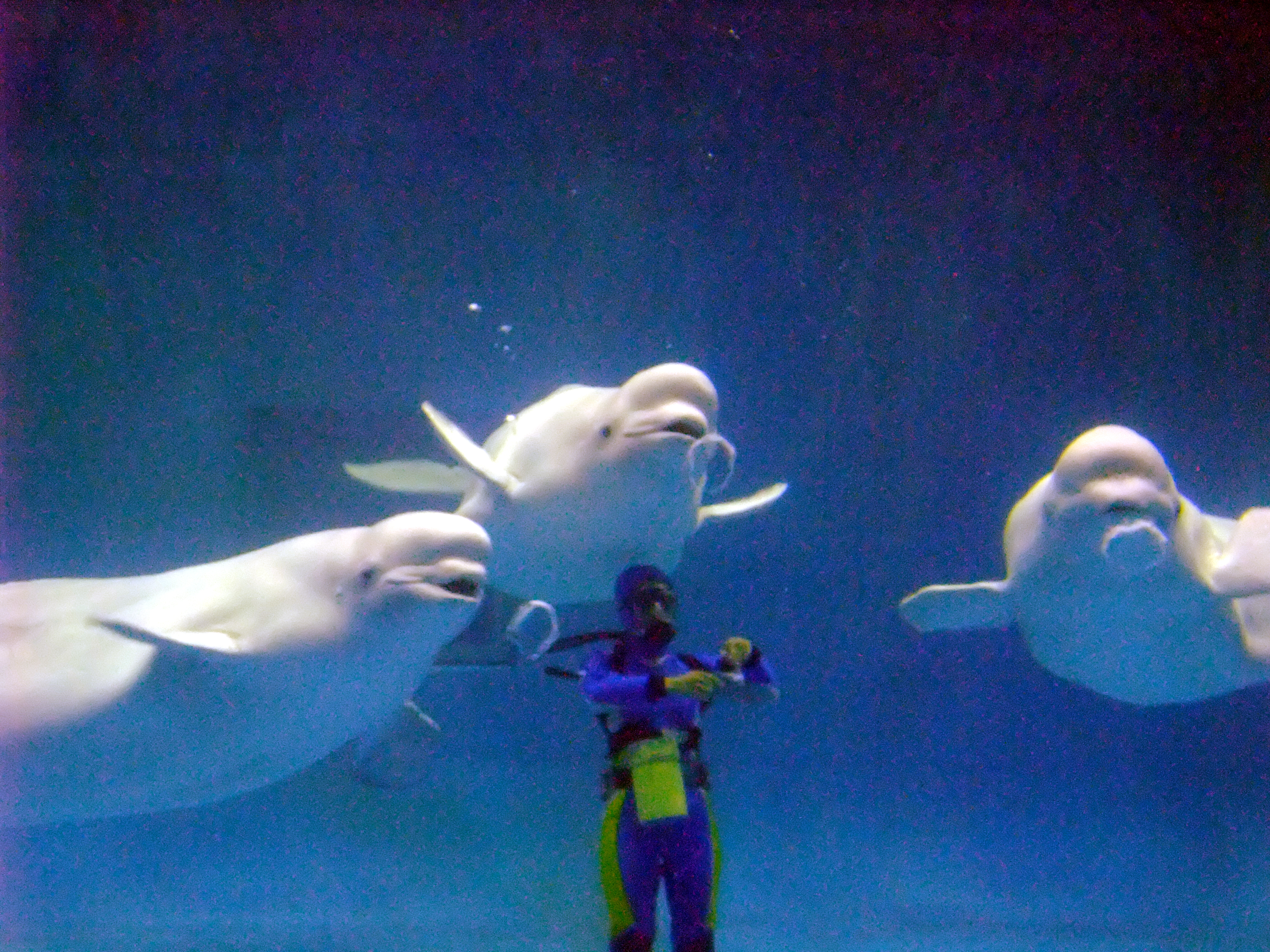
bubble ring

The aquarium has captivity beluga whales since its opening. In 2009, two beluga whales became pregnant and gave birth. two more beluga whales gave birth in 2014 and are confirmed to be pregnant in 2023.

The aquarium was the first to initiate the beluga whale bubble ring performance. Arya (female) began playing in the bubble ring in the summer of 2005. In May 2007, the three beluga whales, Nascha (female) and Kailya (male), who are currently living together, planned to bubble ring at the same time, and as a result of repeated training, they have been available for public viewing since July 2007 and have been widely introduced overseas.

In October 2007, one of the beluga whales, "Kailya," appeared in a Softbank commercial as a bubbling dolphin. This bubbling performance was also featured in a Softbank commercial in October 2007. The bubbling performance was suspended for about two years after April 2009 due to the birth of a female beluga whale.

Instead, it was possible to see the parent and child beluga whales swimming in the new beluga whale pool that opened in April 2011. Performances resumed on December 16, 2011, and the following year, the young beluga whales also made their show debut.

== Gallery ==
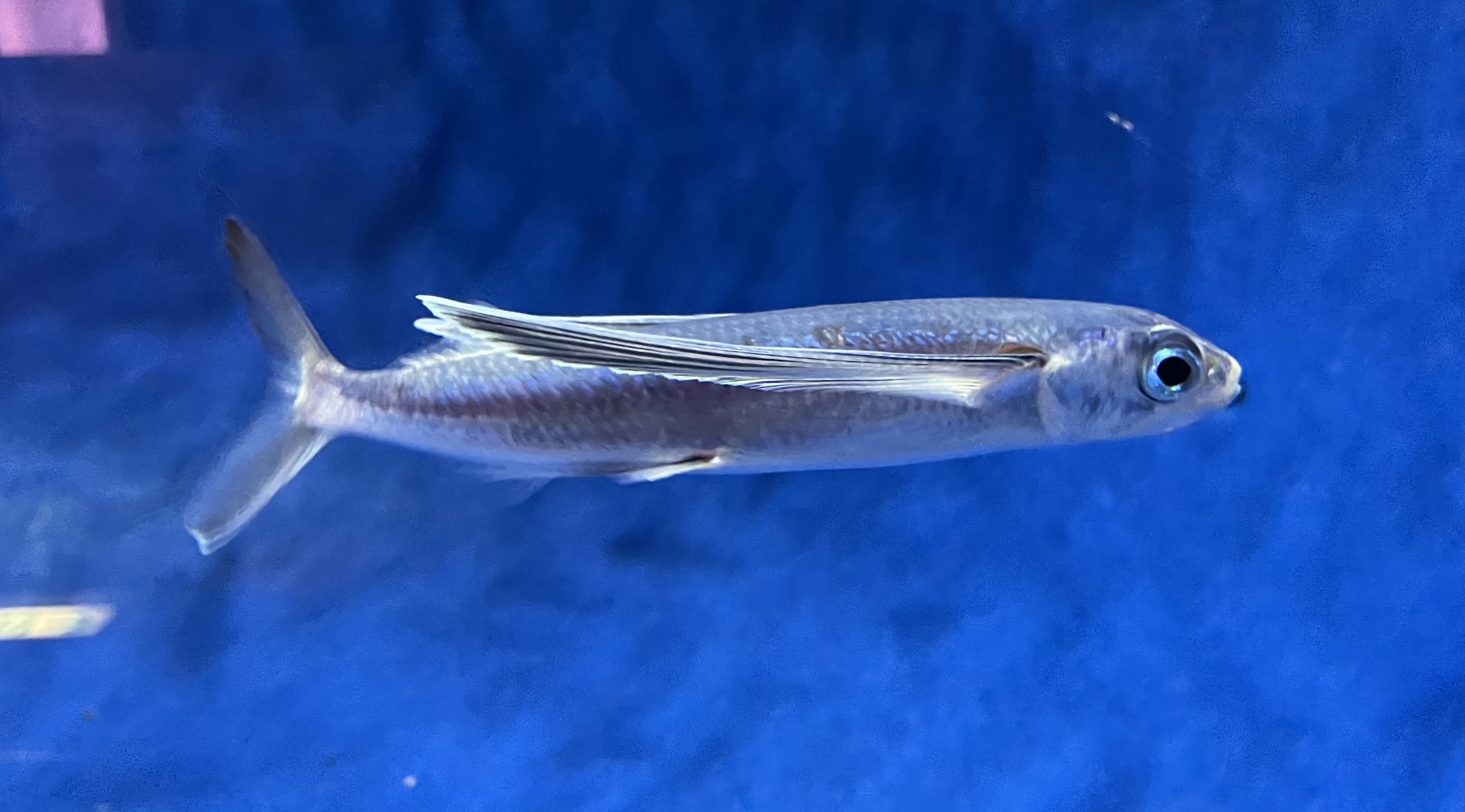

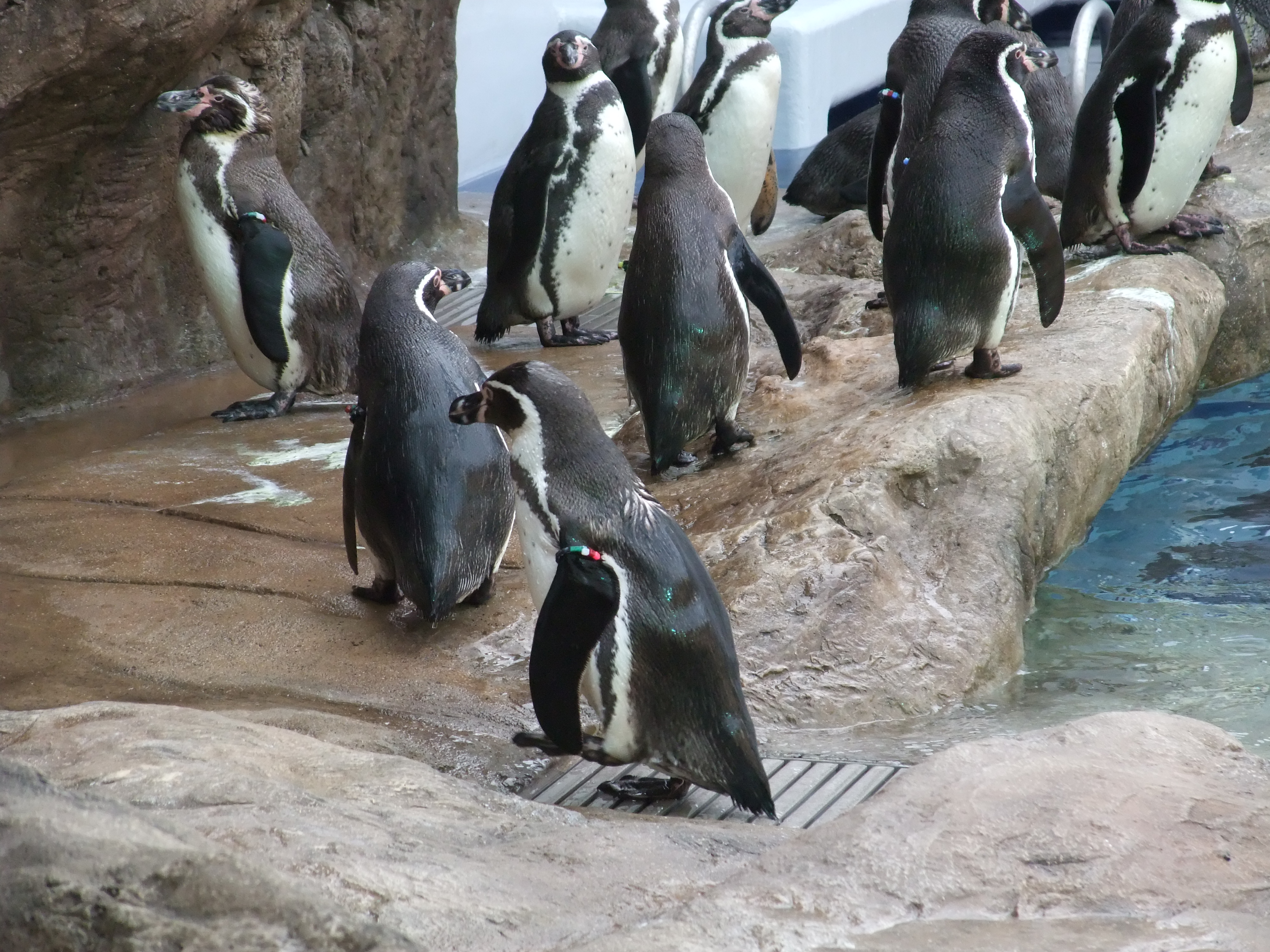

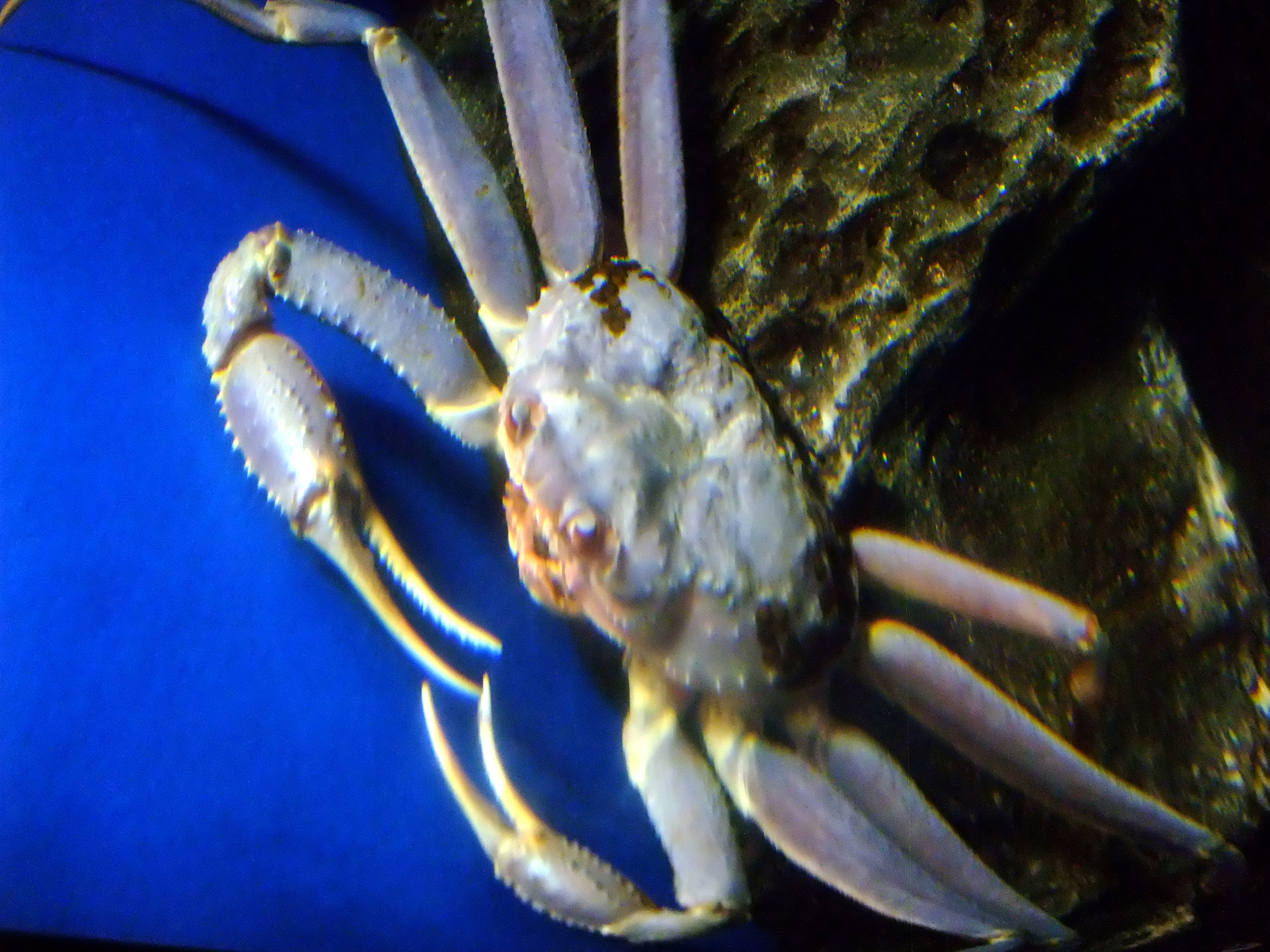

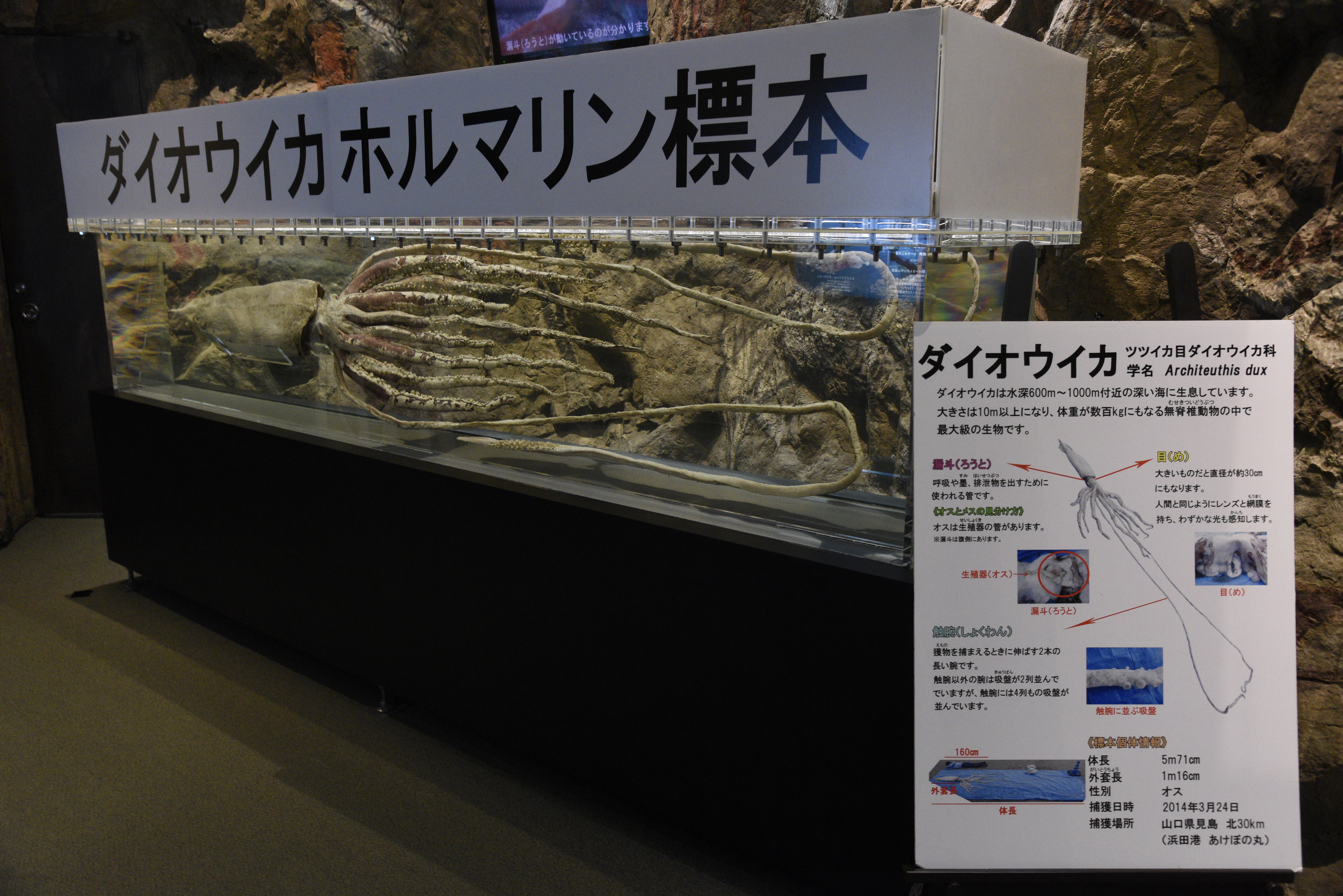

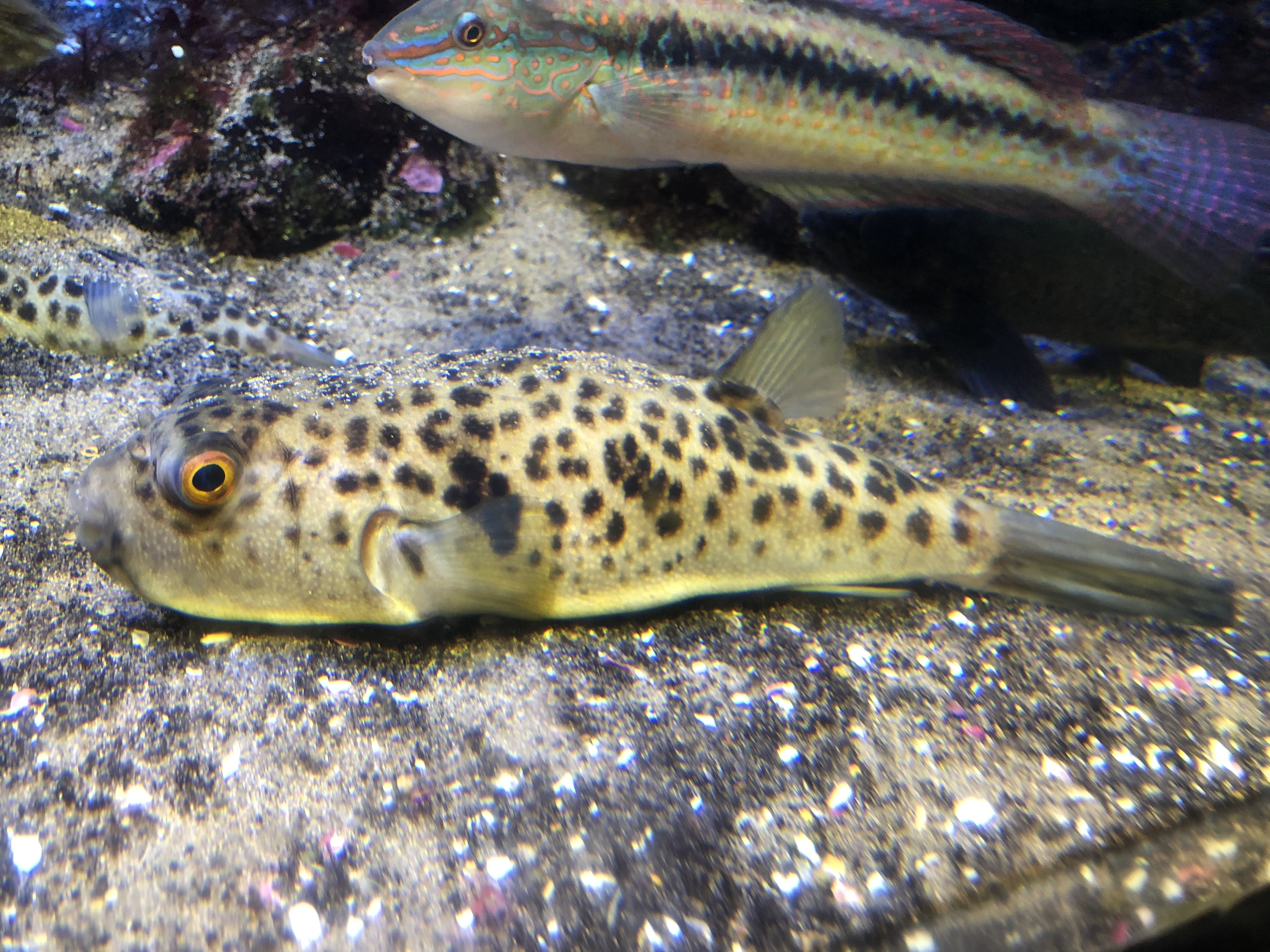

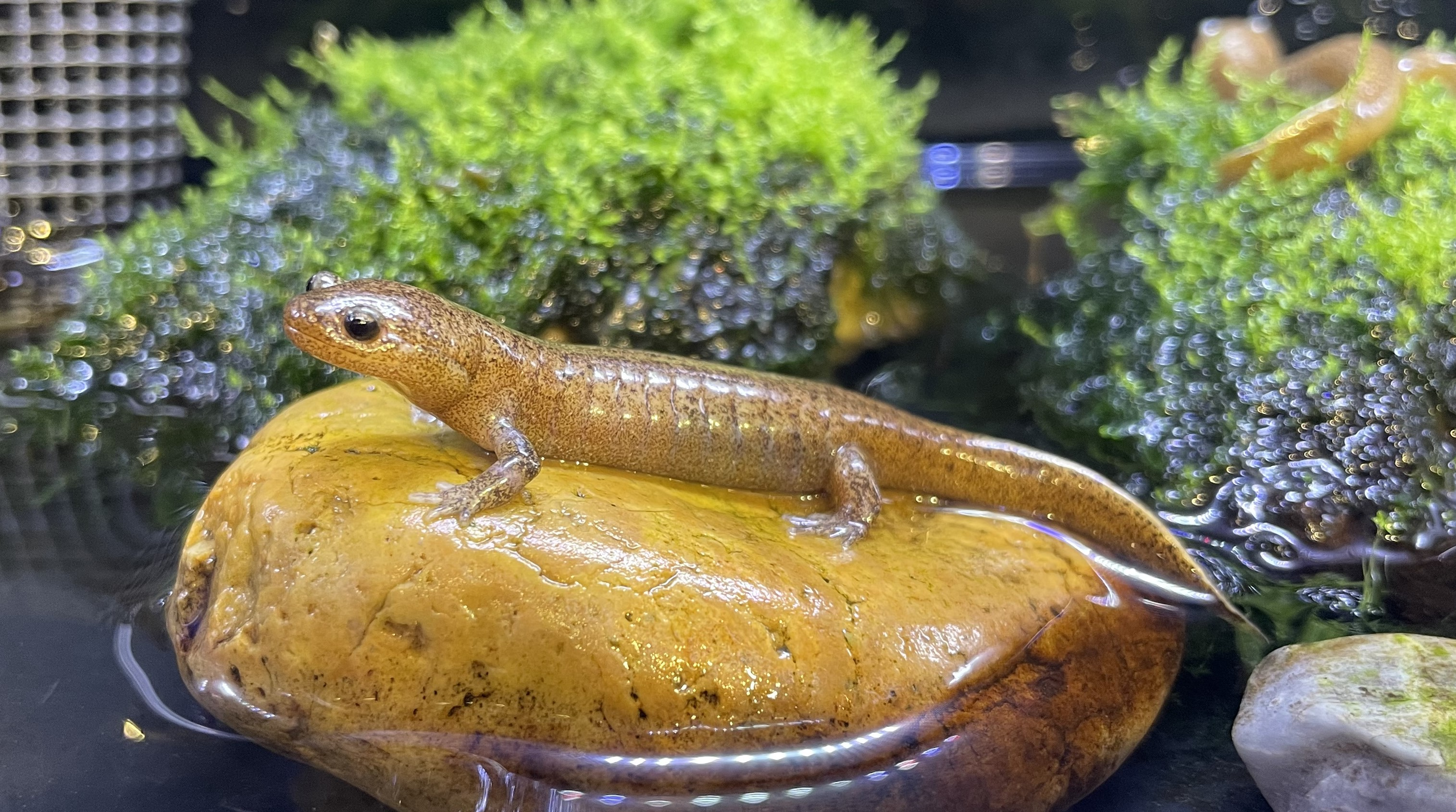

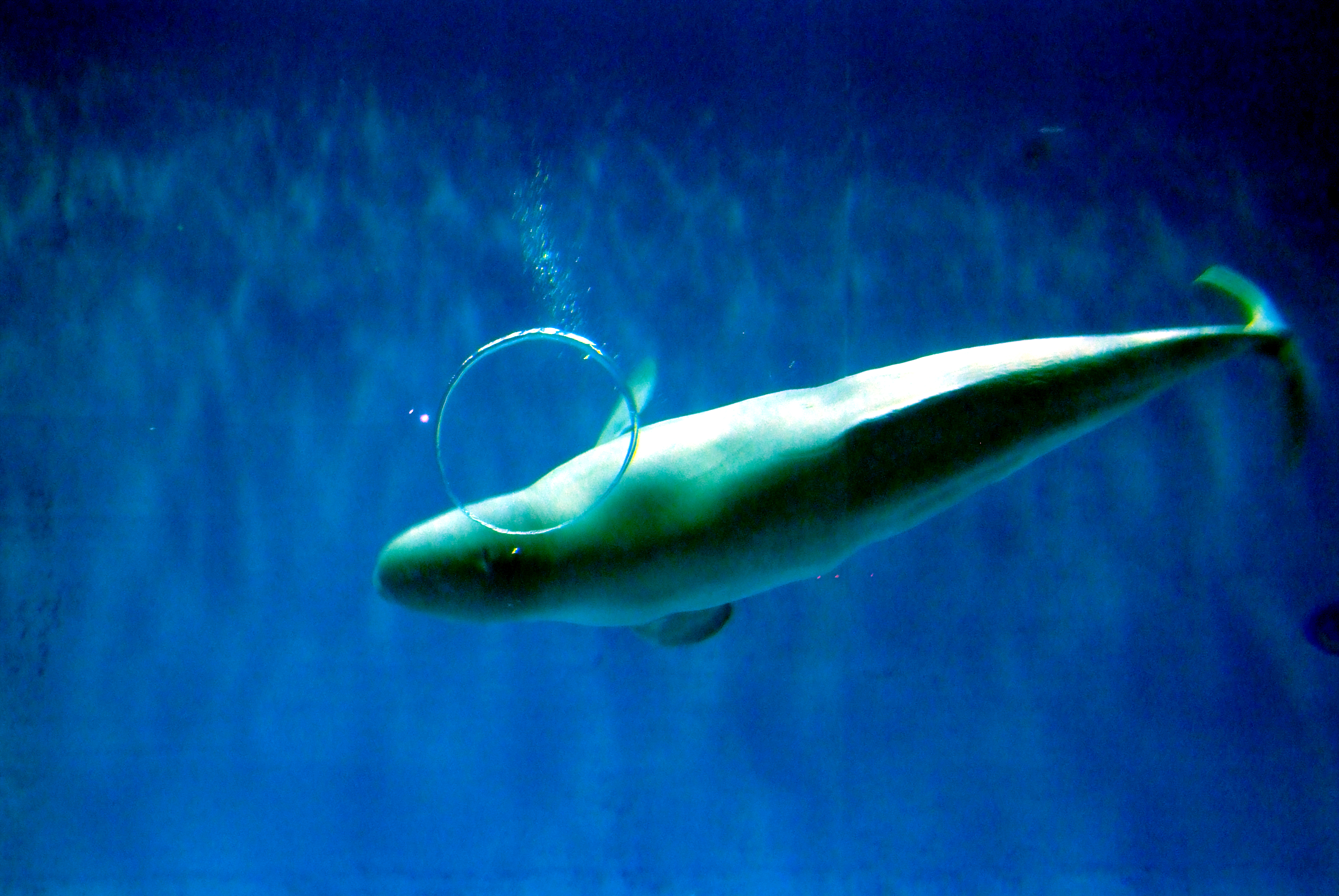

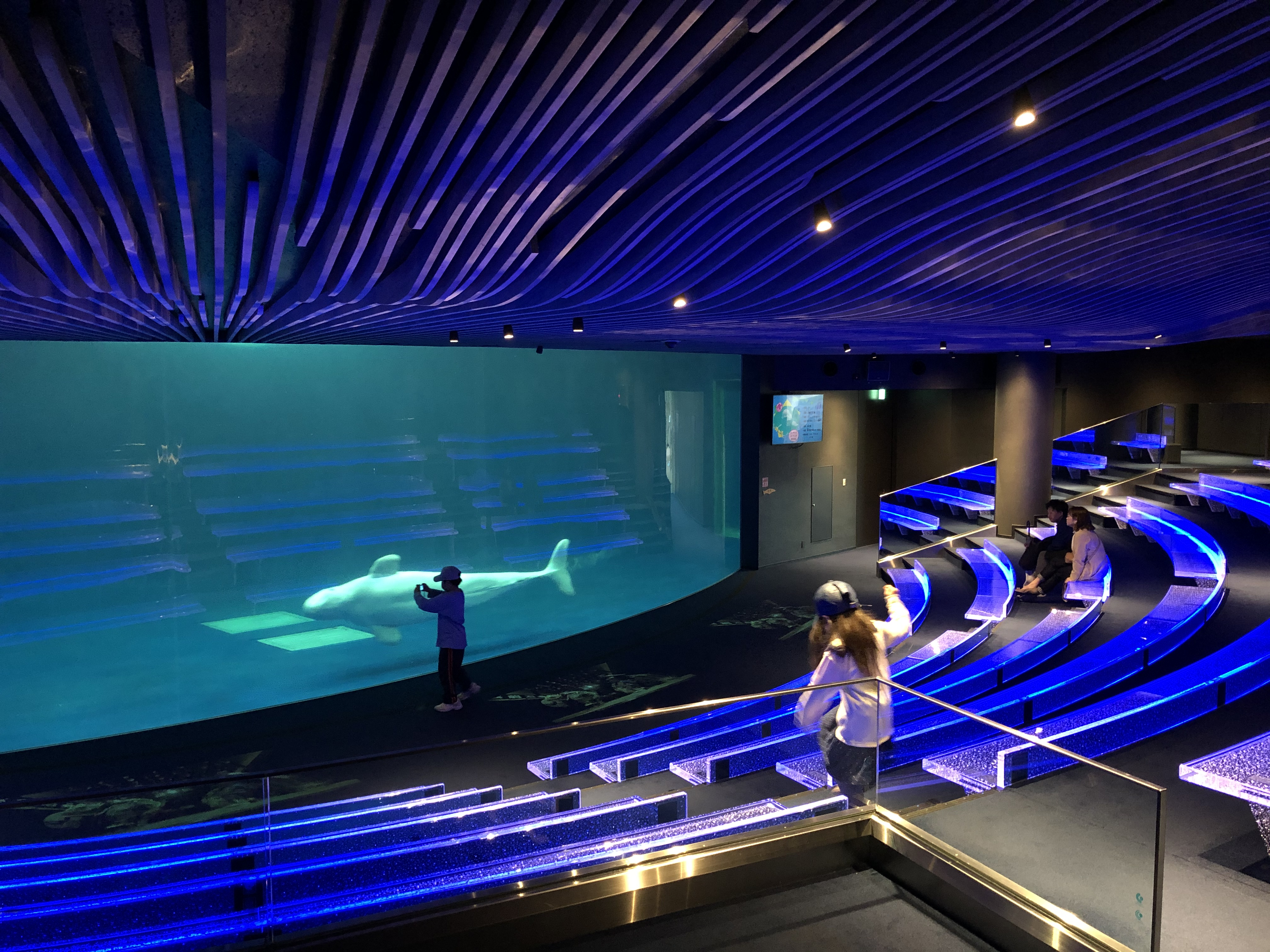
