= Moutere Mahue / Antipodes Island Marine Reserve =

Marine reserve in New Zealand territorial waters

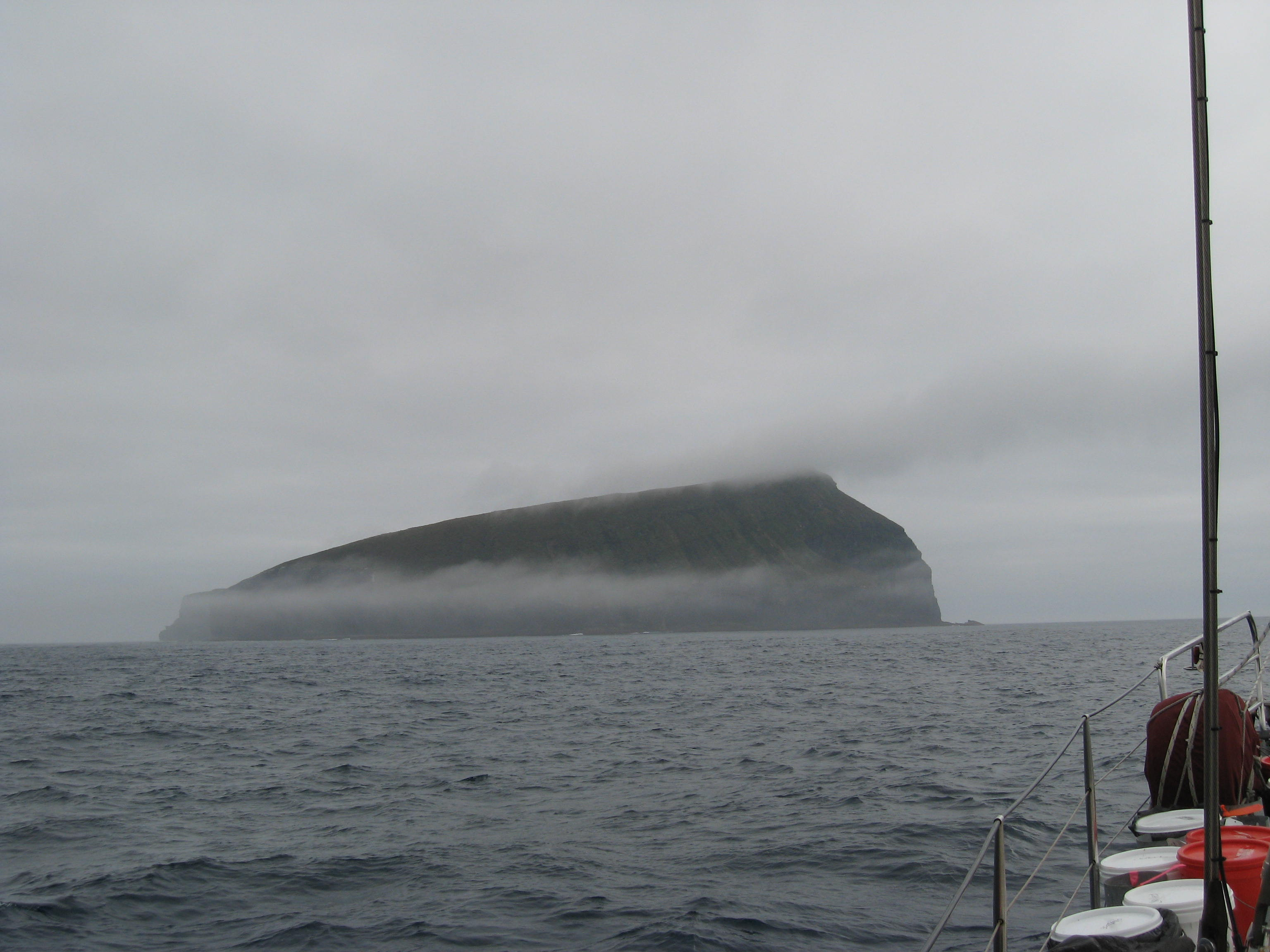
- Bolllons Island in the marine reserve

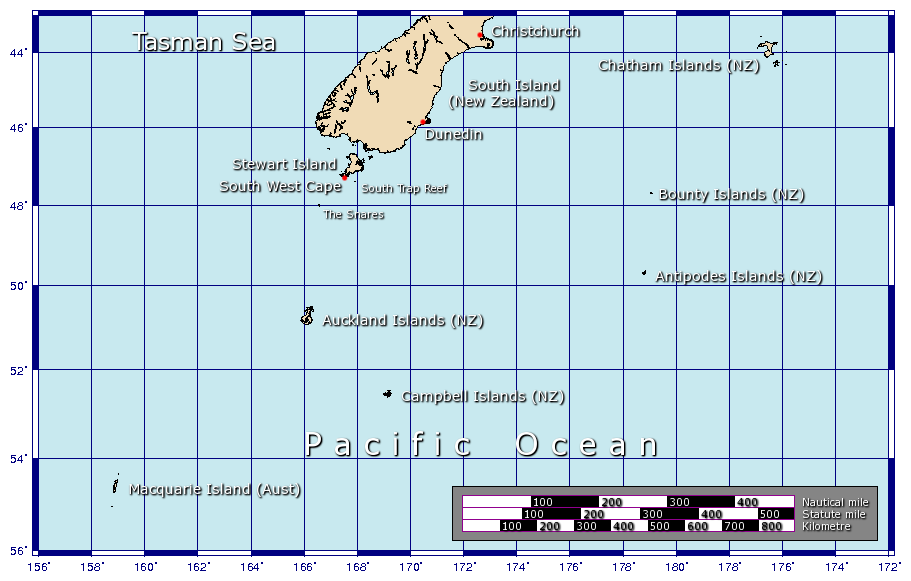
- Position relative to New Zealand and other outlying islands
- Location: New Zealand
- Coordinates: 49°40′S 178°46′E
- Area: 217,287 hectares (536,930 acres)
- Established: 2014
- Governing body: New Zealand Department of Conservation

Moutere Mahue / Antipodes Island Marine Reserve is a marine reserve covering an area of 217,287 hectares (536,930 acres) around the Antipodes Islands south of New Zealand's South Island and Stewart Island / Rakiura. It was established in 2014 and is administered by the New Zealand Department of Conservation.

The Māori name of the marine reserve and island group, Moutere Mahue, translates as “abandoned” or “deserted” island, referring to its isolation and remoteness. The English name, Antipodes Islands, refers to the main island being antipodal to London.

== Geography ==
The marine reserve extends in a circular boundary up to 12 nautical miles around the Antipodes Islands group, New Zealand’s most remote subantarctic islands, 750 kilometres (470 mi) southeast of the South Island.

The island group is made up of volcanic cones and vents, with sheer cliffs rising to a tussock-strewn plateau. Below water, the cliff supports large numbers of sessile (stationary) marine invertebrates and a diverse range of seaweeds.

To the south of the island group the ocean reaches a depth of 3,000 kilometres (1,900 mi), one of the deepest areas of New Zealand's marine reserves.

== History ==
The marine reserve was established on 2 March 2014.

Moutere Ihupuku / Campbell Island Marine Reserve and Moutere Hauriri / Bounty Islands Marine Reserve were established at the same time under the same law.

== Flora and fauna ==
The island group may have the highest underwater species diversity of any of New Zealand's subantarctic islands due to its clear water and proximity to the edge of an undersea plateau. Many of these species are found nowhere else in the world.

The animals provide a crucial food source for onshore species, including the Antipodean albatross, large colonies of erect-crested and eastern rockhopper penguins, southern elephant seals and New Zealand fur seals.

The extensive underwater rock walls are covered in bright pink layers of rare coralline algae seaweeds, and many invertebrates like sea sponges, sea anemones and bryozoans cling densely to the walls. Hundreds of seaweed species have been identified including some that are yet to be discovered. Endemic bull kelp beds down to over 20 metres deep, reaching up to four metres long.

There are some near-shore fish including the Antarctic cod (small-scaled notothenid). Species like ling and the Patagonian toothfish have been recorded further from the shore.

== Recreation ==
The marine reserve can only be accessed by boat and visitors require a permit. Guided tours are available.

== See also ==
- Marine reserves of New Zealand
