= Moutere Hauriri / Bounty Islands Marine Reserve =

Marine reserve in New Zealand

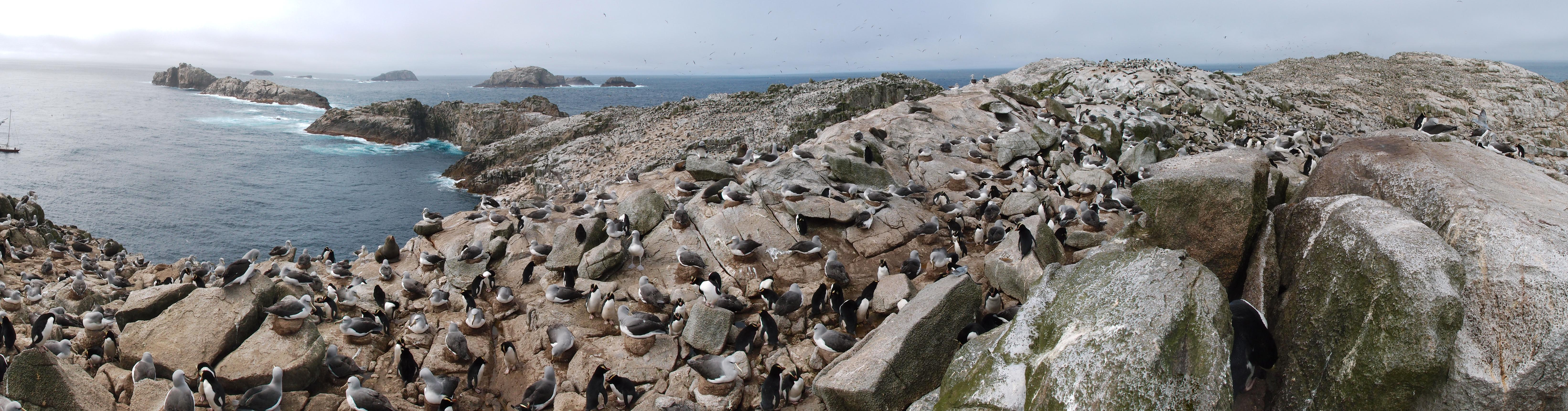
- Proclamation Island coastline

- Location within New Zealand Outlying Islands
- Location: New Zealand
- Coordinates: 47.8023°S 179.0595°E
- Area: 104,626 hectares (258,540 acres)
- Established: 2014
- Governing body: Department of Conservation

Moutere Hauriri / Bounty Islands Marine Reserve is a marine reserve covering an area of 104,626 hectares (258,540 acres) around New Zealand's Bounty Islands. It was established in 2014 and is administered by the Department of Conservation.

The island group of 20 igneous islets and rocks are scattered 700 kilometres (430 mi) east-southeast of the South Island.

Permits are required to land on the islands. This is only given to visits with a high justification, and must strictly adhere to a minimum impact code. There is no safe anchorage or landing place, boats can only safely navigate through the islands about one day in four, and strict quarantine measures are in place.

While fishing and landing are not permitted, people can travel through the marine reserve on cruises.

The rest of the territorial sea is a type 2 marine protected area, with a ban on bottom trawling, Danish seining and dredging.

== Geography ==
The Moutere Hauriri / Bounty Islands Marine Reserve includes an area south, north and north-west of the island ground.

The islands are made of bare granite from the Early Jurassic granitoids, with no natural vegetation or soil. The water around the islands is extremely clear, with visibility reaching up to 40 metres.

== History ==
The Māori name for the islands and marine reserve, Moutere Hauriri, roughly translates to "island of angry wind", referring to the rough sea conditions often found in the remote island group.

The English name for the islands, Bounty, is named after the ship William Bligh was sailing during the first European discovery of the islands in 1788.

The marine reserve was proposed in 2012. A law change to create the reserve was introduced to Parliament in 2011, and received legal recognition on 4 March 2014.

Moutere Mahue / Antipodes Island Marine Reserve and Moutere Ihupuku / Campbell Island Marine Reserve were created on the same day, under the same law change.

== Flora and fauna ==
The Bounty Islands are densely populated with the world's largest colony of over 20,000 New Zealand fur seals, about 30,000 breeding pairs each of Salvin’s mollymawks, erect-crested penguins, and fulmar prions, and about 500-600 pairs of Bounty Island shag. The islands can be smelt and heard from a long distance away during the crowded summer breeding season.

The layer of guano left from the breeding season provides food and shelter for beetles, wētā and some flightless moths above the water, and sea sponges and shellfish below the water.

The surrounding area is also teeming with underwater life. The diversity of species is similar to areas in the tropical and north Pacific, like the Galápagos Islands and Puget Sound. Brightly-coloured sponges, large mussels and barnacles live around the islands. Giant spider crabs and giant making crabs, with leg spans up to a meter long, also live in the rocky reefs near the shore.

== See also ==
- Marine reserves of New Zealand
