= Rockhopper =

Rockhopper may refer to:

- Rockhopper penguin, one of three closely related crested penguins
- Northern rockhopper penguin
- Rockhopper, a fictional pirate penguin from the online game Club Penguin
- rockhopper, an employment law service from law firm Lewis Silkin LLP
- Rockhopper Airlines, an airline now called Blue Islands based in Alderney, Guernsey, UK
- Rockhopper Exploration, oil exploration company
- Jersey Rockhoppers, a professional ice hockey team based in West Orange, New Jersey, USA
- Rockhopper, a type of mountain bike made by Specialized Bicycle Components
- Rockhopper, a spaceship in the novel Pushing Ice by Alastair Reynolds
