= French Southern and Antarctic Lands =

Overseas territory of France

French Southern and Antarctic Lands Terres australes et antarctiques françaises (French)
- Overseas territory
- Flag Coat of arms
- Motto: "Liberté, égalité, fraternité" (French) (English: "Liberty, equality, fraternity")
- Anthem: La Marseillaise ("The Marseillaise")
- Location of French Southern and Antarctic Lands (circled in red) in the Indian Ocean
- Sovereign state: France
- Territorial status: 6 August 1955
- Capital: Saint-Pierre, Réunion (headquarters, not geographically assigned); 43°00′S 67°00′E
- Largest settlement: Port-aux-Français
- Official languages: French
- Demonym(s): French

Government
  - President of the French Republic: Emmanuel Macron
  - Prefect, Administrator Superior: Florence Jeanblanc-Risler
  - Secretary General: Amélie Puccinelli
- Legislature: Advisory Council of the TAAF

Area
  - Total: 439,666.4 km^{2} (169,756.1 sq mi)

Population
  - Estimate: Officially 400~800 scientists and military personnel No known permanent population
- Currency: Euro (€) (EUR)
- Time zone: UTC+04:00; UTC+05:00; UTC+10:00
- Driving side: Right
- ISO 3166 code: TF; FR-TF
- Internet TLD: .tf
- Website: taaf.fr/en/

The French Southern and Antarctic Lands (French: Terres australes et antarctiques françaises, TAAF) is an overseas territory (French: Territoire d'outre-mer or TOM) of France.

It consists of:

- Adélie Land (Terre Adélie), the French claim on the continent of Antarctica.
- Crozet Islands (Îles Crozet), a group in the southern Indian Ocean, south of Madagascar.
- Kerguelen Islands (Archipel des Kerguelen), a group of volcanic islands in the southern Indian Ocean, southeast of Africa and southwest of Australia.
- Saint Paul and Amsterdam Islands (Îles Saint Paul et Amsterdam), a group to the north of the Kerguelen Islands.
- Scattered Islands (Îles Éparses), a dispersed group of islands around the coast of Madagascar.

The territory is sometimes referred to as the French Southern Lands (French: Terres australes françaises) or the French Southern Territories, usually to emphasize non-recognition of French sovereignty over Adélie Land as part of the Antarctic Treaty System.

The entire territory has no known permanently settled inhabitants. Approximately 150 (in the winter) to 310 (in the summer) people are usually present in the French Southern and Antarctic Lands at any time, but they are mainly made up of military personnel, officials, scientific researchers and support staff.

On 5 July 2019, the Crozet Islands, the Kerguelen Islands, and the Saint Paul and Amsterdam Islands, as the "French Austral Lands and Seas", were inscribed as a UNESCO World Heritage Site because of their pristine wilderness, biodiversity, and enormous bird colonies.

Although the region's capital is based in Réunion, this island is a member of the overseas departments and regions of France, and should not be confused with the overseas territories.

== History ==
The islands became known in the 16th century, when the Spanish discovered Amsterdam Island on 18 March 1522, which was later claimed and named by the Dutch. Saint Paul Island was discovered in 1559 by the Portuguese. The Crozet islands were discovered on 24 January 1772 by French explorer Marc-Joseph Marion du Fresne during an expedition. Adelie Land was the last to be discovered, in 1840 by the French during an expedition led by Jules Dumont d'Urville, who would later have a research station on the island named after him.

The entire territory has no known permanently settled inhabitants. It is mainly visited by military personnel, officials, scientific researchers, and support staff. In 2019, the Crozet Islands, Kerguelen Islands, and Saint Paul and Amsterdam Islands were inscribed as a UNESCO World Heritage Site due to their pristine wilderness, biodiversity, and enormous bird colonies.

On 6 August 1955, French law reorganized the administration of the islands into a new overseas territory administered by France itself, changing the previous arrangement in which the territory was attached to Madagascar (then a French colony).

The Scattered Islands in the Indian Ocean are partially claimed by the Comoros, Madagascar and Mauritius. The Malagasy and Mauritian claims, however, are significantly later than their access to independence. However, the agreement reached in October 2024 on the surrender to Mauritius of the Chagos Islands by Great Britain, in the heart of the Indian Ocean, notably home to the American base of Diego Garcia, has relaunched the debate in Madagascar.

== Administration ==
The French Southern and Antarctic Lands have formed a territoire d'outre-mer (an overseas territory) of France since 1955. Formerly, they were administered from Paris by an administrateur supérieur assisted by a secretary-general; since December 2004, however, their administrator has been a préfet, currently Florence Jeanblanc-Risler, with headquarters in Saint Pierre on Réunion Island.

The TAAF administration, the French Polar Institute Paul-Émile Victor (IPEV) and the French Navy jointly operate the icebreaker Astrolabe which is based out of Reunion. The vessel is used both to bring personnel and supplies to the Dumont d'Urville Station and for research and patrol duties. The French armed forces also maintain small troop contingents on some of the Scattered Islands in order to protect the French territorial claim.

The territory is divided into five districts:

District	Administrative centre	Population		Area	EEZ
District	Administrative centre	Winter	Summer	(km^{2})	
Adélie Land	Dumont d'Urville Station	30	110	432,000	—
Crozet Islands	Alfred Faure	25	45	352	567,475
Kerguelen Islands	Port-aux-Français	70	110	7,215	563,869
Saint Paul and Amsterdam Islands	Martin-de-Viviès	25	45	61	502,533
Scattered Islands^{a}	Saint Pierre^{b}, Réunion	56	56	38.4	640,400
TAAF	Saint Pierre^{c}, Réunion	206	366	439,666.4	2,274,277

^{a} According to new law 2007-224 of February 21, 2007, the Scattered Islands constitute the TAAF's fifth district. The TAAF website does not mention their population. The data are not included in the totals.
^{b} The Îles Éparses principal station is on Tromelin Island. The headquarters of the district chief lies beyond the TAAF, in Saint Pierre on Réunion Island.
^{c} The Territory's principal station is Martin-de-Viviès on Amsterdam Island. The capital and headquarters of the territorial administrator lies beyond the TAAF, in Saint Pierre on Réunion Island.

Each district is headed by a district chief, who has powers similar to those of a French mayor (including recording births and deaths and being an officer of judicial police).

Because there is no permanent population, there is no elected assembly, nor does the territory send representatives to the national parliament.

== Geography ==
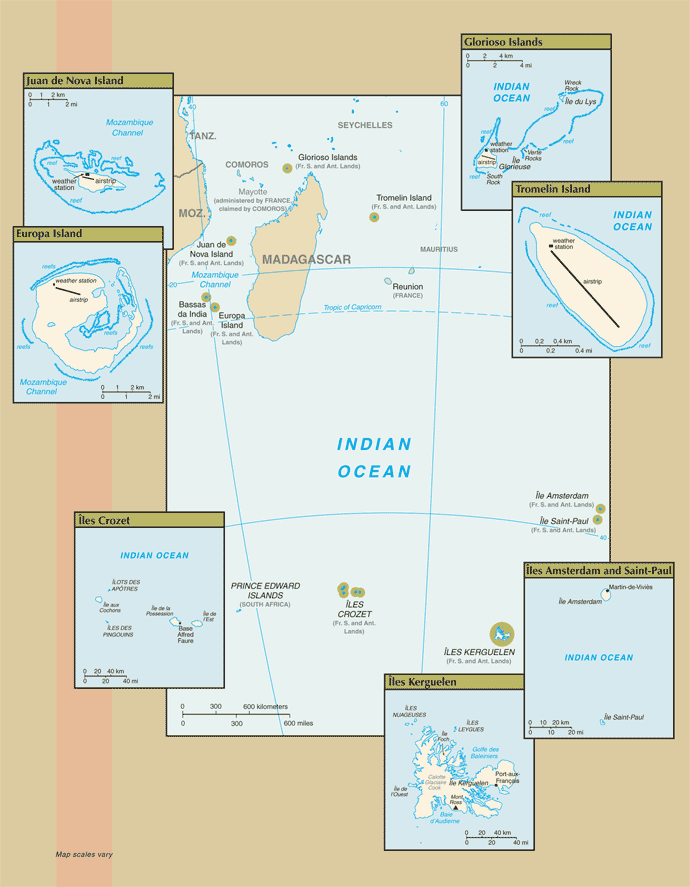
Map of the French Southern and Antarctic Lands. Adélie Land (in Antarctica) and Banc du Geyser and Bassas da India (in the Îles Éparses district) are not shown.

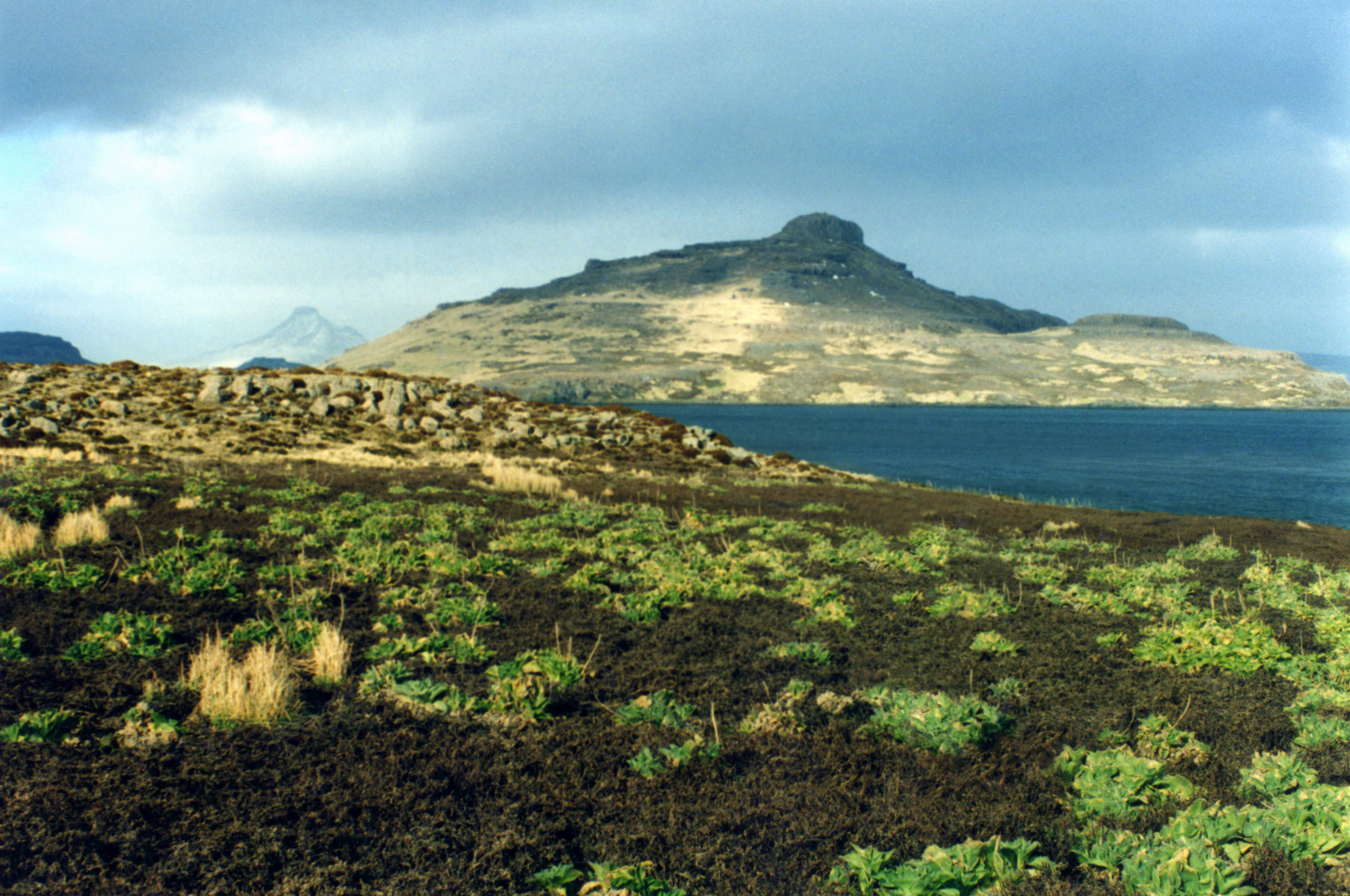
Kerguelen cabbages on Île Mayès, Kerguelen

The territory includes the Crozet Islands, the Kerguelen Islands, and the Saint Paul and Amsterdam Islands in the southern Indian Ocean near 43°S, 67°E, along with Adélie Land, the sector of Antarctica claimed by France. Adélie Land, named by the French explorer Jules Dumont d’Urville after his wife, covers about 432,000 km^{2} (167,000 sq mi). The islands, totaling 7,781 km^{2} (3,004 sq mi), have no indigenous inhabitants, although in 1997 there were approximately 100 researchers whose numbers varied from winter (July) to summer (January).

Amsterdam Island and Saint Paul Island are both extinct volcanoes and have been delineated as the Amsterdam and Saint-Paul Islands temperate grasslands ecoregion. The highest point in the territory is Mont Ross on Kerguelen Island, standing at 1,850 m (6,070 ft). Notably, there are very few airstrips on the islands, existing only on islands with weather stations. The 1,232 km (766 mi) of coastline lacks ports or harbors, offering only offshore anchorages.

The islands in the Indian Ocean receive supplies via the special ship Marion Dufresne, which sails out of Le Port in Réunion Island. Terre Adélie, the Antarctic sector claimed by France, is supplied by L’Astrolabe, which sails out of Hobart in Tasmania.

Regarding maritime activity, the territory maintains a merchant marine fleet totaling (as of 1999) 2,892,911 GRT/5,165,713 tonnes deadweight (DWT). This fleet includes seven bulk carriers, five cargo ships, ten chemical tankers, nine container ships, six liquefied gas carriers, 24 petroleum tankers, one refrigerated cargo ship, and ten roll-on/roll-off (RORO) carriers. Notably, this fleet operates under the French register, allowing French-owned ships to benefit from more liberal taxation and manning regulations than those permissible under the main French register. However, this register is expected to be replaced by the International French Register (Registre International Français, RIF) in the future.

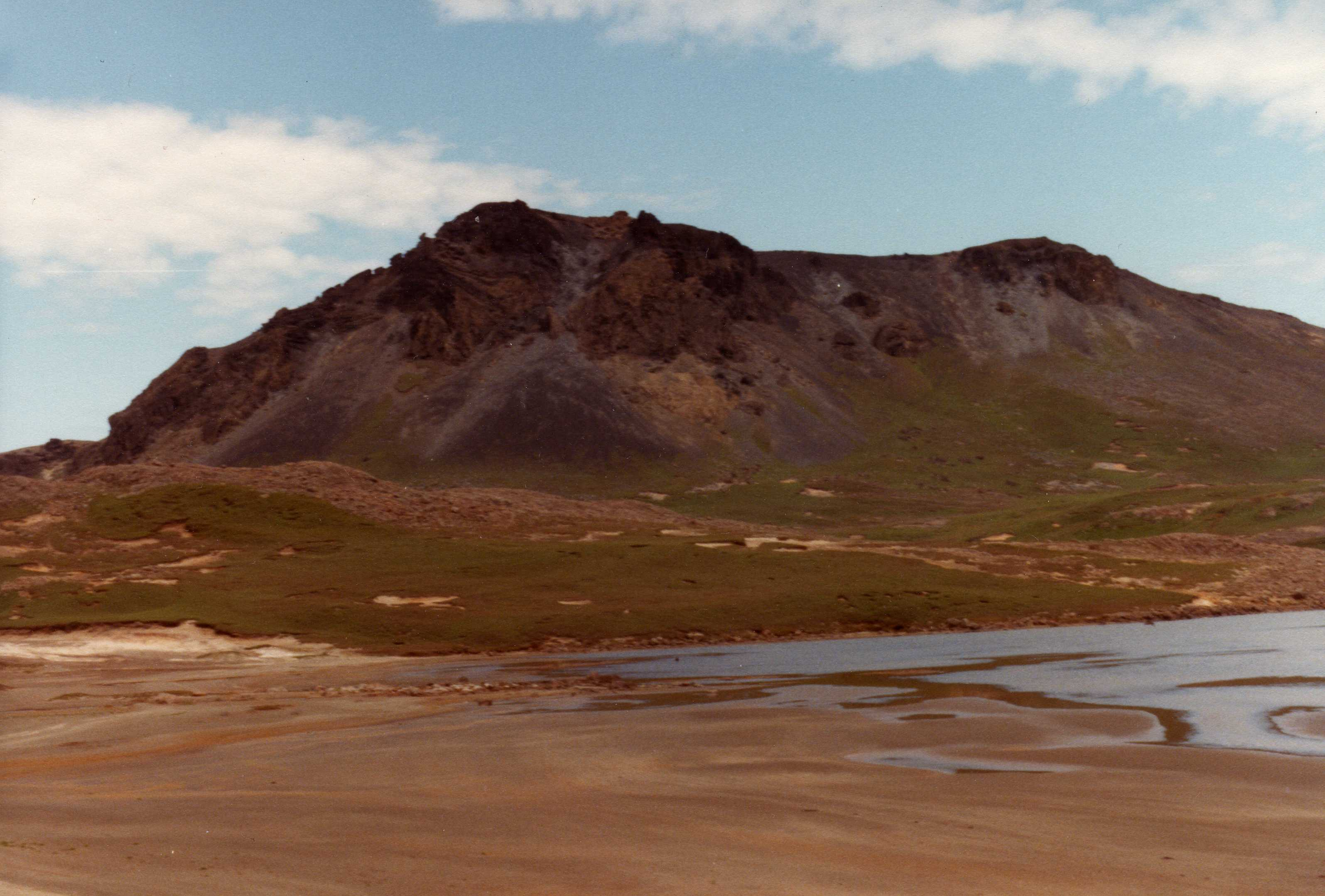
Volcan du Diable on Grande Terre, Kerguelen

== Sovereignty claims ==
Mauritius, Madagascar, and the Comoros dispute France's sovereignty over the Scattered Islands in the Indian Ocean. Mauritius claims Tromelin Island and states that the island, discovered by France in 1722, was not ceded by the Treaty of Paris in 1814. Madagascar claims sovereignty over the Glorioso Islands (including Banc du Geyser), though the island group was never a part of the Malagasy Protectorate, having been a part of the Colony of Mayotte and dependencies, then a part of the French Comoros that had become a separately administered colony from Madagascar in 1946. Madagascar has also claimed Bassas da India, Europa Island, and Juan de Nova Island since 1972, and a 1979 United Nations resolution (without binding force) demanded the cession of these islands to Madagascar. The Comoros also claims the Glorioso Islands (including Banc du Geyser), as a part of the disputed French region of Mayotte.

The French claim over Adélie Land, being a part of Antarctica, is not internationally recognized.

== Flora and fauna ==
Designations

UNESCO World Heritage Site
- Official name: French Austral Lands and Seas
- Criteria: Natural: (vii), (ix), (x)
- Designated: 2019 (43rd session)
- Reference no.: 1603
- Region: Western Europe
- Area: 67,296,900 ha

Ramsar Wetland
- Official name: Réserve Naturelle Nationale des Terres Australes Francaises
- Designated: 15 September 2008
- Reference no.: 1837

Due to their isolation, the French islands in the southern Indian Ocean comprise one of the last remaining large wilderness areas on Earth. Furthermore, the islands are positioned along the Antarctic Convergence, where upwelling creates nutrient-rich waters. As a result, birds and marine mammals gather on the islands in great abundance. More than 50 million birds of 47 species breed on the islands, including more than half the breeding population of 16 different species. The largest populations of king penguins and the endangered Indian yellow-nosed albatross on Earth are found on the Crozet Islands and Amsterdam Island, respectively. Other threatened bird species with important populations on the islands include Eaton's pintail, MacGillivray's prion, and the Amsterdam albatross, which is one of four bird species endemic to the island group. The French Southern Lands also hold the second largest population of southern elephant seals on Earth, numbering roughly 200,000, and the third largest population of the Antarctic fur seal.

Because of their isolation and subpolar location, the French Southern Lands are relatively depauperate of vegetation, with both Saint-Paul and Crozet having no native tree or shrub species. However, eight of the 36 higher plant species are endemic. Some species of endemic invertebrates have also been recorded on the islands, including moths and flies which have lost their wings in the absence of predators.

== Economy ==
Exports of the French Southern and Antarctic Lands by product category (2019) Chemical products Transportation Machines Mineral products Plastics and rubbers Metals Foodstuffs Precious metals Textiles Instruments Animal products Vegetable products Paper goods Footwear and headwear Miscellaneous Stone and glass Wood products Animal and vegetable bi-products Animal hides Arts and antiques Weapons

The territory's natural resources are limited to fish and crustaceans. Economic activity is limited to servicing meteorological and geophysical research stations and French and other fishing fleets.

The main fish resources are Patagonian toothfish and spiny lobster. Both are poached by foreign fleets; because of this, the French Navy, and occasionally other services, patrol the zone and arrest poaching vessels. Such arrests can result in heavy fines or the seizure of the ship.

France previously sold licenses to foreign fisheries to fish the Patagonian toothfish; because of overfishing, it is now restricted to a small number of fisheries from Réunion Island.

The territory takes in revenues of about €16 million a year.

== Locations and scientific stations ==
While the territory lacks a permanent civilian population, there are several inhabited research stations. Île Amsterdam has a meteorological station. Îles Crozet contains the Alfred Faure research station with a population of about 20-30 people. One of the most populous research stations in the Îles Kerguelen, Port-aux-Francais, contains 50-100 researchers. The Îles Éparses contains a French military garrison and is a spot for meteorology. The Dumont d’Urville station is a vital area for studying wildlife, the atmosphere and the ice caps.

=== Adélie Land ===
Name	Location	Status
Charcot Station		Uninhabited
Dumont d'Urville Station	Petrel Island (Antarctica)	Inhabited
Port Martin	Cape Margerie	Uninhabited
Robert Guillard Station		Inhabited

=== Crozet Islands ===
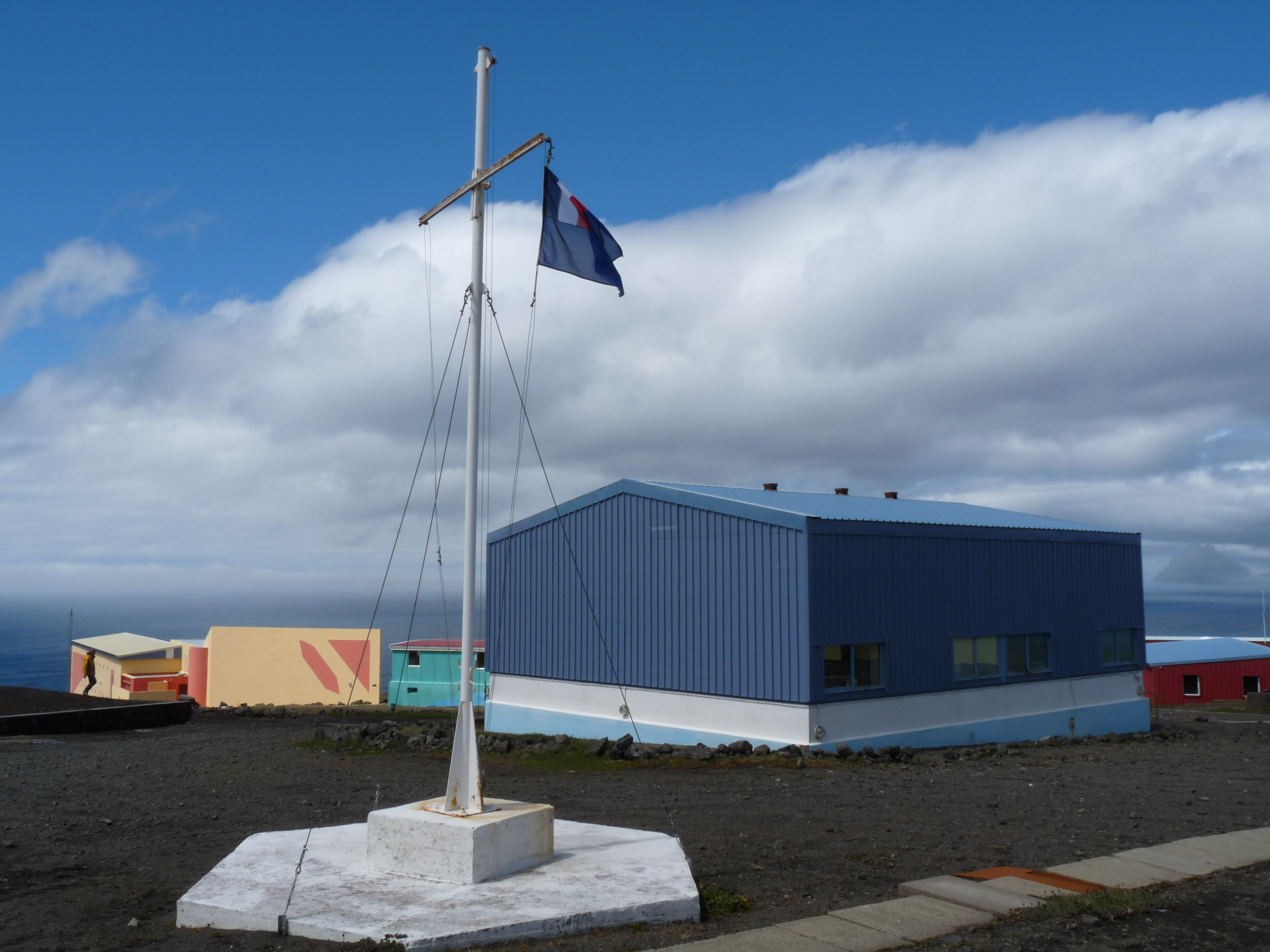
View of Alfred Faure

Name	Location	Status
Alfred Faure	Île de la Possession	Inhabited

=== Kerguelen Islands ===
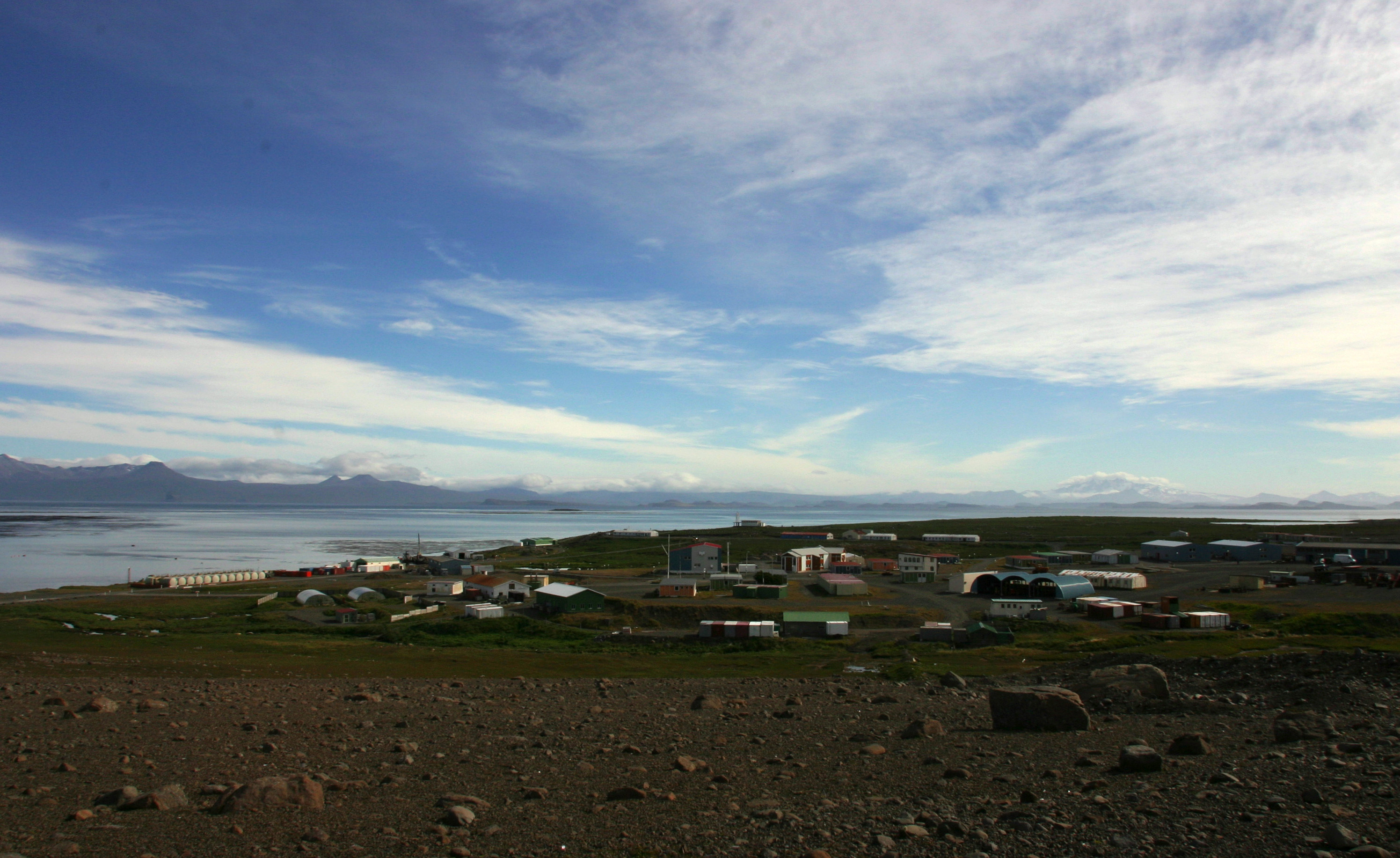
View of Port-aux-Français

Name	Location	Status
Port-aux-Français	Gulf of Morbihan	Inhabited
Port-Christmas	Loranchet Peninsula	Uninhabited

=== Saint Paul and Amsterdam Islands ===
Name	Location	Status
Martin-de-Viviès	Amsterdam Island	Inhabited

=== Scattered Islands ===
There are no permanent settlements on the islands, however the French Armed Forces maintain small troop contingents on some of the islands. There are also weather stations on all the islands apart from Bassas da India.

== Codes ==
The French Southern Territories (i.e. the TAAF excluding Adélie Land) have been given the following country codes: FS (FIPS) and TF (ISO 3166-1 alpha-2).

== See also ==
- Administrative divisions of France
- French colonial empire
- French Fifth Republic
- List of French islands in the Indian and Pacific oceans
- List of French possessions and colonies
- Outline of France
- Overseas France
