= Florence Jeanblanc-Risler =

French administrator and diplomat

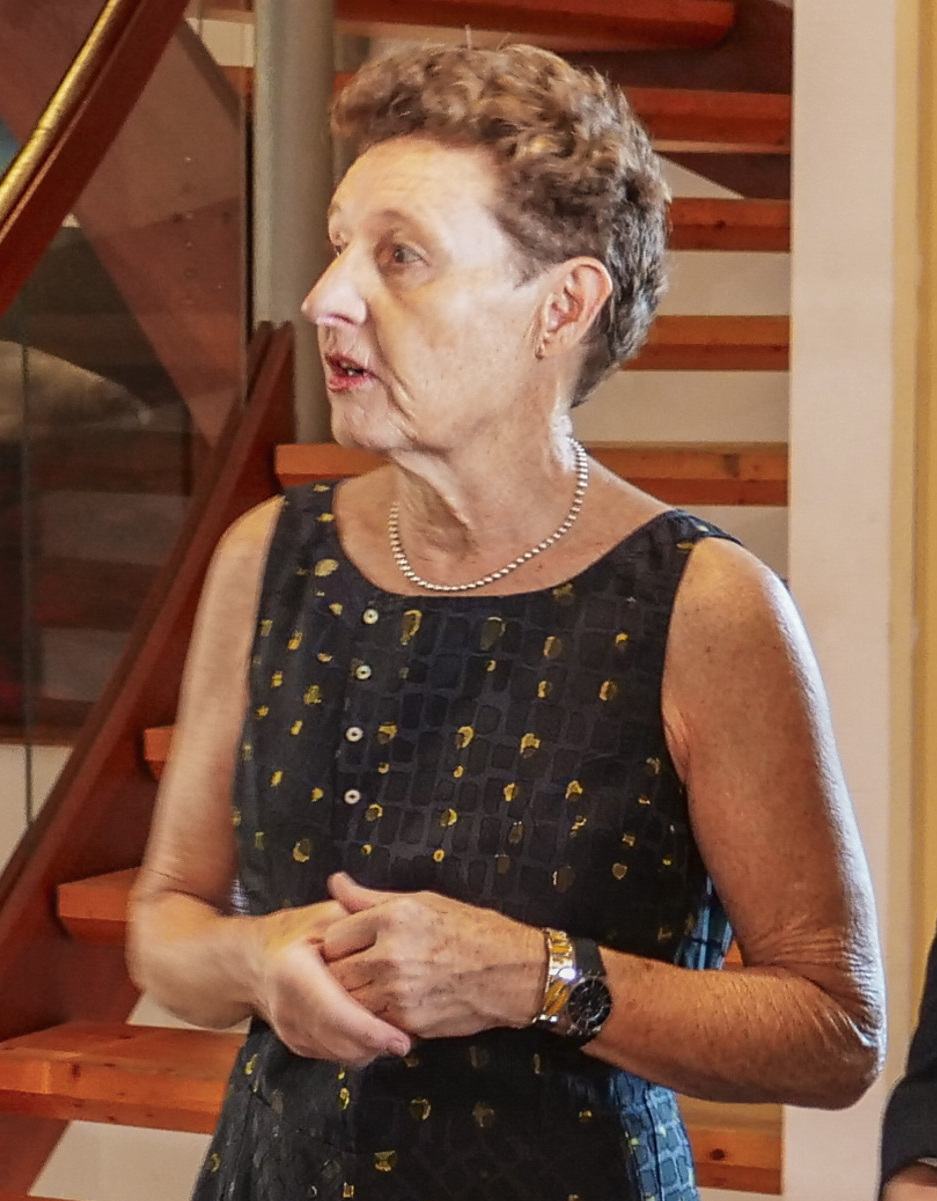

Prefect of the French Southern and Antarctic Lands
- Incumbent
- Assumed office 27 October 2022
- Preceded by: Charles Giusti

Personal details
- Born: 30 November 1957 (age 68) Belfort, France
- Children: 3
- Education: Sciences Po; University of South Carolina; École Nationale d'Administration (ENA)

Florence Jeanblanc-Risler (born 30 November 1957) is a French administrator and diplomat who has been the prefect of the French Southern and Antarctic Lands since 2022. She was the French ambassador to New Zealand from 2015 to 2018, Laos from 2018 to 2021, and held other diplomatic posts. Prior to her diplomatic career she worked in civil aviation and at the Trésor public.

== Early life and education ==
Florence Jeanblanc-Risler was born in Belfort, France, on 30 November 1957. She graduated from Sciences Po in the 1980s. She graduated from the University of South Carolina with a master's degree in international relations.

== Career ==
Jeanblanc-Risler worked in civil aviation for seven years and then at the Trésor public for twenty-five years. She was the head of the General Directorate of Civil Aviation from 1984 to 1987. From 1989 to 1992, she was an institutional and financial audit officer for the Secretary General of the International Civil Aviation Organization in Montreal.

At the French Embassy in the United States Jeanblanc-Risler was an economic and commercial advisor from 1999 to 2001. She was Minister Counselor for Economic Affairs at the French embassy in Canada from 2006 to 2009. She was the French ambassador to New Zealand from 2015 to 2018, and to Laos from 2018 to 2021.

On 5 October 2022, Jeanblanc-Risler was appointed to succeed Charles Giusti as prefect of the French Southern and Antarctic Lands. She assumed her duties on 27 October.

== Personal life ==
Jeanblanc-Risler is the mother of three children. The Legion of Honour was awarded to her.

== Works cited ==
=== News ===
- "Florence Jeanblanc-Risler nouvelle préfète des Taaf". Le Marin. 6 October 2022. Archived from the original on 3 July 2025.
- Hutching, Gerard (24 February 2016). "Ambassador balances trade-offs of EU agreement". Stuff. Archived from the original on 3 July 2025.
- Zimmer, François (31 May 2015). "Ambassadrice en Nouvelle-Zélande". L'Est Républicain. Archived from the original on 3 July 2025.

=== Web ===
- "Florence Jeanblanc-Risler has taken up her duties as prefect, senior administrator of the TAAF". French Southern and Antarctic Lands. Archived from the original on 20 March 2025.
- "Liste Des Ambassadeurs en Poste" (PDF). Ministry for Europe and Foreign Affairs. Archived (PDF) from the original on 3 July 2025.
