= Volcan du Diable =

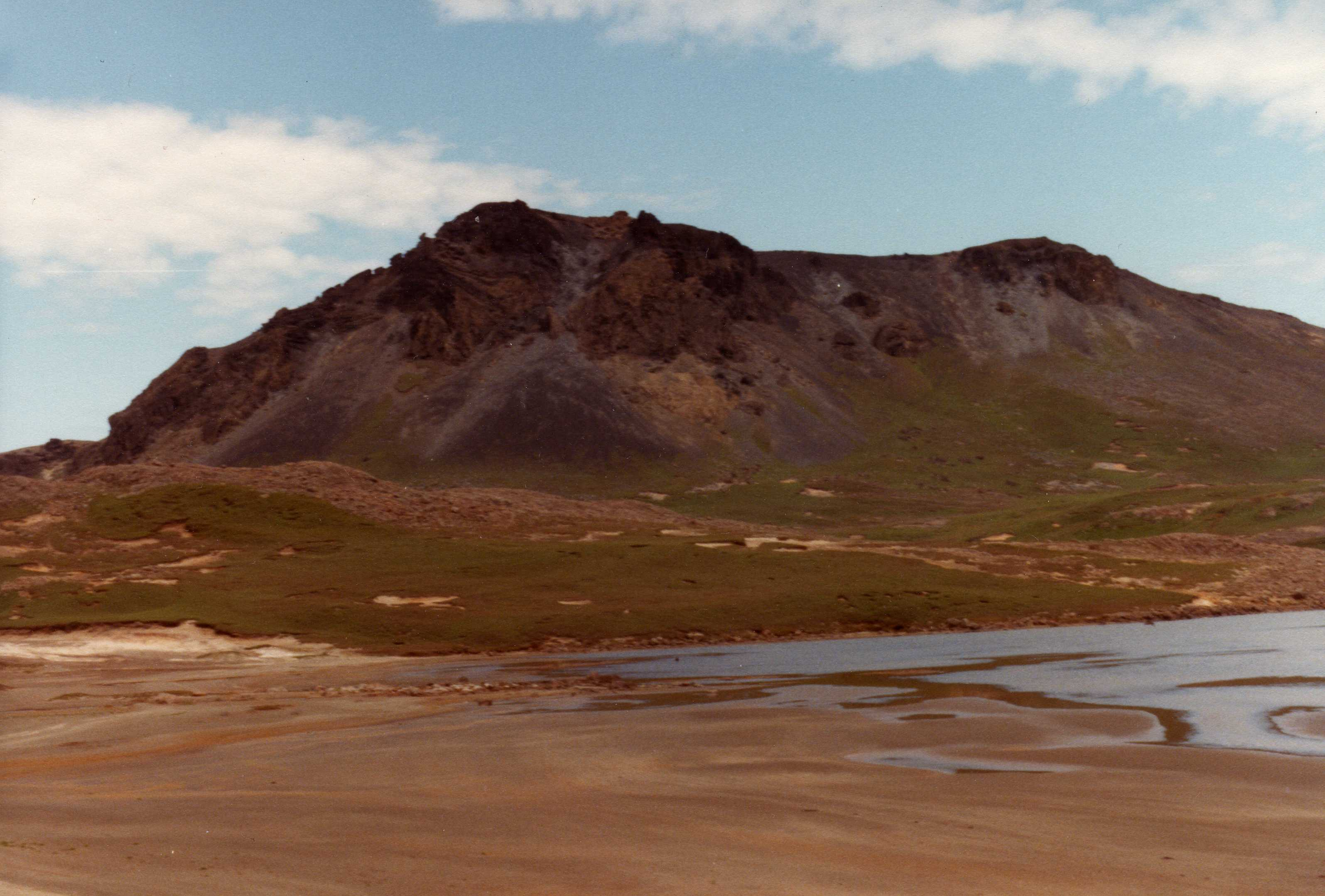
- The northern slopes of the "volcan du Diable", seen from one of the beaches of the lake of Argoat.

Highest point
- Elevation: 315 m (1,033 ft)
- Prominence: 315 m (1,033 ft)
- Coordinates: 49°29′37″S 69°43′28″E

Geography
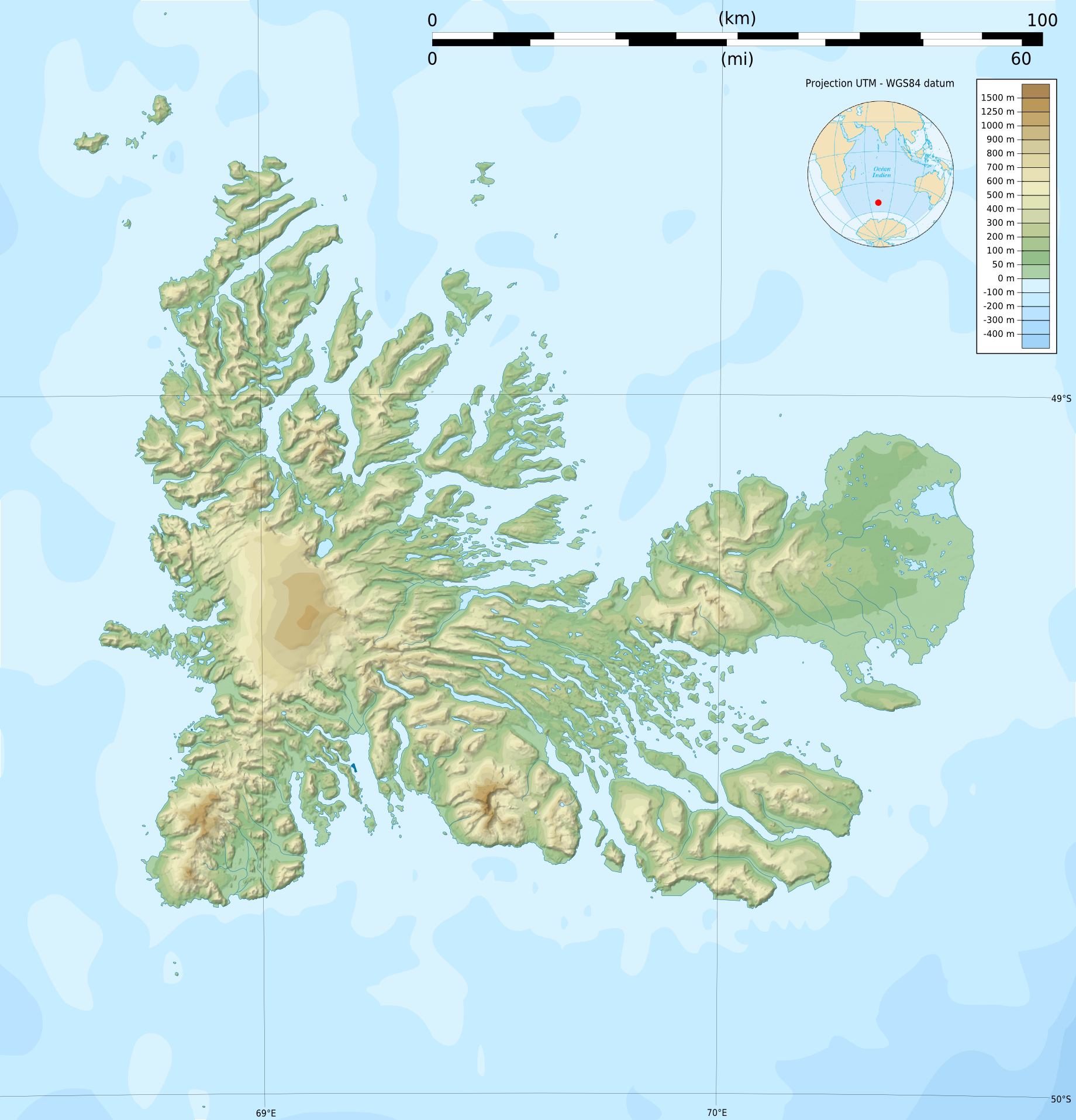
- Location within Kerguelen
- Location: Kerguelen Islands, southern Indian Ocean France
- Parent range: Plateau Central

Geology
- Mountain type: Strombolian volcano
- Last eruption: Unknown

The Volcan du Diable (French pronunciation: [vɔlkɑ̃ dy djabl], lit. 'Devil's Volcano') is a small mountain of the Kerguelen Islands, located in the central region of the main island of Grande Terre. It reaches the height of 315 metres.
