= Saint Paul and Amsterdam Islands =

Pair of islands in the French Southern and Antarctic Lands

Saint Paul and Amsterdam Islands Îles Saint-Paul et Amsterdam (French)
- District of French Southern and Antarctic Lands
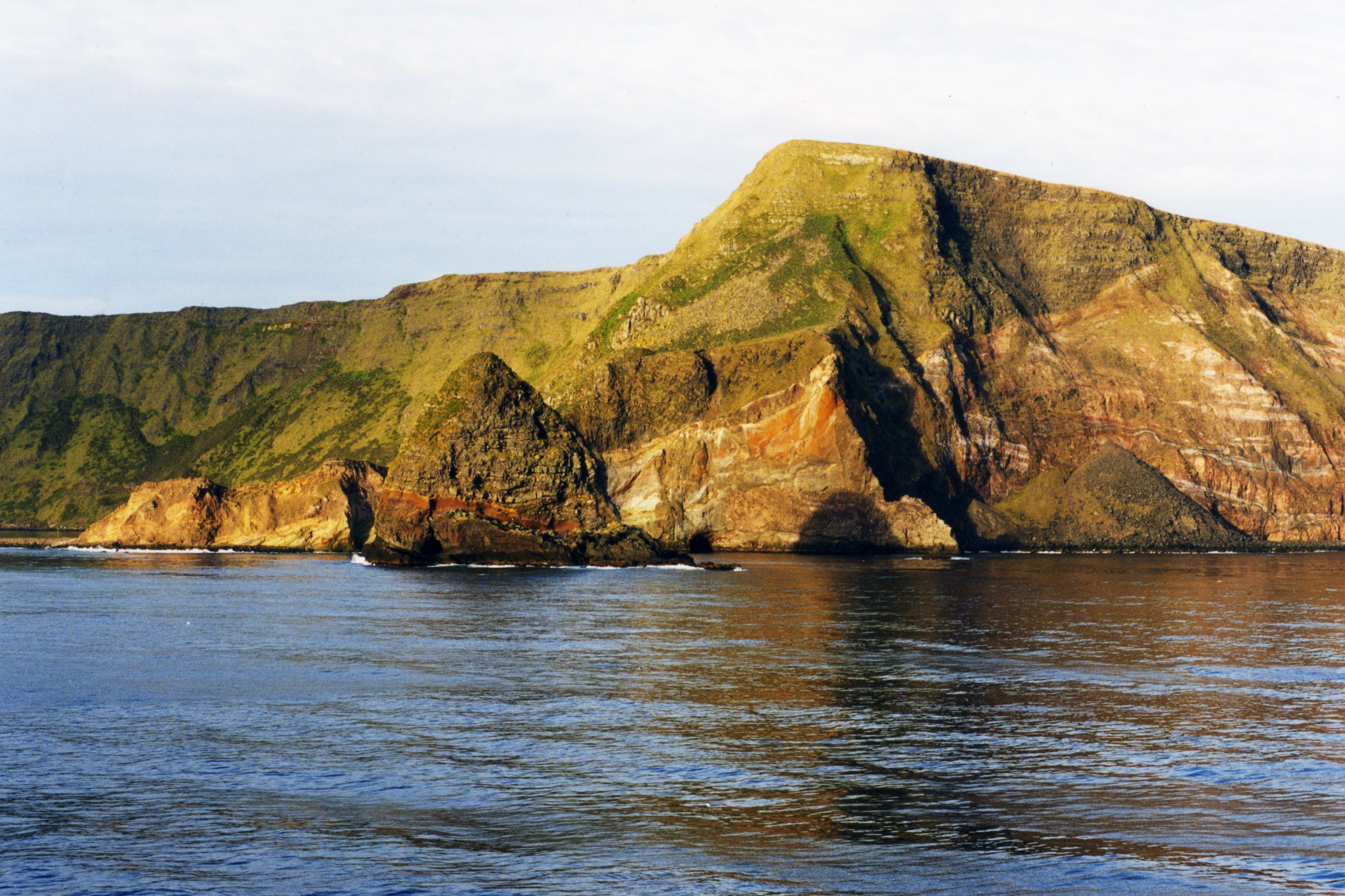
- Interactive map of Saint Paul and Amsterdam Islands
- Location within Indian Ocean
- Coordinates: 37°50′19″S 77°33′49″E
- Country: France
- Overseas territory: French Southern and Antarctic Lands
- Islands: 2 islands: Île Saint-Paul; Île Amsterdam

Area
  - Total: 66 km^{2} (25 sq mi)

Population
  - Estimate: c. 25 (winter); < 50 (summer)
- Time zone: UTC+5

Saint Paul and Amsterdam Islands is a district of the French Southern and Antarctic Lands, covering the islands of Saint-Paul and Amsterdam (formerly New Amsterdam). This district is located in the southern Indian Ocean at the southwestern end of the Australian plate, approximately 1,325 km north-northeast of the Kerguelen Islands. The population is about twenty-five people in winter and fifty people in summer.

A permanent scientific station, Martin-de-Viviès, is located on Île Amsterdam and is owned and managed by French Southern and Antarctic Lands with support from the French Polar Institute. In 2006, the island was listed as natural reserve.
