= Rockhopper penguin =

Common name for a type of bird

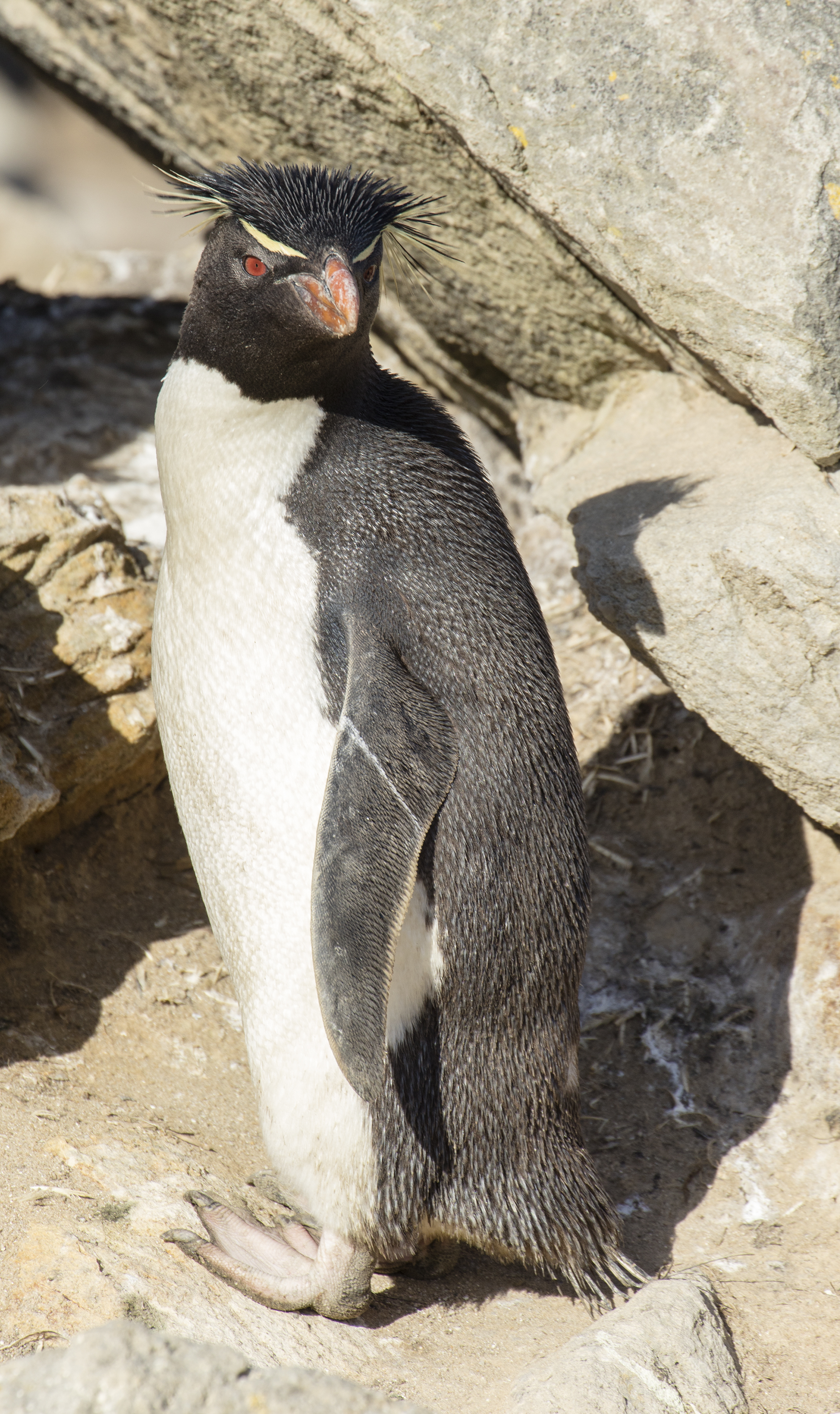
Southern rockhopper penguin, Eudyptes (chrysocome) chrysocome, New Island, Falkland Islands

The rockhopper penguins are three closely related taxa of crested penguins that have been traditionally treated as a single species and are sometimes split into three species.

Not all zoologists agree on the classification of these penguins. Some consider all three to be distinct species, while others separate the western and eastern forms as the southern rockhopper penguin and regard the northern rockhopper as a separate species. Still, some zoologists view all three as varieties of a single species.

== Appearance ==
Rockhopper penguins (Eudyptes chrysocome) are among the smaller species of penguin. After reaching full growth, they are about 20 inches or 50 centimetres in height. Males and females cannot be distinguished visually, so a DNA test is conducted by taking a feather from the bird to determine its gender. Like many penguins, rockhopper penguins have a white belly and the rest of their body is black. Some distinguishing characteristics of these penguins include their red eyes, orange beak, pink webbed feet, and the yellow and black spiky feathers on their heads. Although their yellow and black spiky feathers differentiate them from other penguins, rockhopper penguin chicks do not have them; these feathers develop with age. Their orange beak is initially black, but as the penguins get older, their beaks turn orange. Due to the harsh rocky environment, they cannot slide on their bellies like most penguins, so they hop to get from one place to another, hence their name.

The yellow and black ‘hair’ they have on the top of their head is similar to that of the Macaroni penguin (Eudyptes chrysolophus).

== Species ==
What separates rockhopper penguins into species is their breeding location and reproductive behaviors. The differences in mating signals between the two southern species and the northern species (E. moseleyi) appear to have evolved rapidly, making these behavioral changes sufficient to isolate the two taxa.

Southern rockhopper penguins are now split into two species and they are defined by their location of reproduction. The species E. filholi (eastern) is known to reproduce in the sub-Antarctic around the Prince Edward Islands, Crozet Islands, Kerguelen Islands, Heard Island, Macquarie Island and Campbell, Auckland and Antipodes Islands. The species E. chrysocome reproduces at offshore islands in southern Chile, Argentina and at the Falkland Islands. The Falkland Islands are known to have one of the largest populations of western rockhopper penguins.

The species in the group are:

- Western rockhopper penguin, Eudyptes (chrysocome) chrysocome
- Eastern rockhopper penguin, Eudyptes (chrysocome) filholi
- Northern rockhopper penguin, Eudyptes (chrysocome) moseleyi

== Habitat and distribution ==
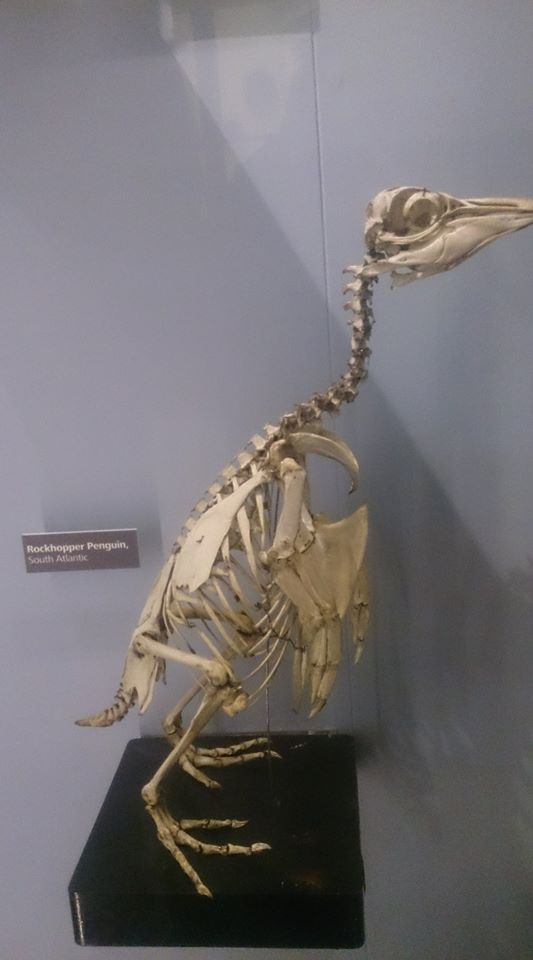
Rockhopper penguin skeleton in Manchester Museum

Northern rockhopper penguins breed in cool temperate climates including on the islands of Gough and Tristan da Cunha in the Atlantic Ocean and Saint Paul and Amsterdam Islands in the Indian Ocean. The southern rockhopper breeds on the Falkland Islands, Argentina and Chile, with breeding colonies around Cape Horn in South America, and Gough, Prince Edward, Marion, Crozet, Kerguelen, Heard, Macquarie, Campbell, Auckland and Antipodes Islands in the southern Indian Ocean. Eastern rockhopper penguins are mostly found breeding on Campbell Island in New Zealand, but their numbers have declined immensely. Rockhopper penguins usually make their habitat in rocky shorelines. They make nests and burrows in tall grasses called tussocks.

== Diet ==
The rockhopper penguin's diet consists of krill and small crustaceans, which may include shrimp, crabs, lobsters or crayfish. They also eat squid and myctophid fish. Rockhopper penguins consume more krill than they do fish; their diet changes during migration and as the seasons change. Rockhopper penguins can be at sea for several days while hunting. They can dive up to 330 feet (100 m) for many minutes at a time while searching for prey.

== Reproduction ==
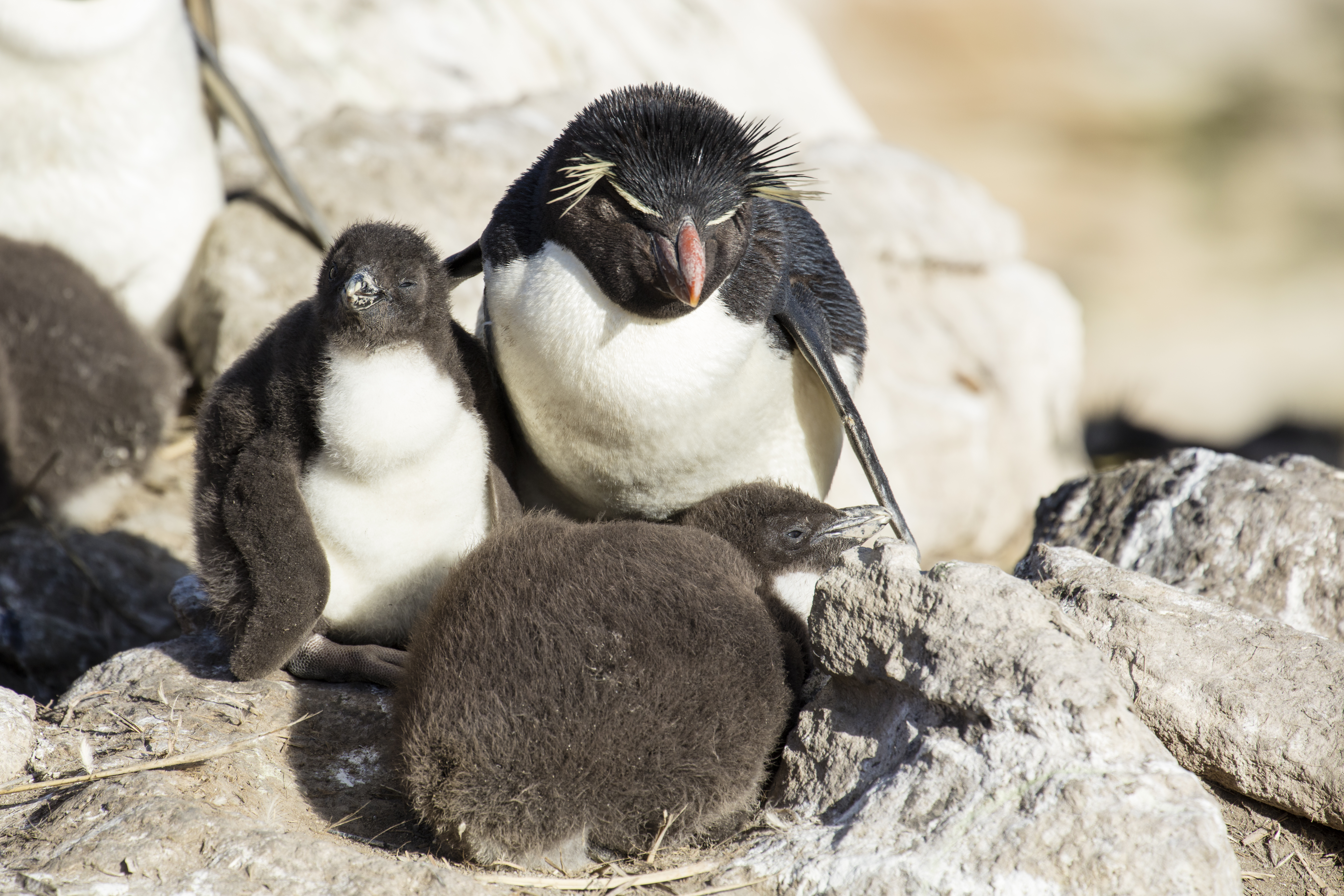
Rockhopper penguin with chicks, New Island, Falkland Islands

Rockhoppers are the most widespread crested penguins. Their range goes from the Antarctic front to the South Atlantic and Indian Oceans. Because of how widespread they are, breeding varies among the penguins in different areas. Northern Penguins begin the mating process two months earlier than Southern ones. Two eggs are usually laid a few days apart during early November in hope that at least one will survive, and the second egg is usually larger than the first. They will use the same nest as they did in previous years as well. Eggs hatch about a month later and the mother will have food for the chick.

== Taxonomy ==
There are currently 19 species and six genera of living penguins. The rockhopper penguin has 3 subspecies: Eudyptes filholi, the Eastern Rockhopper; Eudyptes mosleyi, the Northern Rockhopper; and the Eudyptes chrysocome, the Southern Rockhopper. They are separated by their locations of breeding. There are four other species in the genus Eudyptes: E. pachyrhynchus, E. robustus, E. chrysolophus, and E. schlegeli. The three subspecies of the rockhopper penguin are believed to have split up because of latitude and watermasses rather than because of geographic distances. Research suggests that during the early Pleistocene, the Southern Ocean was cold and rockhopper populations from the Atlantic and Indian Oceans remained undifferentiated and lived in the same watermass. The mid-Pleistocene climatic transition was associated with the southward migration of frontal positions and islands became surrounded by subtropical water masses, resulting in a split between Northern and Southern rockhopper penguins. Many advance and retreat cycles of Patagonian icecaps during the late Pleistocene may have created a barrier to gene flow between Southern Pacific and Southern Atlantic populations, causing a split between Southern and Eastern rockhopper populations.

== Predators ==
Adult Rockhopper penguins have no land-based predators. They are eaten when at sea by leopard seals, fur seals, killer whales and blue sharks. Chicks and eggs are eaten by many birds including giant petrels, skuas, sheathbills and various types of gulls.

== Conservation ==
Although the rockhopper penguin is one of the world's most numerous penguin populations, it is estimated that the population declined by some 30 percent over the final 30 years of the 20th century. The cause of this decline is mainly unknown, but scientists have speculated that humans are involved, mostly by commercial overfishing, oil exploitation, and pollution. Recent research has shown that rockhopper penguin population declines with changes in ocean surface temperature, indicating a direct impact from climate change. These activities have depleted much of the rockhopper penguin's food supply and raised the sea surface temperatures, and because this species is geographically isolated to the tip of South America and the Falkland Islands and is very sensitive to food web changes, there is little foreseeable opportunity for the penguins to recover.

=== Oil spills ===
An oil spill followed the grounding of the MS Oliva off Nightingale Island in 2011, which resulted in thousands of Rockhopper penguins becoming oiled. Oil spills have impacted many penguin species since the conversion of shipping from sail and coal propulsion to liquid-based fuels in the early 20th century.

== Gallery ==
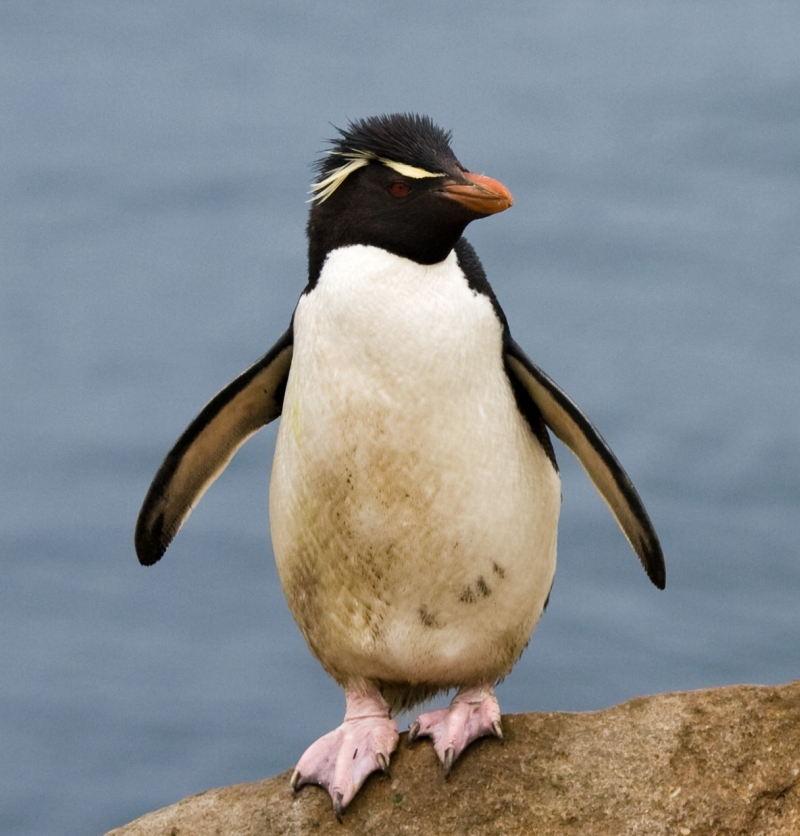
Southern rockhopper penguin, Eudyptes (chrysocome) chrysocome

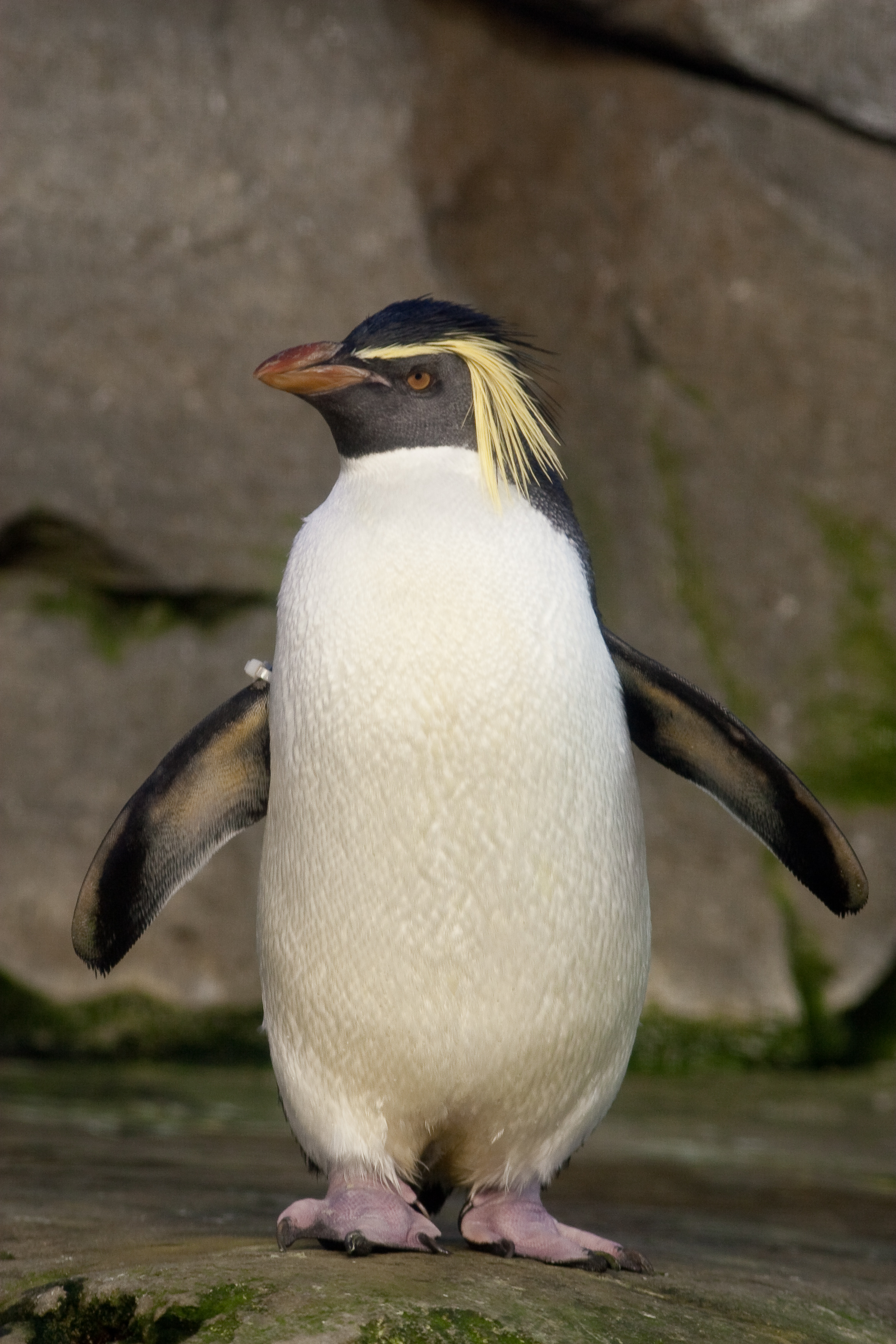
Northern rockhopper penguin, Eudyptes (chrysocome) moseleyi

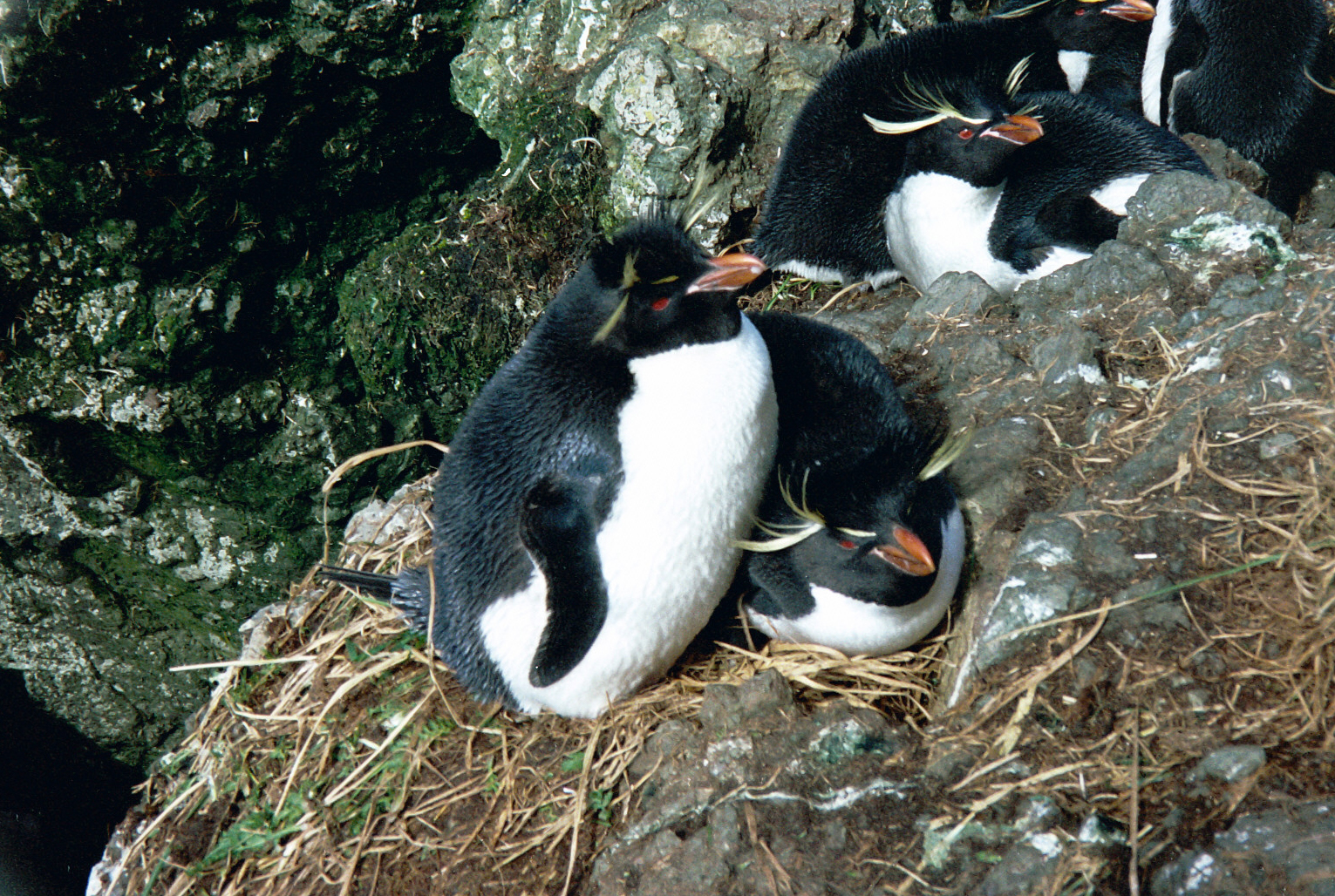
Eastern rockhopper penguin, Eudyptes (chrysocome) filholi

== In films ==
Rockhoppers are seen in the films, The Pebble and the Penguin, Happy Feet and Happy Feet 2, Surf's Up and Surf's Up 2: WaveMania, and The Wild.

== See also ==
- Rockhopper
- Macaroni penguin
- Northern rockhopper penguin
