= List of sounds and inlets of Fiordland =

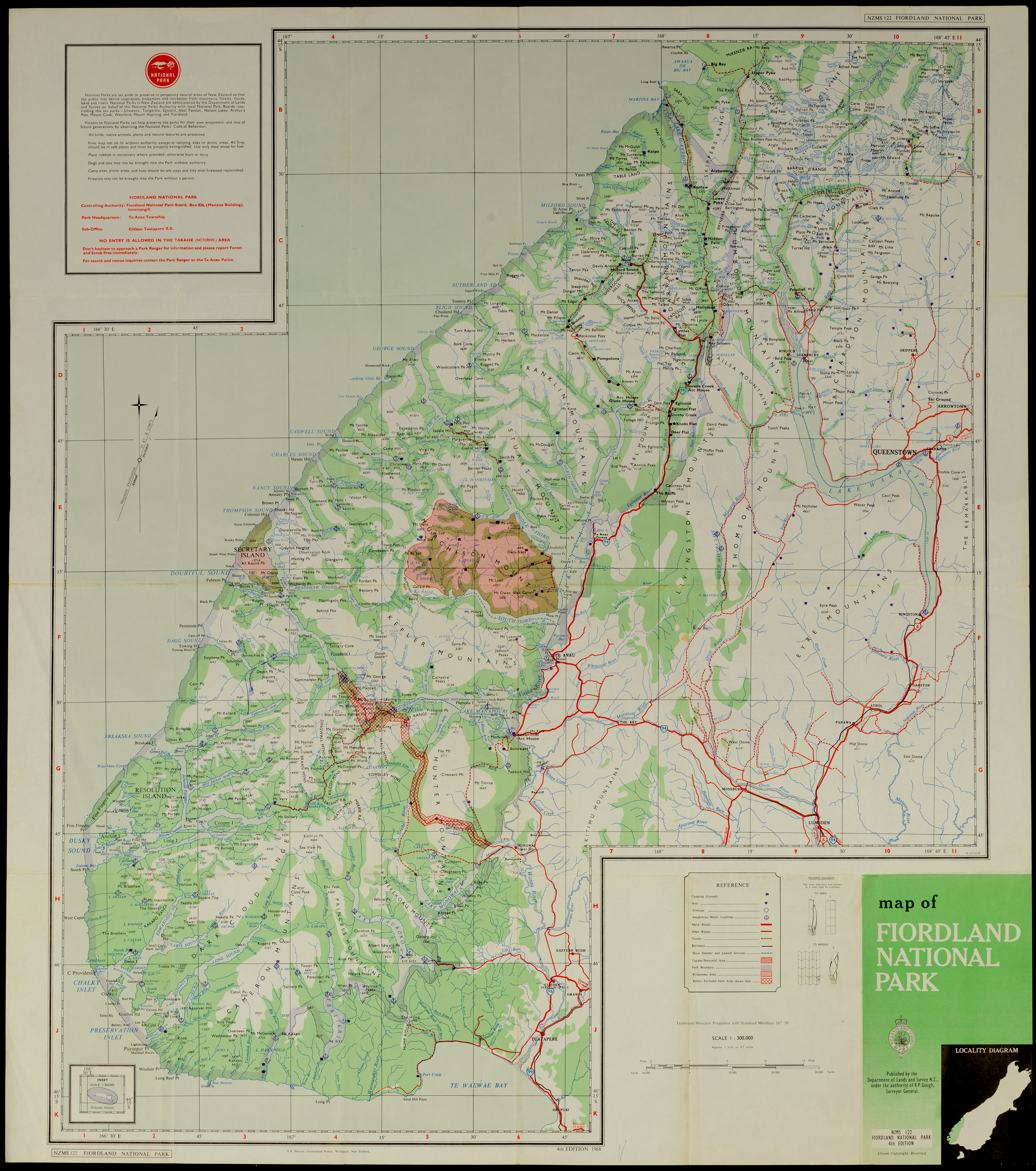
Map of Fiordland National Park

The following is a list of the sounds and inlets or similar features which punctuate the coast of Fiordland, in southwestern New Zealand, in geographic order from north to south:

- Big Bay
- Martins Bay
- Milford Sound
- Poison Bay
- Sutherland Sound
- Hāwea / Bligh Sound
  - Bounty Haven
- George Sound
  - South West Arm
- Looking Glass Bay
- Caswell Sound
- Charles Sound
  - Emelius Arm
- Hinenui / Nancy Sound
  - Foot Arm
- Thompson Sound
  - Bradshaw Sound (also Doubtful Sound)
    - Precipice Cove
    - Gaer Arm
- Doubtful Sound / Patea, and its arms:
  - Malaspina Reach
    - Hall Arm
    - Crooked Arm
  - First Arm
- Dagg Sound
  - Anchorage Arm
- Breaksea Sound, and its arms:
  - Vancouver Arm
  - Broughton Arm
  - Acheron Passage (linked to Dusky Sound)
    - Wet Jacket Arm
- Tamatea / Dusky Sound
  - Supper Cove
  - Fanny Bay
  - Cascade Cove
- Taiari / Chalky Inlet, and its arms:
  - Moana-whenua-pōuri / Edwardson Sound
  - Te Korowhakaunu / Kanáris Sound
- Rakituma / Preservation Inlet, and its arms:
  - Isthmus Sound
  - Useless Bay
  - Te Awaroa / Long Sound
- Lake Hakapoua (divided from sea by a landslide in 1915)

Many of the sounds and inlets were given dual names in 2019.
