= List of fiords of New Zealand =

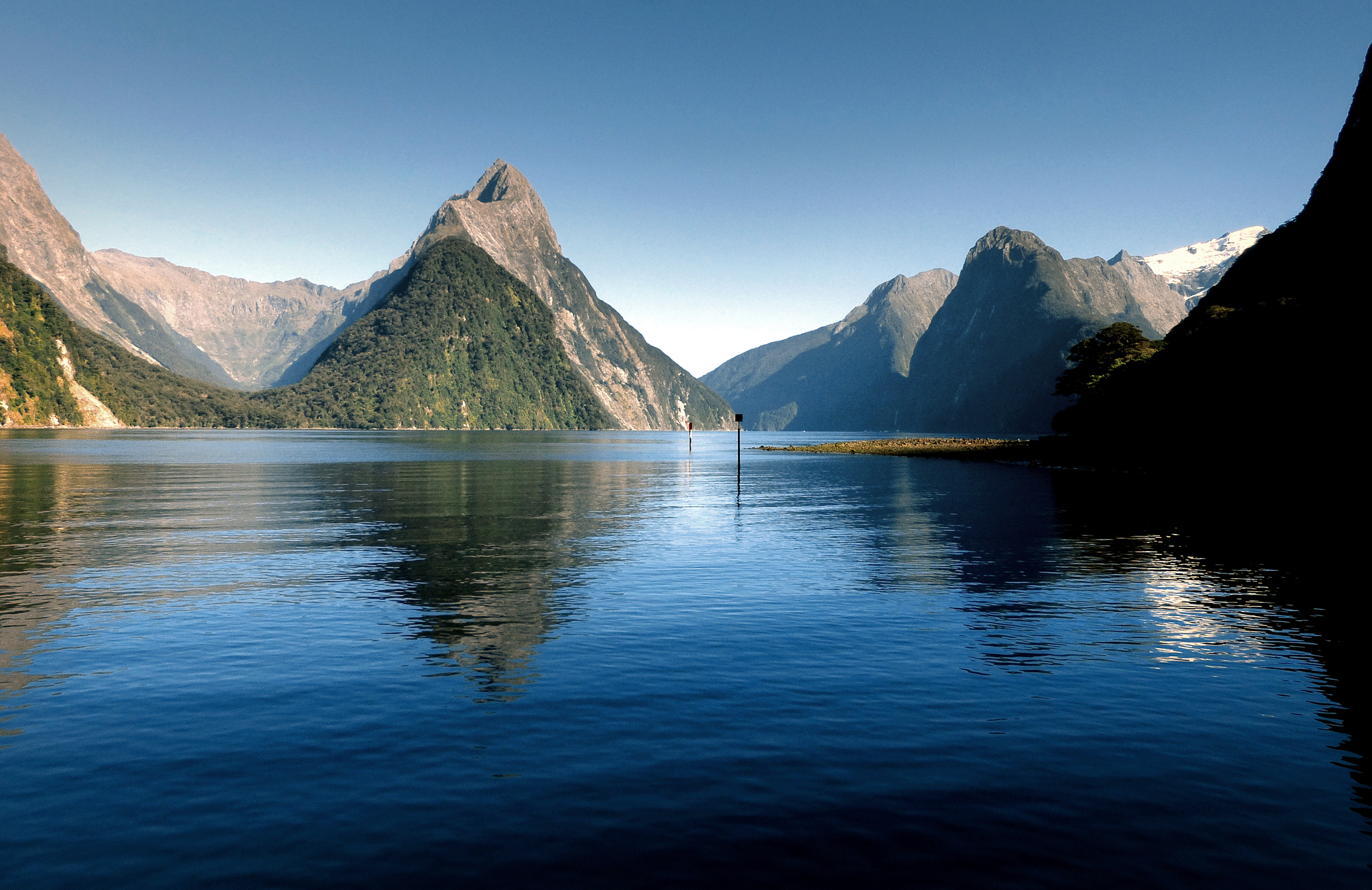
Of the twelve major fiords on Fiordland's west coast, Milford Sound is the most famous.

The fiords of New Zealand (Māori: tai matapari "bluff sea") are all located in the southwest of the South Island, in a mountainous area known as Fiordland. A fiord is a narrow inlet of the sea between cliffs or steep slopes, which results from marine inundation of a glaciated valley. The spelling fiord is used in New Zealand rather than fjord, although all the maritime fiords instead use the word sound in their name.

The Marlborough Sounds, a series of deep indentations in the coastline at the northern tip of the South Island, are in fact drowned river valleys, or rias. The deeply indented coastlines of Northland and Auckland also host many rias, such as the Hokianga and Waitematā Harbours.

New Zealand has fifteen named maritime fiords, listed here from northernmost to southernmost.

== List ==
Name	Location	Length	Area
Milford Sound / Piopiotahi	44°38′0″S 167°53′0″E	17.5 kilometres (10.9 mi)	25.3 km^{2}
Te Hāpua / Sutherland Sound	44°46′22″S 167°37′14″E	10 kilometres (6.2 mi)	11 km^{2}
Hāwea / Bligh Sound	44°47′4″S 167°30′28″E	18 kilometres (11 mi)	21.1 km^{2}
Te Houhou / George Sound	44°52′36″S 167°21′48″E	20.5 kilometres (12.7 mi)	32.9 km^{2}
Taitetimu / Caswell Sound	45°1′6.6″S 167°10′55.56″E	15 kilometres (9.3 mi)	17.5 km^{2}
Taiporoporo / Charles Sound	45°5′0″S 167°6′49″E	14 kilometres (8.7 mi)	15.9 km^{2}
Hinenui / Nancy Sound	45°8′44.5″S 167°4′23″E	15 kilometres (9.3 mi)	13.9 km^{2}
Te Awa-o-Tū / Thompson Sound	45°13′27″S 166°58′16″E	18 kilometres (11 mi)	28.4 km^{2}
Kaikiekie / Bradshaw Sound	45°17′0″S 167°6′3″E	18.5 kilometres (11.5 mi)	20.9 km^{2}
Doubtful Sound / Patea	45°22′57″S 167°5′28″E	40 kilometres (25 mi) (to head of Hall Arm)	83.7 km^{2}
Te Rā / Dagg Sound	45°23′51″S 166°48′47″E	14 kilometres (8.7 mi)	14.7 km^{2}
Te Puaitaha / Breaksea Sound	45°32′52″S 166°52′22″E	30.5 kilometres (19.0 mi)	61.5 km^{2}
Tamatea / Dusky Sound	45°45′35″S 166°37′36″E	40 kilometres (25 mi)	181 km^{2}
Taiari / Chalky Inlet	46°0′54″S 166°34′50.52″E	27.7 kilometres (17.2 mi)	110 km^{2}
Rakituma / Preservation Inlet	46°4′46.56″S 166°41′14.28″E	36.5 kilometres (22.7 mi)	93 km^{2}

Thompson Sound separates Secretary Island from the mainland and connects with Doubtful Sound and Bradshaw Sound at its inland end. The mouth of Bradshaw Sound is on Doubtful Sound approximately 12 km from the Tasman Sea.

== Freshwater fiords ==
A number of lakes in the Fiordland and Otago regions also fill glacial valleys. Lake Te Anau has three western arms which are fiords (and are named so). Lake McKerrow to the north of Milford Sound is a fiord with a silted-up mouth. Lake Wakatipu fills a large glacial valley, as do lakes Hakapoua, Poteriteri, Monowai and Hauroko in the far south of Fiordland. Lake Manapouri has fiords as its West, North and South arms.
