= Mount Damper Falls =

Waterfall in Taranaki, New Zealand

Coordinates: 38°55′11.9″S 174°47′18.3″E

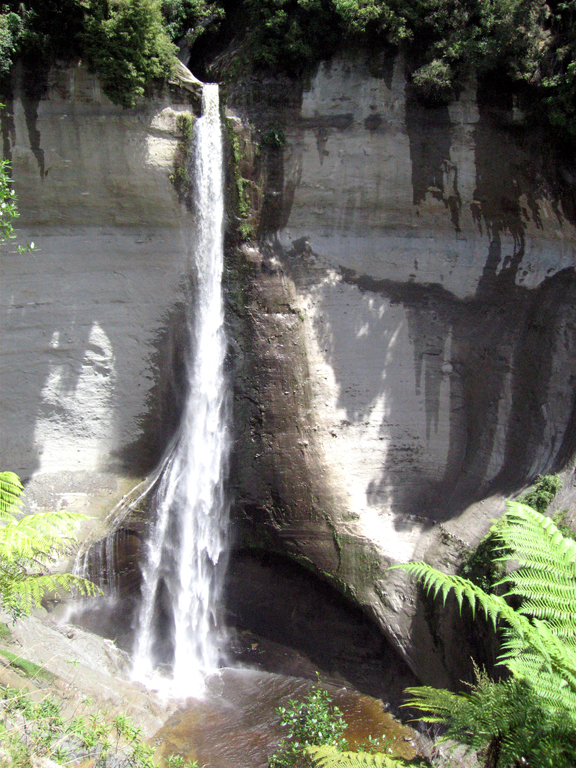
Mount Damper Falls, Summer 2007

Mount Damper Falls is a waterfall in the North Island of New Zealand on a tributary, Mount Damper Stream, of the Tongapōrutu River.

== Location ==
The falls are located on a walking track about 1 km from the intersection of Okau and Mangapapa Roads on State Highway 43 in the Stratford District in Taranaki. At 74 metres, the falls are one of the highest in the North Island, although they rank behind Wairere, Ananui and Waitakere Falls. The falls form part of Highway 43's heritage trails.

The access track crosses privately owned land and is maintained by the Department of Conservation. Access is closed to hunters every year from 1 August to 31 October for the lambing season.

== Discovery ==
The falls are near the Tihi-Manuka trail, which was used by local Maori as the main route between the Taumaranui area and the north Taranaki coast. The first European to discover the falls was government surveyor, L C Sladden, in 1900 when surveying the Waro Survey District. They were rediscovered around 1909 when an early settler H W Wilkinson's prize sheep dog, Lassie, died when dragged over by a wild boar.

== See also ==
- List of waterfalls
- Waterfalls of New Zealand
