= Kutu Parera (Gaer Arm) Marine Reserve =

Marine reserve in Fiordland, South Island, New Zealand

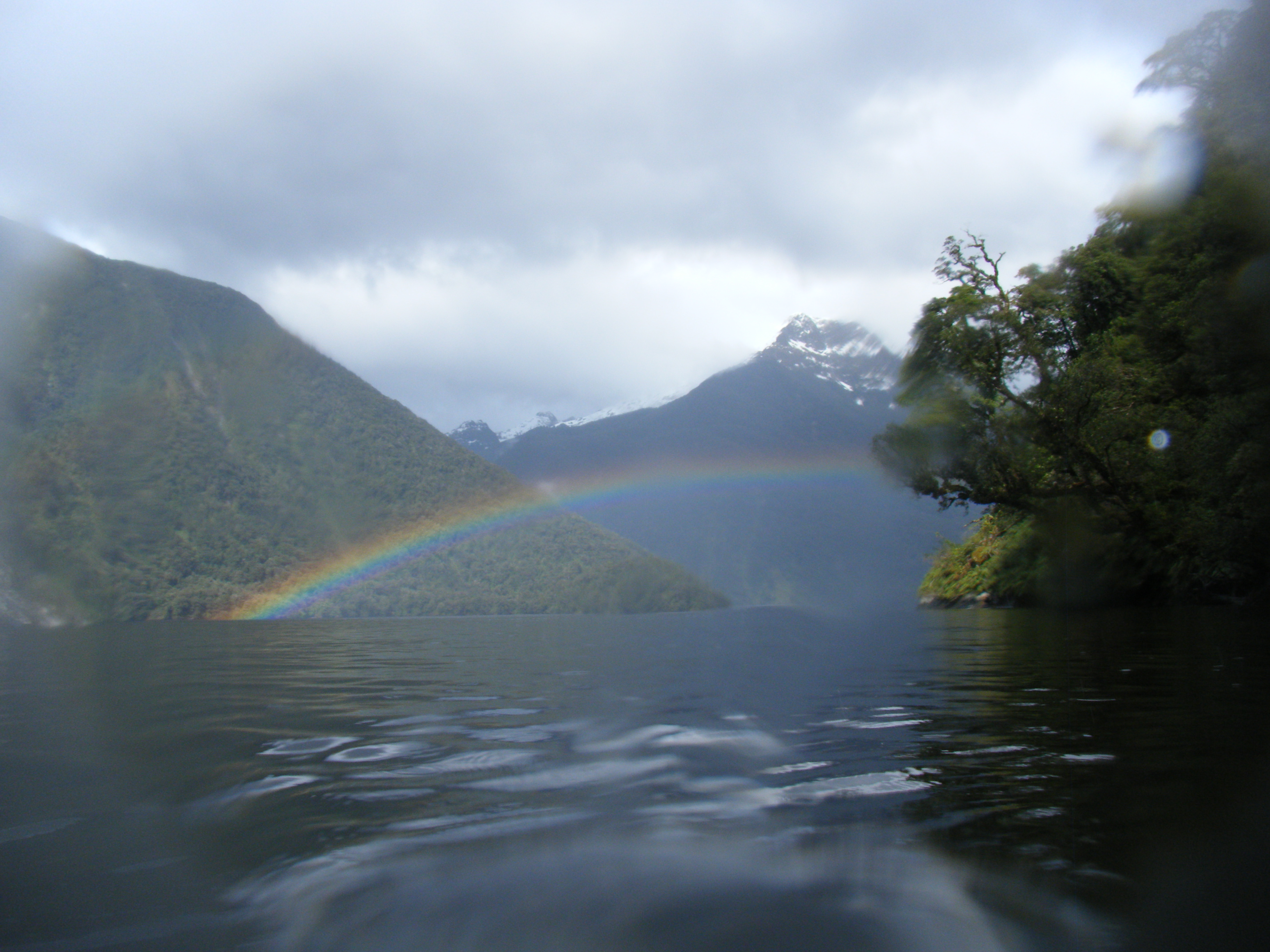
- Bradshaw Sound

- Location within South Island
- Location: Fiordland, New Zealand
- Coordinates: 45.309619°S 167.160732°E
- Area: 433 hectares (1,070 acres)
- Established: 2005
- Governing body: Department of Conservation

Kutu Parera (Gaer Arm) Marine Reserve is a marine reserve covering an area of 433 hectares (1,070 acres) at Gaer Arm in the Bradshaw Sound of Fiordland on New Zealand's South Island. It was established in 2005 and is administered by the Department of Conservation.

== Geography and ecology ==
In the fiords, heavy rainfall runs off from the surrounding mountains creates a permanent freshwater layer to about 5 centimetres (2.0 in) to 10 metres (33 ft) below the surface. A layer of calm, clear and warm seawater provides a habitat for a range of sponges, corals and fish to about 40 metres (130 ft) below the surface. A final layer of seawater, too darkened by tannins from vegetation run-off to support most marine life, extends to depths of up to 400 metres (1,300 ft).

The marine reserve contains a range of habitats, including the Camelot River estuary. It has a shallow basin and sediment fan, before dropping to depths of 100 metres (330 ft) at the entrance to Gaer Arm. The basin has some of the largest populations of cockle and pipi in Doubtful Sound, providing food for grouper, tarakihi and other fish. There are also areas of seagrass flats.

The eastern side of the reserve has an extensive rock wall, mostly facing south and shaded from direct sunlight, with vertical drops of 59–60 metres (194–197 ft). This provides a habitat for many sea anemones and other sessile suspension feeders.

The western side of the Gaer Arm has more broken rocky reef habitat, with underwater boulders and a river overflow.

== History ==
The Māori name Hāwea is after the ancient iwi of Kāti Hāwea.

The reserve was part of a conservation strategy the Fiordland Marine Guardians launched in 2002 and presented to the Ministry for the Environment Marian Hobbs and Minister of Fisheries Pete Hodgson in 2003. It was officially established on 21 April 2005.

The Ministry of Primary Industries, Fiordland Marine Guardians and other agencies are involved in protecting the marine reserve and stopping the spread of invasive seaweed.

The New Zealand Air Force conducted aerial surveillance patrols for illegal commercial fishing in 2021.

== Research ==
Educational and scientific activities are encouraged, but must not disturb or endanger plants, animals or natural features. Scientific research requires a permit from the Department of Conservation.

== Recreation ==
The reserve is accessible from Te Anau via the Milford Road. Anchoring boats is banned in many areas to protect the particularly fragile species that can be damaged by anchors or swinging chains. There also rules in place to minimise the impact of vessel activity on aihe (bottlenose dolphins). Taking off and landing aircraft is permitted.

The protected marine life can be viewed by diving or snorkelling, either independently or with a tourism or charter boat service. To protect the fragile environments, divers must follow the safety and care codes.

There is a ban on fishing, and taking, killing or moving marine life and materials. However, members of Ngāi Tahu may remove pounamu provided they have the right authorisation, only collect by hand, keep disturbance to the site to a minimum, and only carry as much as they can in one trip. They may also collect deceased marine mammals and collect teeth and bones.

== See also ==
- Marine reserves of New Zealand
