= Browne Falls =

Coordinates: 45°23′55″S 167°5′7″E

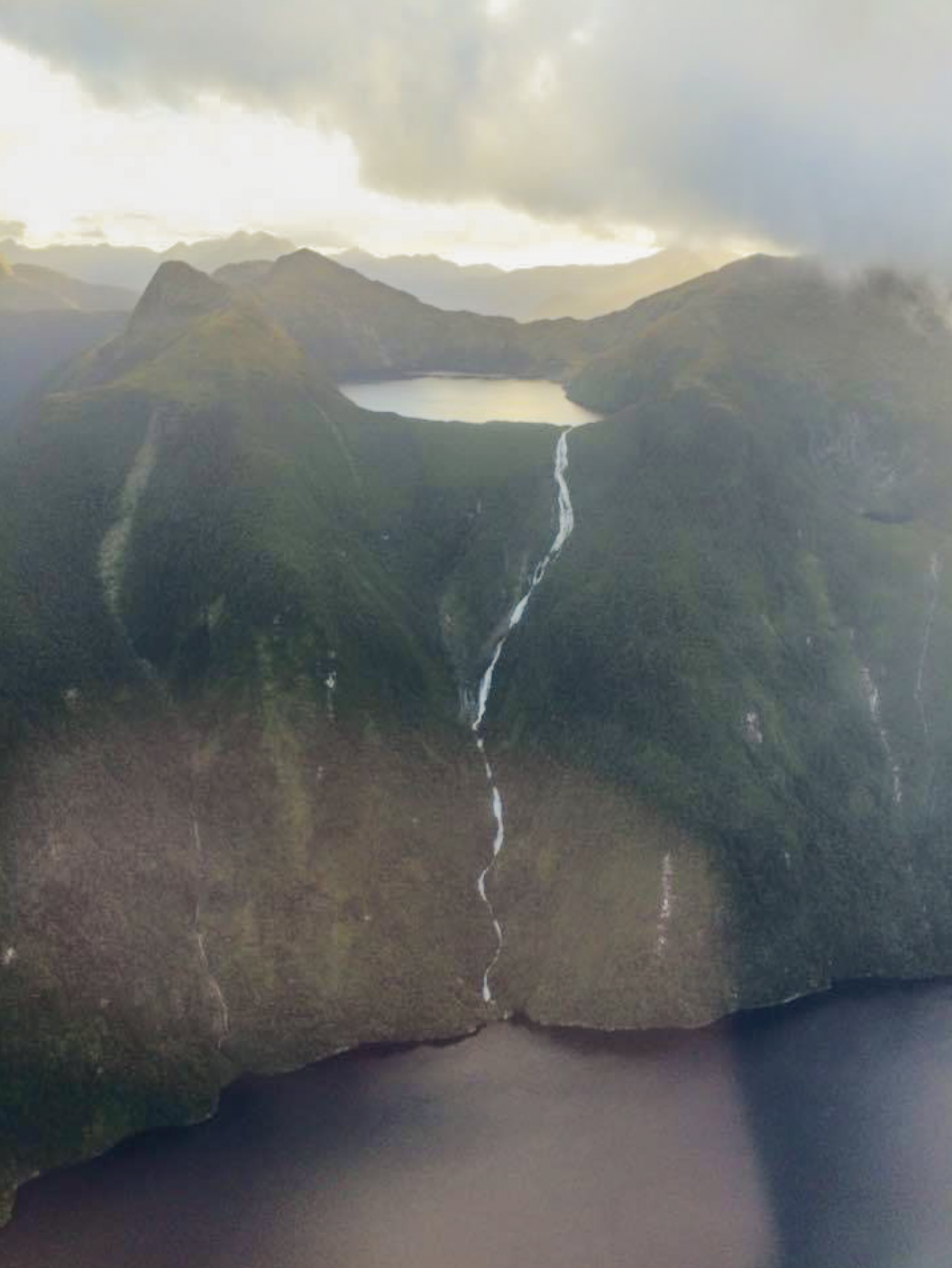
- Browne Falls from seaplane view
- Interactive map of Browne Falls
- Location: Doubtful Sound, New Zealand
- Type: Cascade
- Total height: 619 or 836 metres
- Number of drops: 6
- World height ranking: 10

Browne Falls is a waterfall above Doubtful Sound, which is located in Fiordland National Park, New Zealand. In a temperate rain forest, the falls cascade down to the fiord near Hall Arm. Heights of 619 metres and 836 metres have been given for the falls. Their source is a tarn called Lake Browne (836 m above sea level) which when full, overflows down the side of the mountain face (similar to Sutherland's source). The stream makes 836 m height difference over 1,130 m horizontal difference, thus the mean gradient of stream is 42 degrees. This comparatively low angle makes the falls less impressive.

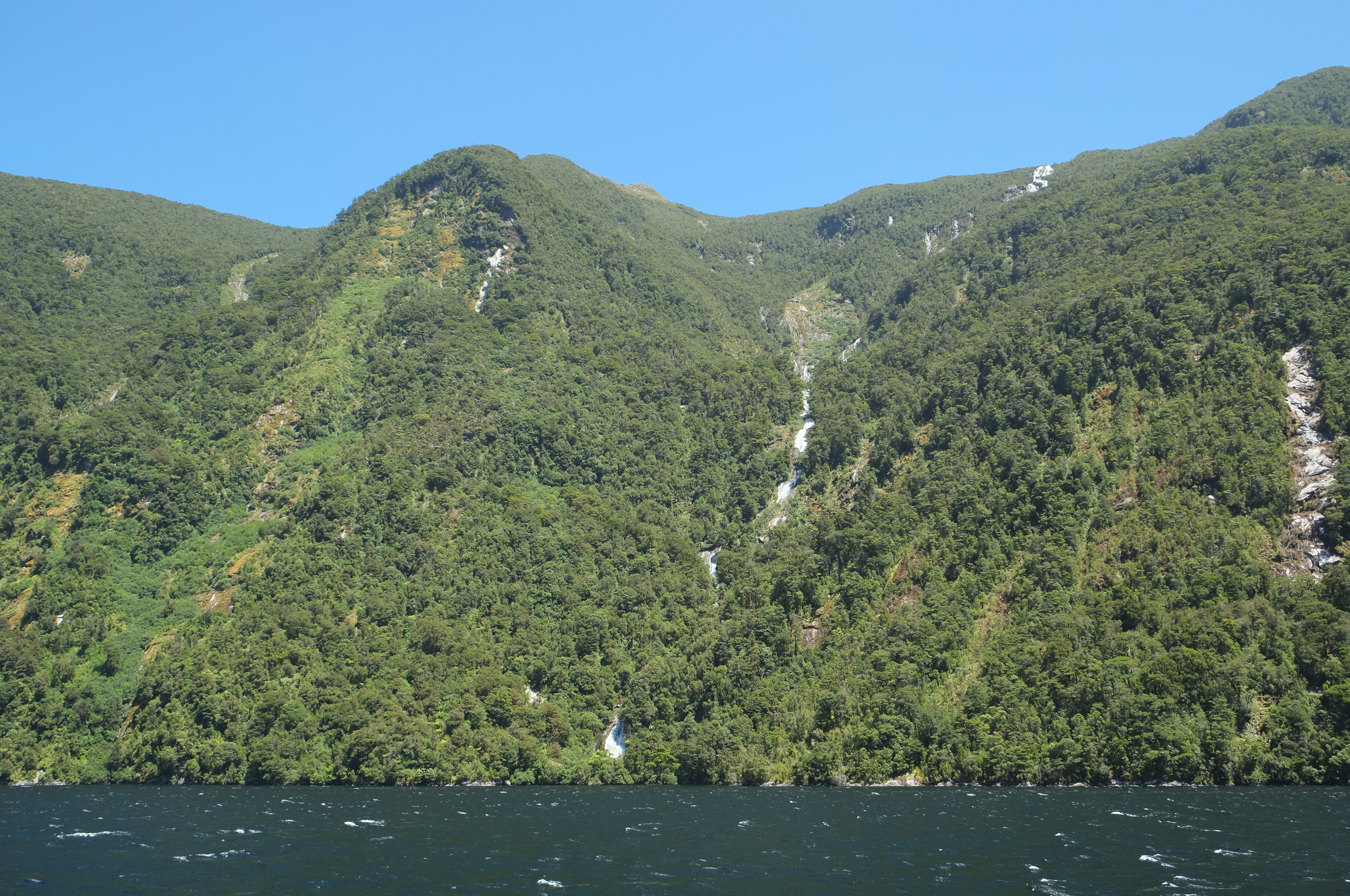
View of Browne Falls from Doubtful Sound

The falls are one of the two candidates for the title of New Zealand's highest waterfall. The other is sourced from a tarn behind Elizabeth Island which is also in Fiordland.

The falls are named after pioneering aerial photographer, Victor Carlyle Browne, who discovered Lake Browne and the associated falls on one of his flights over Fiordland in the 1940s.

There are at least two other notable waterfalls falling to Doubtful Sound: Helena Falls and Lady Alice Falls.

== Natural history ==
There is a diversity of plant and birdlife in the vicinity and watershed of Browne Falls. Extensive stands of nothofagus dominated trees are present along with a wide variety of understory ferns and shrubs; examples of the forest floor vegetation include crown fern (Lomaria discolor).

== See also ==
- List of waterfalls
- List of waterfalls by height
- Waterfalls of New Zealand
