= Wilmot Pass =

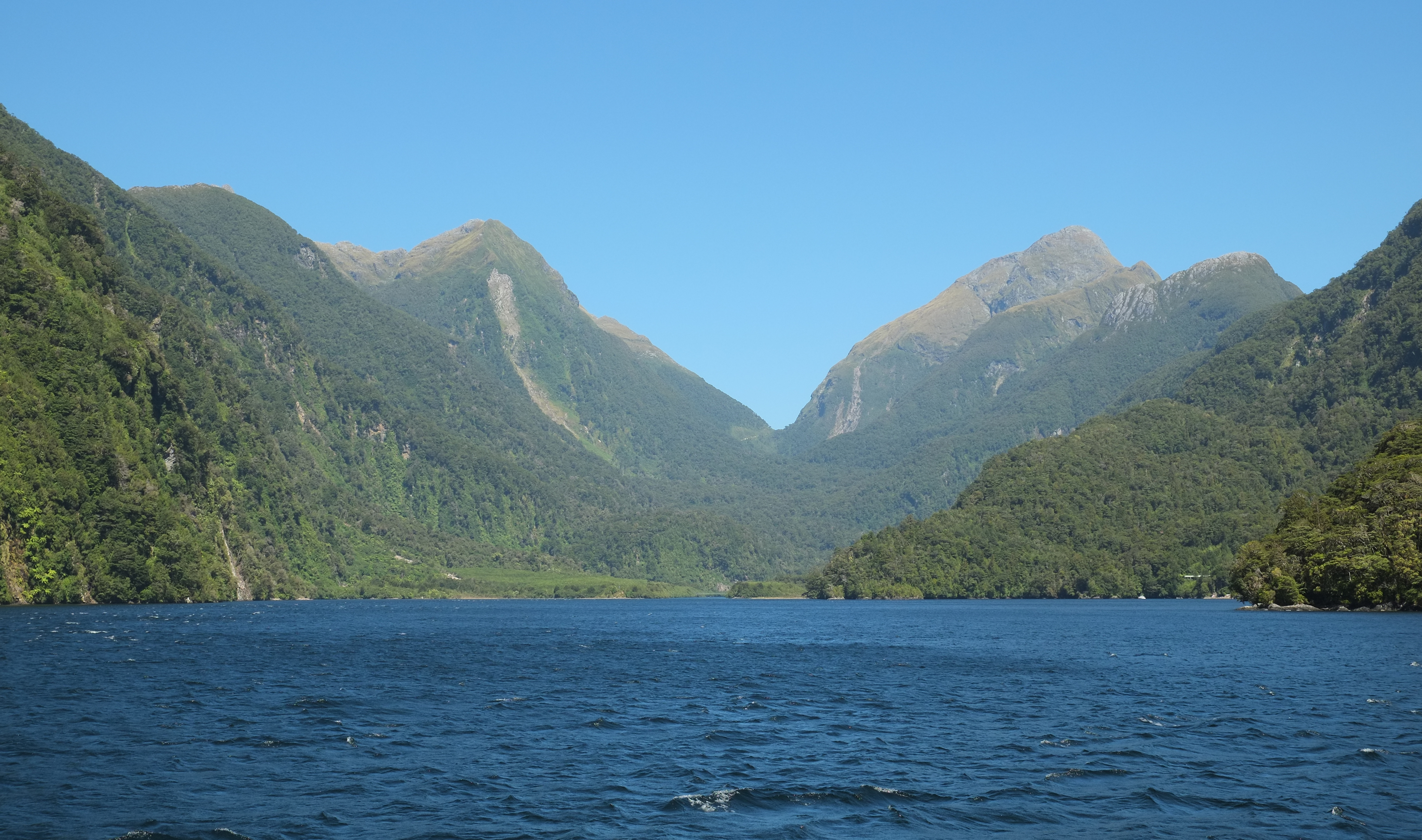
- Wilmot Pass as seen from Doubtful Sound

- Location within New Zealand
- Elevation: 671 m (2,201 ft)
- Traversed by: Wilmot Pass Road

Third Approach
- Location: Southland, South Island, New Zealand
- Range: Matterhorn Mountains
- Coordinates: 45°30′30″S 167°11′33″E

The Wilmot Pass is a 671 m (2,201 ft) high pass on the main divide of New Zealand's South Island. It connects Doubtful Sound, a deep indentation in the coast of Fiordland, to the valley of the West Arm of Lake Manapouri. The pass is named after E. H. Wilmot, a former surveyor-general of New Zealand, who had noted it while surveying the area in 1897. It lies between Mount Wilmot and Mount Mainwaring. On the east side the Spey River drains to Lake Manapouri and on the west side the Lyvia River drains to Deep Cove.

== History ==
University of Otago Professor Mainwaring-Brown died while exploring the area to the west of Lake Manapouri in 1888. Mount Mainwaring, on the north side of the pass, is named in his honour. R. Murrell was the first European to ascend the pass while searching for Mainwaring-Brown the same year. E. H. Wilmot, who was to become Surveyor General of New Zealand in 1914, surveyed the area extensively in 1897. Tracks were cut to both Doubtful and Dusky Sounds and huts established, but these fell into disrepair. In 1921 Leslie Murrell established a tourist lodge at Deep Cove, reopened the track and conducted walking trips from Manapouri. The Manapouri-Doubtful Sound Tourist Company later took over operations, building additional huts.

== Road ==
The pass is crossed by a gravel road which was constructed to facilitate development of the Manapouri Hydroelectricity Project. The road is notable as being the only road on the New Zealand mainland which is disconnected from the rest of the roading network. The road is home to several waterfalls, notably the Stella Falls.

Until the 1960s, the Wilmot Pass was only accessible from the sea or via the Wilmot Pass walking track. The 21 km unsealed road was constructed between 1963 and 1965 to accommodate heavy equipment transporters moving equipment loads of up to 97 tonnes from ships off-loading at Doubtful Sound for the construction on the Manapouri Underground Powerstation. The Wilmot Pass road remains the only way to haul equipment to and from the Manapouri Power Station that would be too heavy for ferrying across Lake Manapouri. From south, the only land-based connection to the power station is via Percy Saddle, where the track is little more than a marked route.

A number of tour operators now transport tourists across Lake Manapouri by boat and over the Wilmot Pass by bus to lodges or a variety of boats and yachts on Doubtful Sound for day and overnight cruises. The buses used for these tours are stationed at the Lake Manapouri end of the road.

Two 10-kilometre (6.2 mi) tailrace tunnels connect the sound with the lake deep under the mountains north of the pass. The first tunnel was completed in late 1969, a year before the power station became operational, and the second tunnel was built between 1997 and 2002.

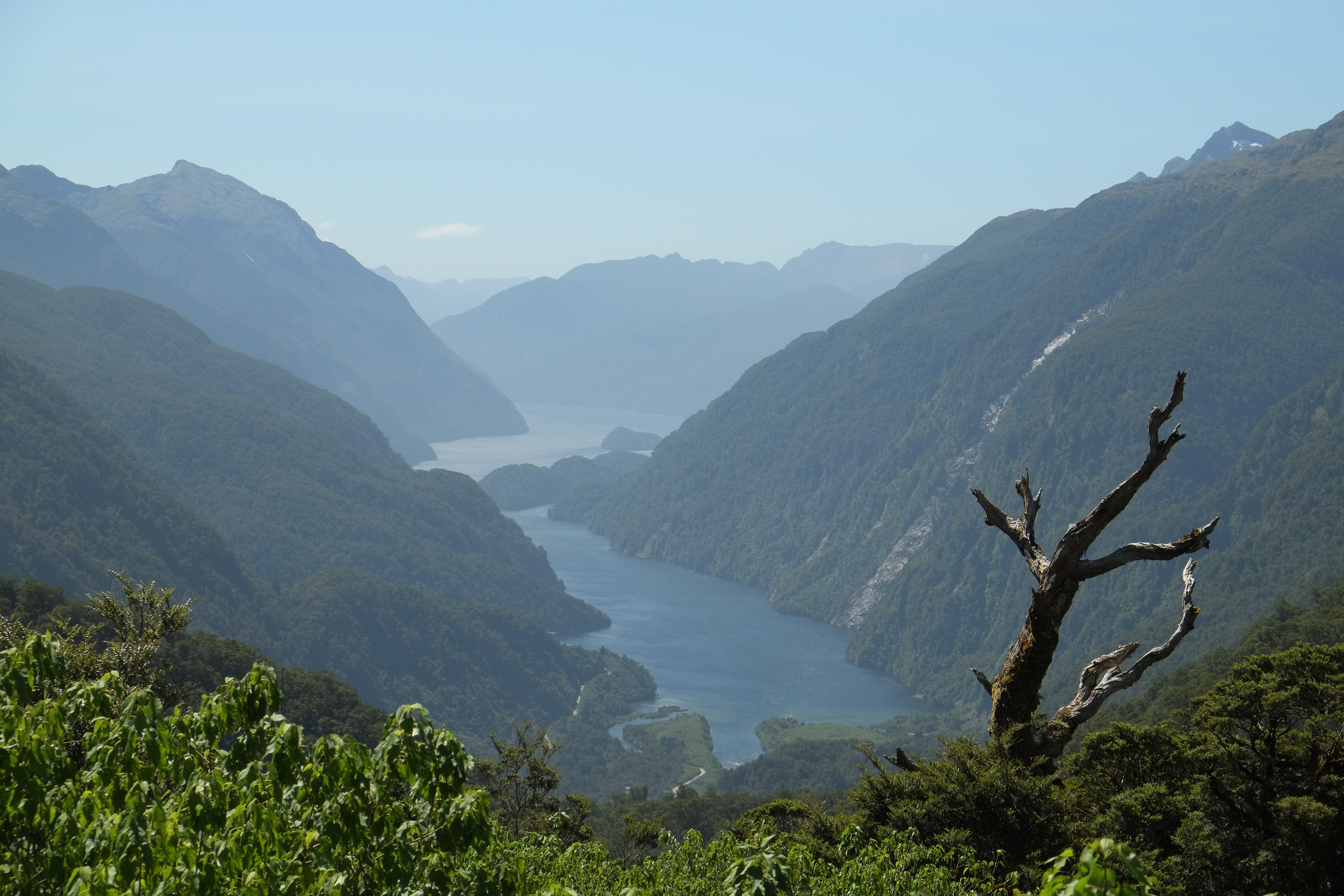
View from Wilmot Pass to Doubtful Sound

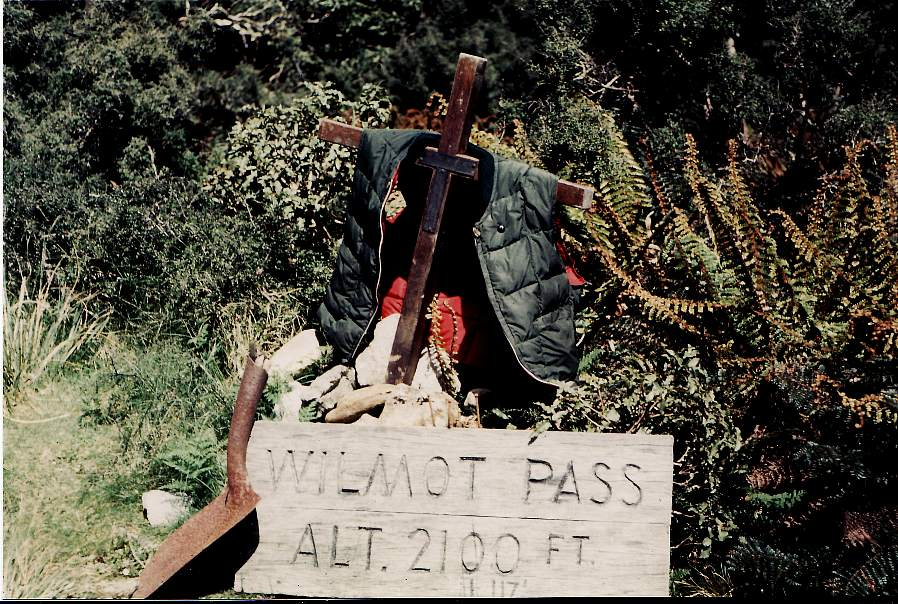
The old Pass marker

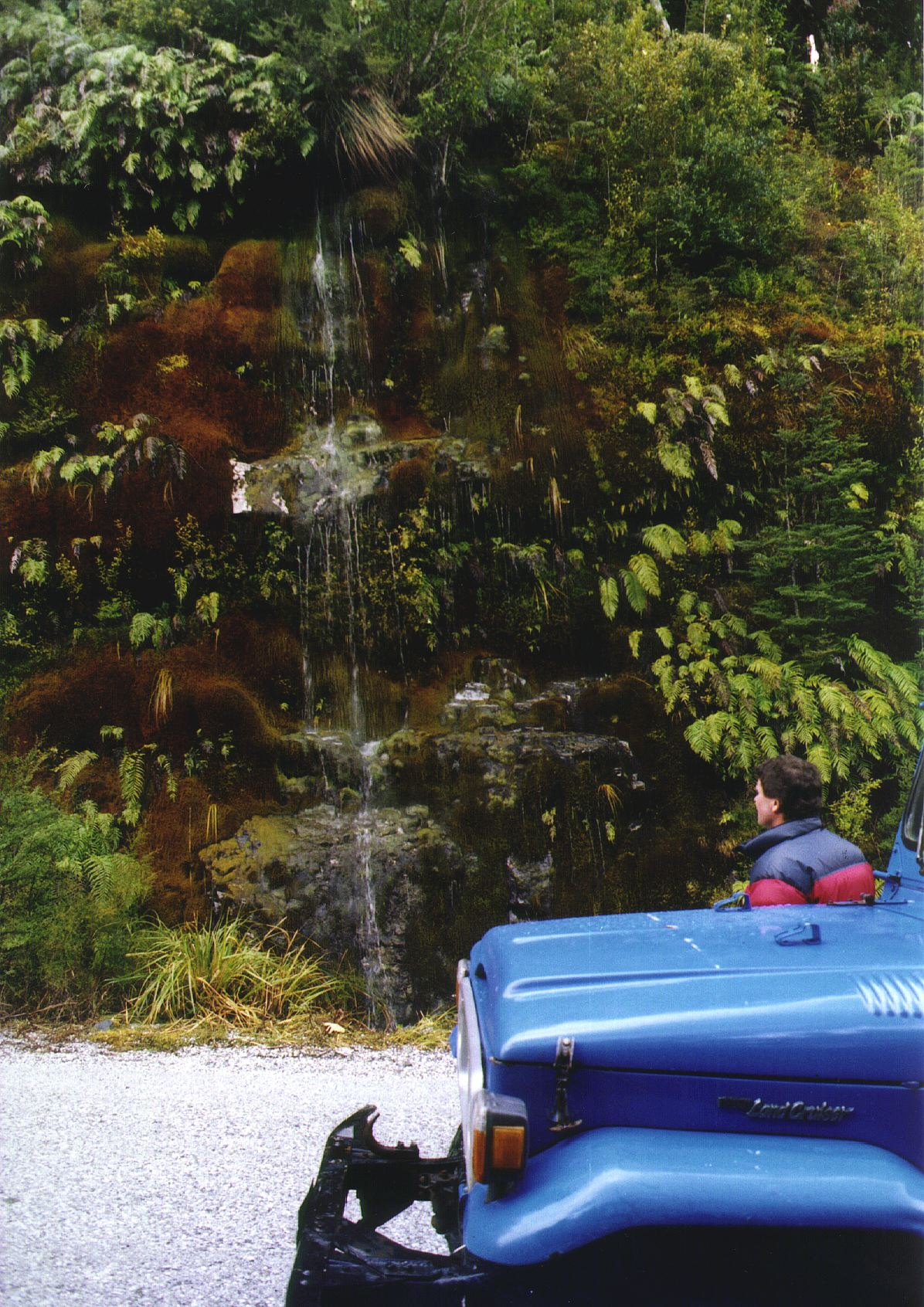
Lemin's moss garden on the Wilmot Pass Road, in the heart of Fiordland National Park
