= Rea River =

- Route of the Rea River
- Mouth of the Rea River Rea River (South Island) Rea River (Fiordland)

Location
- Country: New Zealand

Physical characteristics
- Source
  - coordinates: 45°12′41″S 167°09′32″E
- Mouth
  - location: Misty River
  - coordinates: 45°13′59″S 167°10′45″E

Basin features
- Progression: Rea River → Misty River → Kaikiekie / Bradshaw Sound → Tasman Sea

The Rea River is a river in Fiordland, New Zealand. It rises west of Teardrop Lake and flows into Misty River before it enters Kaikiekie / Bradshaw Sound.

== See also ==
- List of rivers of New Zealand
