= List of waterfalls in New Zealand =

New Zealand, according to the gazetteer maintained by Land Information New Zealand has "249 named waterfalls and 31 named rapids". There are perhaps seven named "Bridal Veil", and 17 whose names include "Rere" meaning "to leap or descend". In the North Island only 18 of 130 have non-Māori names (including 5 clustered around Mount Taranaki), but in the South Island only 15 of the 150 named waterfalls (or rapids) have retained their Māori name.

There are disagreements on what constitutes a waterfall. For example, the Browne Falls is claimed by some to be a waterfall with a drop of 800 metres. Other sources describe it as a steep stream with numerous small cataracts.

== List of waterfalls ==
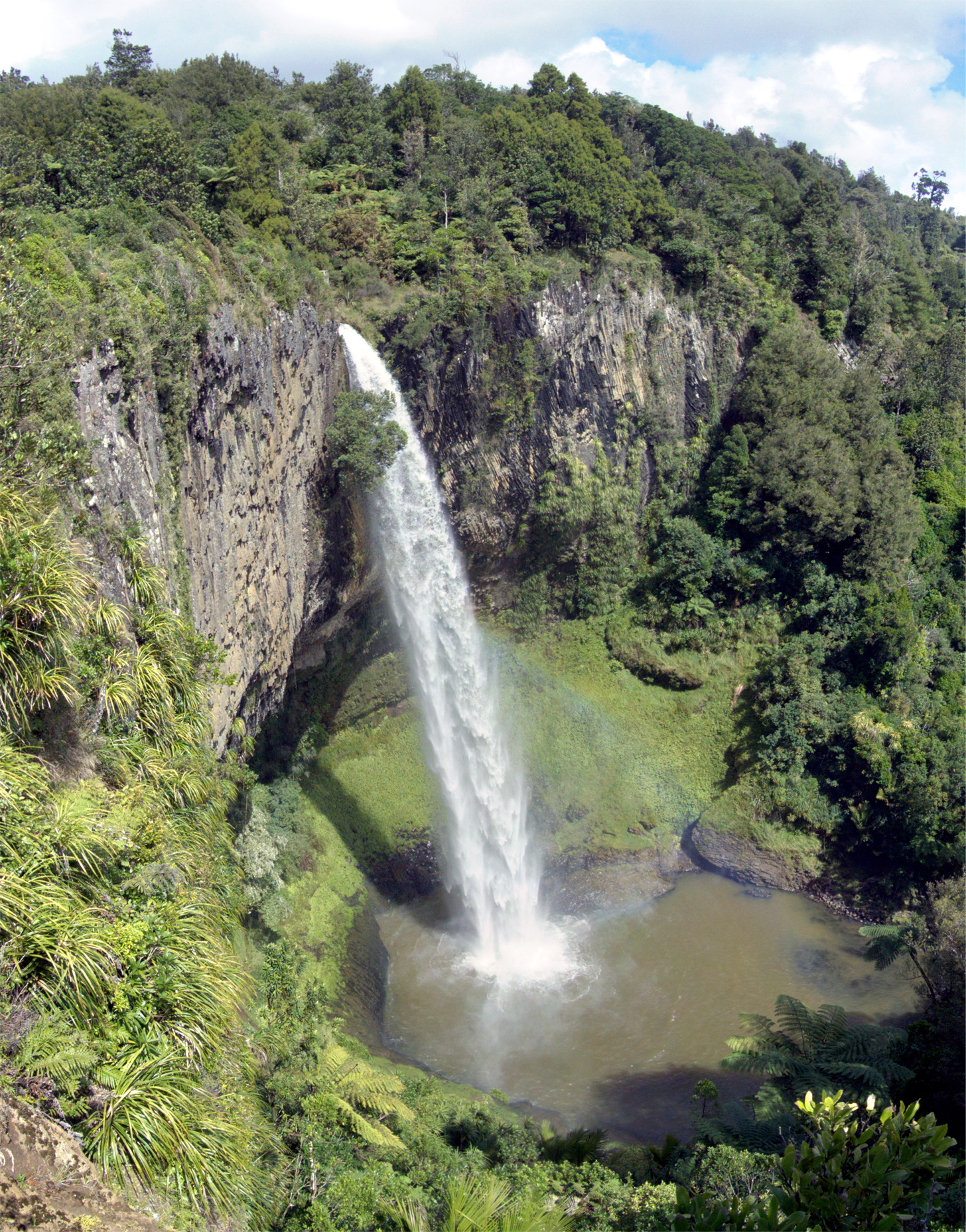
Wairēinga / Bridal Veil Falls

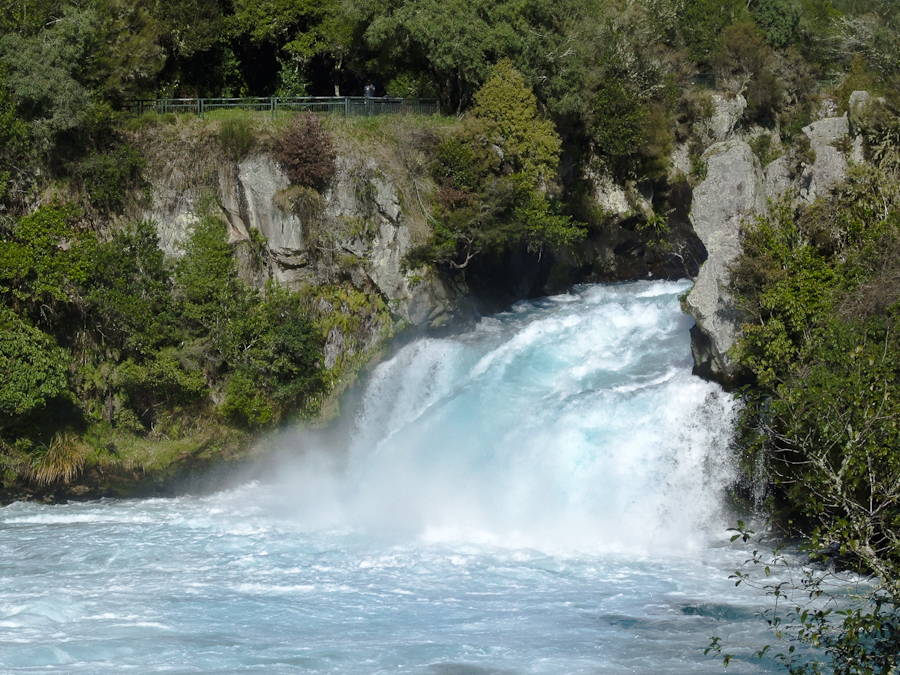
Huka Falls

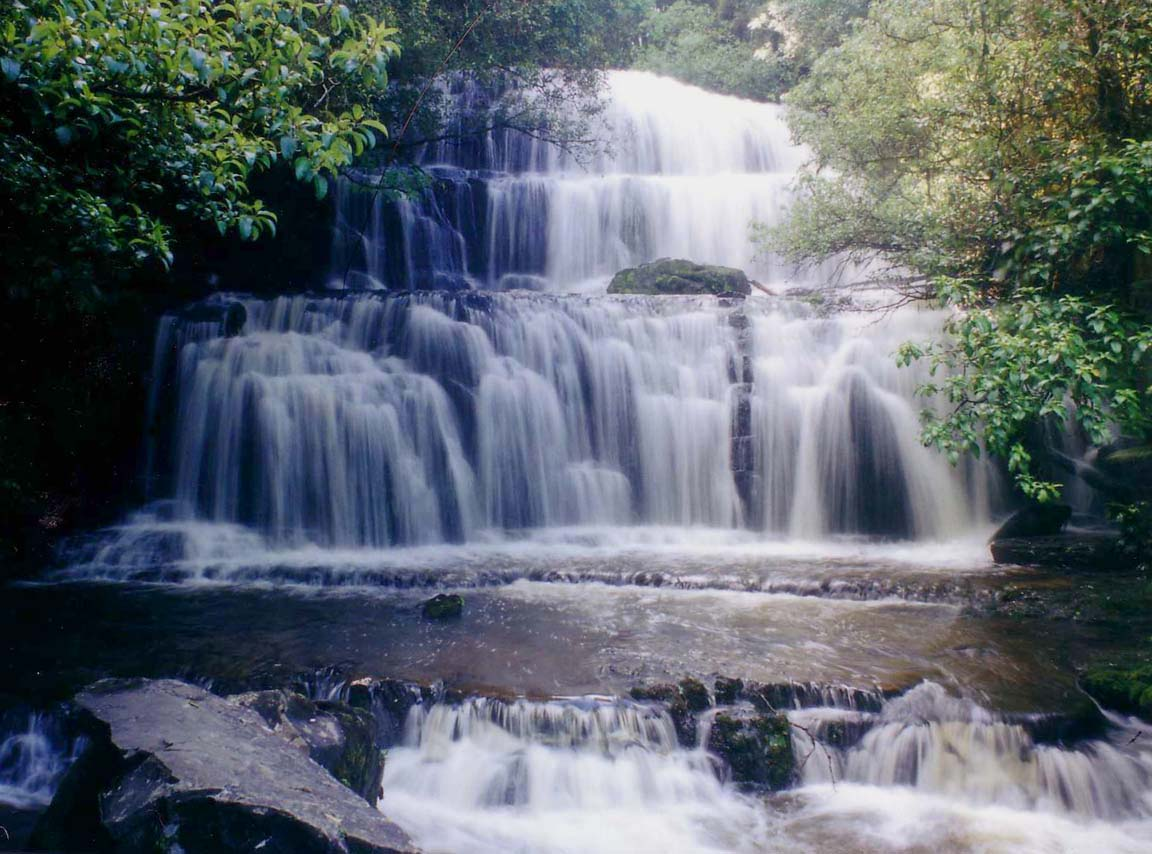
Purakaunui Falls

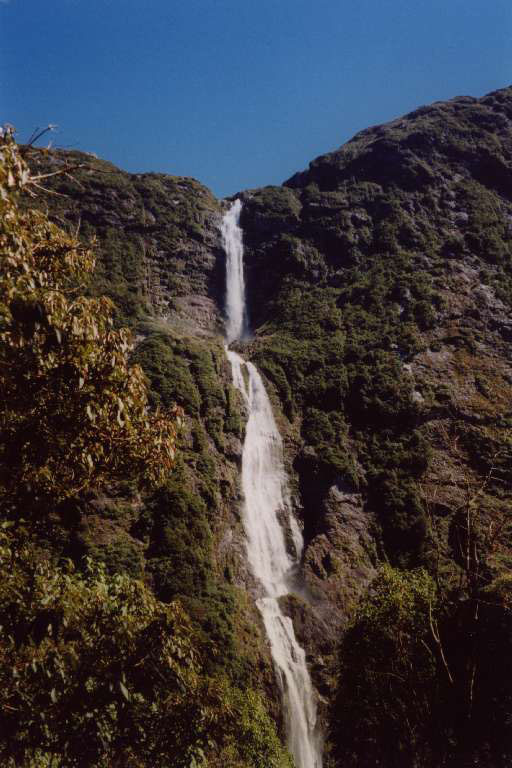
Sutherland Falls

This is a list of notable waterfalls in New Zealand. Many of the highest waterfalls are in Fiordland.

Name	Height	Location
Ananui Falls	106 metres (348 ft)	South Auckland
Āniwaniwa Falls	15 metres (49 ft)	Hawke's Bay Region
Bowen Falls	162 metres (531 ft)	Fiordland National Park, Southland Region
Bridal Veil Falls	55 metres (180 ft)	Waikato Region
Browne Falls	836 metres (2,743 ft)	Fiordland National Park, Southland Region
Chamberlain Falls	700 metres (2,300 ft)	Fiordland National Park, Southland Region
Fairy Falls	15 metres (49 ft)	Auckland Region
Fantail Falls	23 metres (75 ft)	Mount Aspiring National Park, West Coast Region
Grainger Falls		Fiordland National Park, Southland Region
Haruru Falls	6 metres (20 ft)	Northland Region
Helena Falls	50 metres (160 ft)	Fiordland National Park, Southland Region
Huka Falls	11 metres (36 ft)	Waikato River, Waikato Region
Humboldt Falls	275 metres (902 ft)	Fiordland National Park, Southland Region
Hunua Falls	30 metres (98 ft)	Auckland Region
Karekare Falls	30 metres (98 ft)	Auckland Region
Kitekite Falls	40 metres (130 ft)	Auckland Region
Lady Alice Falls	200 metres (660 ft) - 280 metres (920 ft)	Fiordland National Park, Southland Region
Lake Unknown Falls	680 metres (2,230 ft)	Fiordland National Park, Southland Region
Madonna Falls	5 metres (16 ft)	Waikato Region
Maraetotara Falls	16 metres (52 ft)	Hawke's Bay Region
Marokopa Falls	35 metres (115 ft)	Waikato Region
Maruia Falls		West Coast Region
Mauku Falls	5 metres (16 ft)	Auckland Region
McLean Falls	22 metres (72 ft)	The Catlins, Otago Region
Mōkau Falls	37 metres (121 ft)	Te Urewera National Park, Hawke's Bay Region
Mount Damper Falls	74 metres (243 ft)	Taranaki Region
Okere Falls	5 metres (16 ft)	Bay of Plenty Region
Omaru Falls	45 metres (148 ft)	Waikato Region
Owharoa Falls	6 metres (20 ft)	Waikato Region
Palisade Falls	55 metres (180 ft)	Fiordland, Southland Region
Purakaunui Falls	20 metres (66 ft)	The Catlins, Otago Region
Rainbow Falls (Waianiwaniwa)	27 metres (89 ft)	Northland Region
Roaring Billy Falls	30 metres (98 ft)	Mount Aspiring National Park, West Coast Region
School Creek Falls (Ross Creek Falls)	20 metres (66 ft)	Dunedin, Otago Region
Stirling Falls	151 metres (495 ft)	Fiordland National Park, Southland Region
Sutherland Falls	580 metres (1,900 ft)	Fiordland National Park, Southland Region
Tarawera Falls	35 metres (115 ft)	Bay of Plenty Region
Te Rere I Oturu Falls	40 metres (130 ft)	Kaimai Ranges, Bay of Plenty Region
Te Rere o Kapuni		Taranaki Region
Terror Falls	740 metres (2,430 ft)	Fiordland National Park, Southland Region
Thunder Creek Falls	28 metres (92 ft)	Mount Aspiring National Park, West Coast Region
Wainui Falls	20 metres (66 ft)	Wainui Bay, Tasman Region
Wairere Falls	153 metres (502 ft)	Kaimai Ranges, Waikato Region
Waitakere Falls	95 metres (312 ft)	Auckland Region
Whangārei Falls	26 metres (85 ft)	Northland Region

== Fiordland ==
Many of the highest New Zealand waterfalls are in Fiordland National Park in the Southland region of the South Island, and are geographically on the west coast; an area with very high rainfall. Several of the waterfalls empty into fiords off the Tasman Sea:

falls into Doubtful Sound - Chamberlain Falls, Helena Falls, Lady Alice Falls.
falls into Milford Sound - Bowen Falls, Stirling Falls.

== See also ==
- Water in New Zealand
- List of waterfalls
