= Deep Cove (New Zealand) =

Cove in New Zealand

- Taipaririki (Māori)
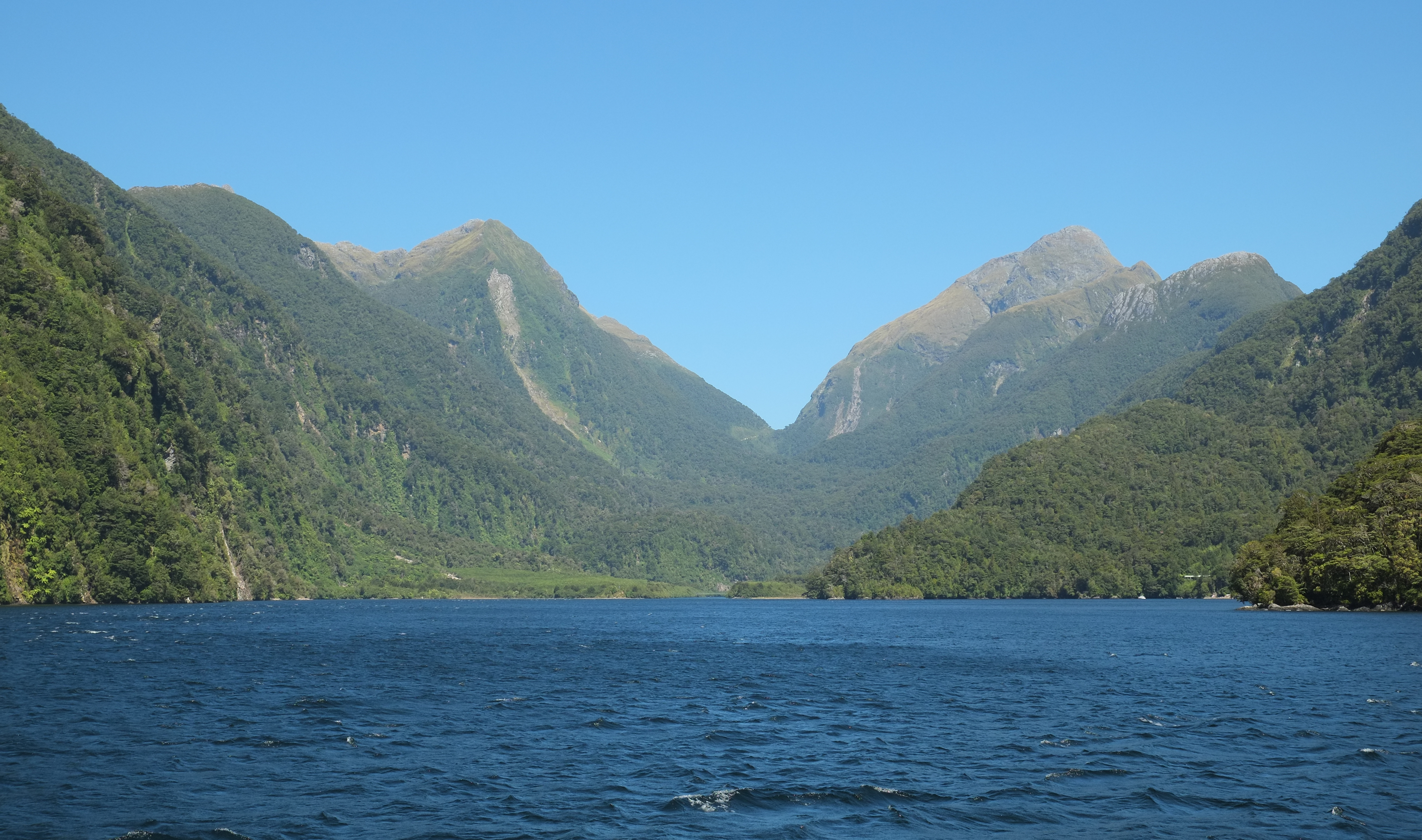
- Deep Cove, with Wilmot Pass behind

- Location in New Zealand
- Interactive map of Deep Cove
- Location: Tasman Sea
- Coordinates: 45°27′S 167°09′E
- River sources: Lyvia River
- Basin countries: New Zealand
- Max. length: 4 km (2.5 mi)
- Max. width: 500 m (1,600 ft)
- Surface area: 1 km (0.62 mi)
- Settlements: Deep Cove hostel

Deep Cove (Māori: Taipaririki) is an arm of Doubtful Sound, a deep indentation in the southwest coast of New Zealand's South Island. Along with the Hall Arm, which lies to the southwest of Deep Cove, it forms one of the two most remote parts of the sound from the Tasman Sea, with its mouth being 32 kilometres (20 mi) from the mouth of Doubtful Sound. Elizabeth Island lies close to the junction of Deep Cove and the Hall Arm. Deep Cove by itself is about four kilometres long and is home to several waterfalls, including Helena Falls and Lady Alice Falls.

== Geography ==
Until the 1960s, Deep Cove was only accessible from the sea or via the Wilmot Pass walking track. In 1964, however, the cove saw the start of considerable activity as it became an important part of the Manapouri Hydroelectricity Project as the site of the tailrace tunnel from Lake Manapouri. A 10 kilometres (6.2 mi) tunnel connects the cove with the lake. The tunnel was completed in late 1969, with the power station became operational the following year. A second tunnel was started in 1997 and became operational in 2002.

The discharge of clear fresh water has affected fauna and flora by letting light into the lower layers of the sound. Nevertheless, this is an area naturally high in fresh water inflows (7.6 metres of rain falls annually). In the 1980s an application was made to extract and ship the water overseas but the project did not proceed.

The strong salinity stratification generated by the freshwater layer has been the focus of a number of oceanographic expeditions using the cove as a natural laboratory. The research found that the riverine nature of the inflow gradually dissipated over a few km but that the underside of the freshwater plume sustains some of the sharpest stratification ever observed. The measurements detected internal wave motion both from the nearby river inlet and from the ocean 40 km away.

Today, Deep Cove serves as the starting point for Doubtful Sound cruises on tour boats stationed at a small wharf in Wanganella Cove, within Deep Cove. The full-day tours depart from Manapouri by boat to travel across Lake Manapouri, followed by a bus ride over Wilmot Pass, and return the same way after the boat tour in Doubtful Sound. The wharf in Deep Cove is also used for unloading large components such as transformers from barges, to be delivered to the Manapouri Power Station via Wilmot Pass, as there is no other road access to the power plant and these components would be too large to ferry across Lake Manapouri from the other side.

== Vegetation and wildlife ==
The wildlife in this area include dolphins and birds. Introduced species include mice, rats and hare. The Deep Cove watershed is heavily forested with Nothofagus (beech) trees, a large variety of understory shrubs and ferns being present.
