= Owharoa Falls =

Waterfall in Waikato, New Zealand

Coordinates: 37°25′11″S 175°45′50″E

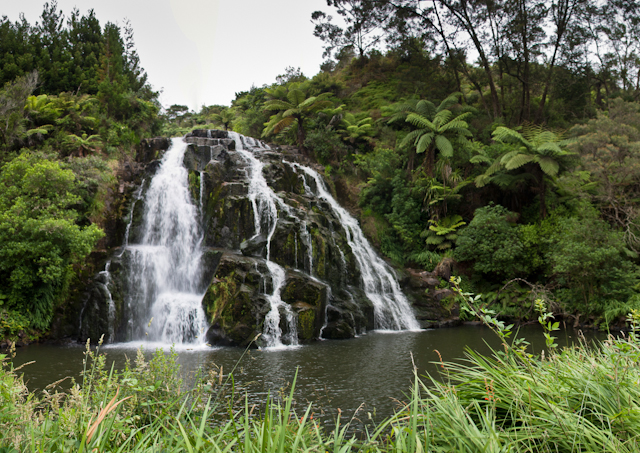
Owharoa Falls 2010

Owharoa Falls is a staircase waterfall in Waikato, New Zealand, located off Waitawheta Road in Karangahake Gorge, near State Highway 2, between Paeroa and Waihi, and close to the small settlement of Waikino.

== See also ==
- List of waterfalls
- List of waterfalls in New Zealand
