= Te Rere o Kapuni =

Waterfall in Taranaki, New Zealand

Coordinates: 39°19′31.19″S 174°6′26.01″E

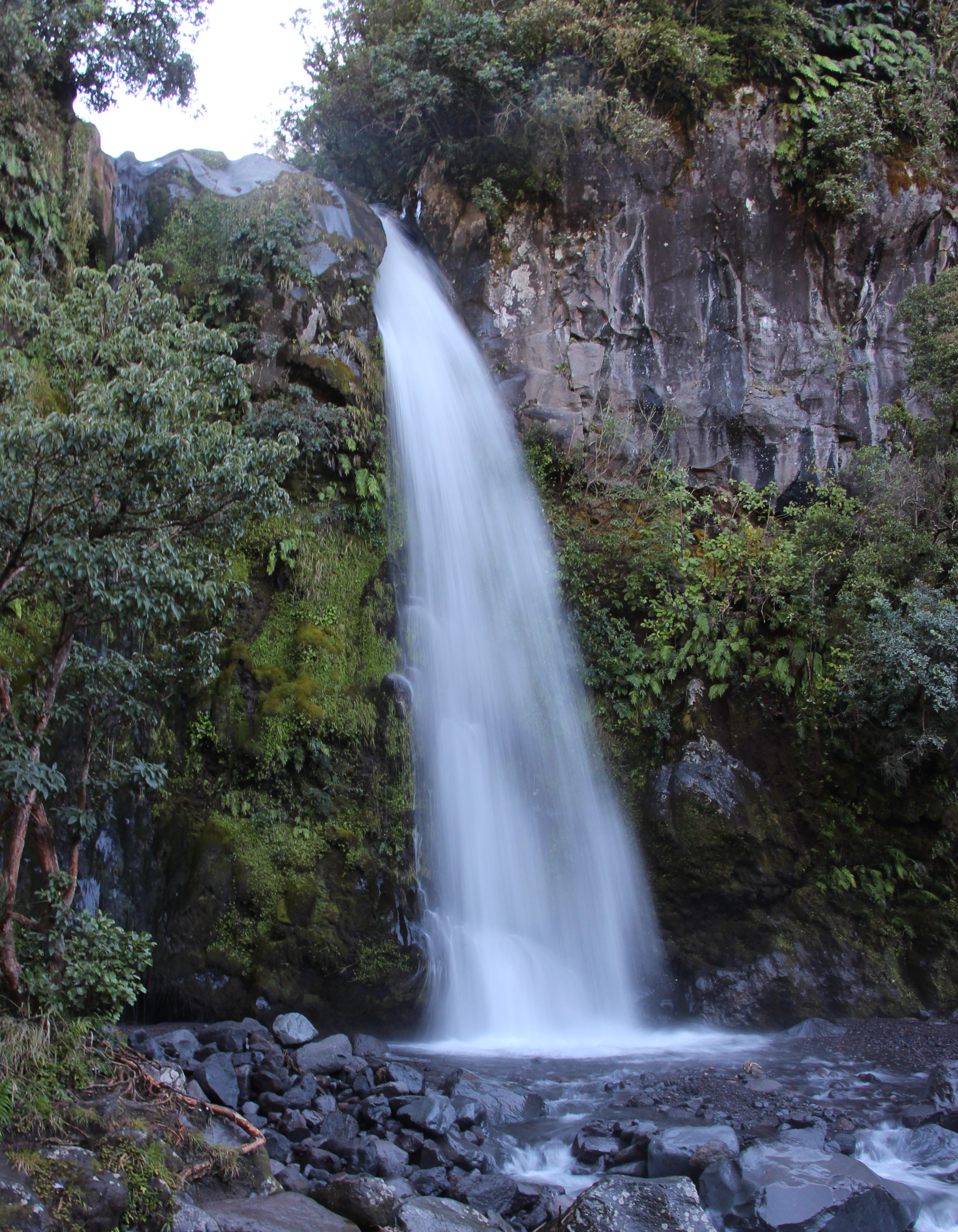
Te Rere o Kapuni / Dawson Falls in 2016

Te Rere o Kapuni, also known as Dawson Falls, is a waterfall in the Taranaki region of New Zealand. Located at the base of Mount Taranaki, the waterfall is said to be the place where the Māori prophet Tahupotiki Wiremu Ratana received and revived his healing powers, and is considered sacred by Māori in the Ratana Church.

In 2006, the waterfall crumbled and is now half its original size. Members of the Ratana Church and movement regard this as a divine sign from Jehovah concerning the church and its future.

== See also ==
- List of waterfalls
- List of waterfalls in New Zealand
