= Madonna Falls =

Coordinates: 38°29′58.74″S 175°11′26.65″E

The Madonna Falls, is a waterfall believed to hold mana and have healing properties. The waterfall is located close to State Highway 4 about 14 kilometres (8.7 mi) from the town of Mapiu.

== See also ==
- List of waterfalls
- List of waterfalls in New Zealand
