= Lady Alice Falls =

Coordinates: 45°26′42″S 167°9′6.6″E

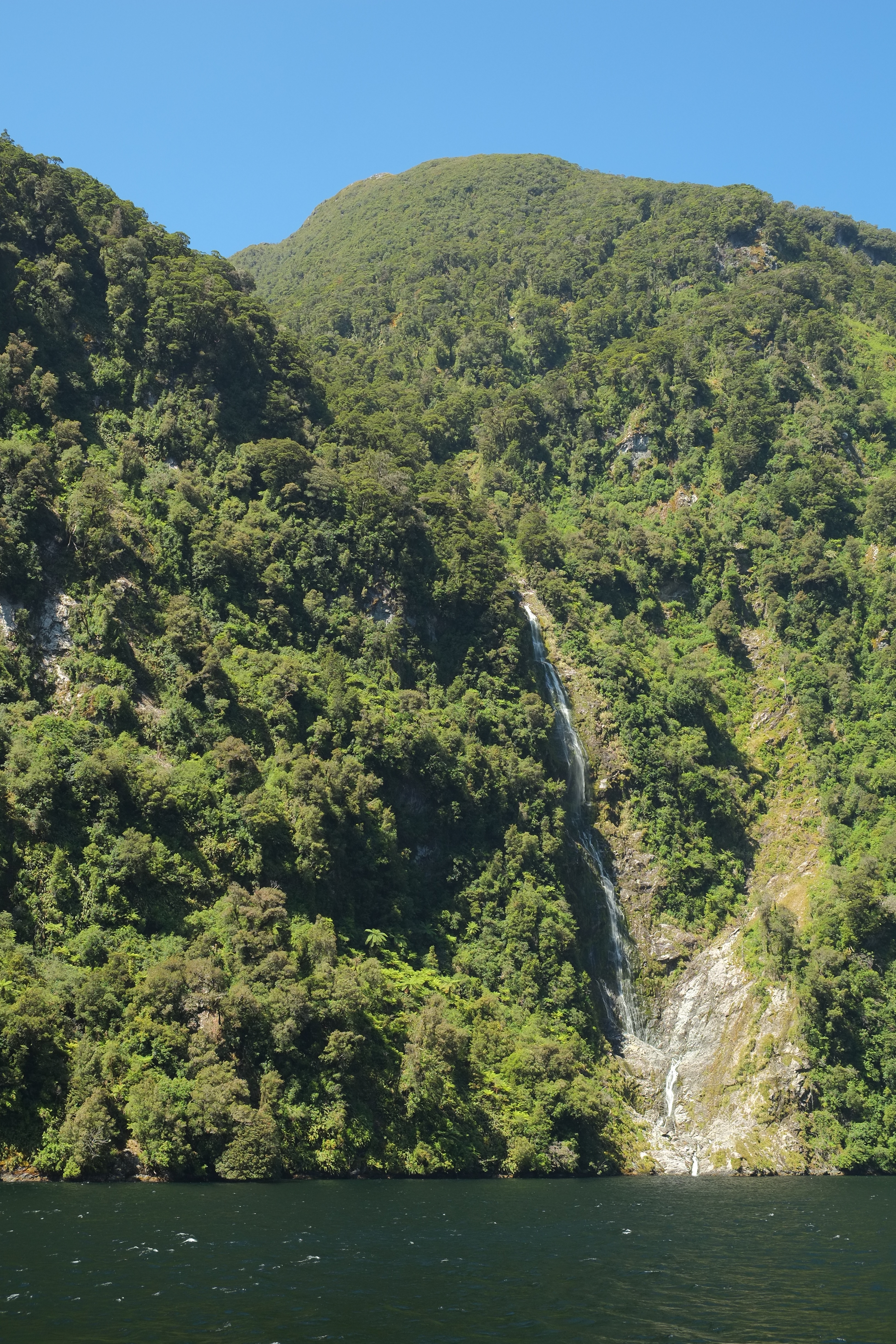
- Lady Alice Falls in summer with very low water flow
- Interactive map of Lady Alice Falls
- Location: Doubtful Sound, New Zealand
- Type: Horsetail
- Total height: 656 or 919 ft (200 or 280 m)
- Number of drops: 1
- World height ranking: 279

Lady Alice Falls is a tall waterfall in Fiordland, New Zealand. It drops either 656 or 919 feet (200 or 280 m). The falls are formed by a mountain stream dropping out of a hanging valley down to Doubtful Sound, one kilometre inside Deep Cove.

The falls should not be confused with the Alice Falls, further north in Fiordland, which flow into George Sound.

== See also ==
- List of waterfalls
- List of waterfalls in New Zealand
