= Lyvia River =

- Route of the Lyvia River
- Mouth of the Lyvia River Lyvia River (South Island)

Location
- Country: New Zealand

Physical characteristics
- Source
  - coordinates: 45°31′09″S 167°05′02″E
- Mouth
  - location: Wanganella Cove
  - coordinates: 45°28′16″S 167°09′47″E

Basin features
- Progression: Lyvia River → Wanganella Cove → Deep Cove → Doubtful Sound / Patea → Tasman Sea
- Tributaries
  - right: Stella Burn
- Waterfalls: Lyvia River Cascades

The Lyvia River is a river of Fiordland, New Zealand. It rises in the Dingwall Mountains and flows north-eastward into Doubtful Sound / Patea at Wanganella Cove, a cove within Deep Cove.

== See also ==
- List of rivers of New Zealand
