= Mōkau Falls =

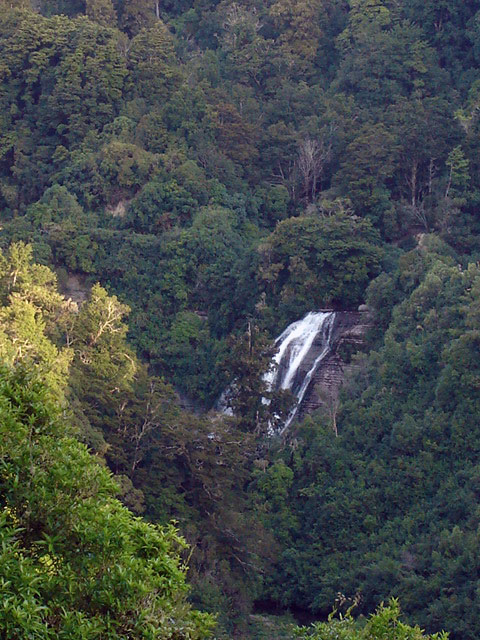
- Mōkau Falls
- Interactive map of Mōkau Falls
- Location: Hawkes Bay, New Zealand
- Coordinates: 38.731255°S 177.097292°E
- Type: Horsetail
- Watercourse: Mokau Stream

Mōkau Falls is a cascade located at the head of Mōkau Inlet in New Zealand's Lake Waikaremoana.

== See also ==
- List of waterfalls
- New Zealand Waterfalls
