= Karekare Falls =

Waterfall in the Auckland Region, New Zealand

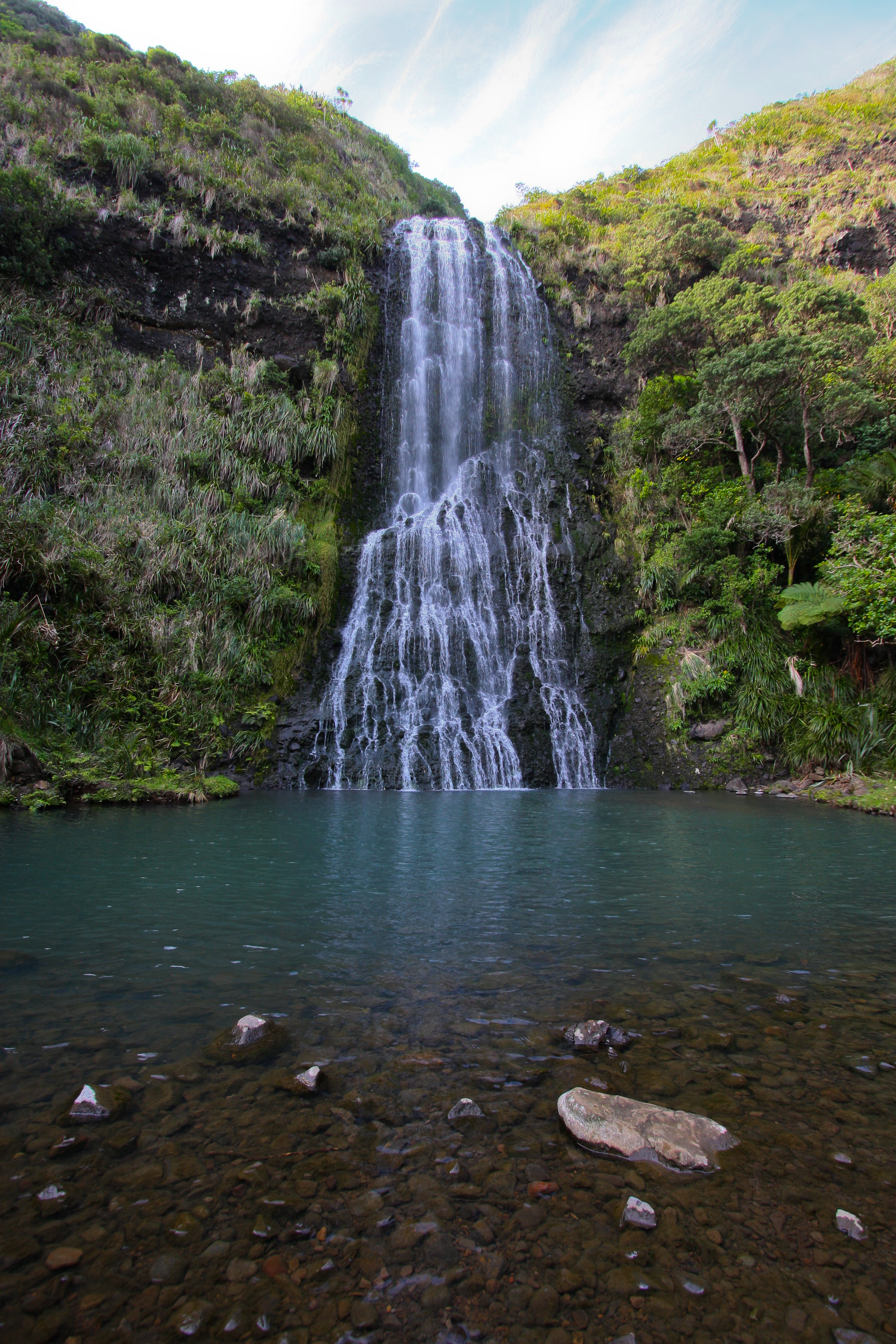
- The Karekare Falls in 2008
- Interactive map of Karekare Falls
- Location: Karekare, Waitākere Ranges
- Coordinates: 36°59′09″S 174°28′57″E
- Total height: 30 metres (98 ft)
- Watercourse: Company Stream

The Karekare Falls is a waterfall in the western Waitākere Ranges of the Auckland Region, New Zealand.

== Geography ==
The Karekare Falls are a part of the Company Stream, a tributary of the Karekare Stream. The waterfall is 30 m (98 ft) high. The waterfall is accessible by a walking track from Karekare Road, which takes a 10-minute walk.

The waterfall is bordered by pōhutukawa trees and nīkau palms.

== History ==
While falls are often referred to by the Māori language name Te Rere, they are traditionally known to Te Kawerau ā Maki as Te Ahoaho, a name that likens the waterfall to white fibres of muka flax.

== Art and popular culture ==
Karekare Falls has been depicted in art by Stanley Palmer. The waterfalls were used as a filming location for the television series Hercules: The Legendary Journeys and Xena: Warrior Princess, including a prominent scene in the 1997 episode of Xena: Warrior Princess, The Furies.

== Recreation ==
The Karekare Falls is located near the start of the Taraire Tramping Track.

== See also ==
- List of waterfalls
- List of waterfalls in New Zealand
