= Humboldt Falls =

Coordinates: 44.6972632°S 168.1350245°E

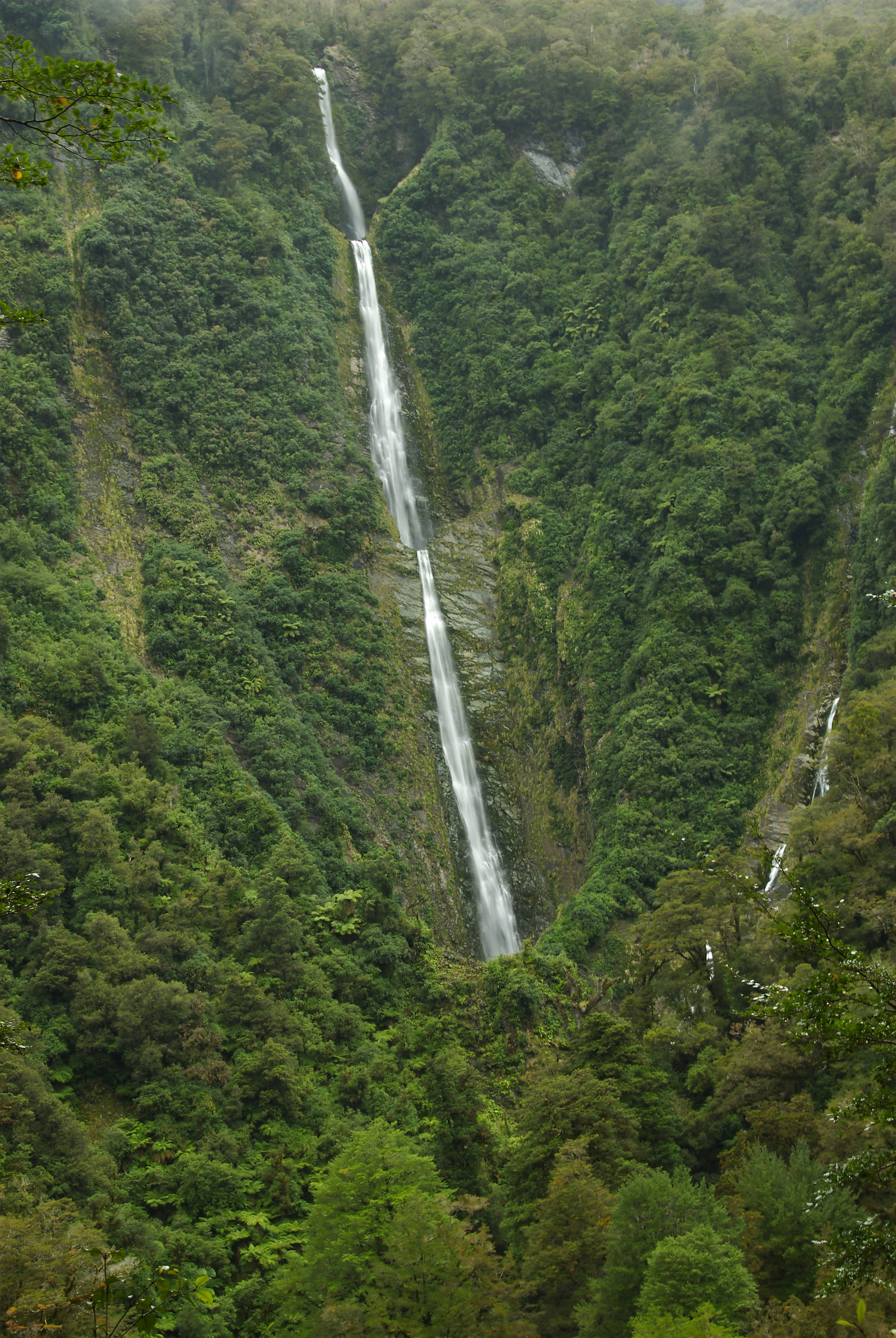
- Humboldt Falls
- Interactive map of Humboldt Falls
- Location: Fiordland, New Zealand
- Type: Horsetail
- Total height: 275 metres (902 ft)
- Watercourse: Humboldt Creek

Humboldt Falls is a waterfall located in the Hollyford Valley in the Fiordland district of New Zealand. They fall 275 metres in three drops; the largest of the three drops is 134 metres high.

== Directions ==
The track to Humboldt Falls begins from Hollyford Road. In order to get to Hollyford Road, turn from the Milford Road. The trail back from the falls is about half an hour while it is 600 m long. The track is graded well and allows someone to climb easily in order to get a good view from the falls.

== See also ==
- List of waterfalls
- List of waterfalls in New Zealand
