= Namu River =

- Route of the Namu River
- Mouth of the Namu River Namu River (South Island)

Location
- Country: New Zealand

Physical characteristics
- Source
  - coordinates: 45°11′46″S 167°03′39″E
- Mouth
  - location: Te Awa-o-Tū / Thompson Sound
  - coordinates: 45°10′03″S 166°59′37″E

Basin features
- Progression: Namu River → Open Cove → Te Awa-o-Tū / Thompson Sound → Tasman Sea

The Namu River is a river in Fiordland, New Zealand. It rises north of Mount Namu and flows westward into Open Cove, Te Awa-o-Tū / Thompson Sound.

== See also ==
- List of rivers of New Zealand
