= Pandora River =

River in Fiordland, New Zealand

- Route of the Pandora River
- Mouth of the Pandora River Pandora River (South Island)

Location
- Country: New Zealand

Physical characteristics
- Source
  - coordinates: 45°13′14″S 167°03′35″E
- Mouth
  - location: Te Awa-o-Tū / Thompson Sound
  - coordinates: 45°10′24″S 166°59′11″E

Basin features
- Progression: Pandora River → Te Awa-o-Tū / Thompson Sound → Tasman Sea

The Pandora River is a river in Fiordland, New Zealand. It rises south of Mount Namu and flows north-westward into Te Awa-o-Tū / Thompson Sound.

== See also ==
- List of rivers of New Zealand
