= Misty River =

- Route of the Misty River
- Mouth of the Misty River Misty River (South Island) Misty River (Fiordland)

Location
- Country: New Zealand

Physical characteristics
- Source
  - coordinates: 45°12′40″S 167°15′48″E
- Mouth
  - location: Kaikiekie / Bradshaw Sound
  - coordinates: 45°14′52″S 167°10′09″E

Basin features
- Progression: Misty River → Kaikiekie / Bradshaw Sound → Tasman Sea
- Tributaries
  - right: Rea River
- Waterbodies: Teardrop Lake

The Misty River is a river in Fiordland, New Zealand. It rises to the east of Irene Pass and flows westward into Teardrop Lake and on to Kaikiekie / Bradshaw Sound.

== See also ==
- List of rivers of New Zealand
