= Camelot River =

- Route of the Camelot River
- Mouth of the Camelot River Camelot River (South Island) Camelot River (Fiordland)

Location
- Country: New Zealand

Physical characteristics
- Source: Confluence of Elaine Stream and Cozette Burn
  - location: Bedivere Falls
  - coordinates: 45°18′26″S 167°16′11″E
- Mouth
  - location: Shoal Cove, Kaikiekie / Bradshaw Sound
  - coordinates: 45°18′46″S 167°11′41″E
- Length: 5 km (3 mi)

Basin features
- Progression: Camelot River → Shoal Cove → Kaikiekie / Bradshaw Sound → Tasman Sea

The Camelot River is a river of Fiordland National Park, New Zealand. It is formed from the confluence of the Elaine Stream and Cozette Burn and flows west into the Gaer Arm of Kaikiekie / Bradshaw Sound. The estuary is protected by the Kutu Parera (Gaer Arm) Marine Reserve.

== See also ==
- List of rivers of New Zealand
