= Ananui Falls =

Waterfall in Waikato Region, New Zealand

- Interactive map of Ananui Falls
- Coordinates: 37.409°S 175.834°E
- Type: Horsetail
- Total height: 106 m (348 ft)

Ananui Falls is a waterfall located just south of the town of Waihi in New Zealand's Waikato Region.

== See also ==
- List of waterfalls
- List of waterfalls in New Zealand
