= Wairere Falls =

Waterfall in Waikato, New Zealand

Coordinates: 37.734°S 175.88°E

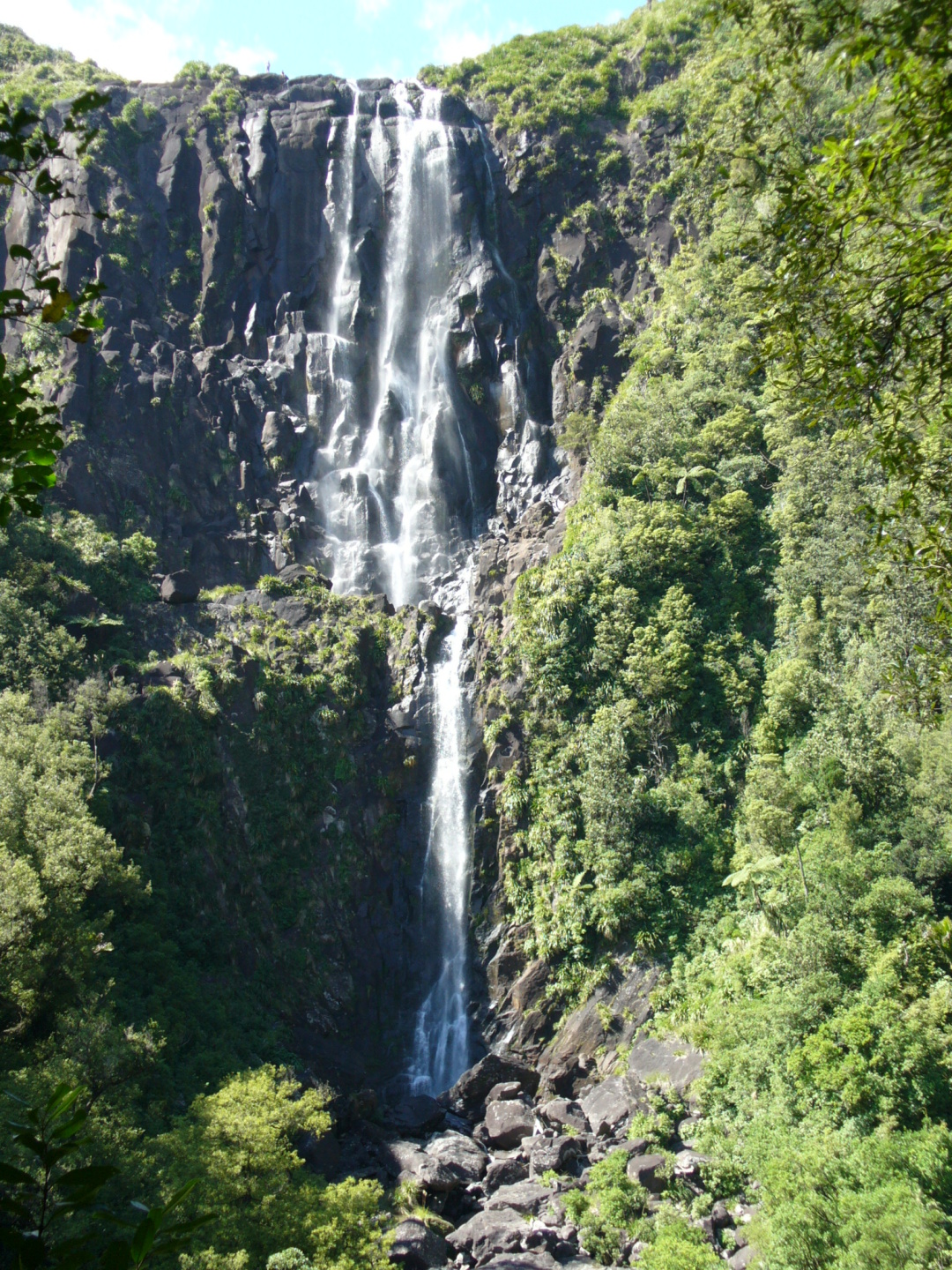
- Wairere Falls from the viewing platform
- Interactive map of Wairere Falls
- Location: Waikato, New Zealand
- Type: Tiered
- Total height: 153 m (502 ft)
- Watercourse: Wairere Stream

Wairere Falls, the highest waterfall in New Zealand's North Island, plunges 153 metres (500 feet) in two steps over the Kaimai escarpment.

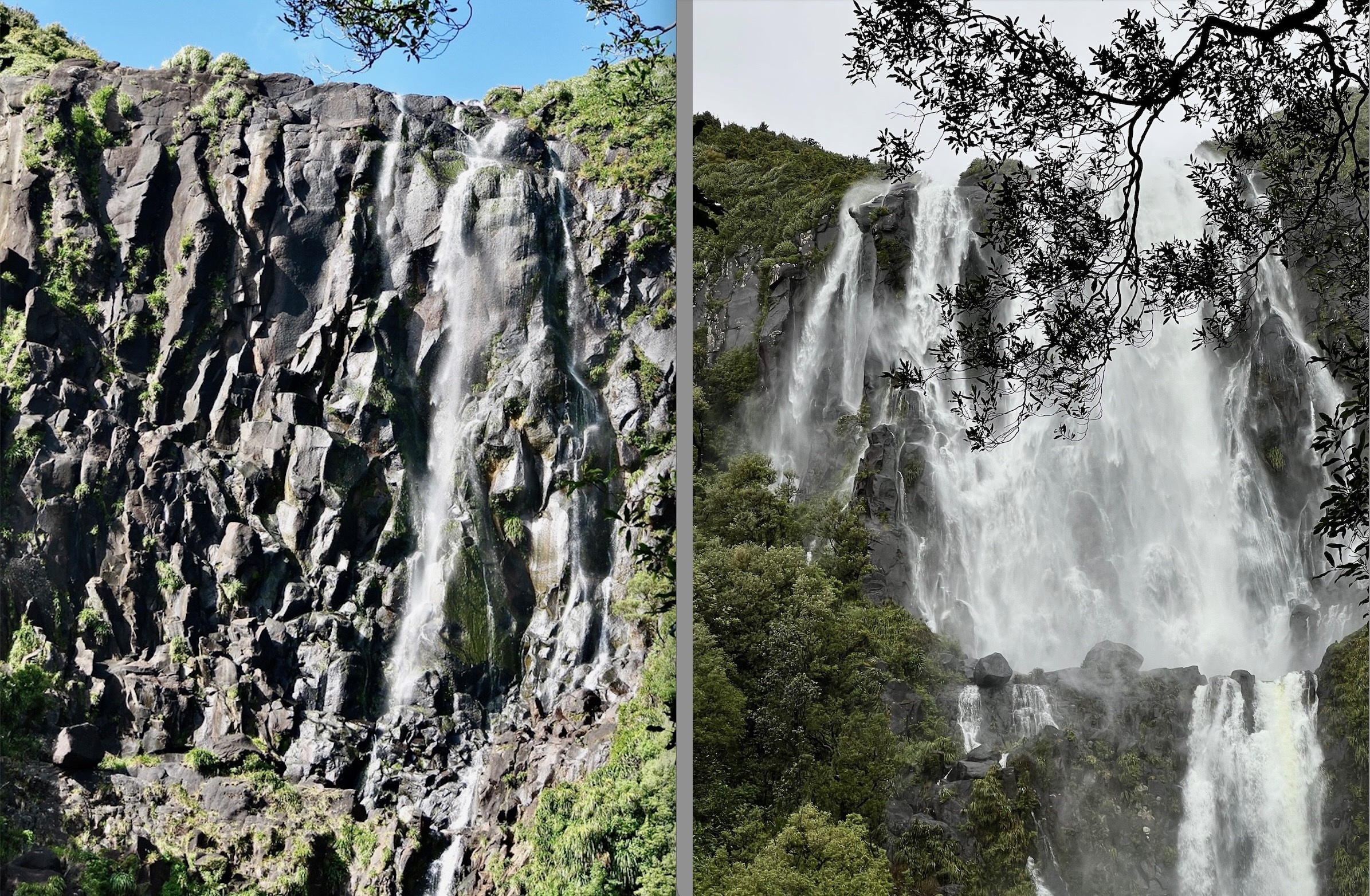
Wairere Falls in April 2010 (upper lookout to right) and May 2023 (after heavy rain) from the lower lookout

The waterfall is located between Te Aroha and Matamata. A walking track runs from the car park at the end of Goodwin Road, up the valley of the stream to a viewing platform, and thence to the top of the plateau and the crest of the falls. The track is about 5 km (3.1 mi) return to the lower lookout and climbs about 380 m (1,250 ft) from Goodwin Road to the top of the falls. Once at the top one can continue onto the North South track that runs the length of the Kaimai Ranges.

The Wairere Falls receives around 60,000 visitors each year. In 2017, the farmer who owned land close to the falls closed off a paddock to stock and constructed a seat for visitors that he dubbed "The international seat of peace".

A road from Te Aroha to the falls was built between 1886 and 1892, when a coach service was started. It was extended about 1915. In 1903 the falls were considered for hydro power, but were protected by declaration as a Scenic Reserve on 12 November 1908.

The Kaimai Range's western boundary is the Hauraki Fault. This part of the Range is formed of Waiteariki Formation, a crystal-rich, welded, dacite ignimbrite. The rock was erupted about 2.1m years ago.

Ngāti Hinerangi value Te Wairere Falls as in Māori mythology it is the place where an early explorer, Ngahue, killed a moa, to use for food on his voyage back to Hawaiki. They used the Wairere track during the 1864 Tauranga campaign. In July 1896 the Native Land Court gave ownership of the falls to the Crown.

== See also ==
- List of waterfalls
- List of waterfalls in New Zealand
