= Helena Falls =

- Location within New Zealand
- Location: New Zealand
- Coordinates: 45°27′49″S 167°10′02″E
- Type: Multi-step

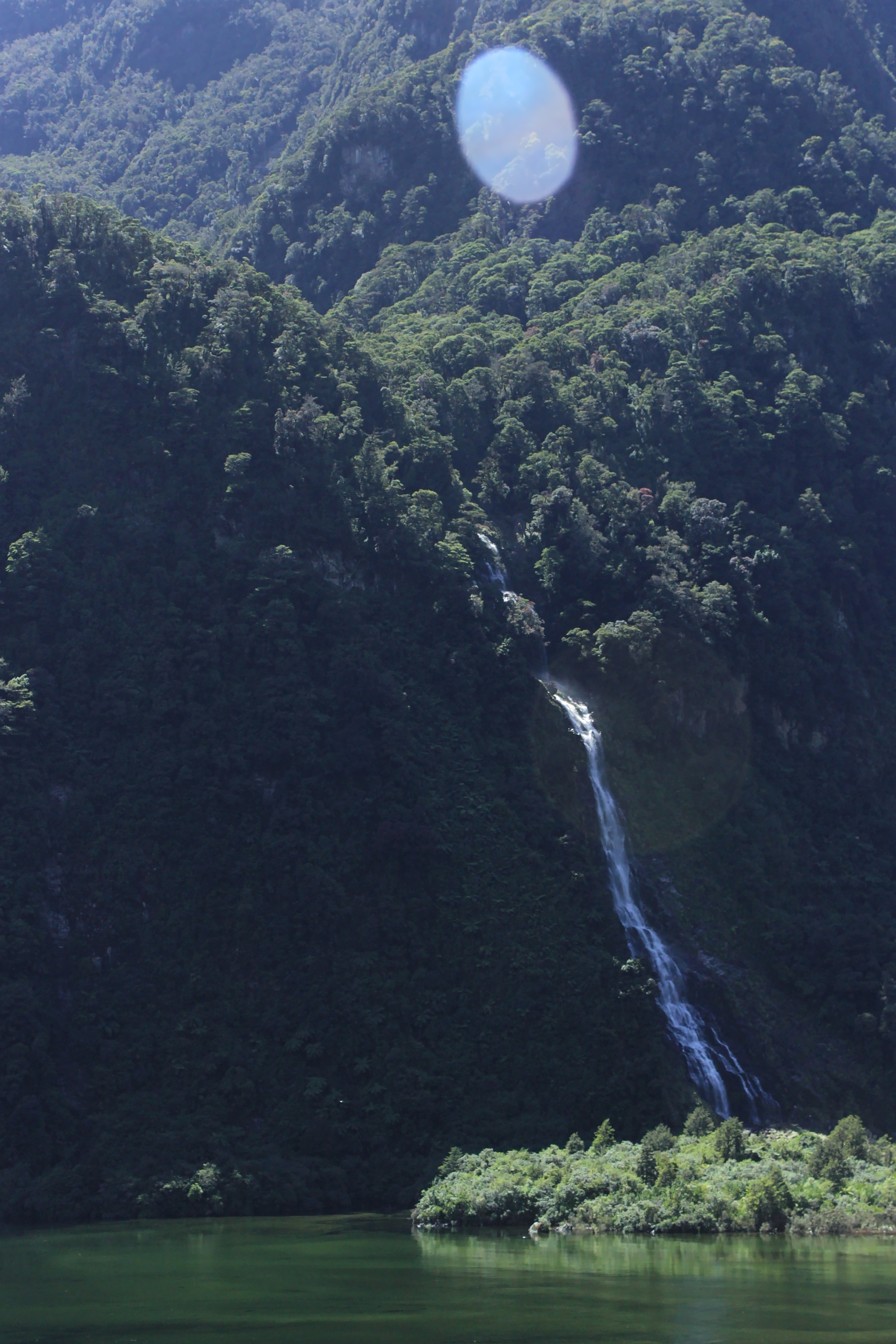

Helena Falls is a waterfall in the Fiordland National Park in New Zealand that empties into Doubtful Sound. A walking track from the road end at Doubtful Sound goes to the base of the waterfall. They are named after Helene Fels (1882–1914), the mother of the poet Charles Brasch.

== See also ==
- List of waterfalls
- Waterfalls of New Zealand
