= Bradshaw Sound =

New Zealand fiord

Kaikiekie / Bradshaw Sound
- Kaikiekie (Māori)
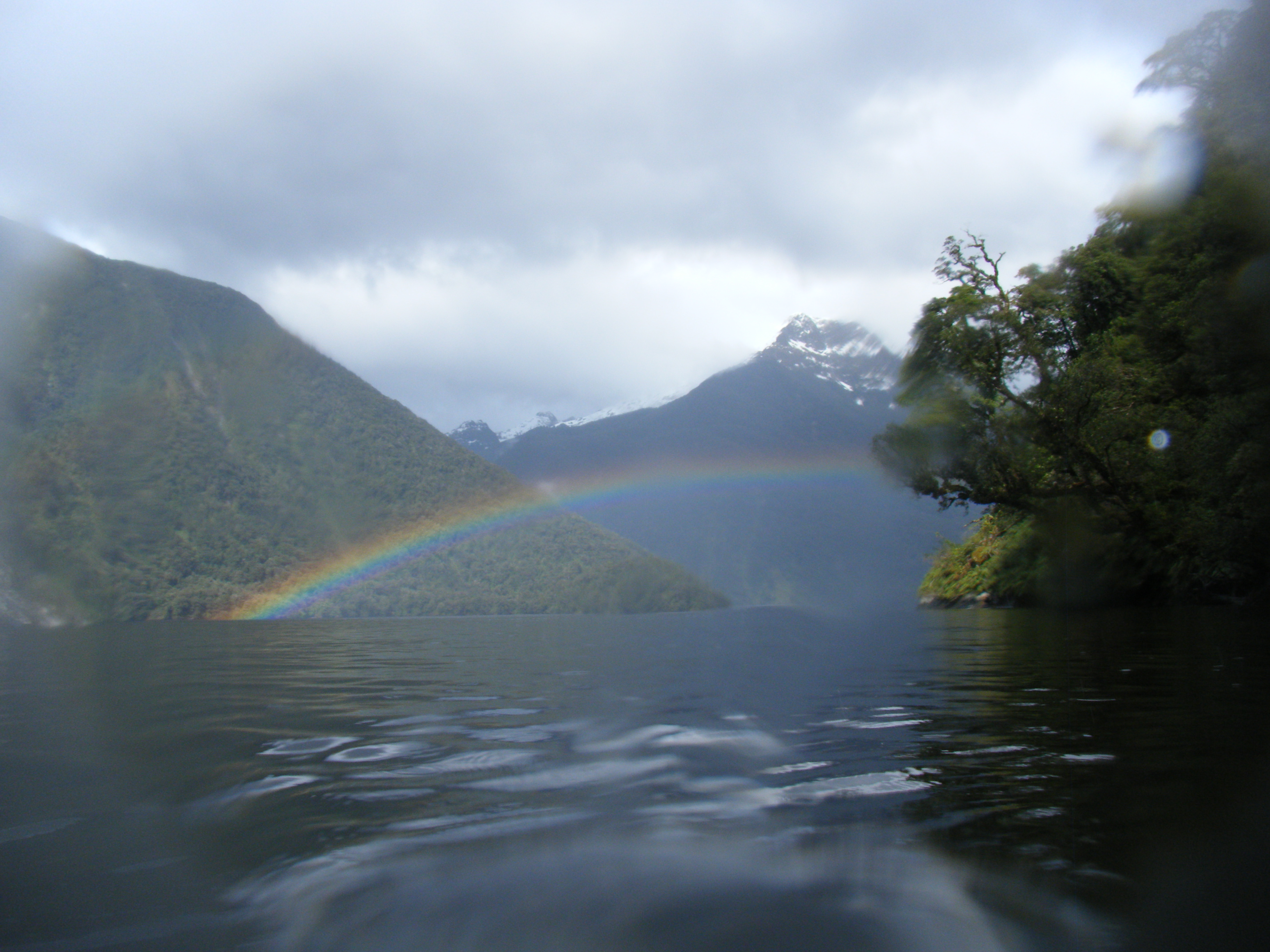
- Bradshaw Sound from the east as seen at water level from the dive site "Garden Jules".

- Location in New Zealand Kaikiekie / Bradshaw Sound (New Zealand)
- Interactive map of Kaikiekie / Bradshaw Sound
- Location: Tasman Sea
- Coordinates: 45.2818°S 167.1010°E
- River sources: Camelot River, Misty River, Rum River
- Basin countries: New Zealand
- Max. width: 1 km (0.62 mi)

Kaikiekie / Bradshaw Sound is one of the larger New Zealand fiords. It is one of the sub fiords/arms that make up the Doubtful Sound/Thompson Sound complex and forms the northernmost of the blind or dead end fiords in this system.

== History ==
It was named by Captain Stokes of HMS Acheron, who gifted the name to R. Bradshaw, his first mate. The Māori call the fiord Kaikiekie, which translates as “to eat kiekie”, the kiekie being a native climbing plant. In October 2019, the name of the fiord was officially altered to Kaikiekie / Bradshaw Sound.

== Geography ==
At the upper reaches of the sound, it sub divides into two smaller arms. To the north is the short Precipice Cove, and to the south the longer Kutu Parera (Gaer Arm).

The northern inlet Precipice Cove is guarded at its southern entrance by Macdonell Island. It offers sheltered anchorage from the prevailing westerly and as such Several small tour companies ( such as Fiordland Expeditions and Real Journeys) use this as a good overnight location to moor. The Misty River flows into the cove.

The southern Kutu Parera (Gaer Arm) is a marine reserve and the rules to protect the environment are tougher here than the rest of Bradshaw Sound. The Camelot River flows into this southern arm.

Like the rest of the fiord system, these areas are a haven for wildlife such as bottlenose dolphins, penguins and the rare black coral and both of the arms at Bradshaw's terminus offer great opportunities to explore the water by kayak or the chance to dive in locations such as the shallow dive site Garden Jules.

Access by land is limited and this area is best explored using boats out of Deep Cove.
