= Thompson Sound (New Zealand) =

Fiord of the South Island of New Zealand

Te Awa-o-Tū / Thompson Sound
- Te Awa-o-Tū (Māori)
- Location in New Zealand Te Awa-o-Tū / Thompson Sound (New Zealand)
- Interactive map of Te Awa-o-Tū / Thompson Sound
- Location: Fiordland
- Coordinates: 45°15′0″S 167°00′00″E
- Part of: Tasman Sea
- River sources: Pandora River, Namu River
- Basin countries: New Zealand
- Max. length: 21 km (13 mi)
- Max. width: 1 km (0.62 mi)

Thompson Sound (Māori: Te Awa-o-Tū; officially Te Awa-o-Tū / Thompson Sound) is a fiord of the South Island of New Zealand. It is one of the fiords that form the coast of Fiordland.

== Geography ==
The fiord is connected at its farthest extent with Pendulo Reach, part of Doubtful Sound / Patea, and between them Thompson and Doubtful Sounds form the non-Tasman Sea coast of Secretary Island. It is 21 kilometres in length. Kaikiekie / Bradshaw Sound, which extends east from the junction of Doubtful and Thompson Sounds, is geographically and geologically an extension of Thompson Sound. Several small rivers flow into Thompson Sound, among them the Pandora and Namu Rivers.

== History ==
Thompson Sound was given its European name by John Grono, a sealer who worked the Fiordland coast in the early 19th century, after his boat's owner, Andrew Thompson. Grono himself is honoured in the name of the 1196-metre Mount Grono, the highest point on Secretary Island. Later surveyor Captain John Stokes incorrectly thought that the sound had been named after Colonial Secretary Edward Deas Thomson, and named an indentation in the sound's Secretary Island coast as Deas Cove. In October 2019, the name of the fiord was officially altered to Te Awa-o-Tū / Thompson Sound.
