= Dagg Sound =

Narrow fiord in Fiordland, New Zealand

Te Rā / Dagg Sound
- Location in New Zealand Te Rā / Dagg Sound (New Zealand)
- Interactive map of Te Rā / Dagg Sound
- Location: Tasman Sea
- Coordinates: 45.38°S 166.77°E
- Basin countries: New Zealand
- Max. length: 13 km (8.1 mi)
- Max. width: 1 km (0.62 mi)

Te Rā / Dagg Sound is a narrow fiord located in Fiordland, New Zealand. It lies south of Doubtful Sound / Patea and north of Te Puaitaha / Breaksea Sound. Whales frequent the waters out from the entrance of the fiord, close to the edge of the continental shelf where the water depth suddenly drops to thousands of metres.

The fiord is surrounded by steep cliffs and stretches inland for 13 km (8.1 mi). Anchorage Arm branches off to the north of the fiord. At the eastern end of the fiord there is a short 1.5 km (0.93 mi) portage through to Crooked Arm in Doubtful Sound / Patea.

== Naming ==
The fiord was named Dagg Sound after named after the Captain of the whaling boat, Scorpion, who visited it in 1804. In October 2019, the name of the fiord was officially altered to Te Rā / Dagg Sound.
