= Doubtful Sound / Patea =

Fiord in New Zealand

- Patea (Māori)
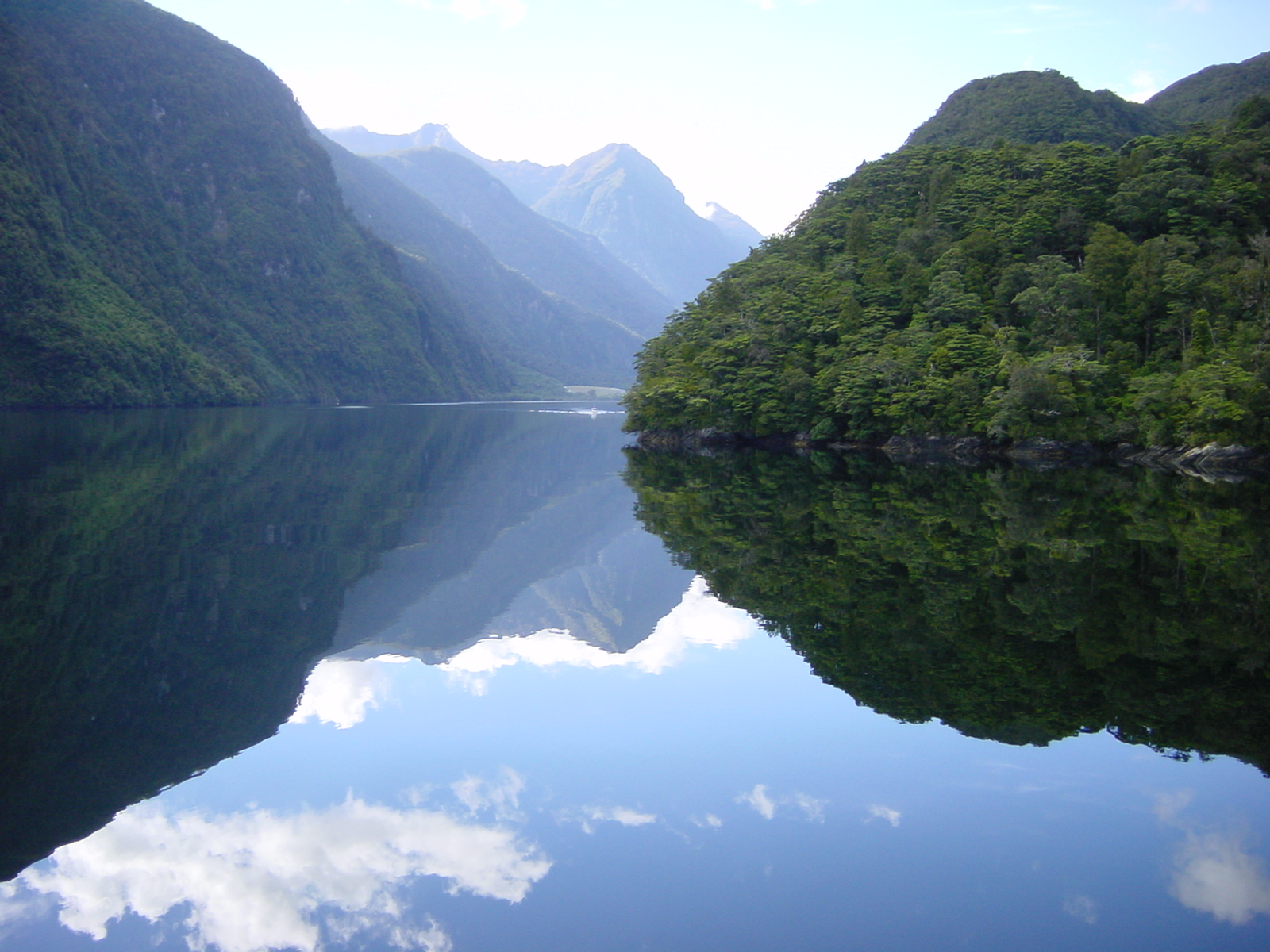
- Doubtful Sound on a clear day

- Location of Doubtful Sound / Patea in New Zealand Doubtful Sound / Patea (New Zealand)
- Location: Fiordland
- Coordinates: 45°19′S 166°59′E
- Part of: Tasman Sea
- River sources: Elizabeth River
- Basin countries: New Zealand
- Max. length: 40 kilometres (25 mi)
- Max. width: 2 kilometres (1.2 mi)
- Islands: Bauza Island, Elizabeth Island

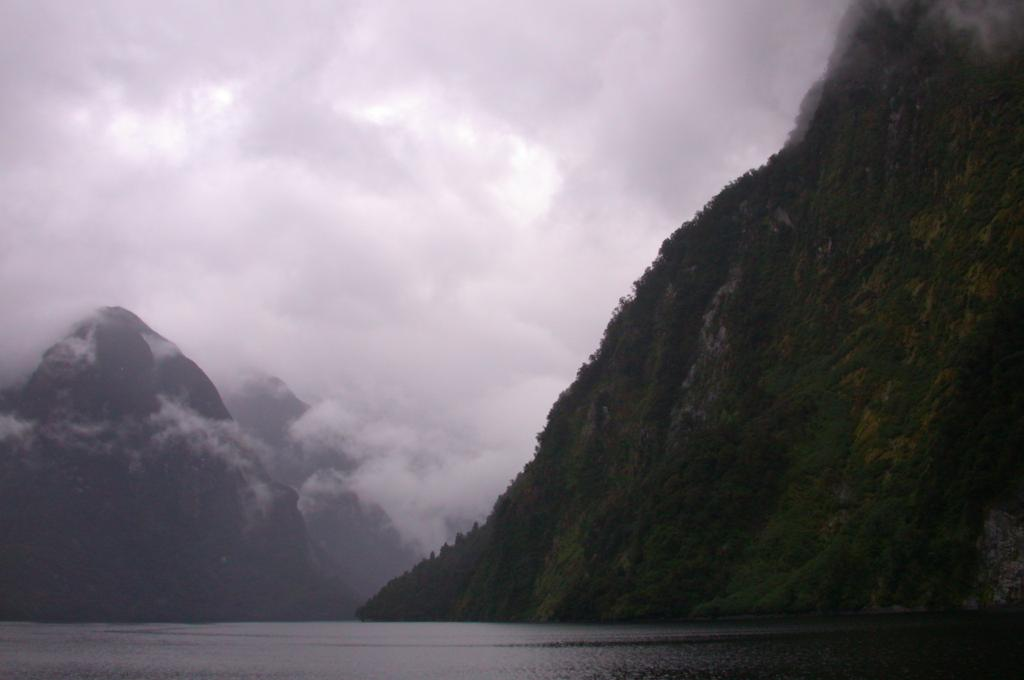
Typical weather in Doubtful Sound

Doubtful Sound / Patea is a fiord in Fiordland, in the far south west of New Zealand. It is located in the same region as the smaller but more famous and accessible Milford Sound / Piopiotahi. It took second place after Milford Sound as New Zealand's most famous tourism destination.

At 40 kilometres (25 mi) long, Doubtful Sound / Patea is the second longest, and with a depth of up to 421 metres (1,381 ft) the deepest of the South Island's fiords. In comparison with Milford Sound, it is more widespread, with the cliffs not as dramatically tall and near vertical. However, the U-shaped profile of the fiord is obvious, in particular on the two innermost of the main fiord's arms and the hanging side valleys along the main fiord.

Like most of Fiordland, Doubtful Sound receives a high amount of rainfall, ranging from an annual average of 3,000–6,000 millimetres (120–240 in). The vegetation on the mountainous landscape surrounding the fiord is dense native rainforest.

== History ==
Doubtful Sound was named 'Doubtful Harbour' in 1770 by Captain Cook, who did not enter the inlet as he was uncertain whether it was navigable under sail. It was later renamed Doubtful Sound by whalers and sealers, although it is not technically a sound but a fiord.

A Spanish scientific expedition commanded by Alessandro Malaspina visited Doubtful Sound in February 1793 to conduct experiments measuring the force of gravity using a pendulum, a part of the effort to establish a new metric system. The officers of the expedition, which included Felipe Bauzá y Cañas, a cartographer, also made the first chart of the entrance and lower parts of the Sound, naming features of it. Today these form a unique cluster containing most of the Spanish names on the map of New Zealand: Febrero Point, Bauza Island and the Nee Islets, Pendulo Reach, and Malaspina Reach.

Following the passage of the Ngāi Tahu Claims Settlement Act 1998, the name of the fiord was officially altered to Doubtful Sound / Patea.

== Geography ==
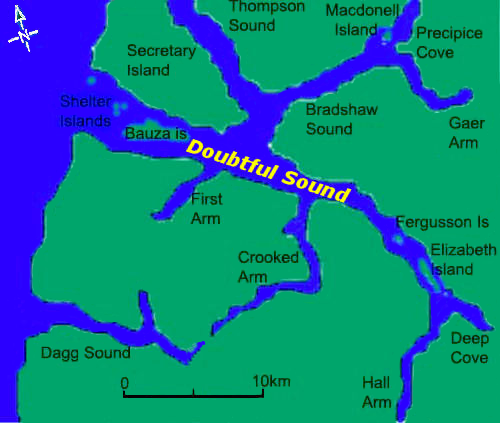
Simple map of the Doubtful Sound complex of fiords and islands

Doubtful Sound lies deep within the Fiordland National Park, about 50 kilometres (31 mi) from the nearest inhabited place, the small town of Manapouri, and is surrounded by mountainous terrain with peaks typically reaching 1,300–1,600 metres (4,300–5,200 ft). Along the coast, there are no settlements for about 200 kilometres (120 mi) in either direction.

There are three distinct arms to the sound, which all extend to the south from the main fiord. From the major conflux of water just south of Secretary Island, these arms are:

1. First Arm, the shortest at 6 kilometres (3.7 mi) long,
2. Crooked Arm, roughly halfway along the sound and the longest at 14 kilometres (8.7 mi) long,
3. Hall Arm (8 kilometres (5.0 mi) long), which branches off from the Sound's terminus at Deep Cove next to the prominent Commander Peak.

Crooked Arm reaches to within 1 kilometre (0.62 mi) of Te Rā / Dagg Sound, almost cutting off a landmass of about 195 square kilometres (75 sq mi).

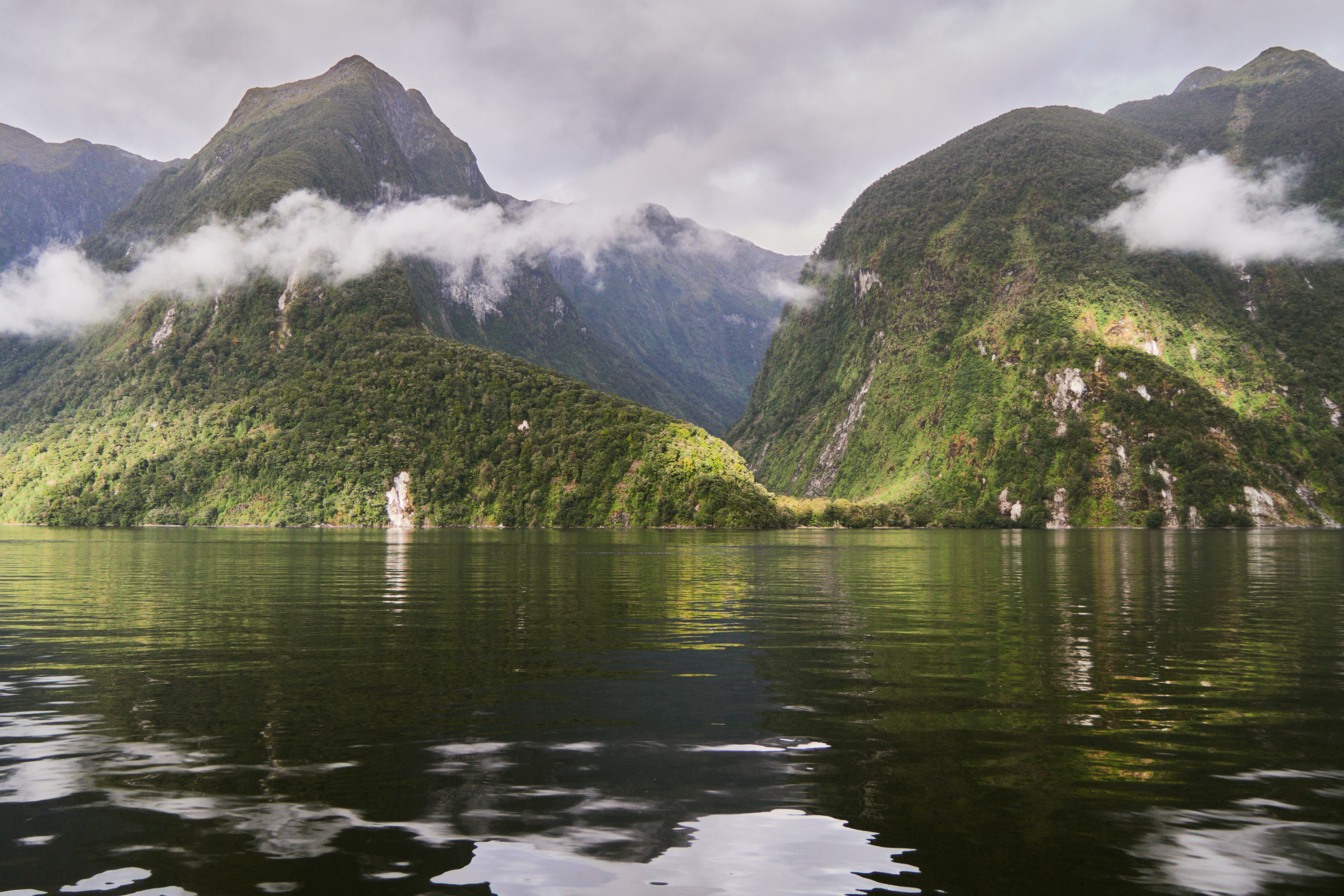
Doubtful Sound fiord on a relatively clear day.

The Sound is the site of several large waterfalls, notably Helena Falls at Deep Cove and the Browne Falls, which have a fall of over 600 metres (2,000 ft). The steep hills surrounding the main fiord and its arms are known for their hundreds of waterfalls during the rainy season.

Doubtful Sound contains about a dozen smaller islands, with the more notable ones being Elizabeth Island, Fergusson Island, Bauza Island, and the Shelter Islands. Parts of the sound on the west side of Elizabeth Island are protected by the Taipari Roa (Elizabeth Island) Marine Reserve.

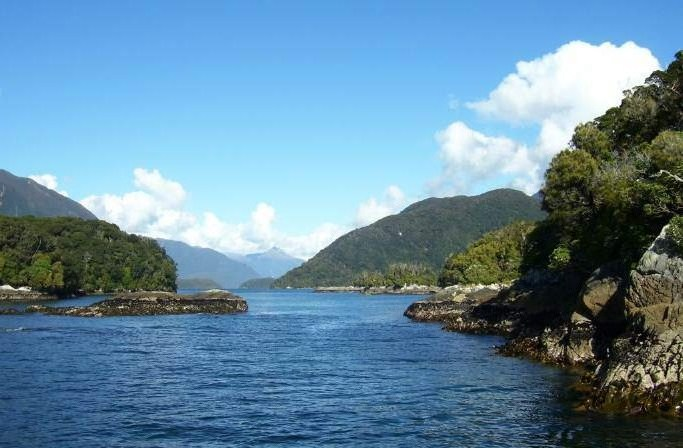
Doubtful Sound's Shelter Islands

The last quarter of the sound closest to the sea is dominated by islands, the major one being Secretary Island to the north. At the southernmost tip of the island, Doubtful Sound opens up as a confluence of 5 bodies of water. From the western seaward end and going clockwise, these are:

1. Seaward end of Doubtful Sound, often referred to as "The Gut"
2. Te Awa-o-Tū / Thompson Sound
3. Kaikiekie / Bradshaw Sound
4. Continuation of Doubtful Sound to Deep Cove (Malaspina Reach)
5. First Arm

The narrow, shallower area of the sound between Bauza Island and Secretary Island ("The Gut") offers more shelter than areas further to the west and towards the sea. It is a popular fishing and mooring location and is a haven for crayfish.

Thompson Sound and Bradshaw Sound join in a short stretch named "Pendulo Reach" southeast of Secretary Island, and containing the tiny Seymour Island.

Access to the sound is either by sea or via the isolated Wilmot Pass road from the Manapouri Power Station. Most areas of the sound itself are accessible only by sea, however, as the road network in this area of New Zealand is sparse or nonexistent, as is the human population.

Charles John Lyttelton, 10th Viscount Cobham, Governor-General of New Zealand (1957–1962) wrote about this part of Fiordland:

"There are just a few areas left in the world where no human has ever set foot. That one of them should be in a country so civilized and so advanced as New Zealand may seem incredible, unless one has visited the south-west corner of the South Island. Jagged razor backed mountains rear their heads into the sky. More than 200 days of rain a year ensure not a tree branch is left bare and brown, moss and epiphytes drape every nook. The forest is intensely green. This is big country... one day peaceful, a study in green and blue, the next melancholy and misty, with low cloud veiling the tops... an awesome place, with its granite precipices, its hanging valleys, its earthquake faults and its thundering cascades."

== Flora and fauna ==
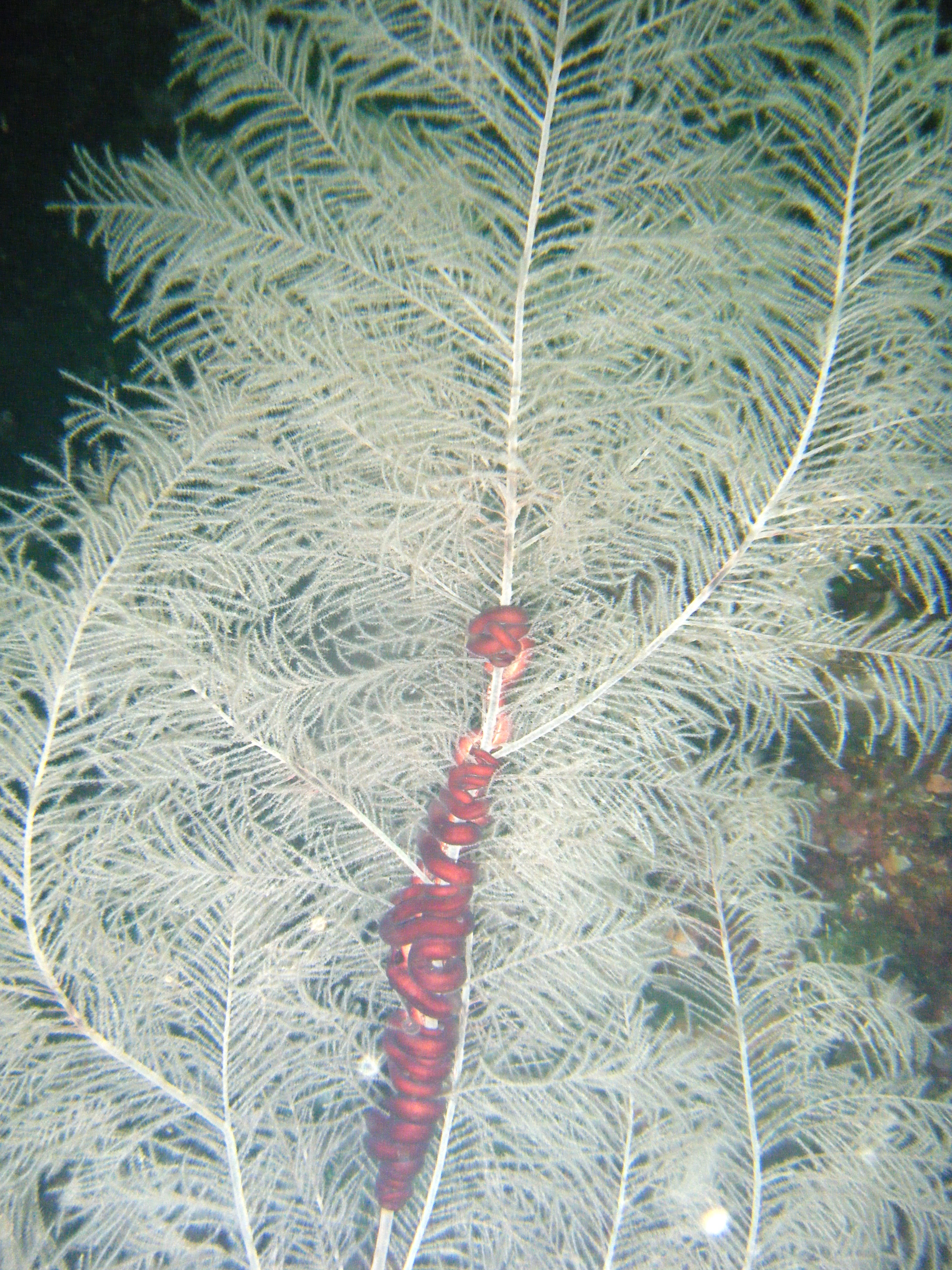
An example of a black coral found at a depth of 15 metres (50 ft) in "the gut" area of the sound, complete with a snake star.

Doubtful Sound (like many of the fiords in the area) is unusual in that it contains two distinct layers of water that scarcely mix. The surface layer 2–10 metres (5–35 ft), referred to as the Low Salinity Layer or LSL, consists of diluted seawater with a typical salinity value of less than 10 psu. This layer receives fresh water fed from the high inflows from the surrounding mountains, and stained brown with tannins from the forest. The outflow of freshwater from the tailrace discharge from the Manapouri Power Station also influences the thickness of the LSL. Below the LSL is a layer of warmer, undiluted seawater with a salinity value of around 35 psu. The dark tannins in the fresh water layer make it difficult for light to penetrate. Thus, many deep-sea species grow in the comparatively shallow depths of the Sound. Such species include black coral Antipathes fiordensis, which is normally found at depths of 30–40 metres (100–130 ft) but can be found at just 10 metres (35 ft) in Doubtful Sound and is within the range of qualified recreational divers.

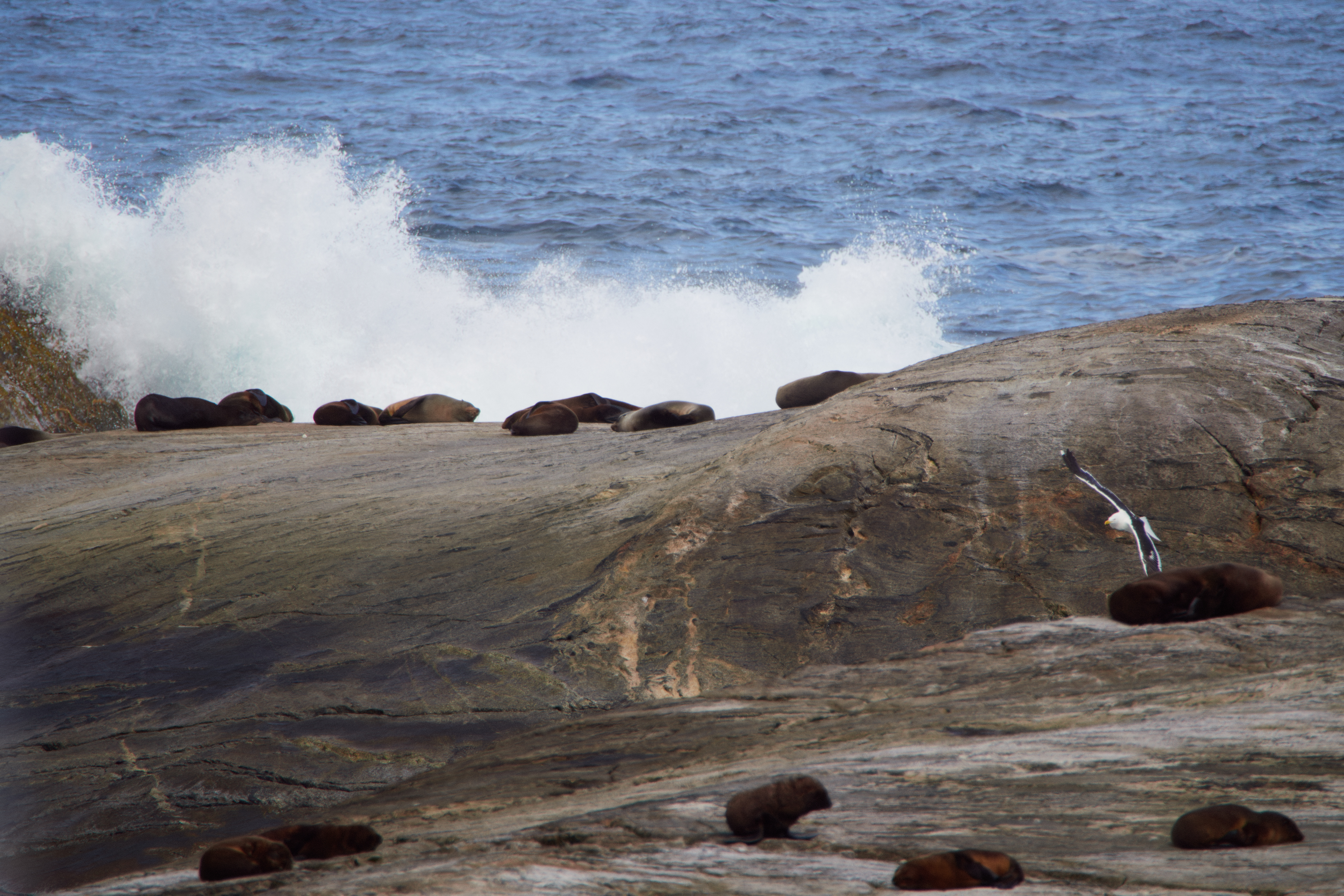
New Zealand fur seals (Arctocephalus forsteri) hauled out on coastal rocks

The catchment basin of Doubtful Sound is generally steep terrain that is heavily forested except for locations where surface rock exposures are extensive. Nothofagus trees are dominant in many locations. In the understory there are a wide variety of shrubs and ferns, including the crown fern, Blechnum discolor.

The fiord is home to one of the southernmost populations of bottlenose dolphins. The Doubtful Sound bottlenoses have formed a very insular subgroup of only about 70 individuals, with none having been observed to leave or enter the Sound during a multi-year monitoring regime. Their social grouping is thus extremely close, which is also partly attributed to the difficult and unusual features of their habitat, which is much colder than the habitats of other bottlenose groups and is also overlaid by the freshwater layer. Recently (2000s), there has been growing concern that the population is in significant decline, with calf survival rates having halved, as well as being noticeably lower than in captivity or in other New Zealand environments. The reasons for this are unclear, though increased tourism and the fresh-water discharge from the Manapouri Power Station (see Hydroelectricity section below) are considered potential causes.

Other wildlife to be found in Doubtful Sound includes fur seals and penguins, or even large whales. Southern right whales and humpback whales are the most frequently seen especially the later. Others include minke whale, sperm whale and some giant beaked whales). Orcas (killer whales) and long-finned pilot whales can be found also. The waters of Doubtful Sound are also home to an abundance of sea creatures, including many species of fish, starfish, sea anemones, and corals. It is perhaps best known for its black coral trees which occur in unusually shallow water for what is normally a deep-water species. The sound has been identified as an Important Bird Area by BirdLife International because it is a breeding site for Fiordland penguins. Secretary Island and Bauza Island are some of the most important sanctuaries in New Zealand for critically endangered birds.

== Hydroelectricity ==
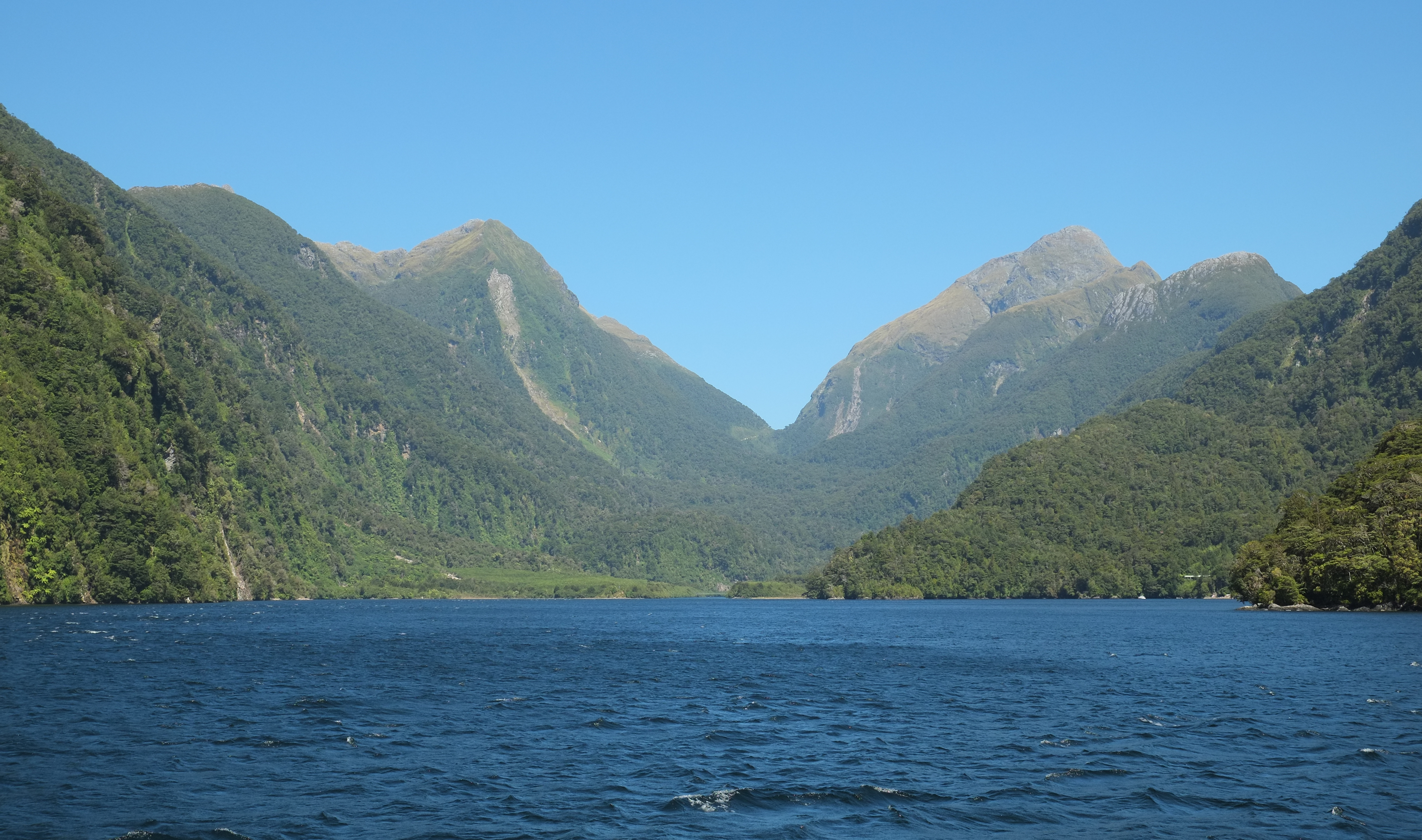
Deep Cove, below Wilmot Pass – the outlet from the Manapouri Hydro Power Station is in the center

Deep Cove (45°27′S 167°09′E), the innermost end of Doubtful Sound, is the site of discharge of water from the Manapouri Power Station's tailrace tunnels. Deep Cove, like the rest of Fiordland, is a unique and mostly pristine environment. The discharge of clear fresh water has affected fauna and flora by letting light into the lower layers of the sound. Nevertheless, this is an area naturally high in fresh water inflows (7.6 metres (24 ft 11 in) of rain falls annually).

The small wharf at Deep Cove is on rare occasion also used to unload any equipment for the Manapouri Power Station that is too large to be ferried across Lake Manapouri. From Deep Cove, such equipment then has to be hauled over Wilmot Pass to the power station.

== Tourism ==
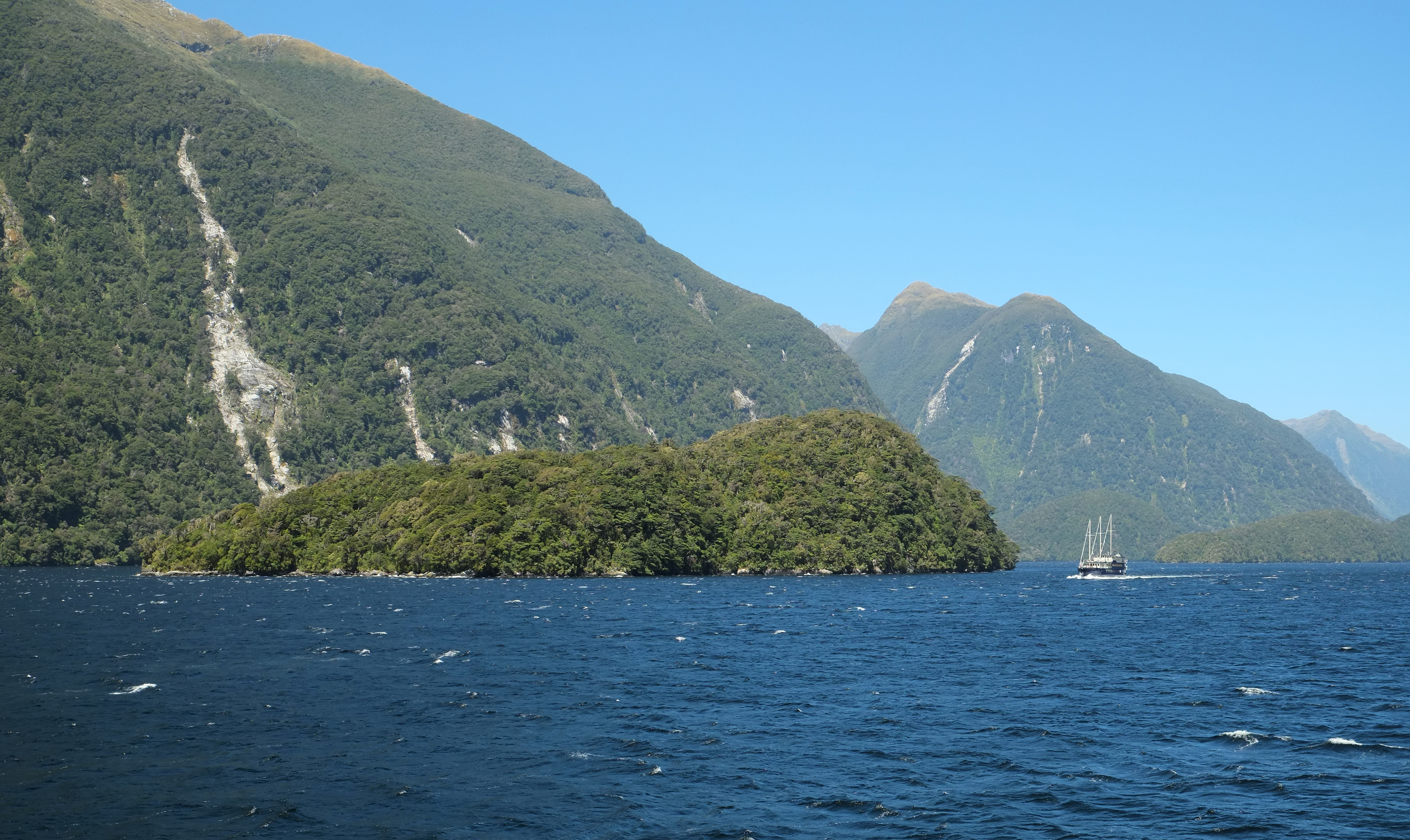
Tall tour boat dwarfed even by one of the smaller islands in Doubtful Sound

Unlike the more easily accessible Milford Sound, it is not possible to drive to Doubtful Sound, as the Wilmot Pass road is not connected to the road network and only connects the Manapouri Hydro Power Station with Deep Cove.

The only options for visitors to visit Doubtful Sound are boat cruises. The less common way to access Doubtful Sound is by sea. However, there are some boat cruises that operate out of the small town of Manapouri. These day trips first take a boat across Lake Manapouri and then a bus on the gravel road across Wilmot Pass to the Sound, where the Doubtful Sound tour boats berth at a small wharf in Deep Cove. The tour companies offer a day option out of Te Anau/Manapouri or an overnight option.
