= Taumoana (Five Finger Peninsula) Marine Reserve =

Marine reserve in Fiordland on New Zealand's South Island

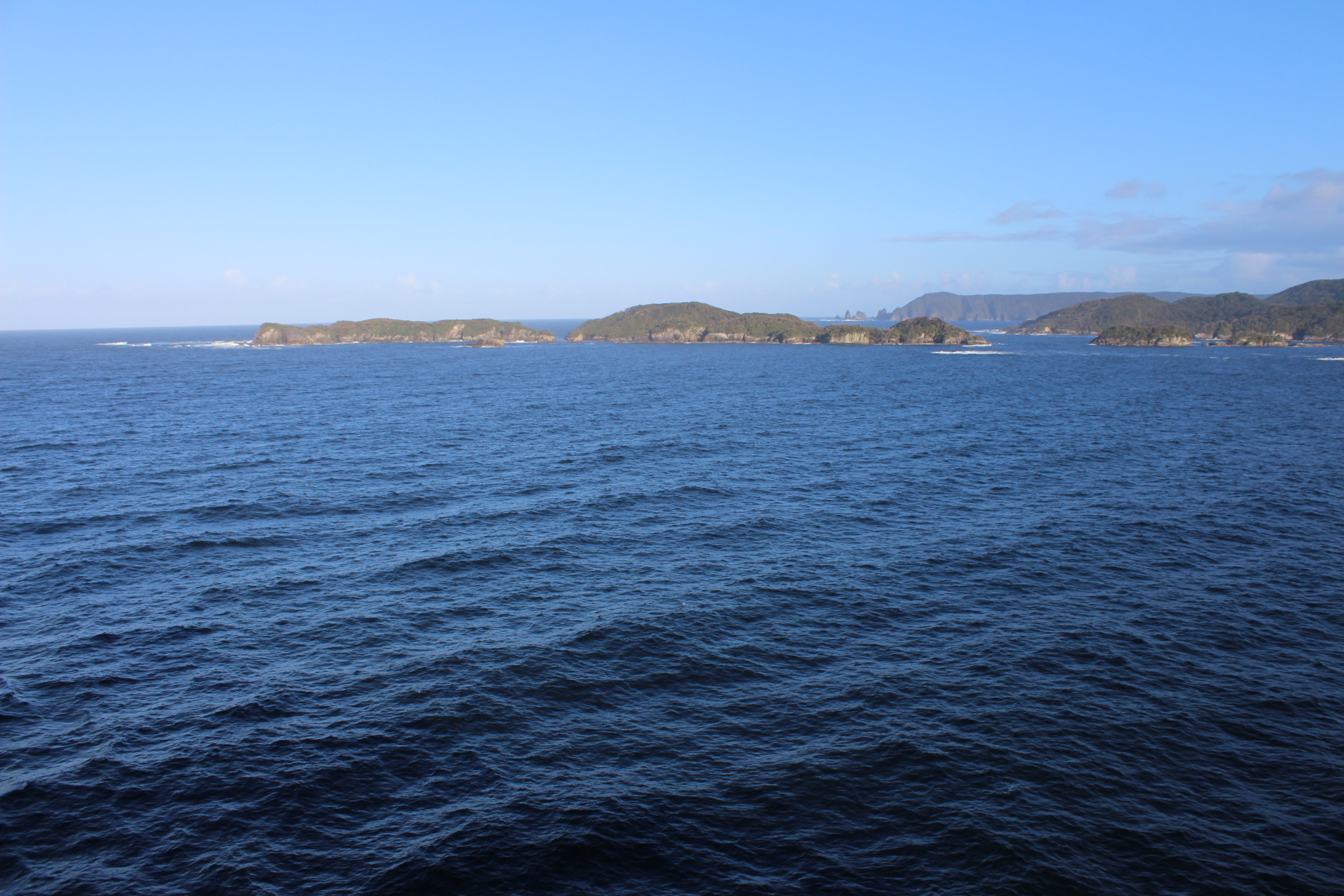
- Entrance to Tamatea / Dusky Sound

- Location within South Island
- Location: Fiordland, New Zealand
- Coordinates: 45.698°S 166.54°E
- Area: 464 hectares (1,150 acres)
- Established: 2005
- Governing body: Department of Conservation

Taumoana (Five Finger Peninsula) Marine Reserve is a marine reserve covering an area of 464 hectares (1,150 acres) in Fiordland on New Zealand's South Island. It was established in 2005 and is administered by the Department of Conservation. It is located next to the Five Fingers Peninsula, at the entrance to Tamatea / Dusky Sound.

== Geography and ecology ==
The reserve is one of the only protected wave-exposed rocky reef habitats in Fiordland, and is more representative of the outer fiords and coastline than Fiordland's other marine reserves. It may contain significant populations of pāua.

The surrounding hillsides create a layer of freshwater above the seawater.

Ocean swells come into the inlet from the southwest to Parrot and Pigeon Islands and the eastern side of the Five Eyes Peninsula. There are shallow and estuary habitats around the peninsula, Cormorant Cove and Facile Harbour. The marine reserve has lots of direct sunlight due to low-lying hillsides.

== History ==
The Māori name Hāwea is after the ancient iwi of Kāti Hāwea.

Early New Zealand conversationist Richard Henry recognised the number of flightless native birds was decreasing after the introduction of predators. In the late 19th century he spent ten years based alone on Pigeon Island, within the current reserve, transporting kākāpō and kiwi to pest-free areas around Fiordland. His home is protected as a site of national significance.

The reserve was part of a conservation strategy the Fiordland Marine Guardians launched in 2002 and presented to the Ministry for the Environment Marian Hobbs and Minister of Fisheries Pete Hodgson in 2003. It was officially established on 21 April 2005.

The Ministry of Primary Industries, Fiordland Marine Guardians and other agencies are involved in protecting the marine reserve and stopping the spread of invasive seaweed.

The New Zealand Air Force conducted aerial surveillance patrols for illegal commercial fishing in 2021.

== Research and commerce ==
Richard Henry's research findings during his time on Pigeon Island have been widely published.

Ongoing educational and scientific activities are encouraged, but must not disturb or endanger plants, animals or natural features. Scientific research requires a permit from the Department of Conservation.

An area within the marine reserve is designated for commercial rock lobster fishers to store holding pots, including pots to sore live lobsters caught outside the reserve. No other commercial or non-commercial fishing or aquaculture is allowed.

== Recreation ==
The reserve is accessible from Te Anau via the Milford Road. Anchoring boats is banned in many areas to protect the particularly fragile species that can be damaged by anchors or swinging chains. Taking off and landing aircraft is permitted.

Pigeon Island and the home of conversationist Richard Henry are accessible via private or tourist boat.

The protected marine life can be viewed by diving or snorkelling, either independently or with a tourism or charter boat service. To protect the fragile environments, divers must follow the safety and care codes.

There is a ban on fishing, and taking, killing or moving marine life and materials. However, members of Ngāi Tahu may remove pounamu provided they have the right authorisation, only collect by hand, keep disturbance to the site to a minimum, and only carry as much as they can in one trip. They may also collect deceased marine mammals and collect teeth and bones.

== See also ==
- Marine reserves of New Zealand
