= Bauza Island =

Island in New Zealand

Mauikatau
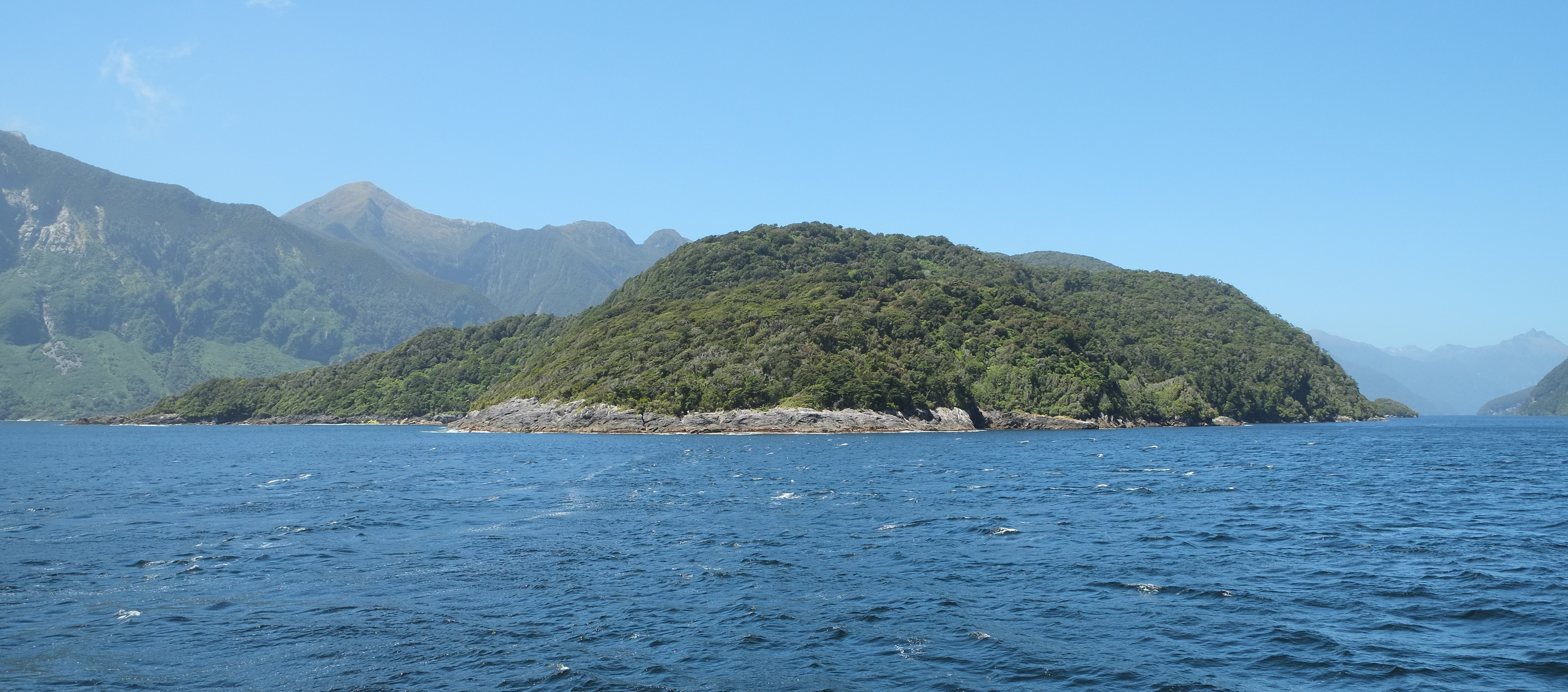
- Bauza Island from west, Secretary Island to the left in the background

- Location within Fiordland

Geography
- Location: Doubtful Sound / Patea
- Coordinates: 45°17′30″S 166°55′0″E
- Area: 4.8 km^{2} (1.9 sq mi)
- Length: 5 km (3.1 mi)
- Width: 1.5 km (0.93 mi)
- Highest elevation: 383 m (1257 ft)

Administration
- New Zealand

Demographics
- Population: 0

Bauza Island (Māori: Mauikatau) lies immediately south of the much larger Secretary Island in the outer reaches of Doubtful Sound / Patea, in Fiordland National Park on New Zealand's South Island. The less than one kilometre wide Patea passage to the south of the island is the main entrance to Doubtful Sound. To the north, the island is separated from Secretary Island by the narrow Te Awaatu Channel, also referred to as "The Gut", only 200 metres (660 ft) wide at its narrowest point. The waters between the two islands are protected by the Te Awaatu Channel (The Gut) Marine Reserve. Doubtful Sound tour boats routinely travel through this channel.

Bauza Island is uninhabited and named after Spanish naval officer Felipe Bauzá, the main cartographer of the Malaspina Expedition to the Americas, Oceania and Australasia between 1789 and 1794.

== Conservation ==
Although Bauza Island is relatively small, it has a high conservation value, with pristine native bush and the only animal pest to have ever made it onto the island being stoats. Stoats were eradicated with a pest trapping campaign between 2002 and 2004, with over 40 traps along tracks following the main ridge of the island. Even though the island is now pest-free, the traps need to be checked and re-baited periodically as stoats have been known to swim distances of over 1 kilometre (0.62 mi). Bauza Island is one of only nine islands in the Fiordland region with no animal pests.

In 2003, before stoats had been eradicated, a group of endangered saddleback (tieke) were transferred to the island, but subsequently killed by stoat. Following the stoat eradication, another 39 of the birds were successfully transferred from Breaksea Island and released on Bauza Island in 2010.

== See also ==
- Desert island
- List of islands
