= Te Awaatu Channel (The Gut) Marine Reserve =

Marine reserve in New Zealand territorial waters

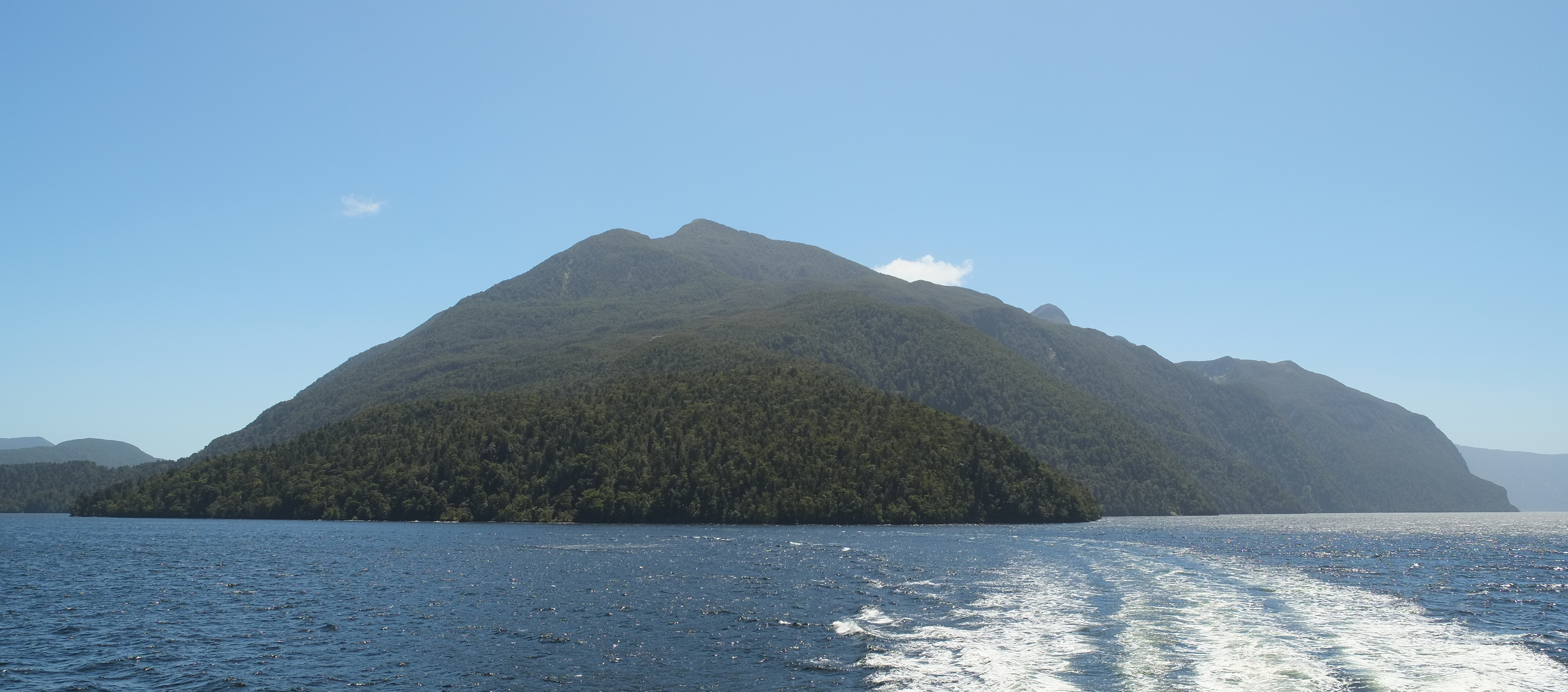
- Secretary Island

- Location within South Island
- Location: Fiordland, New Zealand
- Coordinates: 45.297°S 166.949°E
- Area: 93 hectares (230 acres)
- Established: 1993
- Governing body: Department of Conservation

Te Awaatu Channel (The Gut) Marine Reserve is a marine reserve covering an area of 93 hectares (230 acres) in Fiordland on New Zealand's South Island. It was established in 1993 and is administered by the Department of Conservation.

It is the smallest marine reserve in Fiordland and one of the oldest.

== Geography and ecology ==
The marine reserve covers a shallow channel between Bauza Island and Secretary Island with a high tidal flow. Surrounding the reserve is Fiordland's deepest basin, reaching depths of about 420 metres (1,380 ft).

The reserve has significant rock wall and deep reef habitats, which provide a habitat for suspension feeders like sea pen, red coral, black coral, zoanthids and lampshells.

== History ==
Te Awaatu or Te Awa-O-Tu translates as "the channel of Tu". According to Māori oral history, ancestor Tu-Te-Raki-whanoa carved out the fiords and lakes with his giant ko (digging stick), with one foot on Ka-Tu-Waewae-O-Tu (Secretary Island) at the entrance to Doubtful Sound and the other foot on Mauikatau (Resolution Island) at the entrance to Tamatea / Dusky Sound.

The reserve was recommended by the New Zealand Federation of Commercial Fishermen, alongside the Piopiotahi (Milford Sound) Marine Reserve in the early 1990s. It was established in 1993, receiving legal recognition on 25 October of that year.

Rock lobsters within the reserve are larger and more numerous than outside it, and five year study of red coral has found no major changes to the population.

== Research and commerce ==
Educational and scientific activities are encouraged, but must not disturb or endanger plants, animals or natural features. Scientific research requires a permit from the Department of Conservation.

== Recreation ==
The reserve is accessible from Te Anau via the Milford Road. Anchoring boats is banned in many areas to protect the particularly fragile species that can be damaged by anchors or swinging chains. Taking off and landing aircraft is permitted. Cruises of Doubtful Sound pass through the channel.

The protected marine life can be viewed by diving or snorkelling, either independently or with a tourism or charter boat service. To protect the fragile environments, divers must follow the safety and care codes.

There is a ban on fishing, and taking, killing or moving marine life and materials. However, members of Ngāi Tahu may remove pounamu provided they have the right authorisation, only collect by hand, keep disturbance to the site to a minimum, and only carry as much as they can in one trip. They may also collect deceased marine mammals and collect teeth and bones.

== See also ==
- Marine reserves of New Zealand
