= Whangarei Harbour Marine Reserve =

Marine reserve in New Zealand territorial waters

- Location within Northland Region
- Location: New Zealand
- Coordinates: 35.800829°S 174.416628°E
- Area: 236.51 ha (584.4 acres)
- Established: 2006
- Governing body: Department of Conservation

The Whangarei Harbour Marine Reserve is a protected area in the North Island of New Zealand. It was established in 2006 and measures 236.5 ha (584 acres) over two sites. The students and faculty of the nearby Kamo High School played an important role in establishing this reserve.

The reserve is governed by the Marine Reserves Act 1971 and is administered by the Department of Conservation. It was announced at an event held at Kamo High School in 2006 by Minister of Conservation Chris Carter.

== See also ==
- Marine reserves of New Zealand
