= Tāwharanui Marine Reserve =

Marine reserve in New Zealand territorial waters

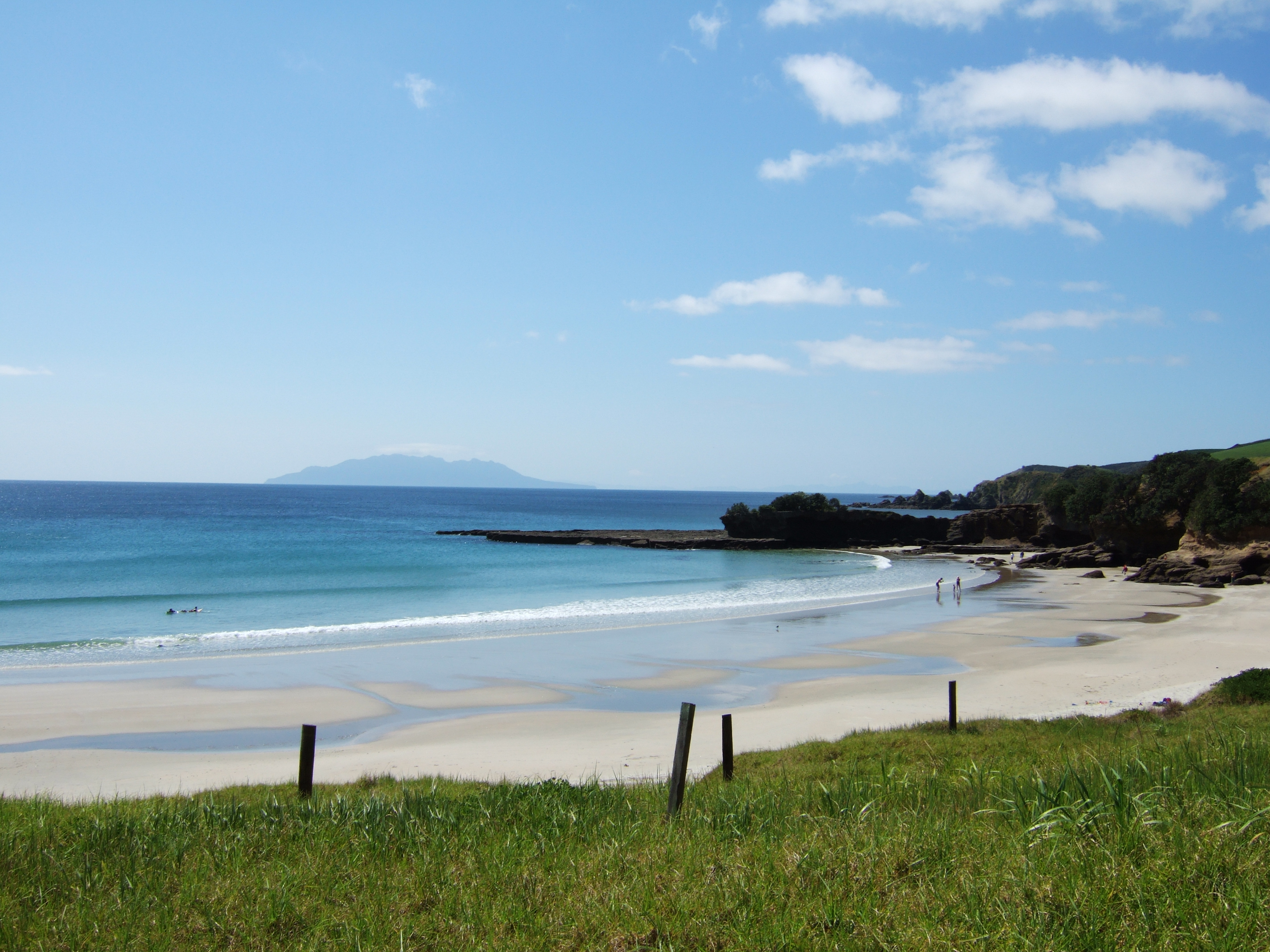
- Tāwharanui Marine Reserve

- Location within North Island
- Location: Auckland Region, New Zealand
- Coordinates: 36.3662351°S 174.7700732°E
- Area: 394 hectares (970 acres)
- Established: 2011
- Governing body: Department of Conservation

Tāwharanui Marine Reserve is a marine reserve covering an area of 394 hectares (970 acres) in the Hauraki Gulf, offshore from the Tāwharanui Peninsula in the Auckland Region of New Zealand's North Island. It was established in 2011 and is administered by the Department of Conservation.

== Geography ==
The reserve covers the area from Mean High Water Mark out to half a nautical mile into the sea, along three kilometres of the coastline.

The coastline contains a range of subtidal habitats, including reefs with overhangs, tunnels and caves. About 50 species of fish have been recorded, including schools of red moki, blue maomao, spotty, red mullet and koheru. There is a thriving population of lobster. Cetaceans such as bottlenose dolphin and orca also visit the waters nearby.

The main geological features of the reserve are exposed greywacke, large grey-green rocks formed during the Jurassic Period studded with marine fossils.

== History ==
Both the Tāwharanui Peninsula and offshore sea area were sources of food and other resources for Māori hapū until well into the 20th century. There is archaeological evidence on the peninsula of shell middens, snapper and other fish bones, and 18 species of shellfish. There is also evidence of nine ships wrecked along the coastline.

Tāwharanui Marine Park was established in 1981.

The marine park was replaced by the larger Tāwharanui Marine Reserve in September 2011, becoming New Zealand's 34th Marine Reserve. According to a New Zealand Treasury report, the new reserve, which covered a more clearly defined area that was 16.2 hectares (40 acres) larger, would provide greater ecological benefits and potentially greater economic benefit.

Monitoring between 1977 and 2020 showed there were more crayfish within the reserve than outside it, but crayfish numbers within the protected area were still declining.

== Recreation ==
The reserve includes lined with pōhutukawa, with rockpools swimming, surfing and camping areas. Boating is permitted, but boats and jetskis must not exceed five knots within 200 metres of the mainland or a dive flag, or within 50 metres of a boat or person in the water. Care must also be taken when anchoring to avoid damaging the sea

The reserve is one of four places in New Zealand where people can snorkel to see abundant crayfish.

There is a ban on fishing, taking or killing marine life, and moving or removing any marine life or materials. People must not feed fish as it disturbs their natural behaviour, and they floor. Dogs are also not permitted at any time, and there is a complete fire ban.

== See also ==
- Marine reserves of New Zealand
