= Moana Uta (Wet Jacket Arm) Marine Reserve =

Marine reserve in New Zealand territorial waters

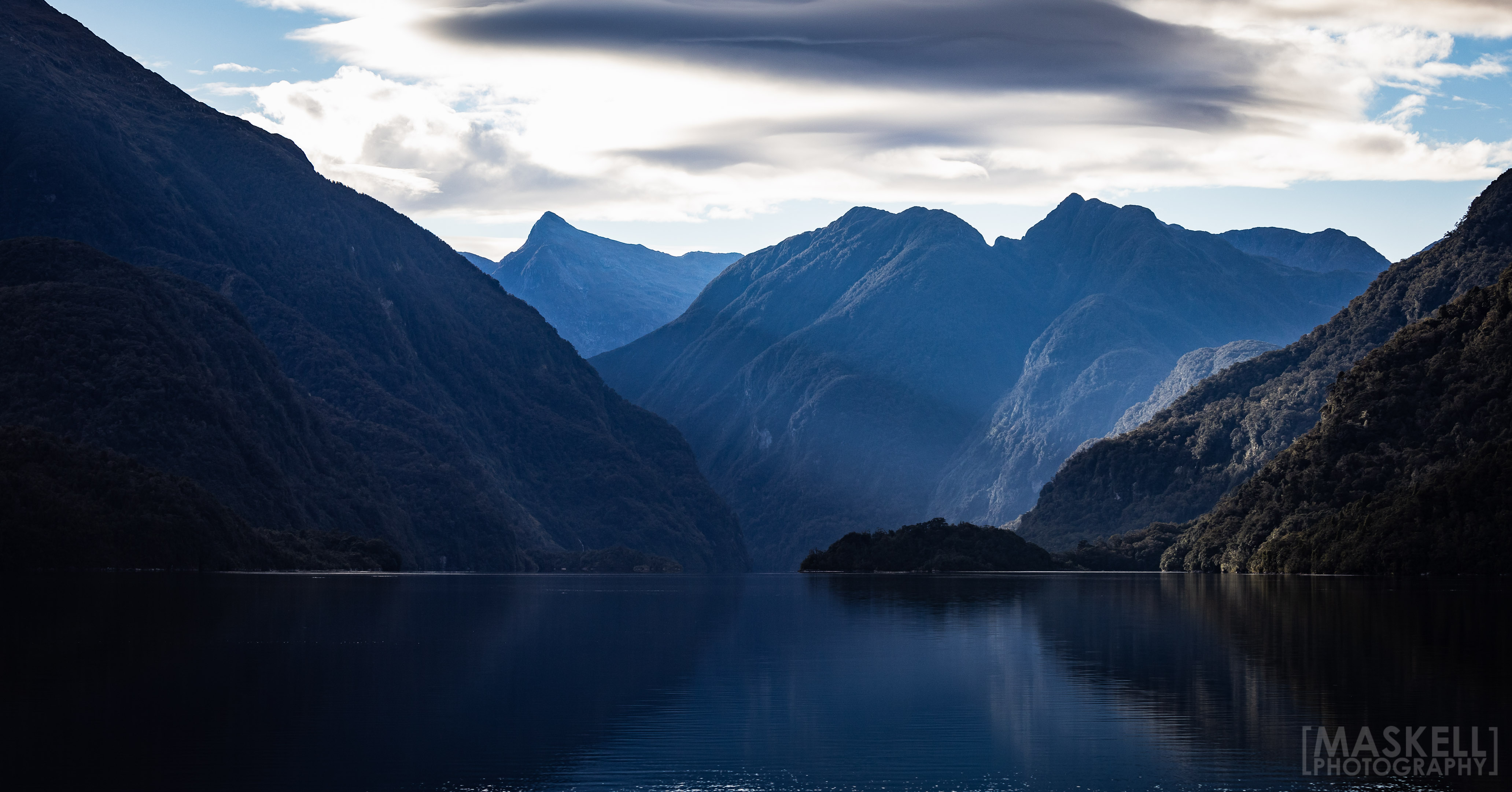
- Wet Jacket Arm

- Location within Fiordland
- Location: Fiordland, New Zealand
- Coordinates: 45.6450°S 166.8365°E
- Area: 2,007 hectares (4,960 acres)
- Established: 2005
- Governing body: Department of Conservation

Moana Uta (Wet Jacket Arm) Marine Reserve is a marine reserve covering the entire length of Wet Jacket Arm in Fiordland on New Zealand's South Island, an area of 2,007 hectares (4,960 acres). It was established in 2005 and is administered by the Department of Conservation.

== Geography and ecology ==
The marine reserve covers the sound between Entry Island and the head of the sound.

In the fiords, heavy rainfall runs off from the surrounding mountains creates a permanent freshwater layer to about 5 centimetres (2.0 in) to 10 metres (33 ft) below the surface. A layer of calm, clear and warm seawater provides a habitat for a range of sponges, corals and fish to about 40 metres (130 ft) below the surface. A final layer of seawater, too darkened by tannins from vegetation run-off to support most marine life, extends to depths of up to 400 metres (1,300 ft).

The fiords are also a habitat for black corals and brittle stars that live in their branches. There are also brachiopods, aihe (bottlenose dolphins), kekono (New Zealand fur seals), tawaki (Fiordland crested penguins) and kororā (little blue penguins).

The Wet Jacket Arm has extensive rock wall, broken rocky reef, deep basin and estuaries. Some rocky reefs under the tidal zone have dense beds of kelp and some kina. Rock walls near Oke Island have more tidal flow, which supports lampshells (brachiopods) and other suspension feeders.

The main deep basin has steep rock wall and no exposure to the open ocean swell, with a moderate to thin freshwater layer, and a large amount of shading from nearby mountains, providing a habitat for the highest density of black coral in Fiordland.

== History ==
The crew of HMS Resolution discovered the area for Europe in 1773. Captain James Cook named the inlet the Wet Jacket Arm after a night when some of the crew rowed the length of the inlet in good weather, only for the weather to change. The group spent the night in wet clothes, unable to light a fire to dry themselves or cook food, and kept away by a storm.

Moose captured by the Canadian Government in Canada were introduced to Fiordland in 1910 and were photographed several times between 1923 and 1952. One photograph, supposedly taken in Wet Jacket Arm in 1953, later turned out from a different location. "Moose hunting" trips continue in the 20th century.

The reserve was part of a conservation strategy the Fiordland Marine Guardians launched in 2002 and presented to the Ministry for the Environment Marian Hobbs and Minister of Fisheries Pete Hodgson in 2003. It was officially established on 21 April 2005.

The Ministry of Primary Industries, Fiordland Marine Guardians and other agencies are involved in protecting the marine reserve and stopping the spread of invasive seaweed.

The New Zealand Air Force conducted aerial surveillance patrols for illegal commercial fishing in 2021.

== Research and commerce ==
Educational and scientific activities are encouraged, but must not disturb or endanger plants, animals or natural features. Scientific research requires a permit from the Department of Conservation.

== Recreation ==
The reserve is accessible from Te Anau via the Milford Road. Anchoring boats is banned in many areas to protect the particularly fragile species that can be damaged by anchors or swinging chains. Taking off and landing aircraft is permitted.

The protected marine life can be viewed by diving or snorkelling, either independently or with a tourism or charter boat service. To protect the fragile environments, divers must follow the safety and care codes.

There is a ban on fishing, and taking, killing or moving marine life and materials. However, members of Ngāi Tahu may remove pounamu provided they have the right authorisation, only collect by hand, keep disturbance to the site to a minimum, and only carry as much as they can in one trip. They may also collect deceased marine mammals and collect teeth and bones.

== See also ==
- Marine reserves of New Zealand
