= Te Hapua (Sutherland Sound) Marine Reserve =

Marine reserve in New Zealand waters

Sutherland Sound Marine Reserve
- Location within South Island
- Location: Fiordland, New Zealand
- Coordinates: 44.76083°S 167.613921°E
- Area: 449 hectares (1,110 acres)
- Established: 2005
- Governing body: Department of Conservation

Sutherland Sound Marine Reserve is a marine reserve covering an area of 449 hectares (1,110 acres) of Sutherland Sound / Sutherland Sound, in Fiordland on New Zealand's South Island. It was established in 2005 and is administered by the Department of Conservation.

== Geography and ecology ==
Sutherland Sound is the least studied and one of the least visited reserves in Fiordland, as ocean waves often break across its shallow entrance, making accessing the reserve by boat dangerous.

Sutherland Sound is the shortest fiord of Fiordland Sound, and is more like a lagoon than a conventional fiord. Heavy rainfall runs off from the surrounding mountains creates a permanent freshwater layer above a layer of calm, clear and warm seawater.

A full range of coastal fish have been seen at the entrance to the Sound, but only spotties have been seen inside the Sound. According to the Department of Conservation, the reserve is likely to be mostly an estuarine habitat, with animals like spiny dogfish, stargazers, flounder and red decorative crabs. The department is planning further research and study.

== History ==
The Sound and marine reserve are named after explorer Donald Sutherland, who first visited the sound in 1883 by rowing down the coast from his home at Milford Sound.

The reserve was part of a conservation strategy the Fiordland Marine Guardians launched in 2002 and presented to the Ministry for the Environment Marian Hobbs and Minister of Fisheries Pete Hodgson in 2003. It was officially established on 21 April 2005.

== Research and commerce ==
Educational and scientific activities are encouraged, but must not disturb or endanger plants, animals or natural features. Scientific research requires a permit from the Department of Conservation.

== Recreation ==
There is limited tourism in the reserve. Sutherland Sound is the only of Fiordland's sounds which with restricted access from the sea, and only very small boats can enter.

Sutherland Sound is the shortest of the Fiordland sounds and the only one with restricted access from the sea. Only very small boats can enter.

There is a ban on fishing, and taking, killing or moving marine life and materials. However, members of Ngāi Tahu may remove pounamu provided they have the right authorisation, only collect by hand, keep disturbance to the site to a minimum and only carry as much as they can in one trip. They may also collect deceased marine mammals and collect teeth and bones.

== See also ==
- Marine reserves of New Zealand
