= Waiau Glacier Coast Marine Reserve =

Marine reserve in West Coast Region, New Zealand

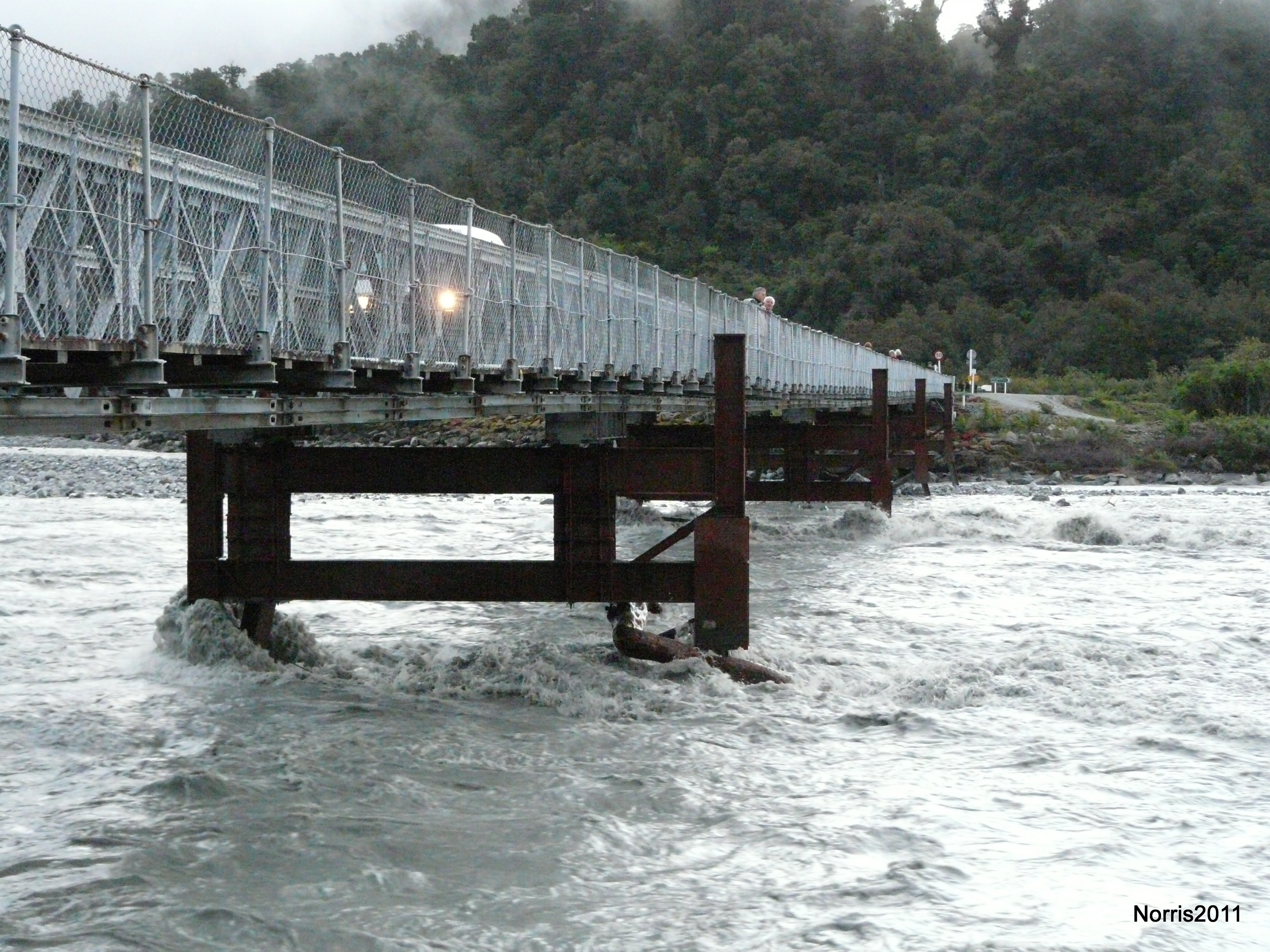
- Waiho River in full flood

- Location within New Zealand
- Location: West Coast Region, New Zealand
- Nearest city: Franz Josef
- Coordinates: 43.28530°S 170.05472°E
- Area: 4,641 hectares (11,470 acres)
- Established: 2014
- Governing body: Department of Conservation

Waiau Glacier Coast Marine Reserve is a marine reserve of the West Coast Region of New Zealand's South Island. It covers an area of 4,641 hectares or 46 km^{2}, from 11 km south from Kohuamarua Bluff near Ōkārito, to Omoeroa Bluff, and about 4 km out to sea.

The reserve takes its name from the Waiho or Waiau River, and the nearby Franz Josef and other glaciers.

The reserve is situated alongside Westland Tai Poutini National Park and Te Wāhipounamu World Heritage Area.

== Geography ==
The Westland Current has also swept gravel and sand north over thousands of years, creating a buffer to the ferocious Tasman Sea, protecting the coastal sea and waterways. The waterways include the Waiho River, Three Mile Lagoon and Five Mile Lagoon.

The river and lagoons in turn feed the area with glacial flow from thick rainforest. Moraine debris and runoff have made the beaches are gravelly and the seabed muddy, and have created distinctive lumpy headlands. There are also regular heavy rainfall events.

== History ==
The reserve was one of five recommended by a forum of Ngāi Tahu, commercial and recreational fishers, conservationists, tourism operators and local councils in 2012. These became the first marine reserves on the West Coast.

The reserve was approved by the Government in March 2013,. It was formally established and opened by Conservation Minister Nick Smith on 7 September 2014.

In April 2019, Forest and Bird asked the Ministry for the Environment to support Westland District Council in cleaning up a large rubbish spill, including potentially toxic waste. In July 2019, the New Zealand Defence Force sent personnel to clean up the nearby Fox River.

== Recreation ==
Visitors can access the reserve by 4WD from the north, via the Three Mile track from Ōkārito, or via the Neils Creek walking and mountain biking track. Hazards include waves on the beach and swift currents in the rivers and lagoon mouths.

The reserve is limited to passive recreation, and limited activities that keep disturbance to a minimum. Permitted activities include riding quad bikes and horses, and collecting a small amount of shells, stones, driftwood, sand and gravel. Pounamu can also be collected by members of Ngāi Tahu Whanui, or with the permission of Te Rūnanga o Ngāi Tahu.

== Wildlife ==
The reserve covers a protected zone where calm wetland, lagoons and coastal seas have created five different kinds of habitats.

Fish, invertebrates and seaweed live in the boulder reefs.

== See also ==
- Marine reserves of New Zealand
