= Te Tapuwae o Hua (Long Sound) Marine Reserve =

Marine reserve

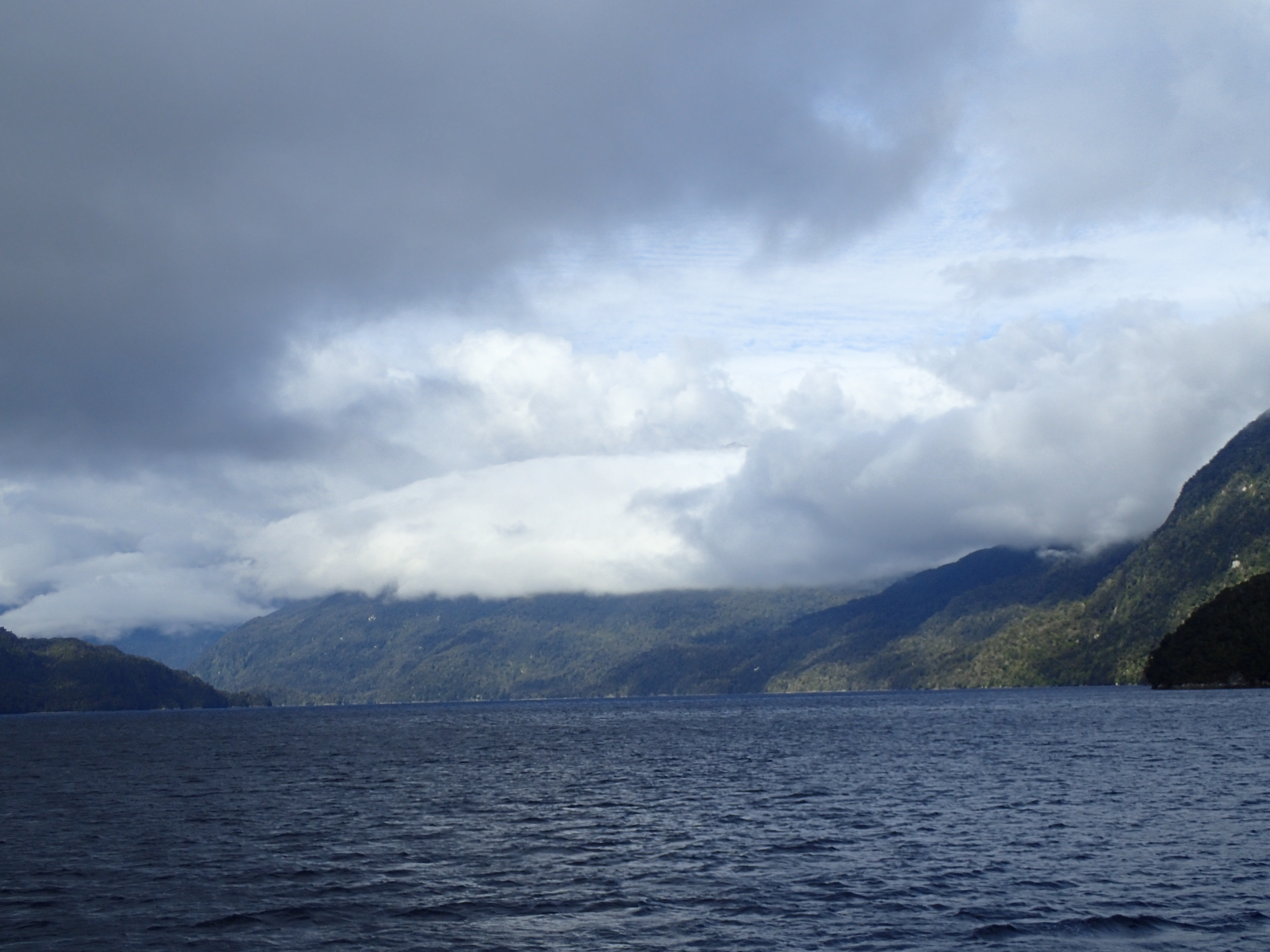
- Te Awaroa / Long Sound

- Location within Fiordland
- Location: Fiordland, New Zealand
- Coordinates: 45.9925°S 166.7864°E
- Area: 3,672 hectares (9,070 acres)
- Established: 2005
- Governing body: Department of Conservation

Te Tapuwae o Hua (Long Sound) Marine Reserve is a marine reserve covering an area of 3,672 hectares (9,070 acres) in Te Awaroa / Long Sound in Fiordland on New Zealand's South Island. It was established in 2005 and is administered by the Department of Conservation.

It is Fiordland's largest reserve.

== Geography and ecology ==
The reserve includes the main Long Sound basin, the most physically isolated basin in Fiordland. Heavy rainfall runs off from the surrounding mountains creates a permanent and thick freshwater layer, which is sheltered from mixing with ocean swells. The rock wall habitats of the sound contain unique suspension feeder communities and species, including a genetically unique 11 armed starfish.

The narrow entrance to Long Sound, known as the Narrows, contains the internationally recognised and delicate "strawberry fields", an area with a large congregations of sea cucumber (strawberry holothurian), red corals and other stony corals.

Further in the Sound, there are high densities of lampshells, tube worms and rock crab.

== History ==
The Māori name Hāwea is after the ancient iwi of Kāti Hāwea.

The reserve was part of a conservation strategy the Fiordland Marine Guardians launched in 2002 and presented to the Ministry for the Environment Marian Hobbs and Minister of Fisheries Pete Hodgson in 2003. It was officially established on 21 April 2005.

The Ministry of Primary Industries, Fiordland Marine Guardians and other agencies are involved in protecting the marine reserve and stopping the spread of invasive seaweed.

The New Zealand Air Force conducted aerial surveillance patrols for illegal commercial fishing in 2021.

== Research and commerce ==
Educational and scientific activities are encouraged, but must not disturb or endanger plants, animals or natural features. Scientific research requires a permit from the Department of Conservation.

An area within the marine reserve is designated for commercial rock lobster fishers to store holding pots, including pots to sore live lobsters caught outside the reserve. No other commercial or non-commercial fishing or aquaculture is allowed.

== Recreation ==
The reserve is accessible from Te Anau via the Milford Road. Anchoring boats is banned in some areas to protect the particularly fragile species that can be damaged by anchors or swinging chains, but taking off and landing aircraft is permitted.

The protected marine life can be viewed by diving or snorkelling, either independently or with a tourism or charter boat service. To protect the fragile environments, divers must follow the safety and care codes.

There is a ban on fishing, and taking, killing or moving marine life and materials. However, members of Ngāi Tahu may remove pounamu provided they have the right authorisation, only collect by hand, keep disturbance to the site to a minimum, and only carry as much as they can in one trip. They may also collect deceased marine mammals and collect teeth and bones.

== See also ==
- Marine reserves of New Zealand
