= Wade Doak =

Wade Doak QSM
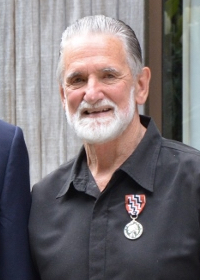
- Doak in 2014
- Born: Wade Thomas Doak; 23 February 1940; Christchurch, New Zealand
- Died: 12 September 2019 (aged 79); Ngunguru, New Zealand
- Education: University of Canterbury
- Occupation: French language teacher at Wellsford High School

Wade Thomas Doak QSM (23 February 1940 – 12 September 2019) was a New Zealand marine conservationist, scuba diver, photographer and filmmaker.

Born in Christchurch, Doak was educated at Christchurch Boys' High School from 1954 to 1958. He began diving in his teens, and met Kelly Tarlton at the Canterbury Underwater Club. In the 1960s, Doak moved to Northland, where he first dove around the Poor Knights Islands with Tarlton. Doak became an acknowledged expert on the marine ecology of the area, and was instrumental in the Poor Knights Islands being made a marine reserve in 1981 and receiving full protection in 1998.

In the 2012 Queen's Birthday and Diamond Jubilee Honours, Doak was awarded the Queen's Service Medal, for services to marine conservation. He died at his home in Ngunguru on 12 September 2019.
