= Parininihi Marine Reserve =

New Zealand marine reserve

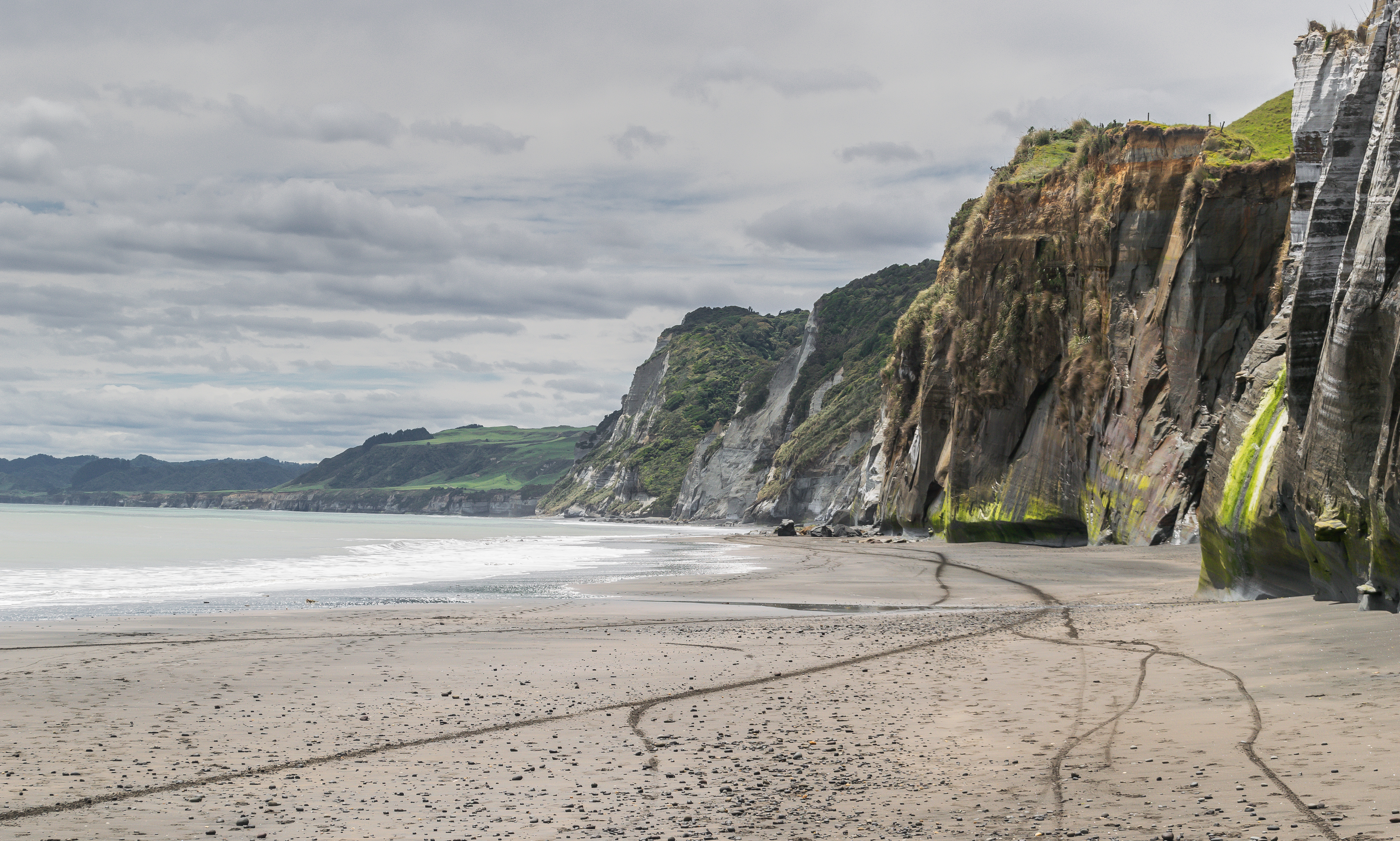
- White Cliffs on the Parininihi coast

- Location within North Island
- Location: New Plymouth District, New Zealand
- Nearest city: New Plymouth
- Coordinates: 38°51′45″S 174°31′21″E
- Area: 1,800 hectares (4,400 acres)
- Established: 2006
- Governing body: Department of Conservation

Parininihi Marine Reserve is a marine reserve administered by the Department of Conservation, covering 1,800 hectares (4,400 acres) in the North Taranaki Bight. It is located offshore of the west coast of New Zealand's North Island, north-east of New Plymouth.

== Geography ==
The reserve includes Pariokariwa Reef, which has a highly diverse ecosystem including a range of unique sponge gardens. The reef extends north from Pariokariwa Point.

Most of the reef are submerged five to 23 metres below the water surface, surrounded by fine sediment and mud. Other parts form small caves, overhangs, canyons and pinnacles after the water, encrusted with large bryozoan colonies, colourful sponges, and hydroids, anemones and soft corals. The area has a large population of rock lobsters, and fish species like blue cod, blue moki, red moki, gurnard, john dory, kahawai, red cod, terakihi, trevally and snapper. There is also a range of rare and exotic sponges like Polymastia pepo, which are spread in a colourful carpet along the ledge of the reef.

== History ==
The reef is of cultural, spiritual, historical, and traditional importance to Ngāti Tama, who knew of the area as a rich fishing ground in pre-European times. The iwi still has customary fishing rights in the area.

In December 1998, Conservation Minister Nick Smith confirmed the reef would become a marine reserve to protect the sea sponges and corals. However, an area including Waikiekie Reef was excluded due to feedback from the fishing industry.

The reserve was established by an order on 11 September 2006, which took effect 28 days later on 9 October 2006.

In April 2015, the Department of Conservation said it had received reports of illegal fishing in the reserve but hadn't found it.

In December 2017, a report found the redevelopment of a nearby section of State Highway 3 could release sediments and other contaminants into the reserve.

== Recreation ==
Boats can access the area from the New Plymouth boat ramp, Tongapurutu River, Urenui River and Waitara River. There is road access via Pukearuhe Road from Urenui. There is no regular charter boat access.

Diving is allowed within the reserve, but there is often rough sea conditions and poor visibility.

Fishing or taking wildlife from the reserve is not allowed.

Other passive recreational activities are also allowed, such as swimming, photography, sightseeing and picnicking on the shore. Educational and scientific activities are allowed, provided they don't disturb or endanger the reserve's flora and fauna.

== See also ==
- Marine reserves of New Zealand
