= Punakaiki Marine Reserve =

Marine reserve in New Zealand territorial waters

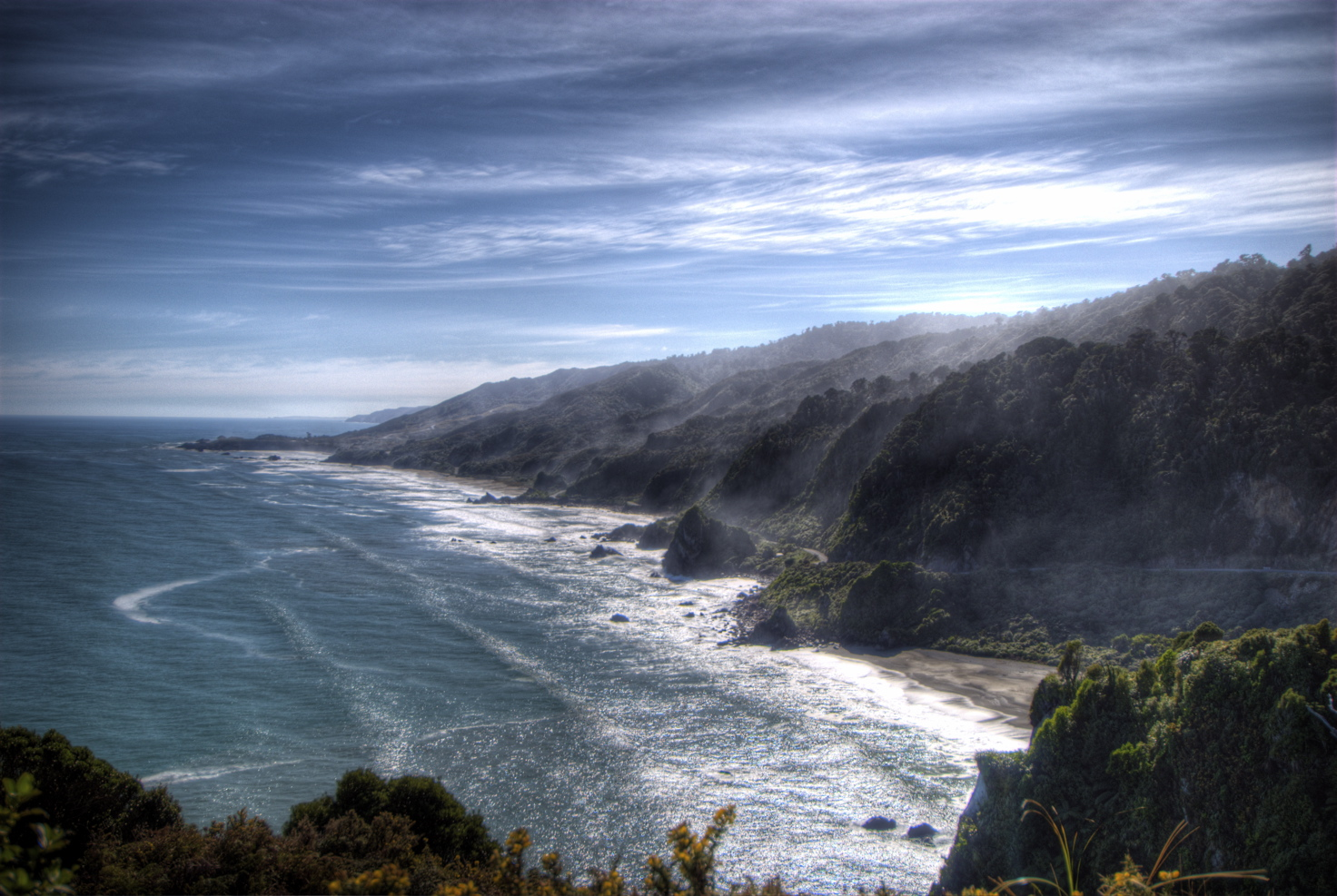
- Punakaiki Marine Reserve coastline

- Location within South Island
- Location: Punakaiki, Buller District, New Zealand
- Coordinates: 42.113933°S 171.3228833°E
- Area: 3,520 hectares (8,700 acres)
- Established: 2014
- Governing body: Department of Conservation

Punakaiki Marine Reserve is a marine reserve administered by the Department of Conservation. The reserve includes the area of sea surrounding the pancake rocks and blowholes at Dolomite Point, at Punakaiki on the West Coast Region of New Zealand's South Island. It also includes most of the coastline on the western edge of Paparoa National Park.

The reserve covers an area of 3,520 hectares (8,700 acres) and was established in 2014.

== Geography ==
Punakaiki Marine Reserve extends approximately 10.8 kilometres (6.7 mi) from Perpendicular Point south to Maher Swamp, and about 3.7 kilometres (2.3 mi) offshore. It includes natural coastlines and catchments within Paparoa National Park. The reserve does not include two inshore areas around the Pororari River beach and Punakaiki River beach.

Within the reserve there are natural examples of six habitat types, including rocky, gravel and cobble shore habitats reaching out to sandy seabed areas about 20 metres (66 ft). The array of bird and marine life includes tāiko, weka, fur seal and the Hector's dolphin. Little blue penguins also nest in the area.

Several species within the reserve are under potential threat, including waterfowl and indigenous waders, such as white-fronted tern, Westland petrel, sooty shearwater, fairy prion and banded dotterel, as well as red-billed gulls.

== History ==
=== History before establishment ===
The landscape of the reserve has formed over millions of years. The pancake rocks began forming 30 million years, when lime-rich fragments of dead marine shells started to collect on the sea floor. These were layered with soft mud and clay, and plant sediments. The rocks were raised by earthquakes and then etched out by the sea.

The reserve was one of five recommended in 2012 by the West Coast Marine Protection Forum, a group of representations of Ngāi Tahu, commercial and recreational fishers, conservationists, tourism operators and local councils. The Minister of Conservation, Nick Smith, approved the reserve in March 2013, and it was gazetted later that year.

=== History since establishment ===
The reserve came into existence on 7 September 2014.

A gold mining operation already operating in the area were allowed to continue on existing scale and extent. Farmers were allowed to continue driving cattle and sheep with dogs and using vehicles on the foreshore. The owner or occupier of land next to Hibernia Creek were also allowed to continue using construction vehicles and non-motorised handheld tools to open the outlet.

In 2015, the Ministry for Primary Industries proposed a regulatory change to prohibit mobile, bottom-impacting commercial fishing methods in the river mouths enclosed by the reserve.

A German tourist was caught taking mussels from the reserve in January 2015. The Department of Conservation investigated reports of kontiki longline fishing from beaches within the reserve in April 2016. By October 2016, no other major breaches had been reported.

In 2020 the National Institute of Water and Atmospheric Research, the Department of Conservation and the University of Canterbury used drones to map the plants and animals in the marine reserve, including large kelp beds off the coast.

== Recreation ==
A range of activities are banned in the marine reserve, including fishing, taking or killing marine life, and moving or removing any marine life or materials. People must not feed fish as it disturbs their natural behaviour, and they must take care when anchoring to avoid damaging the sea floor.

There are two areas at river mouths enclosed by the marine reserve, where eeling, whitebaiting and recreational fishing are allowed. Quad bikes and horses are allowed, and small stones, shells, driftwood, sand and gravel can also be carried out of the site. Certain Ngāi Tahu members are allowed to collect pounamu in accordance with tradition.

According to the Department of Conservation, weather and sea conditions can change rapidly on the coast, and people need to be aware of large waves when walking on the beach or rocky shore. It urges people to check weather forecasts, take adequate food, water, warm clothing and wet weather gear, and tell someone where they are going.

== See also ==
- Marine reserves of New Zealand
