= Hautai Marine Reserve =

New Zealand marine reserve

- IUCN category Ia (strict nature reserve)
- Location within New Zealand
- Interactive map of Hautai Marine Reserve
- Location: West Coast Region, New Zealand
- Nearest city: Haast
- Coordinates: 44.23980°S 168.10447°E
- Governing body: Department of Conservation

Hautai Marine Reserve is a marine reserve offshore from the Westland District and West Coast Region of New Zealand's South Island.

It is the country's most remote mainland main reserve, located south of Haast, a two day walk from the nearest road, in an area with no walking tracks.

The reserve was established to protect marine habitats and animals of the southern West Coast. Marine mammals like New Zealand fur seals, Fiordland crested penguins and blue penguins are abundant.

== See also ==
- Marine reserves of New Zealand
