= Kahurangi Marine Reserve =

Marine reserve in New Zealand territorial waters

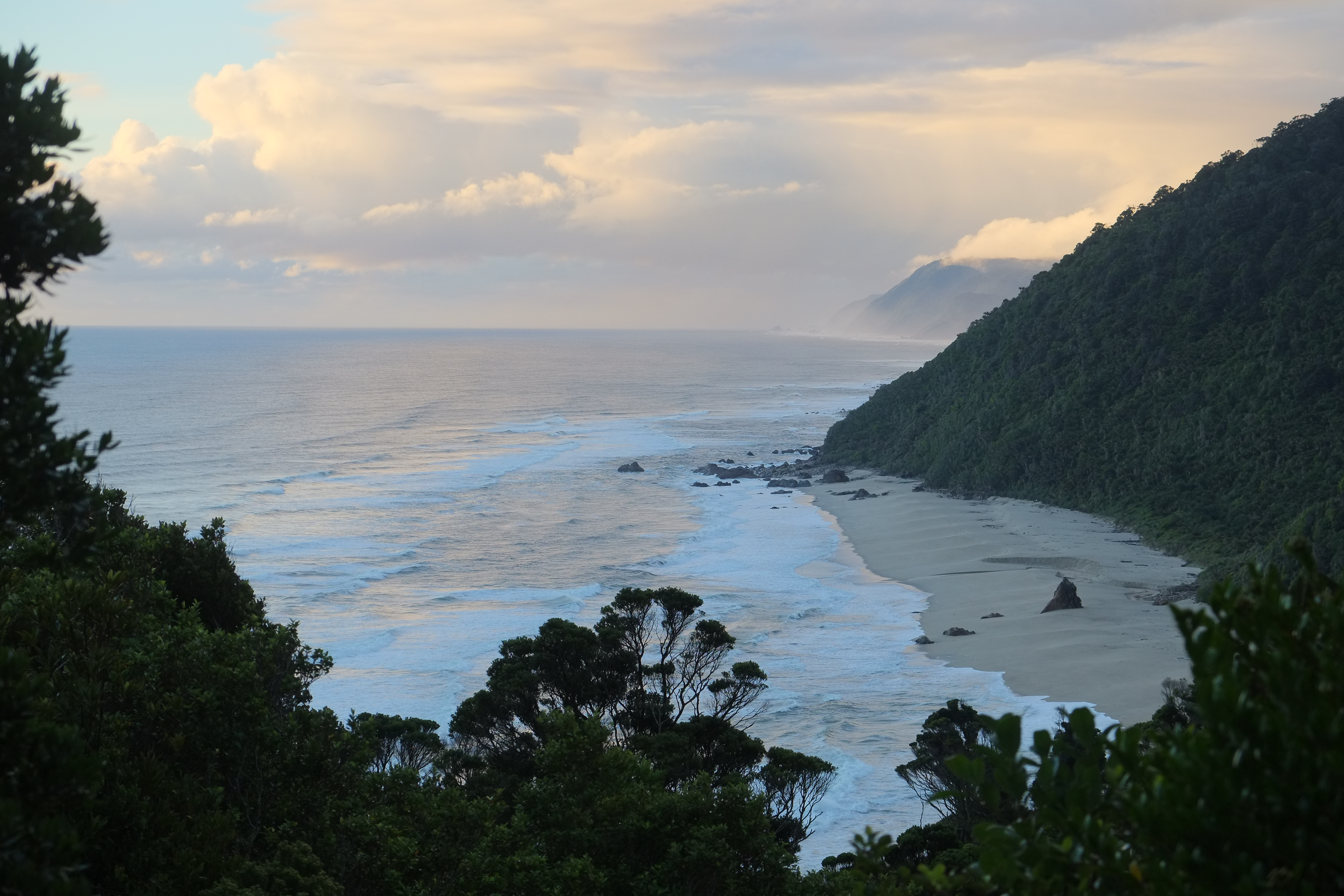

- Location within South Island
- Location: Buller District, New Zealand
- Nearest city: Nelson
- Coordinates: 40.957941°S 172.1010063°E
- Area: 8,419 hectares (20,800 acres)
- Established: 2014
- Governing body: Department of Conservation

Kahurangi Marine Reserve is a marine reserve administered by the Department of Conservation, covering 8,419 hectares (20,800 acres) offshore of Kahurangi National Park in the Buller District of New Zealand's West Coast Region.

== Geography ==
Kahurangi is one of the largest marine reserves in New Zealand, extending along 16 kilometres (9.9 mi) of coastline between Wekakura Point and Crayfish Point, and 5 kilometres (3.1 mi) out to sea.

The reserve features an area of remote coastline with sandy beaches and boulders, alongside nīkau forest. The northern end of the coast is a habitat for fur seals (Kekeno) and Hector's dolphins, and driftwood along the coast is a habitat for animals like earwigs, sandhoppers and spiders. Rocky reefs and seastacks provide a habitat for encrusting animals, invertebrates and inshore fish that thrive in murky waters.

The reserve reaches depths of about 50 metres (160 ft), with a seabed of mud and sand providing a habitat for burrowing shellfish and coastal fish like flounder, gurnard, snapper and sharks.

== History ==
The reserve was proposed in September 2011, and was formally approved by Conservation Minister Nick Smith in March 2013. It was much smaller than what had originally been proposed.

The regulation establishing the marine reserve was passed by Prime Minister John Key on 11 August 2014, and took effect 7 September 2014.

In October 2016, rangers using a helicopter spotted the crew of a fishing vessel trawling within the reserve.

In December 2017, another fisher was fined $16,000 for fishing in the reserve.

In December 2020, a man from Nelson was fined $13,500 for commercial fishing in the marine reserve. According to a court summary of facts, he deployed a bottom trawl net the previous New Year's Eve while travelling back from a fishing trip at Greymouth. He did not know the area was a marine reserve.

== Recreation ==
Visitors are urged to travel with sufficient food, water, warm clothing and wet weather gear, and tell people where they are going and when they expect to return. They must remain at least 20 metres (66 ft) from seals at all times.

Quad bikes and horses can be ridden within the reserve, provided disturbance is minimal. Small stones, shells, driftwood, sand and gravel can be collected in small quantities by hand. Pounamu can also be collected by Ngāi Tahu or with iwi permission.

== See also ==
- Marine reserves of New Zealand
