= Poor Knights Islands Marine Reserve =

Protected area off the coast of New Zealand

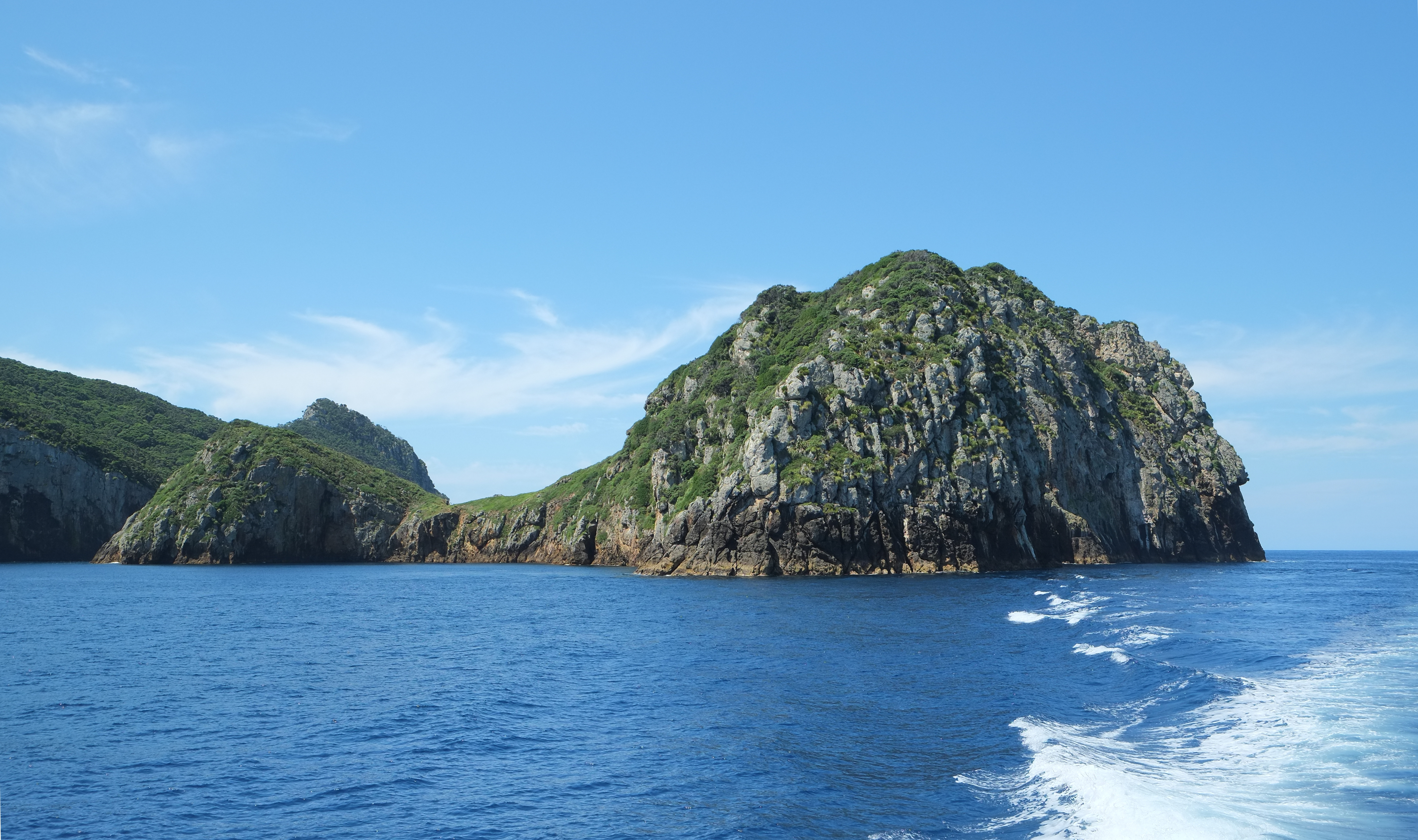
- Archway Island, within the Poor Knights Islands

- Location within New Zealand
- Location: New Zealand
- Coordinates: 35°30′S 174°45′E
- Area: 1,890 ha (7.3 sq mi)
- Established: 1981
- Governing body: Department of Conservation

The Poor Knights Islands Marine Reserve is a protected area off the coast of the North Island of New Zealand. The reserve, established in 1981 and covering an area of 1,890 ha (4,700 acres), is administered by the Department of Conservation. It surrounds the Poor Knights Islands and adjacent rock stacks Sugarloaf Rock and High Peak Rocks. It is one of the world's ten most popular sites for scuba diving. with dive trips regularly leaving from the town of Tutukaka.

The reserve has also been one of the primary areas studied and documented by Wade Doak, one of New Zealand's most prominent marine experts and advocates for marine reserves.

== History of fishing in the reserve ==
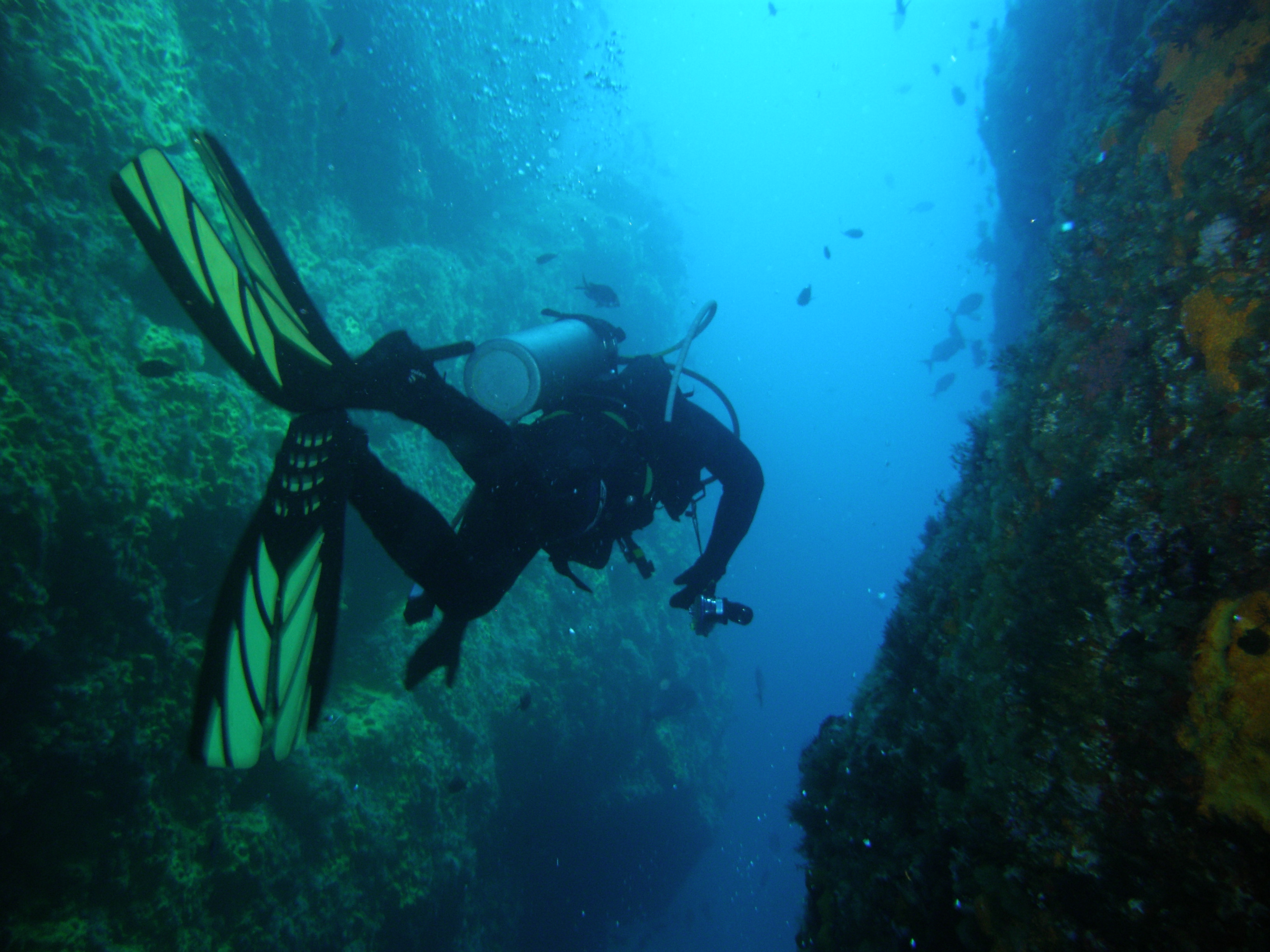
A diver at the northern arch

According to Bill Ballantine the government was pressured by three New Zealand Herald editorials to create the marine reserve around Poor Knights. When the reserve was founded in 1981, commercial fishing was banned, but recreational fishing was still allowed. A full ban on fishing was finally implemented seventeen years later in 1998. Currently, it is prohibited to disturb marine life or remove rocks or shells in the marine reserve. No commercial fishing is permitted within one nautical mile (1,852 m) and long lining is the only commercial fishing permitted between one and three nautical miles. The islands are a popular diving location due to the variety of marine fauna found there, and are popular also for their intriguing landforms, which include natural arches and caves.

== Effects of the change in fishing regulations ==
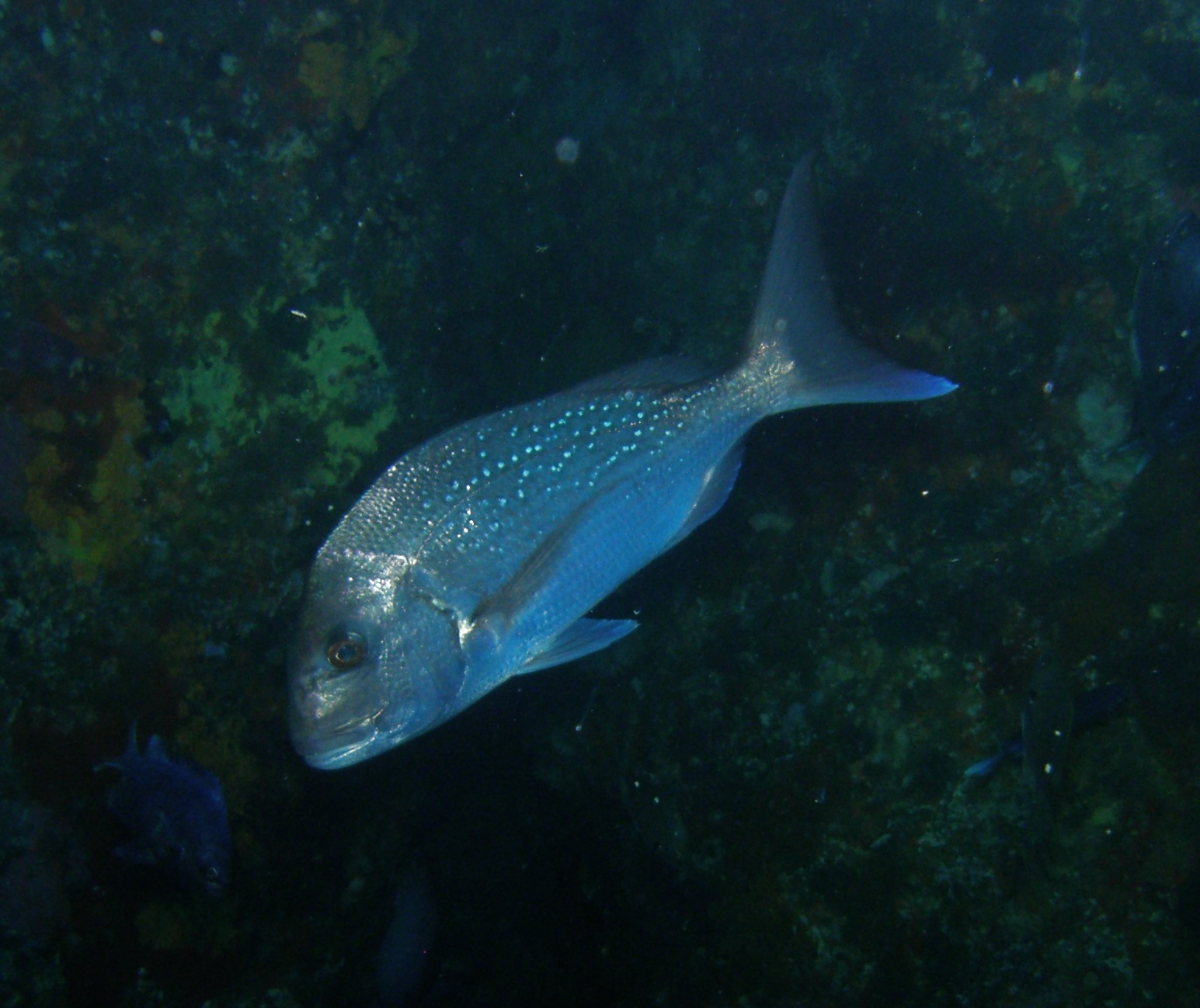
A snapper within the marine reserve

A study examined the response of snapper (Pagrus auratus) to the establishment of a no-take reserve around the Poor Knights Islands. The Poor Knights and two reference locations, Cape Brett and the Mokohinau Islands, were sampled biannually for four years using baited underwater video (BUV).

Following full marine reserve status at the Poor Knights in October 1998, snapper showed significant increases in abundance and biomass relative to fished control locations. This was particularly apparent for large snapper (>270 mm), whose numbers increased rapidly to levels 7.4 times higher in the final survey compared to the initial pre-reserve survey, and total snapper biomass increased by 818%. There was no significant increase in the abundance, biomass or size of snapper at the reference locations over this time.

While the incredible increase in snapper density resulted from the immigration of adult fish into the reserve, rather than from within-reserve recruitment, these results suggests that partial fishing regulations, as implemented in the early years of the reserve, are ineffective for protecting targeted species.

== See also ==
- Marine reserves of New Zealand
