= Westhaven (Te Tai Tapu) Marine Reserve =

Marine reserve in New Zealand territorial waters

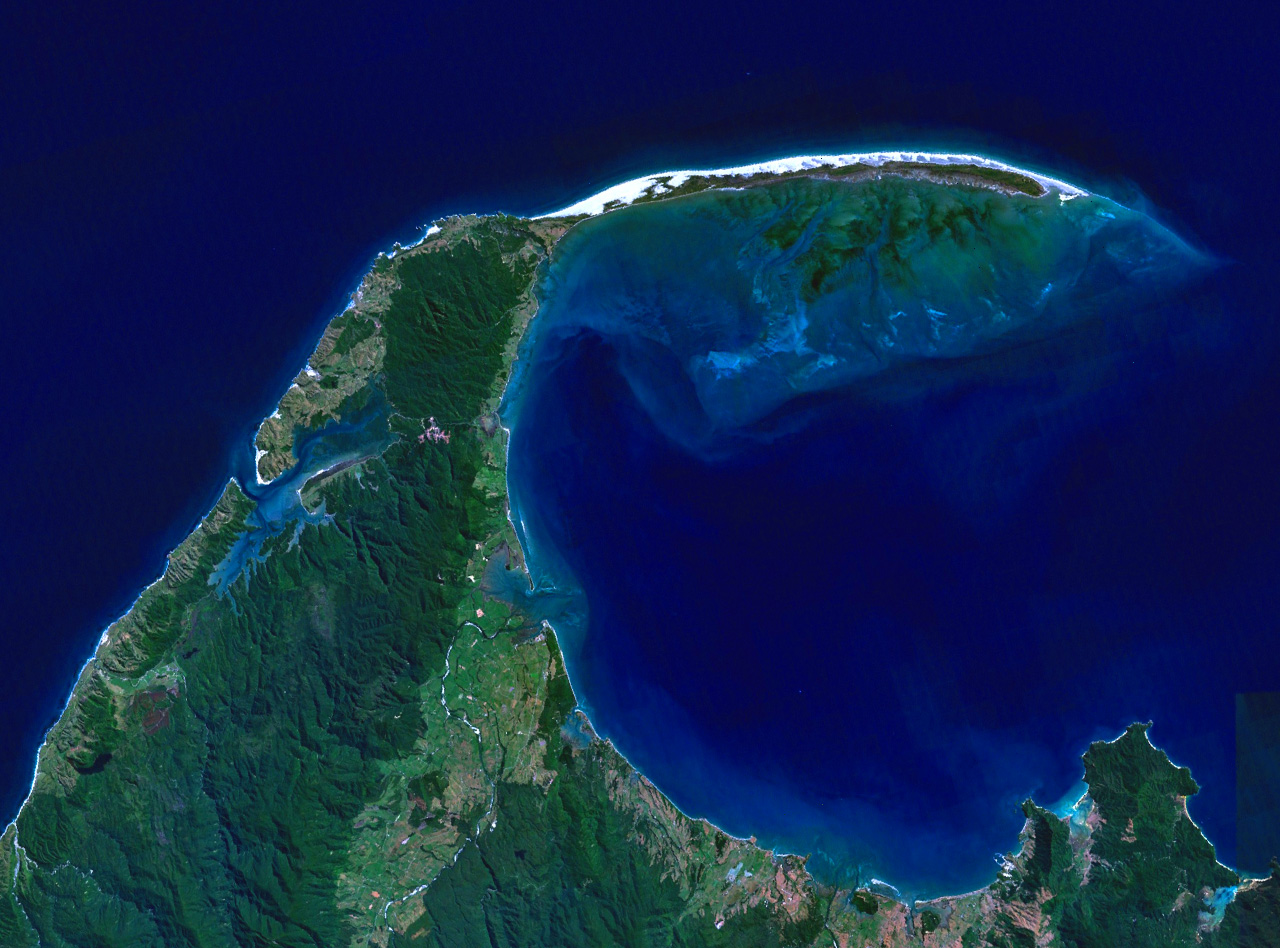
- The northern Tasman District, with the Whanganui Inlet on the west coast and the large Golden Bay to the east

- Location within South Island
- Location: Tasman District, New Zealand
- Coordinates: 40.5920229°S 172.6323606°E
- Area: 536 hectares (1,320 acres)
- Established: 1994
- Governing body: Department of Conservation

Westhaven (Te Tai Tapu) Marine Reserve is a marine protected area that covers the southern fifth of the Whanganui Inlet at the top of New Zealand's South Island. It has an area of 536 hectares (1,320 acres). The other 2,112 hectares (5,220 acres) of the inlet is the Westhaven (Whanganui Inlet) Wildlife Management Reserve. The marine reserve was established in 1994. Both reserves are administered by the Department of Conservation.

The inlet is on the west coast, just south-west of Cape Farewell and north-west of Collingwood, in the Tasman District. Road access is from the road between Collingwood and Farewell Spit, with a turn-off heading westward just north of Pākawau.

== Geography ==
The estuary is an enclosed and submerged river valley about 13 kilometres (8.1 mi) long and 2–3 kilometres (1.2–1.9 mi) wide. It divides into northeast and southwest tidal channels, spilling out onto expansive sandflats. The estuary is surrounded by lush native forest.

Within the boundary of the marine reserve, seagrass beds, salt marshes, tidal wetlands, dunes, cliffs, islands, rock platforms and underwater reefs provide habits for a range of species.

== History ==
Ngāti Rārua, Ngāti Tama and Te Āti Awa used the inlet as a place to live and gather food. There is still evidence of sacred sites and past occupation.

When European settlers arrived, the coastal forest was logged, flax was milled, and coal and gold mined. The forest has regenerated since then, with limited permanent ecological damage.

The marine reserve was officially established on 9 May 2014.

Local man Murray Gavin purchased a section of the forest in 1987 to protect and restore it. The forest was sold to the New Zealand Government in 2005 and added to the Kahurangi National Park in 2016. Minister of Conservation Nick Smith celebrated the addition by kayaking through the marine reserve.

== Flora and fauna ==
At least 30 species of marine fish use the inlet for some of their life cycle. Snapper, flatfish and kahawai use it as a breeding and nursery area. Other fish enter the estuary to feed in the seagrass beds and sandflats.

Many waders and sea birds fly around the inlet and farmland. Numerous other birds live in the coastal forest, including kererū (wood pigeon), welcome swallow, bellbird and tūī. Some birds find their food in the inlet but live in the forest or wetland, including sacred kingfisher and banded rail.

== Recreation ==
All plant and animal life within the marine reserve are protected, and fishing and shooting are not permitted. Vehicle launching of boats is permitted at Mangarākau Wharf and near the Kaihoka Road turnoff.

People must not feed fish as it disturbs their natural behaviour, and they must take care when anchoring to avoid damaging the sea floor.

== See also ==
- Marine reserves of New Zealand
