= Marine reserves of New Zealand =

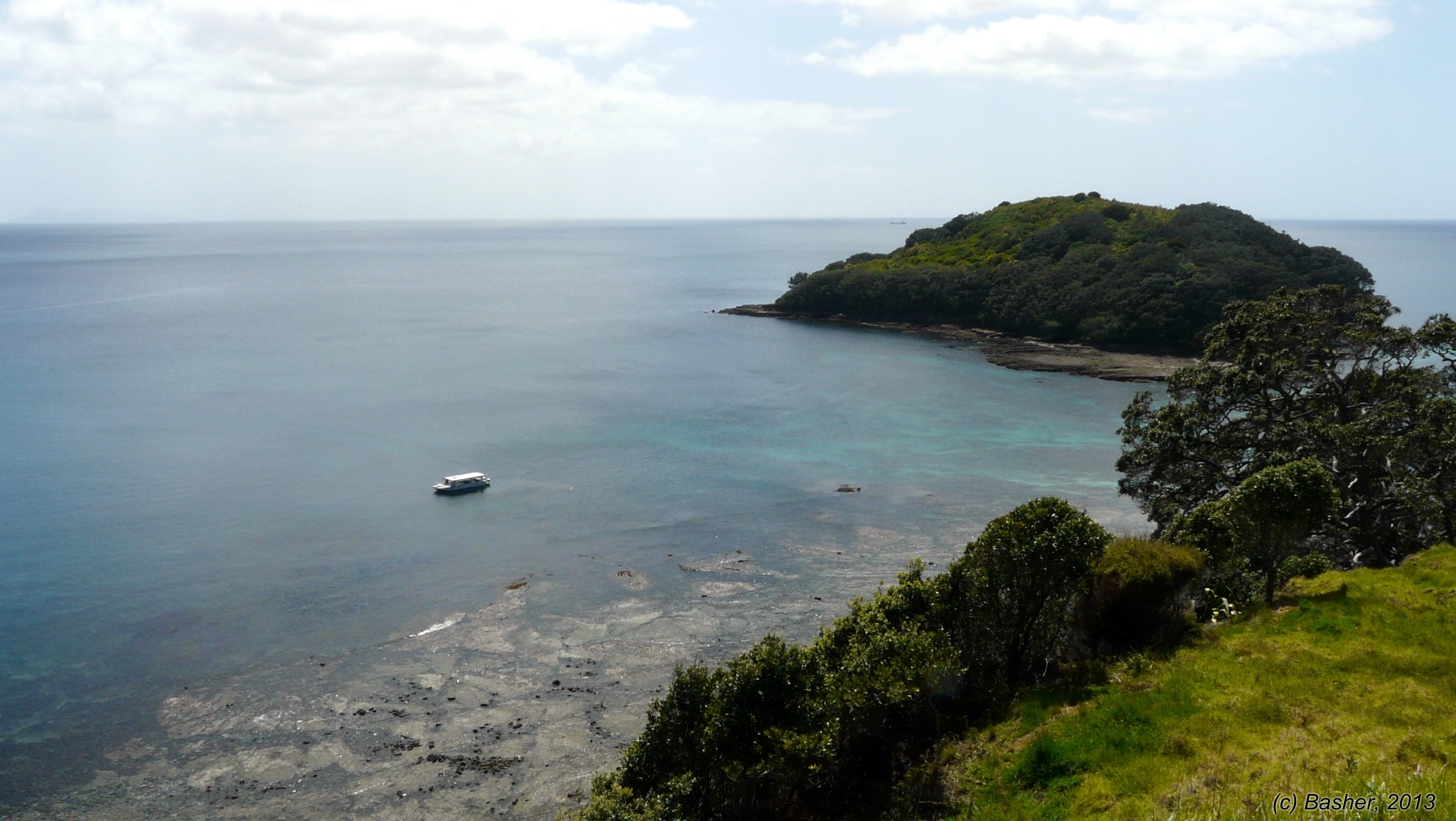
Goat Island Marine Reserve

New Zealand has 49 marine reserves (as of July 2026) that are spread around the North, the South Island, and neighbouring islands, and on outlying island groups. They are governed by the Marine Reserves Act 1971 and administered by the Department of Conservation with assistance from the Ministry for Primary Industries (formally the Ministry of Fisheries), New Zealand Customs Service and the New Zealand Defence Forces.

== History ==
The Marine Reserves Act was passed by the Parliament of New Zealand in 1971. In 2001, the Department of Conservation published a review of the Act, resulting in a draft Marine Reserves Bill that was introduced into Parliament in June 2002, but did not progress past the select committee stage.

The first marine reserve to be created was the Cape Rodney-Okakari Point Marine Reserve. The Poor Knights Islands Marine Reserve was established next, although with only a partial ban on fishing; a full ban was implemented in 1998. The first two marine reserves in Fiordland were established at the request of New Zealand Federation of Commercial Fishermen in 1993. An additional eight reserves were established in Fiordland on the recommendation of the Guardians of Fiordland in 2005. The Whangarei Harbour Marine Reserve was established in 2006 with the active support of the students and faculty of nearby Kamo High School.

== Effects ==
The abundance of fish within the reserves creates spillover, or larval export, that boosts catches in neighbouring areas. In general, the reserves tend to attract a lot of recreational divers and fishermen. The divers are attracted to the abundant fish, coral, etc. inside the reserves. The fishermen are attracted to the areas just outside the reserves – where spillover creates an abundance of large game fish not found in other areas.

The Cape Rodney-Okakari Point Marine Reserve, in particular, receives more than 200,000 visitors per year. It is a popular spot for snorkelers and scuba-divers, due to the abundance and diversity of fish now living within the reserve after over 30 years of protection. Species that can be found in the reserve include Australasian snapper and New Zealand sea urchin (kina).

== List of reserves ==
List of marine reserves in New Zealand
Name	Image	Map	Area (ha)	Date created	Notes
Akaroa Marine Reserve			512	2014	Covers an area around the eastern side of the entrance to Akaroa Harbour, known for marine mammals including Hector's dolphins, whales, and seals.
Auckland Islands - Motu Maha Marine Reserve			498,000	2003	Covers a range of marine environments in the water around the Auckland Islands.
Cape Rodney-Okakari Point Marine Reserve			547	1975	The first marine reserve to be established in New Zealand.
Hautai Marine Reserve			853	2014	Located in a remote corner of New Zealand's West Coast, making it the most remote marine reserve on New Zealand's main archipelago.
Hawea (Clio Rocks) Marine Reserve			411	2005	Covers the inner reaches of Hāwea / Bligh Sound.
Hikurangi Marine Reserve			10,416	2014	Deepest marine reserve around the mainland of New Zealand, covering a large area of the Kaikōura Canyon and Hikurangi Trough.
Horoirangi Marine Reserve			904	2005	Also known as the Glenduan Marine Reserve, covers the eastern side of Tasman Bay and protects a unique transition zone with a range of reef-dwelling species.
Kahukura (Gold Arm) Marine Reserve			464	2005	Protects the entirety of the Gold Arm of Taiporoporo / Charles Sound, which includes a range of red and black corals
Kahurangi Marine Reserve			8,419	2014	
Kapiti Marine Reserve			2,167	1992	
Kermadec Islands Marine Reserve			748,000	1990	
Kutu Parera (Gaer Arm) Marine Reserve			433	2005	
Long Bay-Okura Marine Reserve			980	1995	
Long Island-Kokomohua Marine Reserve			619	1993	
Moana Uta (Wet Jacket Arm) Marine Reserve			2,007	2005	
Motu Manawa-Pollen Island Marine Reserve			501	1995	
Moutere Hauriri / Bounty Islands Marine Reserve			104,626	2014	
Moutere Ihupuku / Campbell Island Marine Reserve			290,000	2014	
Moutere Mahue / Antipodes Island Marine Reserve			217,287	2014	
Parininihi Marine Reserve			1,844	2006	
Piopiotahi (Milford Sound) Marine Reserve			690	1993	
Pōhatu Marine Reserve (Flea Bay)			215	1999	
Poor Knights Islands Marine Reserve			1,890	1981	
Punakaiki Marine Reserve			3,520	2014	
Taipari Roa (Elizabeth Island) Marine Reserve			613	2005	
Tapuae Marine Reserve			1,404	2008	
Taputeranga Marine Reserve			855	2008	
Taumoana (Five Finger Peninsula) Marine Reserve			1,466	2005	
Tauparikākā Marine Reserve			17	2014	
Tāwharanui Marine Reserve			394	2011	
Te Angiangi Marine Reserve			446	1997	
Te Awaatu Channel (The Gut) Marine Reserve			93	1993	
Te Hapua (Sutherland Sound) Marine Reserve			449	2005	
Te Matuku Marine Reserve			690	2005	
Te Paepae o Aotea (Volkner Rocks) Marine Reserve			1,267	2006	
Te Tapuwae o Hua (Long Sound) Marine Reserve			3,672	2005	
Te Tapuwae o Rongokako Marine Reserve			2,452	1999	
Tonga Island Marine Reserve			1,835	1993	
Tuhua (Mayor Island) Marine Reserve			1,060	1992	
Ulva Island - Te Wharawhara Marine Reserve			1,075	2004	
Waiau Glacier Coast Marine Reserve			4,557	2014	
Westhaven (Te Tai Tapu) Marine Reserve			536	1994	
Whanganui A Hei (Cathedral Cove) Marine Reserve			840	1993	
Whangarei Harbour Marine Reserve			237	2006	Protects two separate areas within Whangārei Harbour: an intertidal mudflat and mangrove forest at Waikaraka, and the waters around Motukaroro / Passage Island. Was established following efforts by students from Kamo High School.
Hākinikini Marine Reserve			600	2026	
Ōkaihae Marine Reserve			500	2026	
Ōrau Marine Reserve			2,900	2026	
Papanui Marine Reserve			16,800	2026	
Waitaki Marine Reserve			10,100	2026	

== See also ==
- Environment of New Zealand
- Marine park
- National parks of New Zealand
- Nature reserves of New Zealand
- Protected areas of New Zealand
