= Piopiotahi (Milford Sound) Marine Reserve =

Marine reserve in Fiordland, New Zealand

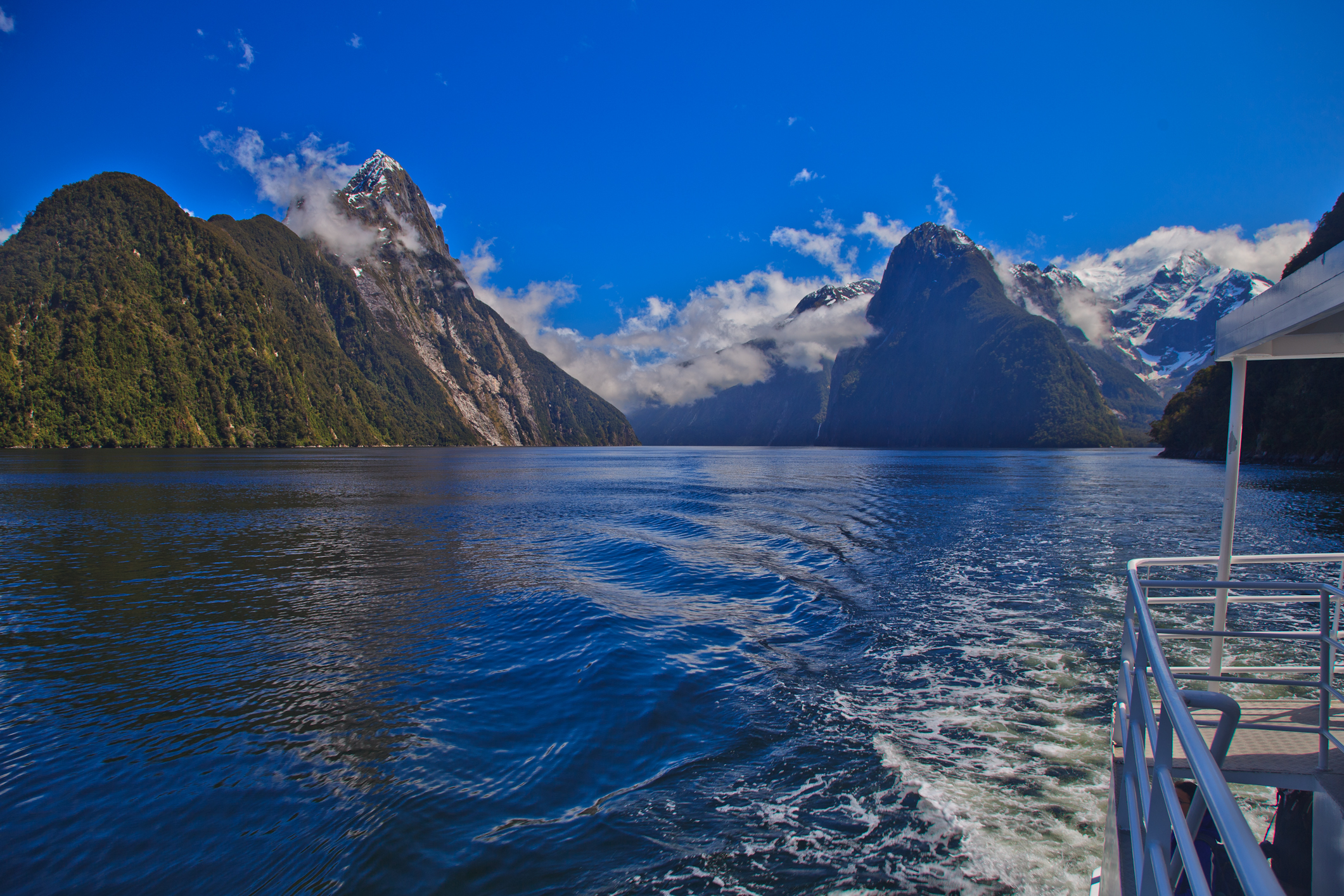
- Milford Sound, with the marine reserve on the northern (right) side

- Location within South Island
- Location: Fiordland, New Zealand
- Coordinates: 44°38′53″S 167°54′20″E
- Area: 690 hectares (1,700 acres)
- Established: 1993
- Governing body: Department of Conservation

Piopiotahi (Milford Sound) Marine Reserve is a marine reserve covering an area of 690 hectares (1,700 acres) in the Milford Sound / Piopiotahi, in Fiordland on New Zealand's South Island. It was established in 1993 and is administered by the Department of Conservation.

The marine reserve spans 16 kilometres (9.9 mi) and 690 hectares (1,700 acres) of the northern half of Milford Sound, stretching from the Milford Sound Village to Dale Point where the sound meets the Tasman Sea. Fishing restrictions also apply to the other half of the sound.

== Geography and ecology ==
Most of the sound is a mostly deep muddy fiord basin, with deep reefs and some shallow rock walls along the shore. Delicate deep water invertebrates encrusting tubeworms, sea sponges, soft corals, colonial sea squirts, black coral and sea anemones are fixed to a very steep rock-wall on the inner northern side of the sound.

Closer to the sea, schools of butterfly perch, rock lobster and reef fish live alongside octopus, stingrays, seals and the odd bottlenose dolphin.

In the fiords, heavy rainfall runs off from the surrounding mountains creates a permanent freshwater layer to about 5 centimetres (2.0 in) to 10 metres (33 ft) below the surface. A layer of calm, clear and warm seawater provides a habitat for a range of sponges, corals and fish to about 40 metres (130 ft) below the surface. Further down, tannins from vegetation run-off make the sea too dark to support most marine life.

The fiords are also a habitat for black corals and brittle stars that live in their branches. There are also brachiopods, aihe (bottlenose dolphins), kekono (New Zealand fur seals), tawaki (Fiordland crested penguins) and kororā (little blue penguins).

== History ==
The reserve was established in 1993, receiving legal recognition on 25 October of that year.

The Māori name of the reserve, Piopiotahi, translates to "one native thrush". The now extinct piopio was a ground-feeding bird wiped out by pests like rats and stoats.

The Ministry of Primary Industries, Fiordland Marine Guardians and other agencies are involved in protecting the marine reserve and stopping the spread of invasive seaweed.

== Research and commerce ==
Educational and scientific activities are encouraged, but must not disturb or endanger plants, animals or natural features. Scientific research requires a permit from the Department of Conservation.

== Recreation ==
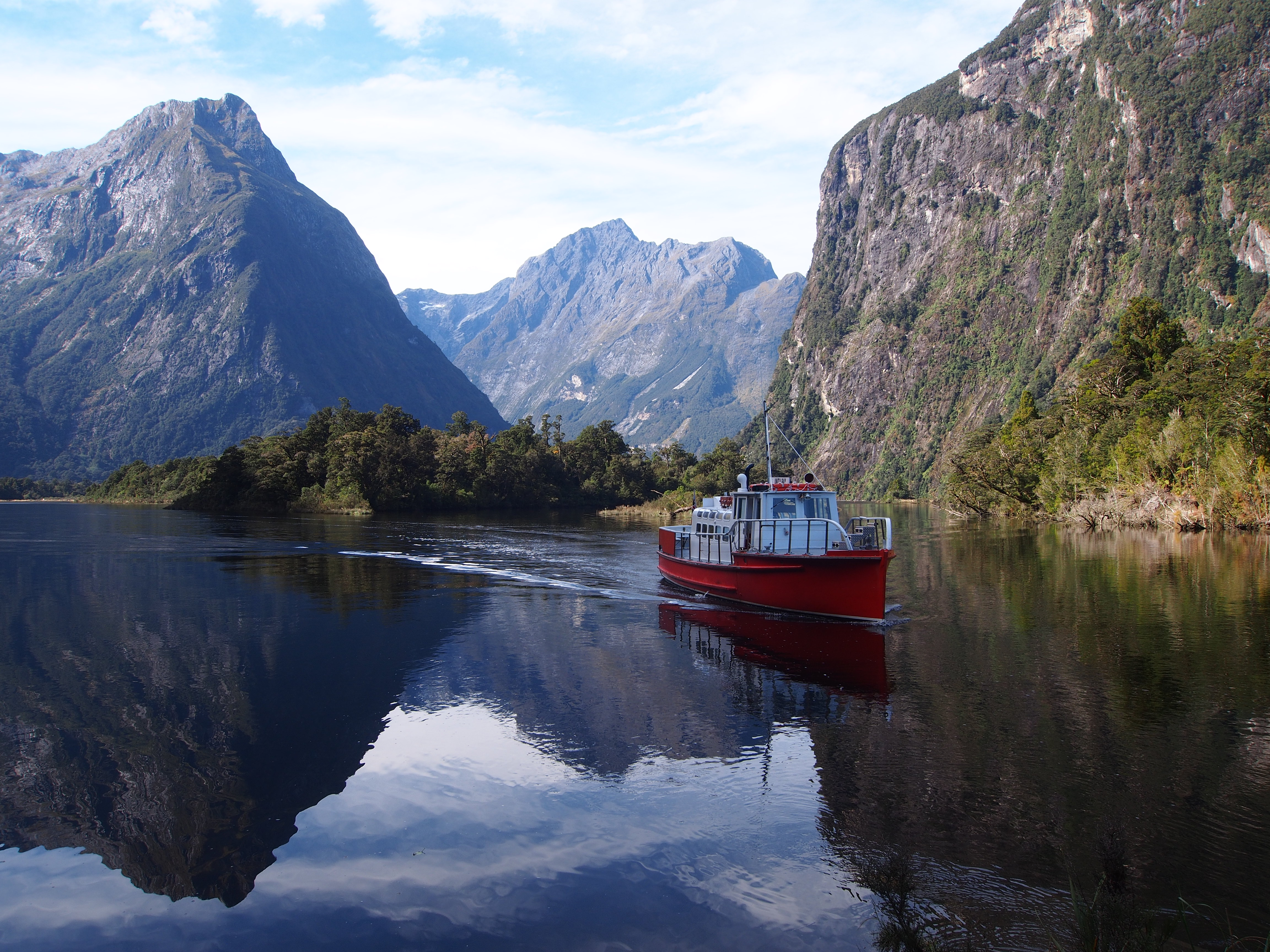
A boat in the Milford Sound.

=== Cruises and diving ===
The reserve is accessible from Te Anau via the Milford Road. It is the most popular destination for cruises and diving excursionsm particularly because of its black coral and fiord landscape.

Anchoring boats is banned in many areas to protect the particularly fragile species that can be damaged by anchors or swinging chains. Taking off and landing aircraft is permitted.

The protected area can be viewed by diving or snorkelling, either independently or with a tourism or charter boat service. To protect the fragile environments, divers must follow the safety and care codes. Divers can see stingrays, crayfish, octopus, seals, sharks and more than 100 species of fish.

=== Fishing ===
There is a ban on fishing, and taking, killing or moving marine life and materials from within the reserve. However, members of Ngāi Tahu may remove pounamu provided they have the right authorisation, only collect by hand, keep disturbance to the site to a minimum, and only carry as much as they can in one trip. They may also collect deceased marine mammals and collect teeth and bones.

Limited fishing is allowed outside of the marine reserve area. Tarakihi and hāpuku (grouper) can be found throughout the year, and yellowtail kingfish (Seriola lalandi, known by the common name "amberjack" in North America), tuna and broadbill can be caught during the right season with the right equipment. Blue cod cannot be caught from the internal waters but can be caught from the open sea outside the sound.

A limited number of rock lobsters can be taken from the Sound.

== See also ==
- Marine reserves of New Zealand
