= Marine Reserves Act 1971 =

Act of Parliament in New Zealand

New Zealand Parliament
- Long title: An Act to provide for the setting up and management of areas of the sea and foreshore as marine reserves for the purpose of preserving them in their natural state as the habitat of marine life for scientific study
- Administered by: Ministry of Agriculture and Fisheries, and the Department of Conservation.

Legislative history
- Passed: 1971
- Status: Current legislation

The Marine Reserves Act is an Act of Parliament in New Zealand.

In 2000 the Department of Conservation started a review of the Act resulting in a draft Marine Reserves Bill that was introduced into Parliament in June 2002.

== See also ==
- List of marine reserves in New Zealand
