= Fiordland =

Geographical region of New Zealand

Coordinates: 45.4°S 167.2°E

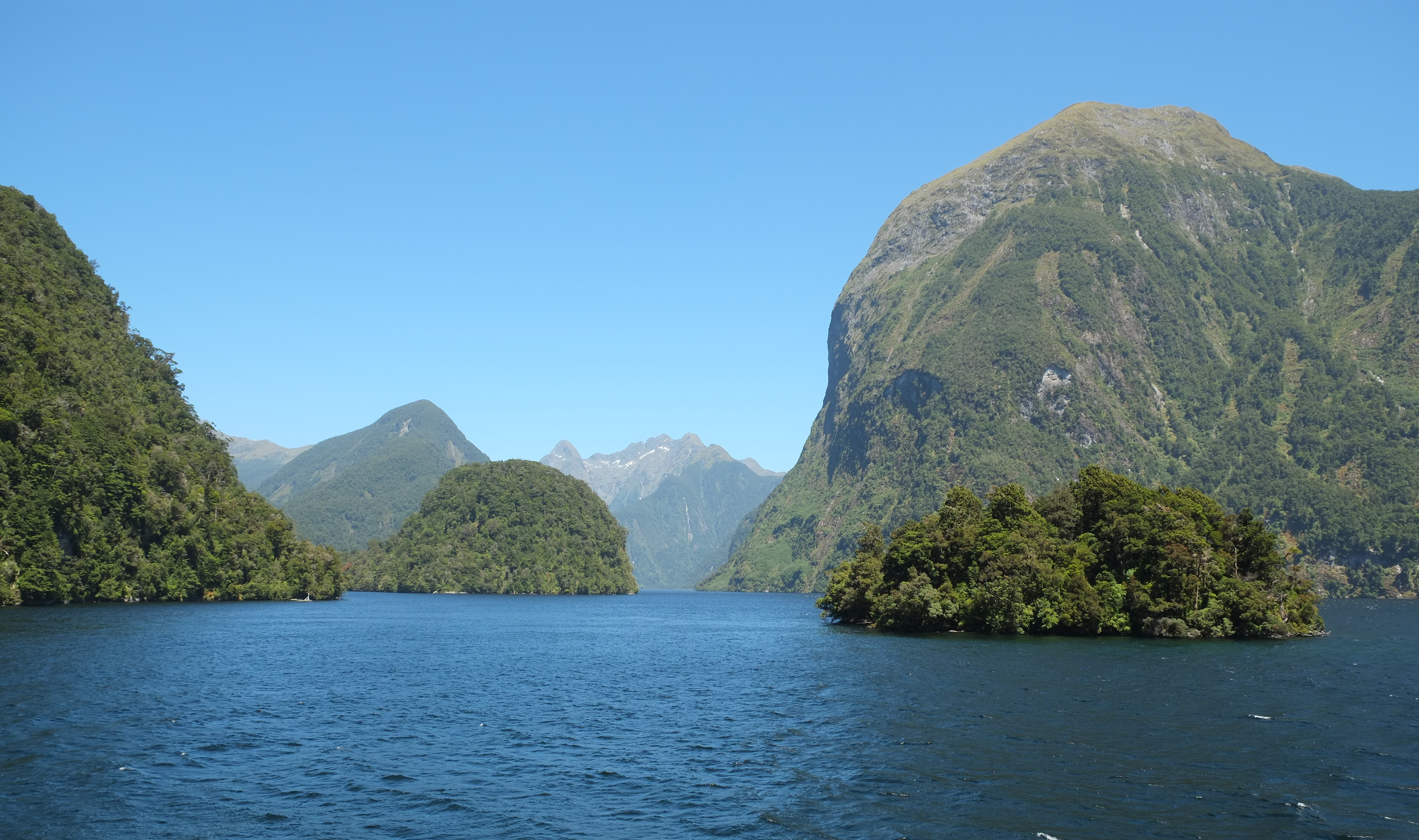
A fjord in Fiordland

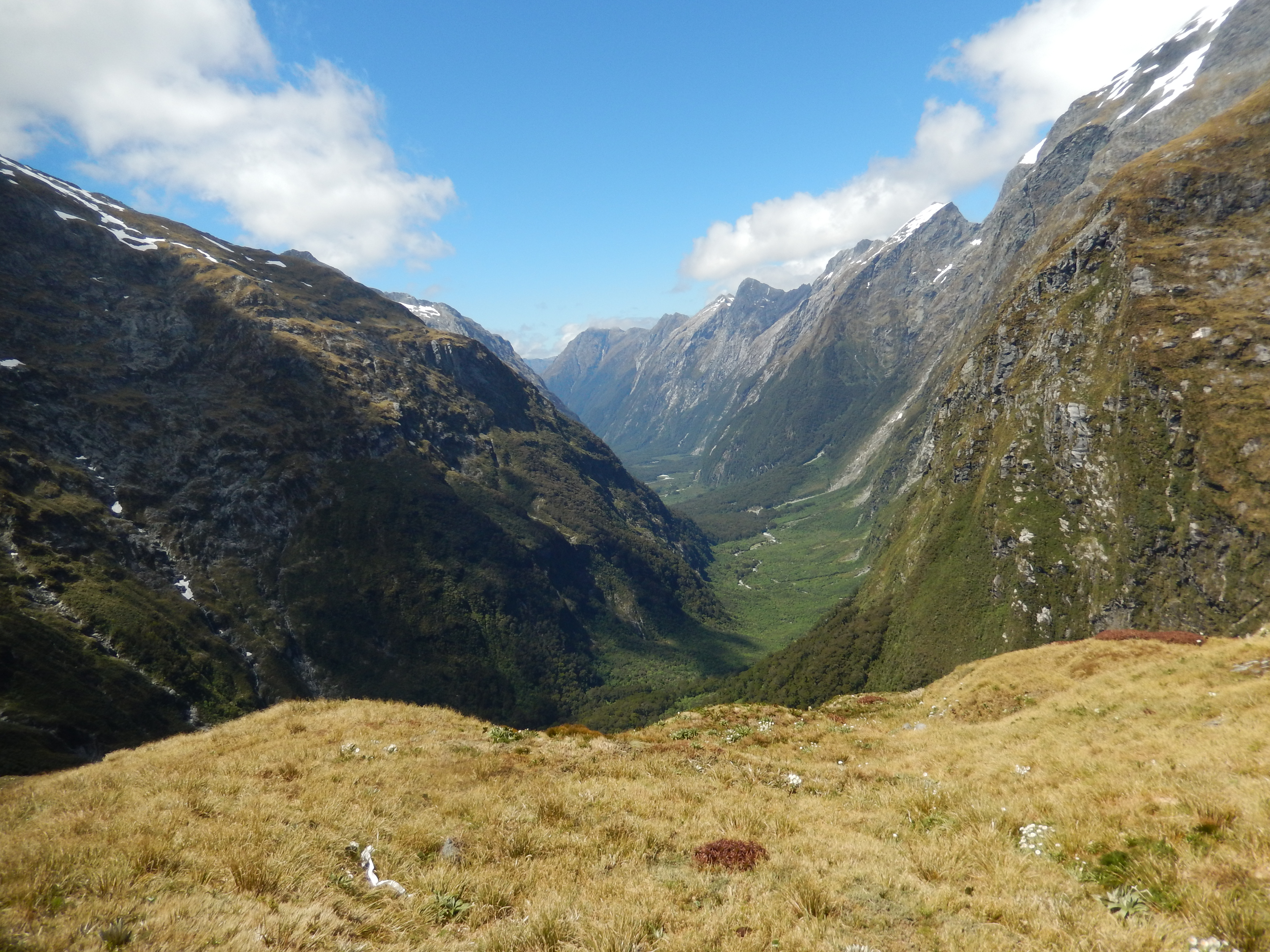
A valley in Fiordland

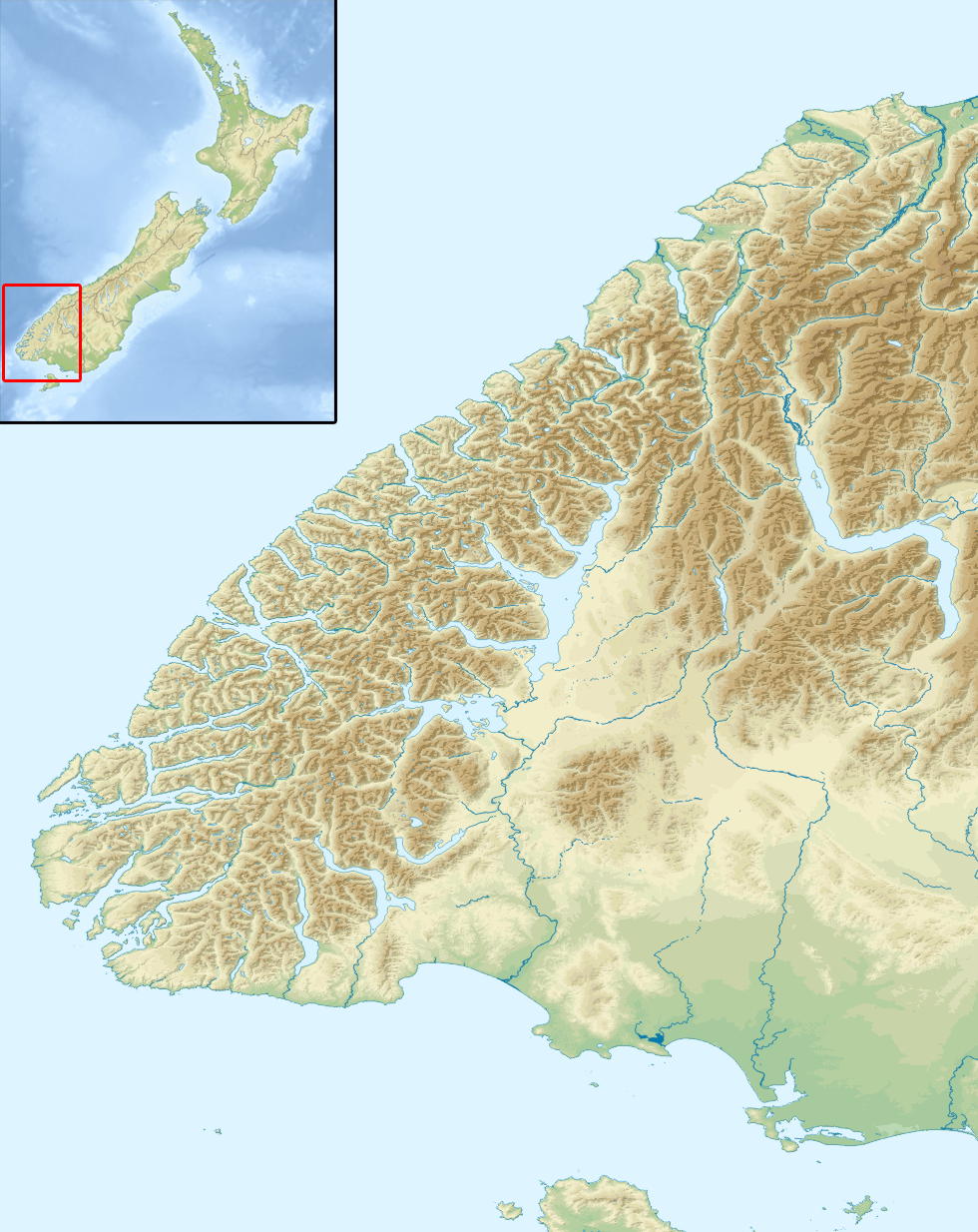
Topographical map of Fiordland

Fiordland (Māori: Te Rua-o-te-Moko, "The Pit of Tattooing", and also translated as "the Shadowlands") is a non-administrative geographical region of New Zealand in the south-western corner of the South Island, comprising the western third of Southland. Most of Fiordland is dominated by the steep sides of the snow-capped Southern Alps, deep lakes, and its steep, glacier-carved and now ocean-flooded western valleys. The name "Fiordland" derives from the New Zealand English spelling of the Scandinavian word for steep glacial valleys, "fjord". The geographic area of Fiordland is dominated by, and roughly coterminous with, Fiordland National Park, New Zealand's largest national park.

Due to the often steep terrain and high amount of rainfall supporting dense vegetation, the interior of the Fiordland region is largely inaccessible. As a result, Fiordland was never subjected to notable logging operations, and even attempts at whaling, seal hunting, and mining were on a small scale and short-lived, partly also because of the challenging weather. Today, Fiordland contains by far the greatest extent of unmodified vegetation in New Zealand and significant populations of endemic plants and threatened animals, in some cases the only remaining wild populations.

Fiordland features a number of fiords, which in this area are typically named sounds, reflecting the fact that sometimes fiords are considered to be a type of narrow sound. Of the twelve major fiords on Fiordland's west coast, Milford Sound / Piopiotahi is the most famous and the only one accessible by road. Doubtful Sound / Patea, which is much larger, is also a tourist destination, but is less accessible as it requires both a boat trip over Lake Manapouri and bus transfer over Wilmot Pass.

Also situated within Fiordland are Browne Falls and Sutherland Falls, which rank among the tallest waterfalls in the world, and New Zealand's three deepest lakes, Lake Hauroko, Lake Manapouri, and Lake Te Anau. Several other large lakes lie nearby, and Fiordland and the surrounding parts of Southland and Otago Regions are often referred to as the Southern Lakes. Only a handful of Fiordland's lakes are accessible by road – Lake Poteriteri is the largest lake in New Zealand with no road access. Many of the region's lakes are not even accessible via tramping tracks.

This part of New Zealand, especially to the west of the mountain divide of the Southern Alps, has a very wet climate with annual average of 200 rainy days and annual rainfall varying from 1,200 millimetres (47 in) in Te Anau to 8,000 millimetres (310 in) in Milford Sound. The prevailing westerly winds blow moist air from the Tasman Sea onto the mountains, resulting in high amounts of precipitation as the air rises and cools down.

== History ==
Fiordland has never had any significant permanent population. Māori knew the area well but only visited seasonally, for hunting, fishing and to collect the precious stone pounamu (New Zealand jade) from Anita Bay at the mouth of Milford Sound / Piopiotahi. In Māori mythology, Fiordland is described as being created by the demigod Tū-te-raki-whānoa, who carved the fiords from rock using his adze. As he moved northwards, he perfected his techniques, and considered the last fiord, Milford Sound / Piopiotahi, his greatest achievement.

The name Te Rua-o-te-Moko ("The Pit of Tattooing") is a reference to the visit of the Tākitimu migratory waka to the area. Traditional histories recall the captain of the waka, Tamatea, lost his tattooing ink in Taiari / Chalky Inlet. After the Tākitimu was wrecked at Te Waewae Bay, the crew decided to walk overland to the north of the South Island. While stopping at Te Anau, Tamatea decided to dig a pit where wood could be burnt to create soot for tattoo ink. Over time, the name grew to refer to the wider Fiordland area.

In 1770, Captain James Cook and his crew became the first Europeans to sight Fiordland. Cook returned and anchored in Tamatea / Dusky Sound for five weeks in 1773. The expeditions' maps and descriptions of the area attracted whalers and seal hunters, but only in the mid-19th century did surveyors and prospectors begin exploring Fiordland's interior.

Between 1897 and 1908, two attempts at establishing a mining operation in the remote area of Rakituma / Preservation Inlet failed, and by 1914 the isolated small settlement of Cromartie (or Cromarty) there had been abandoned.

The area was administered as Fiord County from 1876 until it was absorbed into neighbouring Wallace County in 1981. Since 1989, it has formed part of Southland District and of the wider Southland Region.

== Boundaries ==
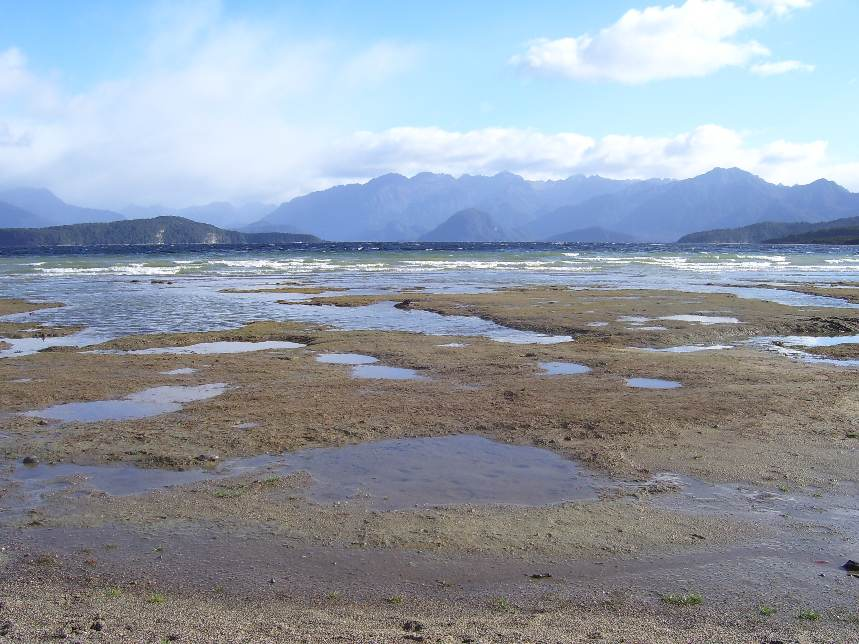
Fraser Beach on the eastern shore of Lake Manapouri

There are currently varying definitions for the boundary of the Fiordland region. The eastern boundary of Fiordland according to Statistics New Zealand stretches from Sand Hill Point on the western end of Te Waewae Bay more or less straight north, cutting through Lakes Hauroko, Monowai, Manapouri, and the South Fiord of Lake Te Anau, before veering northwest and ending with the southern side of Te Houhou / George Sound. By that definition, the Fiordland region is almost entirely within the Fiordland National Park, except for small pockets near the two southernmost lakes, but the area does not include the three northernmost fiords (Milford Sound / Piopiotahi, Te Hāpua / Sutherland Sound, and Hāwea / Bligh Sound).

The much more widespread definition of "Fiordland" has an eastern boundary that roughly follows that of the Fiordland National Park for all but the northernmost end. This area contains all the fiords as well as the Hollyford Valley and also includes the area around Big Bay, which lies to the north outside of the Fiordland National Park, but still belongs to the Southland Region. Tourism organisations and the Department of Conservation use this definition of the Fiordland region. New Zealanders generally regard the towns of Te Anau and Manapouri as part of the Fiordland region, even though they lie outside of the boundary of the national park.

== Geography ==
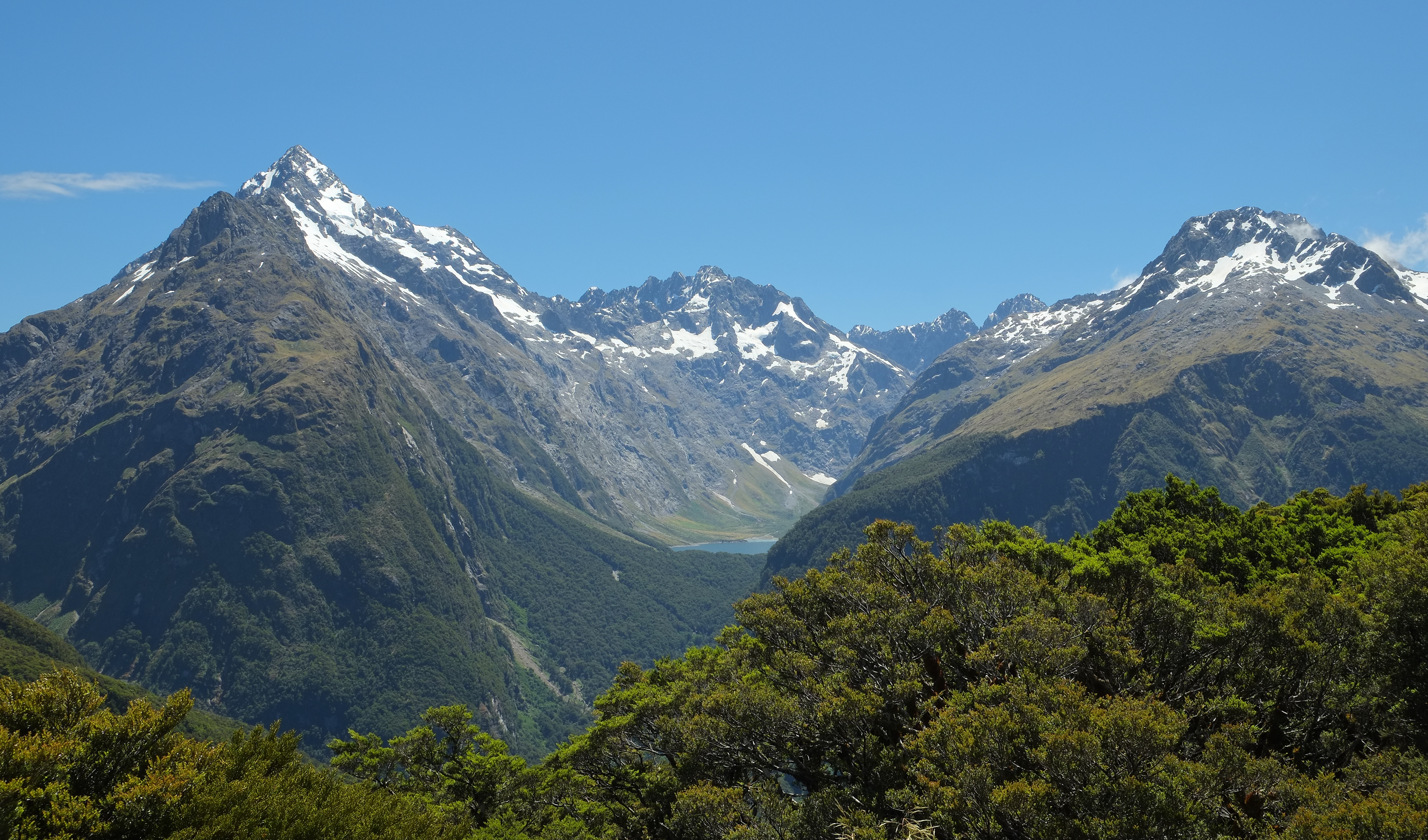
Mountains reach over 2,500 m (8,200 ft) in the northern parts of Fiordland

In geographical terms, the Fiordland region contains the huge mountainous regions west of the line from Te Waewae Bay to Monowai to Te Anau, and includes the valleys of the Eglinton River and Hollyford River / Whakatipu Kā Tuka. The area is almost identical to that of the Fiordland National Park, and is marked by U-shaped valleys and fiords along the coast and steep mountains with foundations of hard rocks like gneiss, schist, granite and diorite, with the softer rock having been carved out by multiple glaciations. Fiordland contains New Zealand's oldest known plutonic (igneous) rocks and is dominated by the southernmost extent of the Southern Alps, as the peaks reduce in height from north to south.

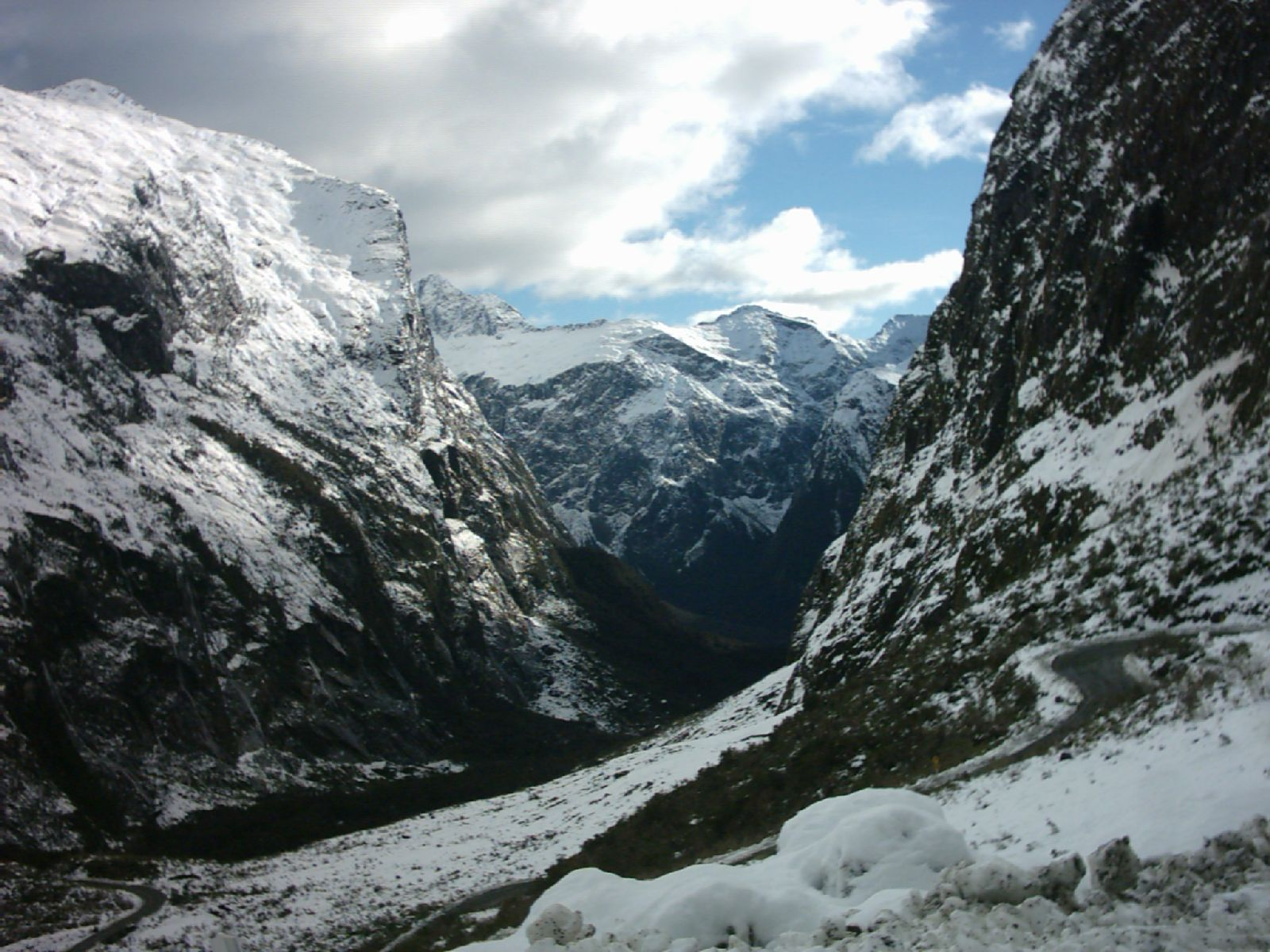
Snow in Fiordland

The tallest mountain in the Fiordland region is Mount Tūtoko at 2,723 metres (8,934 ft), one of several peaks over 2,000 metres in the Darran Mountains. Southeast of this area, there are only a handful of peaks reaching 2,000 metres, however due to the rainy weather with cold winters and lack of hot summer temperatures, even these mountains contain glaciers and peaks with permanent snow cover. The southernmost glacier is situated on Caroline Peak, which only reaches 1,704 metres (5,591 ft), and in the southwest of Fiordland the altitude for permanent snowfields lowers to under 1,500 metres (4,900 ft).

The past glaciation's deep carving out of the landscape has also resulted in fiord-like arms in Lake Manapouri and Lake Te Anau, and on the coast managed to cause several large chunks of the mainland becoming cut off. The largest of these uninhabited offshore islands are Resolution Island and Secretary Island, and are important conservation sites, particularly as sanctuaries for endangered native birds.

=== Constituent fiords ===
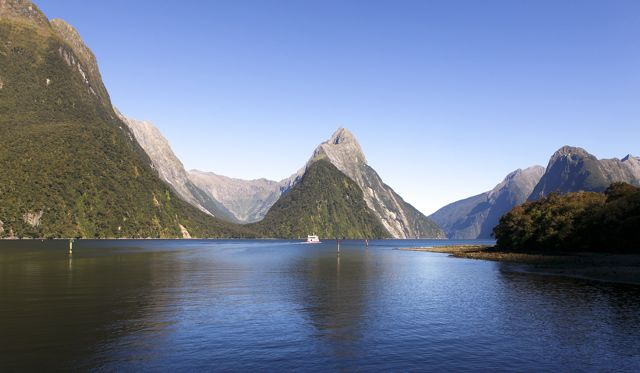
Milford Sound / Piopiotahi, the most famous tourist destination in Fiordland, and the only fiord accessible by road

Twelve fiords, some stretching up to 40 kilometres (25 mi) inland, and two inlets leading to three more fiords, extend along the coast from Piopiotahi in the north to Rakituma / Preservation Inlet in the south. In general, the fiords become wider from north to south as the height of the mountains decreases. The outlets of the southernmost fiords have a character more akin to inlets, with only the inner arms such as Long Sound resembling fiords.

- Milford Sound / Piopiotahi – the only fiord in the area with road access
- Te Hāpua / Sutherland Sound
- Hāwea / Bligh Sound
- Te Houhou / George Sound – accessible via tramping track
- Taitetimu / Caswell Sound
- Taiporoporo / Charles Sound
- Hinenui / Nancy Sound
- Te Awa-o-Tū / Thompson Sound
- Doubtful Sound / Patea – accessible via tours and tramping track
- Te Rā / Dagg Sound
- Te Puaitaha / Breaksea Sound
- Tamatea / Dusky Sound – accessible via tramping track
- Taiari / Chalky Inlet – leads into Edwardson Sound and Kanáris Sound
- Rakituma / Preservation Inlet – leads into Long Sound

A further sound, Kaikiekie / Bradshaw Sound, is basically an extension of Thompson and Doubtful Sounds after their junction at the eastern end of Secretary Island.

== Ecology ==
The area has been categorised as the Fiordland temperate forests ecoregion, having a variety of habitats and, due to its isolation, a high number of endemic plants. Much of Fiordland is heavily forested, except for locations where surface rock exposures are extensive. The natural habitats are almost completely unspoilt. Nothofagus "beech trees" are dominant in many locations, silver beech (Nothofagus menziesii) in the fiords and red beech (Nothofagus fusca) in the inland valleys. In the understory there are a wide variety of shrubs and ferns, including crown fern (Blechnum discolor), areas of scrubby herbs above the treeline, patches of bog next to mountain streams and finally an area of rimu (Dacrydium cupressinum)-dominated dunes in the Waitutu area on the south coast. Despite a latitude in the mid-40s, the treeline is generally below 1,000 metres (3,300 ft) because of the cool summers and the influence of the Southern Ocean on the climate.

The area is home to threatened native bird species, such as the flightless takahē and kiwi, blue duck (whio), and yellowhead (mōhua). The takahē was presumed to have been extinct for 50 years before a small remaining population was discovered in Fiordland's Murchison Mountains in 1948. Since then, that area has been managed by the Department of Conservation, trapping stoats and controlling deer, helping takahē numbers in the area to increase to over 200 and remain at that level.

There are also a high number of insects and one indigenous reptile, the Fiordland skink (Oligosoma acrinasum). There are around 300 insect species endemic to the Fiordland region, many of them sizeable, such as weta, large caddis, and giant weevils, and some of them unusual, such as egg-laying worms, alpine cicadas, and brightly coloured alpine moths. There are six species of native sandflies (blackfly, Simuliidae) with one endemic to Fiordland.

Most of the area falls under the protection of the Fiordland National Park, part of the Te Wahipounamu World Heritage Site. Fiordland National Park has an area of 12,600 square kilometres, making it the largest national park in New Zealand and one of the larger parks in the world, containing many tourist attractions, such as Milford Sound, Doubtful Sound and the Milford Track. The main threat to natural habitats is from introduced species, especially red deer, but these are now being hunted out of the area, and furthermore, the park includes a number of small offshore islands which are free from introduced species and are designated Specially Protected Areas.

=== Marine reserves ===
Ten marine reserves have been established in Fiordland to protect a wide variety of species and habitats.

The original two reserves were established at the request of the New Zealand Federation of Commercial Fishermen in 1993:

- Piopiotahi (Milford Sound) Marine Reserve
- Te Awaatu Channel (The Gut) Marine Reserve

An additional eight reserves were established on the recommendation of Fiordland Marine Guardians in 2005:

- Hawea (Clio Rocks) Marine Reserve
- Kahukura (Gold Arm) Marine Reserve
- Kutu Parera (Gaer Arm) Marine Reserve
- Moana Uta (Wet Jacket Arm) Marine Reserve
- Taipari Roa (Elizabeth Island) Marine Reserve
- Taumoana (Five Fingers Peninsula) Marine Reserve
- Te Hapua (Sutherland Sound) Marine Reserve
- Te Tapuwae o Hua (Long Sound) Marine Reserve

== Demographics and economy ==
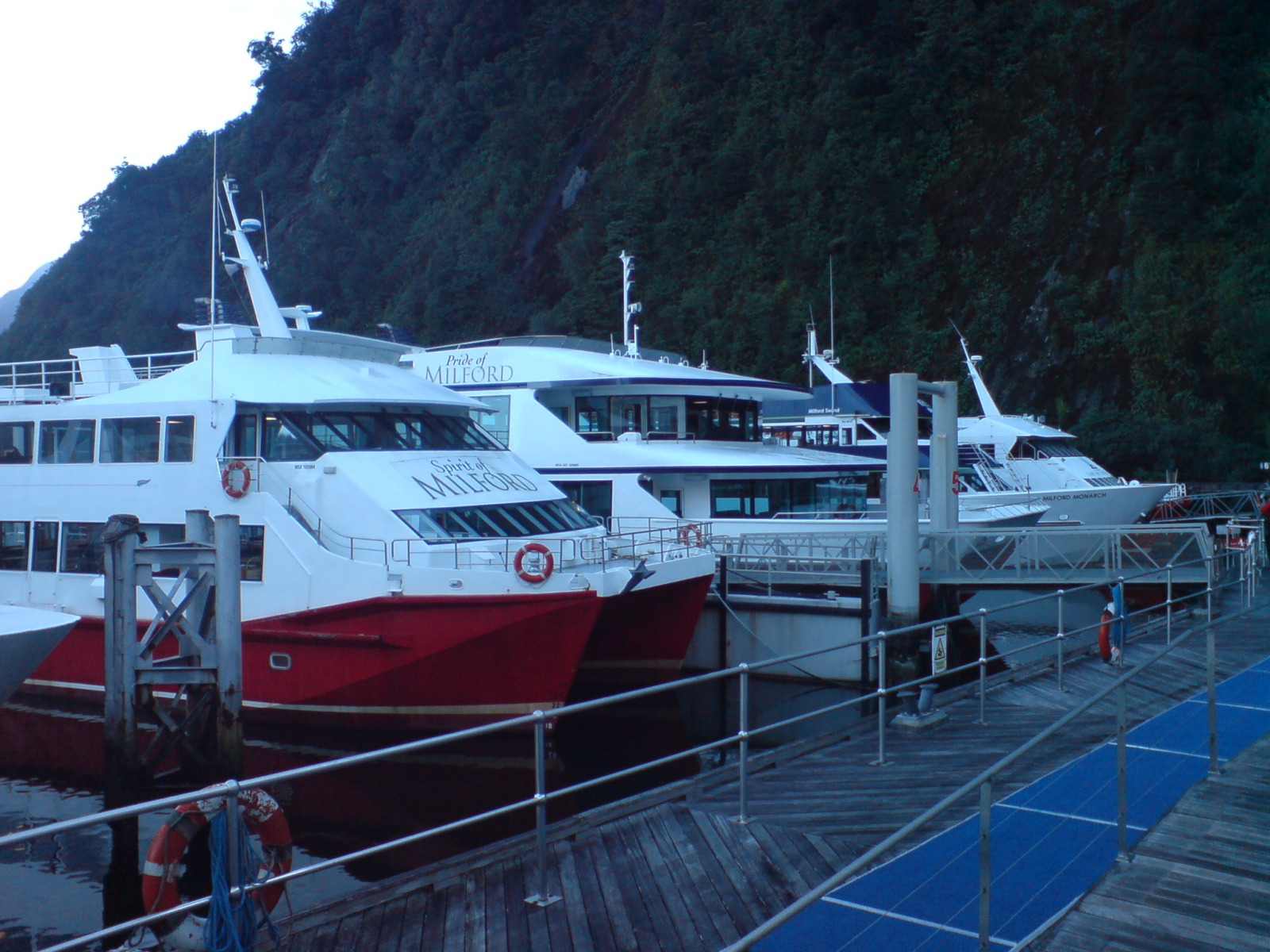
Tour boats at Milford Sound / Piopiotahi

The Fiordland statistical area covers 12,064.68 km^{2} (4,658.20 sq mi) and had an estimated population of 130 as of June 2025, with a population density of 0.011 people per km^{2}. Almost the entire population lives at Milford Sound (village).

Historical population
Year	Pop.	±% p.a.
2006	144	—
2013	123	−2.23%
2018	111	−2.03%

Fiordland had a population of 111 at the 2018 New Zealand census, a decrease of 12 people (−9.8%) since the 2013 census, and a decrease of 33 people (−22.9%) since the 2006 census. There were 3 households, comprising 54 males and 60 females, giving a sex ratio of 0.9 males per female. The median age was 28.2 years (compared with 37.4 years nationally), with 3 people (2.7%) aged under 15 years, 69 (62.2%) aged 15 to 29, 39 (35.1%) aged 30 to 64, and 3 (2.7%) aged 65 or older.

Ethnicities were 73.0% European/Pākehā, 8.1% Māori, 24.3% Asian, and 2.7% other ethnicities. People may identify with more than one ethnicity.

The percentage of people born overseas was 62.2, compared with 27.1% nationally.

Although some people chose not to answer the census's question about religious affiliation, 67.6% had no religion, 21.6% were Christian, 2.7% were Muslim and 5.4% had other religions.

Of those at least 15 years old, 27 (25.0%) people had a bachelor's or higher degree, and 9 (8.3%) people had no formal qualifications. The median income was $34,000, compared with $31,800 nationally. 3 people (2.8%) earned over $70,000 compared to 17.2% nationally. The employment status of those at least 15 was that 102 (94.4%) people were employed full-time, and 3 (2.8%) were part-time.

Apart from the areas around the townships of Te Anau and Manapouri, which are not included in the Fiordland statistical area, the Fiordland region has never had more than a few human inhabitants and is the least-populated area of the South Island, with no villages or towns, and many areas almost inaccessible except by boat or air. The nearest city is Invercargill, about 80 kilometres (50 mi) east of the southern end of Fiordland. The only major road in Fiordland is State Highway 94, also referred to as Milford Road, connecting Te Anau with Milford Sound.

Blanket Bay Hotel, not an actual hotel, may be the westernmost inhabited locality of New Zealand. The fishermen's refuelling and supply depot with a small jetty and helipad is located on a small island at the head of Doubtful Sound / Patea.

Except for electricity generation (at the Manapouri Power Station and a smaller hydroelectric power station at Lake Monowai) and some agriculture, tourism is the only other major economic factor in the region. Visitor spending was NZ$92 million in 2003, and 1,017 people were employed full-time in the tourism industry, with an additional 1,900 people considered to be employed in tourism industry support services. Most tourists visit Milford Sound / Piopiotahi, though walking in the more accessible eastern parts of the alps is a popular activity. Nonetheless, the remoteness of the region limits even tourism, and after short visits to the major sites, most tourists return to other areas, such as Queenstown or Invercargill.

== See also ==
- List of fiords of New Zealand
- List of shipwrecks of Southland#Fiordland
