= List of sounds (geography) =

List of bodies of water called sound is an overview of all waterbodies with sound as part of the name.

== Australia ==
- Broad Sound near Clairview, Queensland
- Camden Sound at Kuri Bay, Western Australia
- Cockburn Sound, Western Australia
- Denham Sound, part of Shark Bay in Western Australia
- King George Sound at Albany, Western Australia
- King Sound at Derby, Western Australia
- Montague Sound, near Bigge Island, Western Australia
- Noosa Sound, Shire of Noosa, Queensland, built in 1970
- York Sound, Western Australia
- Capel Sound, Mornington Peninsula, Victoria

== Antarctic ==
- Antarctic Sound, separates the Joinville Island group from the northeast end of the Antarctic Peninsula.
- Bird Sound
- Lang Sound
- Macfie Sound
- McMurdo Sound, a sound lying at the junction of the Ross Sea
- Peacock Sound
- Stange Sound
- Tryne Sound
- Wilkins Sound

== Arctic ==
- Antarctic Sound, Greenland
- Smith Sound, between Greenland and Canada

== Bahamas ==
- Exuma Sound, bordered by Eleuthera, Cat Island and Great Exuma, among others
- Millars Sound, New Providence
- North Sound, Bimini
- Rock Sound, Eleuthera

== Bermuda ==
- Great Sound, towards the island's northwest end
  - Little Sound, part of Great Sound
- Harrington Sound, towards the northeast end

== British Virgin Islands ==
- North Sound, Virgin Gorda
- South Sound, Virgin Gorda

== Canada ==
- Amet Sound on the northern coast of Nova Scotia on the Northumberland Strait
- Barkley Sound on the west coast of Vancouver Island, British Columbia
- Baynes Sound between Denman Island and Vancouver Island, British Columbia
- Chatham Sound, off the North Coast of British Columbia
- Clayoquot Sound in Vancouver Island, British Columbia
- Cumberland Sound in Baffin Island's east coast
- Desolation Sound between the Discovery Islands and the coast of British Columbia
- Tasiujaq between Baffin Island and Bylot Island in Nunavut
- Eureka Sound between Ellesmere Island and Axel Heiberg Island in Nunavut
- Fitz Hugh Sound on the Central Coast of British Columbia
- Hamilton Sound between Fogo Island and the Island of Newfoundland
- Howe Sound, an inlet northwest of Vancouver, British Columbia
- Jones Sound between Devon Island and Ellesmere Island in Nunavut
- Kyuquot Sound on the west coast of Vancouver Island, British Columbia
- Lancaster Sound between Devon Island and Baffin Island in Nunavut
- Mackenzie Sound in Broughton Archipelago of the Queen Charlotte Strait region
- Massey Sound between Amund Ringnes Island and Axel Heiberg Island in Nunavut
- Nansen Sound between Ellesmere Island and Axel Heiberg Island in Nunavut
- Newman Sound in Terra Nova National Park, Newfoundland and Labrador
- Nootka Sound on the west coast of Vancouver Island, British Columbia
- Northumberland Sound between Maclean Strait and Norwegian Bay, Nunavut
- Owen Sound in Ontario
- Parry Sound in Ontario
- Peel Sound between Prince of Wales Island and Somerset Island in Nunavut
- Quatsino Sound on northern Vancouver Island
- Queen Charlotte Sound off British Columbia
- Random Sound near Clarenville in Newfoundland and Labrador
- Roes Welcome Sound between Southampton Island and Hudson Bay's west shore in Nunavut
- Severn Sound in Ontario
- Viscount Melville Sound between Banks Island and Melville Island in Nunavut

== Cayman Islands ==
- Frank Sound on Grand Cayman
- Little Sound on Grand Cayman
- North Sound on Grand Cayman
- South Hole Sound on Little Cayman
- South Sound on Grand Cayman

== Chile ==
- Almirantazgo Sound
- Darwin Sound in Tierra del Fuego
- Otway Sound between Brunswick Peninsula and Riesco Island
- Reloncaví Sound
- Skyring Sound
- Última Esperanza Sound in the Magallanes Basin

== Falkland Islands ==
- Adventure Sound in East Falkland
- Berkeley Sound in East Falkland
- Byron Sound in West Falkland
- Choiseul Sound in East Falkland
- Falkland Sound between East Falkland and West Falkland

== France ==
- The Sound of Chausey

== Germany ==
- Fehmarn Sound
- Strelasund

== Republic of Ireland ==
- Achill Sound, that separates Achill Island from the mainland
- Dursey Sound, that separates Dursey Island from the mainland
- Ballycotton Sound, that separate the islands from the mainland
- Aran Islands
  - North Sound / An Súnda ó Thuaidh (more accurately Bealach Locha Lurgan) lies between Inishmore and Lettermullen, County Galway.
  - Gregory's Sound / Súnda Ghríoghóra (formerly known as Bealach na h-Áite) lies between Inishmore and Inishmaan.
  - Foul Sound / An Súnda Salach (formerly known as Bealach na Fearbhaighe) lies between Inishmaan and Inisheer.
  - South Sound / An Súnda ó Dheas (formerly known as Bealach na Fínnise) lies between Inisheer and County Clare.

== Mexico ==
- Campeche Sound in Campeche

== New Zealand ==
"The Marlborough Sounds" is a local term for a complex of bays and inlets on the northern tip of the South Island, which comprises three main sounds:

- Kenepuru Sound
- Pelorus Sound / Te Hoiere
- Queen Charlotte Sound / Tōtaranui

Much further south, there are many fiords in the southwestern corner of the South Island incorrectly named as sounds, which collectively make up the coast of Fiordland National Park. From north to south, they are:

- Piopiotahi / Milford Sound
- Te Hāpua / Sutherland Sound
- Hāwea / Bligh Sound
- Te Houhou / George Sound
- Taitetimu / Caswell Sound
- Taiporoporo / Charles Sound
- Hinenui / Nancy Sound
- Te Awa-o-Tū / Thompson Sound
- Kaikiekie / Bradshaw Sound
- Doubtful Sound / Patea
- Te Rā / Dagg Sound
- Te Puaitaha / Breaksea Sound
- Tamatea / Dusky Sound
- Moana-whenua-pōuri / Edwardson Sound (an arm of Taiari / Chalky Inlet)
- Te Korowhakaunu / Kanáris Sound (an arm of Taiari / Chalky Inlet)
- Isthmus Sound (an arm of Rakituma / Preservation Inlet)
- Te Awaroa / Long Sound (an extension of Rakituma / Preservation Inlet)

== Philippines ==
- Casiguran Sound, in Aurora (province)
- Dinagat Sound, separates the islands of Dinagat and Siargao
- Malampaya Sound, in the Province of Palawan

== Scandinavia ==
- On the coasts of the (western) Baltic Sea and Norway there are more than a hundred straits named "Sund" (the Scandinavian and German version of "sound"), mostly in connection with the name of the island they divide from the continent or a mainland.
- Alssund, strait between Als and Jutland in Denmark
- Drøbak Sound, separates the Norwegian cities of Drøbak and Hurum in the Oslofjord
- Prince Christian Sound in Southern Greenland
- Scoresby Sound, a fjord system on the eastern coast of Greenland
- Svendborgsund, strait separating the islands of Funen and Tåsinge in Denmark
- Øresund, sometimes translated into English as the Sound, a body of water between Sweden and Denmark

== Solomon Islands ==
- New Georgia Sound in the New Georgia Islands region

== United Kingdom ==
- Calf Sound between the Isle of Man and the Calf of Man
- Heigham Sound, connected by Candle Dyke to the River Thurne, Norfolk
- Plymouth Sound in Plymouth, Devon

== United States ==
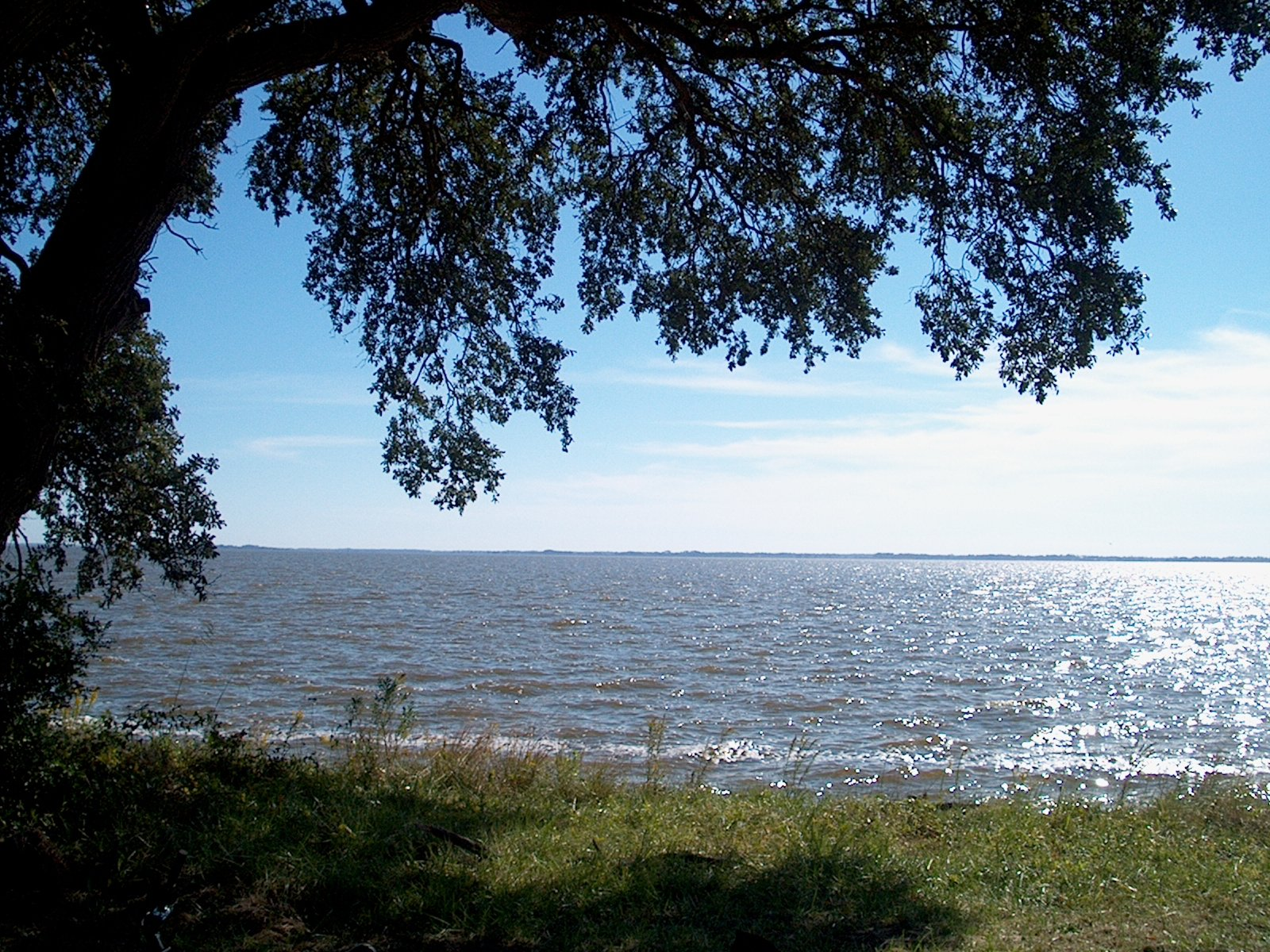
A live oak on Knotts Island, North Carolina, overlooks Currituck Sound

- Albemarle Sound in North Carolina
- Anna Maria Sound in Florida
- Back Sound in eastern North Carolina
- Block Island Sound between Block Island and mainland Rhode Island
- Bogue Sound in North Carolina
- Breton Sound in Louisiana
- Broad Sound near Boston, Massachusetts
- Calibogue Sound in South Carolina
- Chandeleur Sound between mainland Louisiana and the Chandeleur Islands
- Core Sound between the mainland of North Carolina and Core Banks
- Croatan Sound in Dare County, North Carolina
- Cross Sound in Alaska
- Currituck Sound in North Carolina and Virginia
- Frederick Sound in the Alexander Archipelago in Southeast Alaska
- Fishers Island Sound between Fishers Island, New York and Connecticut
- Hobe Sound in Florida
- Kotzebue Sound in Alaska
- Long Island Sound between Long Island, New York and Connecticut
- Mississippi Sound in Mississippi and Alabama
- Nantucket Sound off Nantucket, Massachusetts
- Norton Sound in Alaska
- Ossabaw Sound near Savannah, Georgia
- Pamlico Sound in North Carolina
- Pine Island Sound near Cape Coral, Florida
- Plum Island Sound in Plum Island, Massachusetts
- Port Royal Sound in Beaufort County, South Carolina
- Prince William Sound in Alaska
- Puget Sound in Washington
- Rhode Island Sound off Rhode Island
- Roanoke Sound in North Carolina
- St. Catherine's Sound in Liberty County, Georgia
- Saint Helena Sound near Beaufort, South Carolina
- Salem Sound near Salem, Massachusetts
- St. George Sound in Appalachicola Bay, Florida
- St. Simons Sound in Glynn County, Georgia
- Salisbury Sound in the Alexander Archipelago in Southeast Alaska
- Santa Rosa Sound in the Florida Panhandle
- Sitka Sound near Sitka, Alaska
- Somes Sound in Mount Desert Island, Maine (arguably a fjard)
- Tangier Sound in Maryland & Virginia on Chesapeake Bay
- Vineyard Sound off Martha's Vineyard, Massachusetts
- Wassaw Sound near Savannah, Georgia

=== United States Virgin Islands ===
- Pillsbury Sound between Saint Thomas and Saint John
