= Grono =

Grono may refer to:

== Places ==
- Grono, Switzerland, municipality in Graubünden
- Mount Grono

== Other uses ==
- Grono (surname)
- Grono.net, social networking website in Poland
