= Wild Natives River =

River in New Zealand

- Route of the Wild Natives River
- Mouth of the Wild Natives River Wild Natives River (South Island)

Location
- Country: New Zealand

Physical characteristics
- Source: Franklin Mountains
  - coordinates: 44°55′15″S 167°39′04″E
- Mouth
  - location: Hāwea / Bligh Sound
  - coordinates: 44°52′45″S 167°32′03″E

Basin features
- Progression: Wild Natives River → Hāwea / Bligh Sound → Tasman Sea
- Tributaries
  - left: Pitt River
  - right: Bernard Burn

The Wild Natives River is a river in Fiordland, New Zealand. It rises in the Franklin Mountains near Worsley Pass and flows westward into Hāwea / Bligh Sound.

== See also ==
- List of rivers of New Zealand
