= Franklin Mountains =

Franklin Mountains may refer to:

- Franklin Mountains (Northwest Territories), Canada
- Franklin Mountains (New Zealand)
- Franklin Mountains (Alaska), United States
- Franklin Mountains (Texas), United States
  - Franklin Mountains State Park
