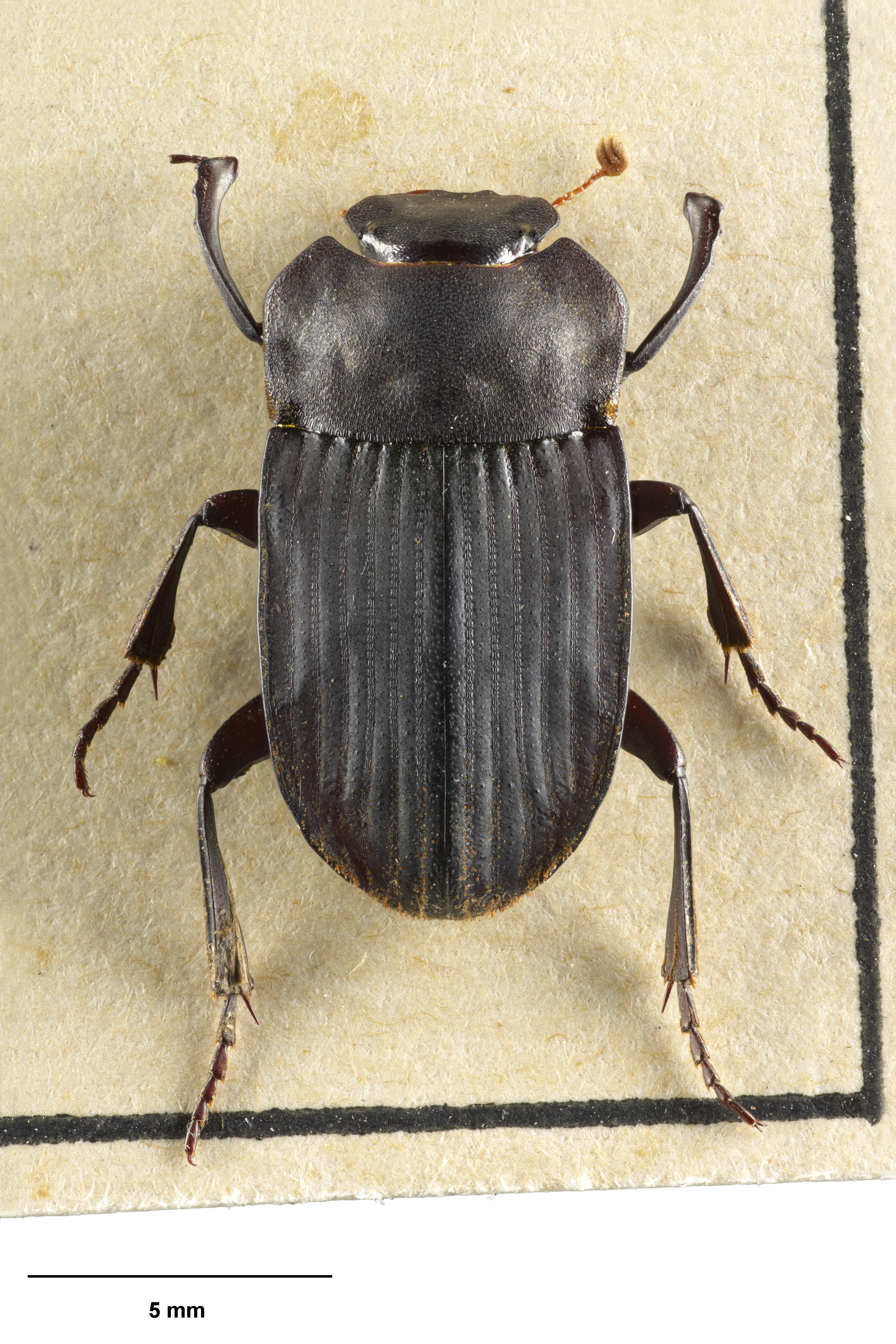

Scientific classification
- Domain: Eukaryota
- Kingdom: Animalia
- Phylum: Arthropoda
- Class: Insecta
- Order: Coleoptera
- Suborder: Polyphaga
- Infraorder: Scarabaeiformia
- Family: Scarabaeidae
- Genus: Saphobiamorpha
- Species: S. maoriana

Binomial name
- Saphobiamorpha maoriana Brookes, 1944

= Saphobiamorpha maoriana =

Species of insect

Saphobiamorpha maoriana is a species of beetle endemic to New Zealand. It was first described by Albert E. Brookes in 1944. It has been collected in the Westland District and in Fiordland.

== Taxonomy ==
This species was first described by Albert Brookes in 1944 using specimens collected from a Kea carcass in high country tussock adjoining native forest. The holotype specimen is held at Te Papa.

== Description ==
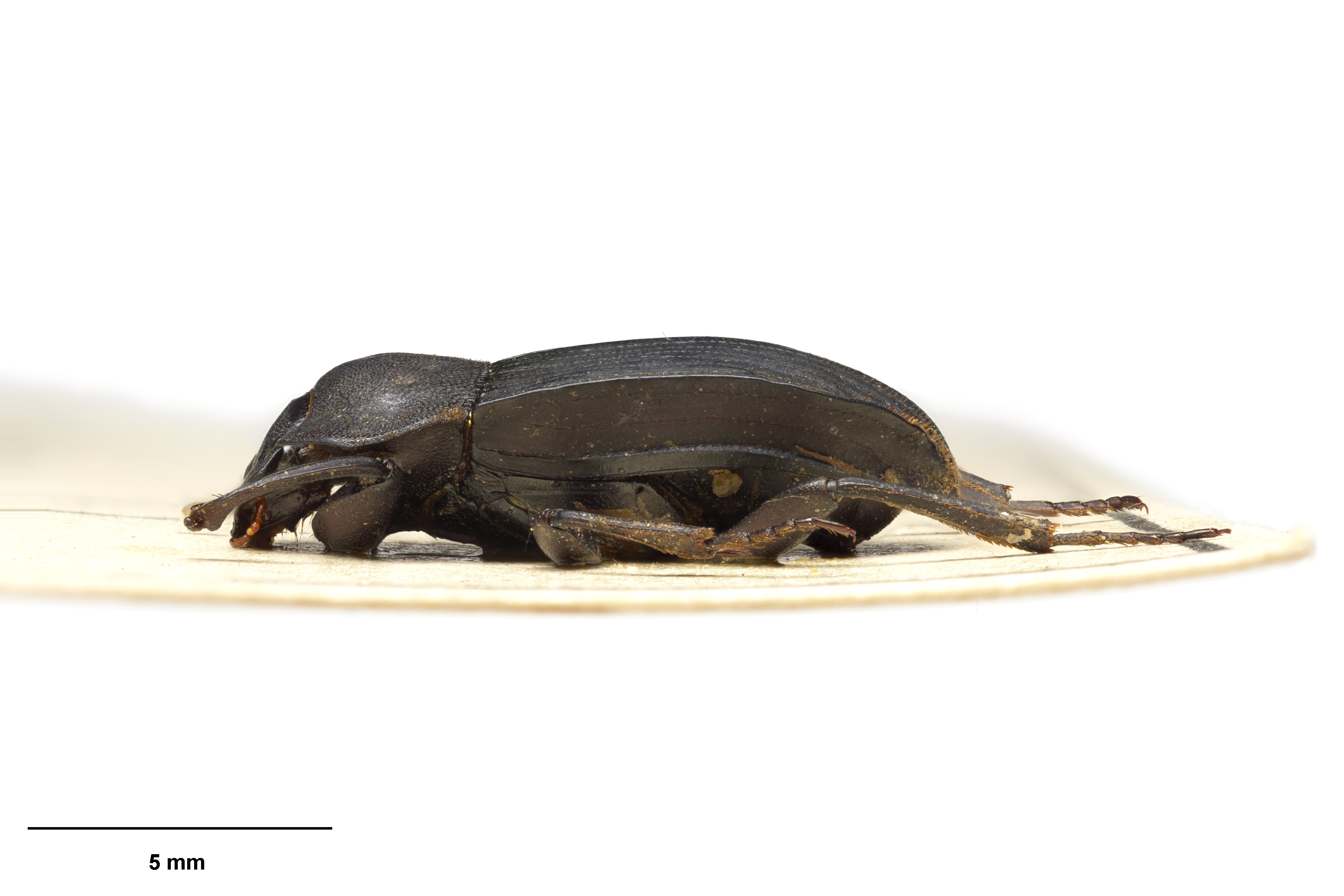
Image showing the flattened elytra.

Brookes described this species as follows:

Dull blackish-brown, elongate, antennae and palpi fulvus, anterior and last joints of intermediate and posterior tarsi piceorufous. Head widest just in front of eyes, where it is roundly angulate and flatly depressed, obliquely narrowed in front and behind, clypeus emarginate, depressed, forming distinct angles with the sides, base rounded, whole surface finely rugosely punctate.

The adults of this species is flightless and have a length of 13 mm. They are black in colour. The elytra is flattened and slightly convex.

== Distribution ==
This species is endemic in New Zealand and as well as being observed in Westland, this species has also been observed at Secretary Island in Fiordland. As at 2002, this species has yet to be found in modified habitats.
