= Royal William =

"Royal William" can refer to

- Royal William, a 32-gun fifth rate ship of the Royal Scottish Navy, renamed HMS Edinburgh in 1707 following the Act of Union, and sunk in 1709
- HMS Royal William, two ships of the Royal Navy
- SS Royal William, Canadian ship launched in 1831 and the first ship that crossed the Atlantic Ocean almost continually under steam power 1833. (Later sold to the Spanish Navy)
- Royal William rose, a red hybrid tea rose, registered in 1984 by the German rose firm Wilhelm Kordes
