= Elizabeth River =

Elizabeth River may refer to:

- Elizabeth River (New Jersey), a tributary of the Arthur Kill
- Elizabeth River (Virginia), an estuary of Chesapeake Bay
- Elizabeth River (New Zealand), a river in Fiordland
- Elizabeth River (Northern Territory), a river near Darwin in the Northern Territory
- Elizabeth River (Tasmania), a tributary of the Macquarie River
