= John Grono =

Australian settler (1763–1847)

John Grono (c. 1763 – 4 May 1847) was a settler, sailor, ship builder, ship captain, sealer, whaler and farmer who migrated to Australia in 1799 from Wales. Captaining the ship Governor Bligh, he would later go on to be the first European to fully explore and name parts of the southwestern coast of New Zealand's south island including Milford Sound, Bligh Sound and Elizabeth Island.

== Early life and arrival in Australia ==
Very little is known of Grono's life prior to his migration to Australia. He was born in Newport, Pembrokeshire, Wales around 1767. Navy records show Grono was involved in a number of navy operations beginning in 1790 when he entered HMS Royal William as an able seaman (AB), suggesting he was already an experienced sailor at this time. He was married to Elisabeth Bristowe on 20 July 1790 in Surrey, England. By 1793 he was promoted to the rank of boatswain's mate.

On 7 January 1798 Grono joined the crew of HMS Buffalo as an AB and later that year was again promoted to boatswain's mate. On this ship, John, his wife Elisabeth and his three children travelled to Australia, arriving in New South Wales on 4 May 1799. That year he was transferred from HMS Buffalo to Colonial Vessel Francis (the first vessel built in Australia), where he served as First Officer.

By mid-1801 he had left the colonial vessels and gone into a farming partnership with James Ryan.

== Ambitious new careers ==
John Grono and his wife Elisabeth Bristowe along with their young family took up land on the Hawkesbury River north of Sydney, where they grew wheat.

In November 1803, an ugly incident occurred. "On Tuesday last John Wilkinson and Wm. Pendle were examined before Richard Atkins, Esq. Judge Advocate, on a charge of violently assaulting an infant daughter of John Grono; but the most material witnesses being resident at Hawkesbury, where the offence was committed, the business was necessarily referred to the Magistrate of that Settlement."

As it transpired, neither Wilkinson nor Pendle were the offenders. The Sydney Gazette and New South Wales Advertiser (SG&NSWA) of Sunday 25 March 1804 said "Hen. Wright was shortly since convicted of a violent assault upon an infant, and it being his third heinous offence received a severe corporal punishment, and a sentence of three years hard labour for the Crown, during the whole term to be exposed in the stocks for the space of two hours upon every Saturday. Such is the nature of the crime, that the miscreant is precluded from every hope of commiseration, and lives the object of reproach and scorn."

In October 1804, his schooner Speedwell (which had only been registered on 3 February 1804 ), became stuck in a creek near Mount Elliot and Lion Island. She was thought to be lost and was sold to Andrew Thompson by late November of that year.

Andrew Thompson was the master and/or owner of several ships in NSW in the years 1802–1807. Some of his ships (and the years in which they were registered) were the Hope, (1802); Hawkesbury, (1804); Hope of Hawkesbury; Nancy, and, in 1807, the Governor Bligh. Andrew died in 1810 at the age of 37, and his effects were auctioned in February 1811:

Within a month of the sale of the Speedwell, and probably as a consequence of the loss of the ship, John was heading for financial strife; he owed money. He was included in a list of people on the Hawkesbury from whom the provost marshal, George Blaxcell, intended to seize and sell their assets unless the claims had been met before Monday, 28 January 1805.

Perhaps as a means of rescuing his financial position, and calling on the skills of his past, he commenced undertaking seafaring voyages, hunting seal furs in the waters off the southern end of New Zealand.

In July 1805, his intended departure 'for the Southward', as John Grono (master), with John Robinson, John Brown, George Lisk, John Connor, Nicholas Dukes, Charles Fever, William Carswell, Thomas McCabe, John Wade, Edward Dunn, Evan Evans, Abraham Moseley and Samuel Symmonds, was reported. The ship was not named in that notice.

John's association with the Governor Bligh was first published in 'The Sydney Gazette and New South Wales Advertiser' (SG&NSWA) of Sunday, 12 March 1809, page 1.

On Sunday 16 April 1809, the following notice was printed on page 2 in the SG&NSWA: 'John Grono cautions the Public against receiving in payment a Promissory Note of Hand drawn by me the said John Grono in behalf of Daniel Fane, about 5 or 6 years since, for £20 10s. the same having been duly discharged, but said to be mislaid at the time; when a Receipt was taken for the amount, which is in the hands of my Wife at Hawkesbury. Signed by me-John Grono.'

The huge sum of money involved may relate to wages paid to a crew member or a business dealing, which dated back to the 1803 to 1804 period. This coincides with the voyages of the Speedwell.

On Saturday, 10 March 1810, John was the master of the Colonial Schooner Unity. He was recruiting "active sealers and seamen".

John acquired a crew of fourteen men, being John Stuart, Evan Evans, Henry Branch, James McNathy, W. Needham, Thomas Hambleton, Gilbert Grant, Thomas Arnett, Charles Chambers, Robert Jones, James Hutton, James Mooney, Michael Murphy and John Thorn. They announced their intended departure on the Unity in the SG&NSWA of Saturday 24 March 1810, page 2.

On 18 August 1810, the Unity returned to Sydney for provisions, a re-fit and to unload her cargo of "about 6000 fur seal skins", under Captain Cooper, rather than John Grono.

John returned to the Governor Bligh as its captain by early 1811. He was on a voyage in that ship to Port Dalrymple which returned to Sydney on 24 April of that year, and sailed from Sydney on or about 3 May 1811 "for the Islands of Campbell and Macquarie" on another seal fur trip.

In subsequent years, John was to build several ships on the Hawkesbury. His involvement in ship-owning, -building and sailing over the years saw him become one of the earliest European visitors to the south-west coast and Canterbury region of New Zealand. Of this area Sir Joseph Banks had earlier written: "The southern part of New Zealand [produces] seals of all kinds in quantities at present almost innumerable". The seal rush was on and Captain Grono, ever the capitalist, sought to profit from the immense seal and whale populations in these southern waters.

== New Zealand adventures ==
Grono's exploits in the Fiordland region of New Zealand began when the Governor Bligh struck a rock in Foveaux Strait in 1809. Grono was able to save the ship and safely made it back to Sydney with a cargo of over 10,000 seal skins, along with one of the earliest descriptions of Foveaux Strait, recording the name in print for the first time ever. At the same time he also named Windsor Point after the town where the Governor Bligh was built on the Hawkesbury River.

A second sealing voyage across the Tasman took place in April of the same year, returning to Sydney nine months later with another 10,000 skins. On this voyage, Grono and his crew entered Doubtful Sound, the first known visit for 16 years, when it was discovered and explored by Don Felipe Bauza, who mistakenly assumed it was a part of Dusky Bay when he investigated the area in a longboat. Grono solved this confusion and proved it to be a northern outlet from the sound to the sea. Grono set up a base in a cove on the south coast of Secretary Island; the site is still known as Grono Bay. The Highest peak on Secretary Island is named Mount Grono, and at least one old chart names the sound itself "Gronow's" instead of "Doubtful". In the upper sound lies Elizabeth Island, which Grono named for his wife. At some point, presumably towards the end of this voyage, Grono sailed north to have at least a preliminary look at the sounds there. It is thought in this time he named Bligh Sound after his neighbour in Australia, the former governor of New South Wales, from whom his ship also took her name. Grono also named Milford Sound after Milford Haven in Wales. Nancy Sound and Caswell Sound, and Milford Sound's Cleddau River have also been traced back to the Welsh Captain who had become the first to explore this area to this extent.

In 1813, Grono again returned with a cargo of 14,000 seal pelts as well as ten stranded sealers who he rescued from Open Bay Islands. The survivors had been left on the island by the ill-fated ship The Active, which sailed away and was never heard from again. The men survived for three years on a diet of seal meat and ferns. Convinced the sealers were escaped convicts and despite their protests he took them back to Sydney to the chains. He later learnt of their innocence and was overcome with remorse, giving two of the men, Alexander Books and Robert Mckenzie, employment. The two men would go on to become Grono's sons-in-law. The tale of the stranded sealers is recounted in the New Zealand folk song Davy Lowston.

He acquired a hotel known as the "Kings Arms" situated at the corner at No.1 Bligh Street, Sydney, which he sold to William Roberts on 3 January 1818 for 2,000 pounds. This money no doubt launched the captain on his ship building programme the same year with the construction of the "Elizabeth".

After some time away from the ocean working on his farm, Grono made at least two more trips to Fiordland in his newly launched vessel the Elisabeth, named for his wife. In May 1824 he arrived in Sydney with 5,300 skins and on this, the conclusion of his last voyage, handed the command of the Elisabeth over to his rescued son-in-law Alexander Books. Books kept up the family tradition returning from Dusky Bay in 1825 with 3,000 seal skins on board.

Grono remained an authority on the Canterbury region of New Zealand and its many islands, bays and sounds. When Captain Dumont D'Urville arrived in Sydney in 1824, it was Grono that supplied his cartographer with detailed information for the first coastal descriptions of the Fiordland coast, as well as direct sailing directions for Milford Sound.

== Life on dry land ==
After retiring from his New Zealand maritime adventures, Grono set to expanding his ship building and farming enterprises. He and son William built and launched numerous vessels on the Hawkesbury River, one of which the Bennelong (later renamed the Australian), was larger than any ship built on the river by 100 tonnes.

Grono claimed to have built seven ships in his lifetime, some of which were the biggest the colony had seen. Four of the ships that can be traced directly to Grono's Hawkesbury shipyard are Elizabeth (84 tons), 1821; Industry (87 tons), 1826; Australian (270 tons), 1829; and Governor Bourke (200 tons), 1833. Grono also owned the following vessels Speedwell, Unity, Governor Bligh, and Branch.

Shipbuilding went on to become the passion of Grono's eldest son, William. William's meticulously kept journal provides an insight to the methods of ship building in that period and area. William Grono went on to build the vessel the Esther Maria which spent her life sailing the east coast of Australia as a cargo ship.

== Death ==
John Grono died on 4 May 1847. He was approximately 80. His wife Elisabeth died fourteen months later at age 77. They were survived by nine children. The couple are buried at the entrance to Ebenezer Church, New South Wales. The couple themselves had played a pivotal role in the development and construction of this church, the third church to be built in the Australian colony, and the oldest church to still exist today.

== See also ==
- Mount Grono – mountain named for John Grono
