= Light River =

Light River may refer to:

- Light River (South Australia), a river across the Adelaide Plains
- Light River (New Zealand) in Fiordland

== See also ==
- Strike-a-Light River
- Light (disambiguation)
