= Dark River =

Dark River or The Dark River may refer to:

== Geography ==
- Dark River (Minnesota), a river in Minnesota, U.S.
- Dark River, Minnesota, an unorganized territory in Minnesota, U.S.
- Dark River, New Zealand, a river in New Zealand

== Art and entertainment ==
- Dark River (1952 film) (Las aguas bajan turbias), an Argentine drama
- Dark River (1990 film), a British TV drama
- Dark River (2017 film), a British drama
- Dark River, a 2007 novel in the Warriors: Power of Three series by Erin Hunter
- The Dark River (novel), a novel by John Twelve Hawks
- The Dark River, a 1943 play by Rodney Ackland
- The Dark River, an album by Vond, a side project of Mortiis
- "Dark River", a song by Coil from Love's Secret Domain
- Predator: Dark River, a 1996 science fiction comic storyline by Mark Verheiden, Ron Randall, and Rick Magyar

== Other ==
- Dark River (astronomy) or Great Rift, a series of dust clouds that divides the bright band of the Milky Way lengthwise

== See also ==
- List of river name etymologies, for other rivers whose name means "dark river"
