= Pitt River (disambiguation) =

Pitt River is a large tributary of the Fraser River in British Columbia, Canada.

Pitt River may also refer to:

- Pitt River (New Zealand), a river in Fiordland, New Zealand
- Pit River, or Pitt River in some spellings, a river in California, U.S.
  - Pit River Tribe, who live along the river
  - Pitt River Expedition, a number of expeditions named for the Pit River
- River Pitt, in Somerset, England

== See also ==
- Pitt-Rivers, an English surname
- Pitt Rivers Museum, University of Oxford
