= Elizabeth Island (New Zealand) =

Island in New Zealand

Pōkaikōkō
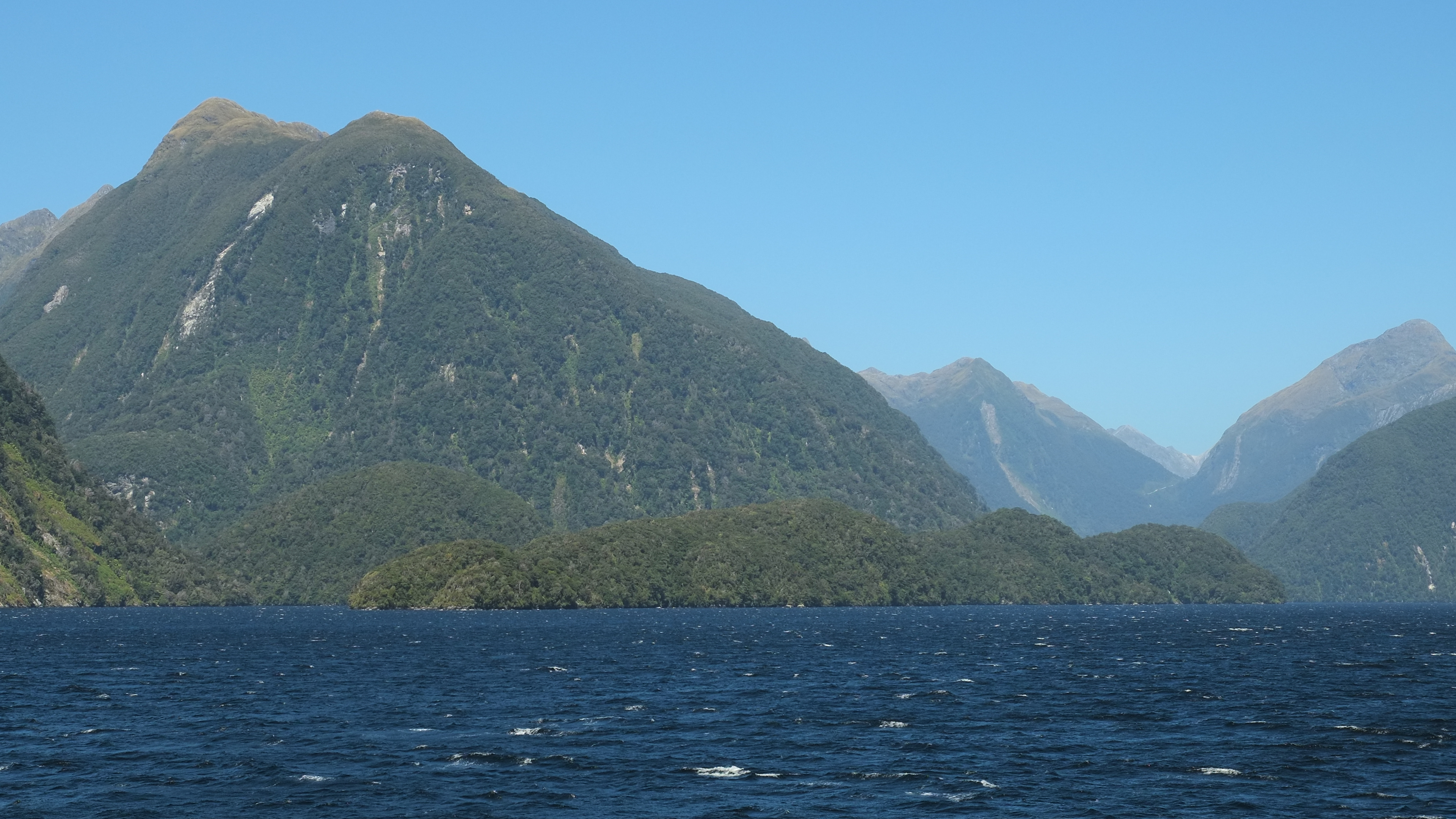
- Elizabeth Island in front of tall mountains of Doubtful Sound

- Location within New Zealand

Geography
- Location: Doubtful Sound
- Coordinates: 45°25′0″S 167°7′15″E
- Area: 0.6 km^{2} (0.23 sq mi)
- Length: 2.6 km (1.62 mi)
- Width: 0.4 km (0.25 mi)
- Highest elevation: 117 m (384 ft)

Administration
- New Zealand

Demographics
- Population: 0

Elizabeth Island (Māori: Pōkaikōkō) is the largest island in the inner Doubtful Sound, in Fiordland National Park, in New Zealand's South Island. It was created during the last glaciation, its narrow long shape aligned with the direction of the fiord. The island is uninhabited and entirely covered in dense native bush.

The island was named by Captain John Grono after his brig Elisabeth in late 1822 or early 1823 (itself named for his wife).

The waters surrounding Elizabeth Island are protected by the Taipari Roa (Elizabeth Island) Marine Reserve. The western side of the island, facing the main flow of Doubtful Sound, contains extensive rock wall habitats. Off the southern end of the island are deep kelp beds. To the east of Elizabeth Island lies a shallow channel with high water flow, containing Olphert Cove and the mouth of Elizabeth River. This area is also home to black and red coral.

== See also ==
- Desert island
- List of islands
