= Hawea (Clio Rocks) Marine Reserve =

Marine reserve in New Zealand

- IUCN category Ia (strict nature reserve)
- Location within Fiordland Location within New Zealand
- Interactive map of Hawea (Clio Rocks) Marine Reserve
- Location: Fiordland, New Zealand
- Coordinates: 44.82°S 167.52°E
- Area: 411 hectares (1,020 acres)
- Established: 2005
- Governing body: Department of Conservation

Hawea (Clio Rocks) Marine Reserve is a marine reserve covering an area of 411 hectares (1,020 acres) in Hāwea / Bligh Sound, in Fiordland on New Zealand's South Island. It was established in 2005 and is administered by the Department of Conservation.

== Geography and ecology ==
In the fiords, heavy rainfall runs off from the surrounding mountains creates a permanent freshwater layer to about 5 centimetres (2.0 in) to 10 metres (33 ft) below the surface. A layer of calm, clear and warm seawater provides a habitat for a range of sponges, corals and fish to about 40 metres (130 ft) below the surface. A final layer of seawater, too darkened by tannins from vegetation run-off to support most marine life, extends to depths of up to 400 metres (1,300 ft).

The fiords are also a habitat for black corals and brittle stars that live in their branches. There are also brachiopods, aihe (bottlenose dolphins), kekono (New Zealand fur seals), tawaki (Fiordland crested penguins) and kororā (little blue penguins).

Most of the reserve is a deep basin habitat, but there is also a sheltered shallow rock wall habitat and deep reef or rock wall habitat. There are steep rock walls on the shaded western side of the reserve, and more broken rocky reefs on the more sun-lit eastern side.

The key feature of the marine reserve are the almost vertical rock walls at Turn Round Point. Abundant species of reef fish and invertebrates feed on the plankton that is swept through in high tide, providing a food source for seals and larger feeding fish. Black corals are relatively abundant along the rock walls in the area.

== History ==
The Māori name Hāwea is after the ancient iwi of Kāti Hāwea.

The reserve was part of a conservation strategy the Fiordland Marine Guardians launched in 2002 and presented to the Ministry for the Environment Marian Hobbs and Minister of Fisheries Pete Hodgson in 2003. It was officially established on 21 April 2005.

The Ministry of Primary Industries, Fiordland Marine Guardians and other agencies are involved in protecting the marine reserve and stopping the spread of invasive seaweed.

The New Zealand Air Force conducted aerial surveillance patrols for illegal commercial fishing in 2021.

== Research and commerce ==
Educational and scientific activities are encouraged, but must not disturb or endanger plants, animals or natural features. Scientific research requires a permit from the Department of Conservation.

An area within the marine reserve is designated for commercial rock lobster fishers to store holding pots, including pots to sore live lobsters caught outside the reserve. No other commercial or non-commercial fishing or aquaculture is allowed.

== Recreation ==
The reserve is accessible from Te Anau via the Milford Road. Anchoring boats is banned in many areas to protect the particularly fragile species that can be damaged by anchors or swinging chains. Taking off and landing aircraft is permitted.

The protected marine life can be viewed by diving or snorkelling, either independently or with a tourism or charter boat service. To protect the fragile environments, divers must follow the safety and care codes.

There is a ban on fishing, taking, killing or moving marine life and materials. However, members of Ngāi Tahu may remove pounamu provided they have the right authorisation, only collect by hand, keep disturbance to the site to a minimum, and only carry as much as they can in one trip. They may also collect deceased marine mammals and collect teeth and bones.

== See also ==
- Marine reserves of New Zealand
