= Sutherland Sound =

Fiord of the South Island of New Zealand

Te Hāpua / Sutherland Sound
- Sutherland Sound
- Te Hāpua (Māori)
- Location in New Zealand Te Hāpua / Sutherland Sound (New Zealand)
- Location: Tasman Sea
- Coordinates: 44.73°S 167.57°E
- River sources: Light River, Dark River
- Basin countries: New Zealand
- Max. length: 10 km (6.2 mi)
- Max. width: 1 km (0.62 mi)

Sutherland Sound (officially Te Hāpua / Sutherland Sound) is a fiord of the South Island of New Zealand. It is the smallest of the fiords that make up the coast of Fiordland, and the only one with limited sea access (owing to a large sandbar at the entrance to its narrower section). It is the second most northerly of the fiords, 22 kilometres (14 miles) southwest of Milford Sound / Piopiotahi and eight kilometres (five miles) northeast of Hāwea / Bligh Sound. The fiord is ten kilometres (six miles) in length and the Light River and the Dark River flow into the eastern end. The fiord is composed of two main sections – a large bay opening into the sea, and a more traditional fiord as the inner section. These are separated by a narrow channel less than 100 metres (330 ft) wide at its narrowest point.

Sutherland Sound

== History and naming ==
The fiord was named Sutherland Sound after explorer Donald Sutherland who visited the fiord in 1883. In October 2019, the name of the fiord was officially changed to Te Hāpua / Sutherland Sound.
