= Grono (surname) =

Grono is a surname. Notable people with the surname include:

- John Grono (c. 1763–1847), Welsh-born Australian settler, sailor, whaler, and farmer
- Nick Grono (born 1966), Australian human rights campaigner
