= Taipari Roa (Elizabeth Island) Marine Reserve =

Marine reserve in New Zealand territorial waters

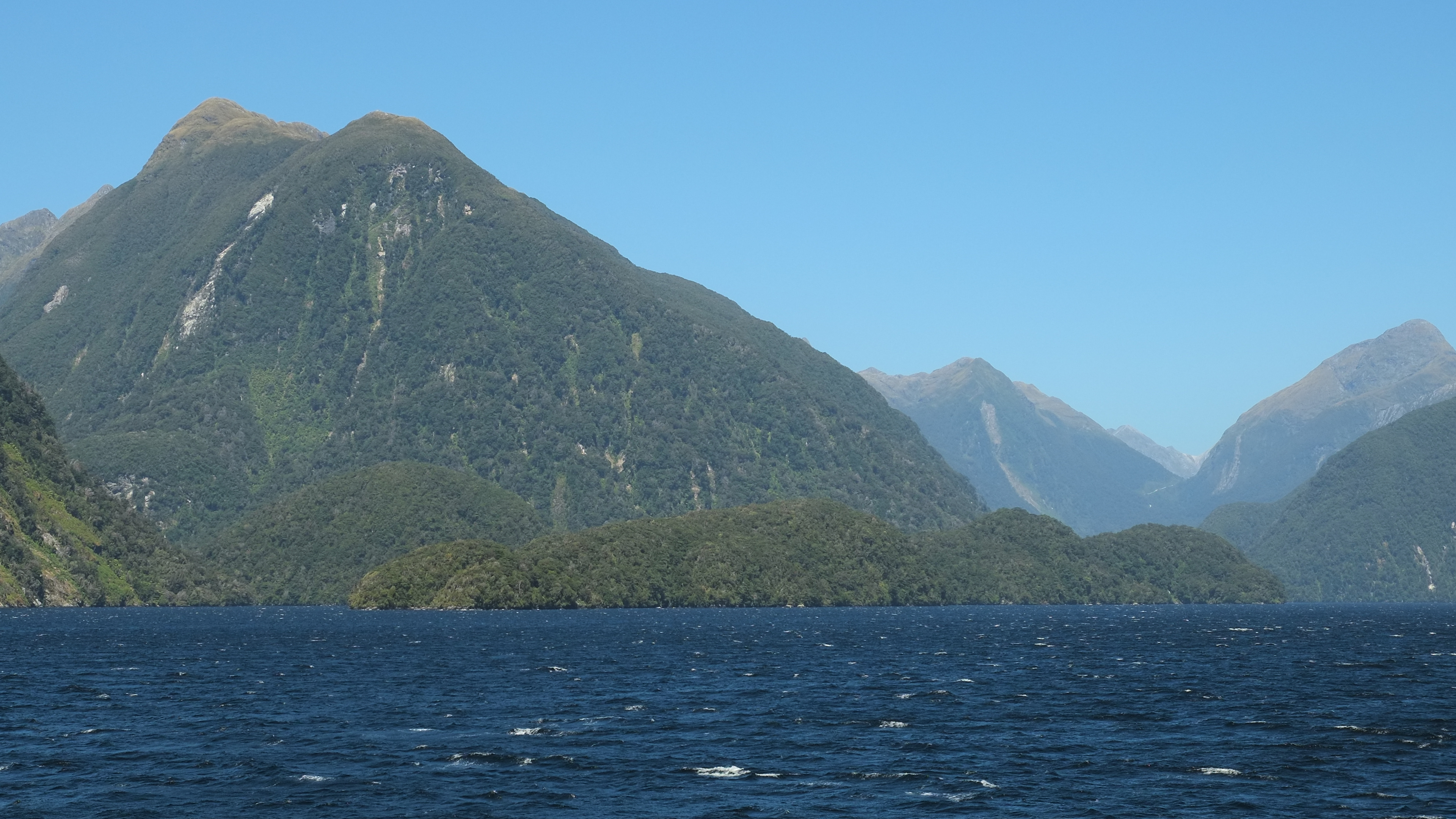
- Elizabeth Island in Doubtful Sound

- Location within South Island
- Location: Fiordland, New Zealand
- Coordinates: 45.428771°S 167.122316°E
- Area: 613 hectares (1,510 acres)
- Established: 2005
- Governing body: Department of Conservation

Taipari Roa (Elizabeth Island) Marine Reserve is a marine reserve covering an area of 613 hectares (1,510 acres) around Elizabeth Island, in the inner Doubtful Sound / Patea of Fiordland on New Zealand's South Island. It was established in 2005 and is administered by the Department of Conservation.

== Geography and ecology ==
In the fiords, heavy rainfall runs off from the surrounding mountains creates a permanent freshwater layer to about 5 centimetres (2.0 in) to 10 metres (33 ft) below the surface. Further down, a layer of calm, clear and warm seawater provides a habitat for a range of sponges, corals and fish to about 40 metres (130 ft) below the surface.

There is an extensive rock wall habitat on the western side of Elizabeth Island, and there are deep kelp beds on the southern side of the island. In the relatively shallow channel on eastern side, a range of suspension feeders including black corals, red corals and zoanthids.

On the southern side of the reserve, Rolla Island is a habitat for the Fiordland Crested Penguin.

Bottlenose dolphins often visit the reserve.

There are also a range of bright yellow glass sponges that are unique to this fiord and caves in Jamaica.

== History ==
The steep landscape of the fiord shaped by ice glaciers, which melted during ice ages forming valleys and islands.

The construction of the Manapouri Power Stationin 1969 caused major changes to the hydrographic environment of Doubtful Sound. It involved the construction of a tunnel from Lake Manapouri that transferred more fresh water into the Sound. This had a range of effects on marine life in the Sound, including the black corals around Elizabeth Island.

The reserve was part of a conservation strategy the Fiordland Marine Guardians launched in 2002 and presented to the Ministry for the Environment Marian Hobbs and Minister of Fisheries Pete Hodgson in 2003. It was officially established on 21 April 2005.

The Ministry of Primary Industries, Fiordland Marine Guardians and other agencies are involved in protecting the marine reserve and stopping the spread of invasive seaweed.

== Research and commerce ==
Educational and scientific activities are encouraged, but must not disturb or endanger plants, animals or natural features. Scientific research requires a permit from the Department of Conservation.

== Recreation ==
The reserve is accessible from Te Anau via the Milford Road. Anchoring boats is banned in many areas to protect the particularly fragile species that can be damaged by anchors or swinging chains. Taking off and landing aircraft is permitted. Boats must follow rules to reduce the impact on the dolphin population.

The protected marine life can be viewed by diving or snorkelling, either independently or with a tourism or charter boat service. To protect the fragile environments, divers must follow the safety and care codes.

There is a ban on fishing, and taking, killing or moving marine life and materials. However, members of Ngāi Tahu may remove pounamu provided they have the right authorisation, only collect by hand, keep disturbance to the site to a minimum, and only carry as much as they can in one trip. They may also collect deceased marine mammals and collect teeth and bones.

== See also ==
- Marine reserves of New Zealand
