= Dark River (New Zealand) =

River in New Zealand

- Route of the Dark River
- Mouth of the Dark River Dark River (New Zealand) (South Island)

Location
- Country: New Zealand

Physical characteristics
- Source: Franklin Mountains
  - coordinates: 44°49′44″S 167°41′36″E
- Mouth
  - location: Te Hāpua / Sutherland Sound
  - coordinates: 44°47′01″S 167°37′28″E

Basin features
- Progression: Dark River → Te Hāpua / Sutherland Sound → Tasman Sea
- Tributaries
  - left: Starvation Creek, Robb Creek

The Dark River, New Zealand is a river of Fiordland, New Zealand. It rises west of Barrier Peak and flows westward through Fiordland National Park into Lake Grave, which drains into Te Hāpua / Sutherland Sound.

== See also ==
- List of rivers of New Zealand
