= North Secretary Island =

Island in British Columbia, Canada

Coordinates: 48°57′55″N 123°35′45″W

North Secretary Island is located in the Gulf Islands where Trincomali Channel and Houstoun Passage meet in the Gulf Islands region of the South Coast of British Columbia, Canada. It is 138 acres (0.56 km^{2}) in size and is located in Trincomali Channel as part of the Secretary Islands group off the north tip of Saltspring Island. There are two islands in the Secretary Islands group, the southern being named South Secretary and the larger one being named North Secretary Island. There is another Secretary Island in British Columbia, in Sooke Basin.

The Secretary Islands were named in 1859 by Captain Richards, RN, after J.L. Southey, RN, secretary to Rear Admiral Baynes, commander-in-chief of the Pacific Station, 1857–60, on account of their proximity to Southey Point, which is the northern tip of Saltspring Island.

North Secretary Island is currently owned by a group of private owners from across British Columbia.

== See also ==
- Secretary Island (New Zealand)
