= Sabatinca pluvialis =

Conservation status
- Data Deficit (NZ TCS)

Scientific classification
- Kingdom: Animalia
- Phylum: Arthropoda
- Clade: Pancrustacea
- Class: Insecta
- Order: Lepidoptera
- Family: Micropterigidae
- Genus: Sabatinca
- Species: S. pluvialis

Binomial name
- Sabatinca pluvialis Gibbs, 2014

Species of moth endemic to New Zealand

Sabatinca pluvialis is a species of moth belonging to the family Micropterigidae. It is endemic to New Zealand and is only known from Secretary Island. Adults of this species are on the wing from the middle of December until the middle of January. The larval host species is the liverwort Pseudomarsupidium piliferum. In 2025 this species was classified as "data deficient" under the New Zealand Threat Classification System.

== Taxonomy ==
This species was first described by George Gibbs in 2014. The male holotype specimen was collected by Gibbs at Grono Spur on Secretary Island and is held in the New Zealand Arthropod Collection.

== Description ==
Gibbs described the species as follows:

Antennal base pale ochreous, grading to black tip. Forewing creamy-white with bold pattern of iridescent blackish-grey, with faint purplish sheen.

As at 2014 the female of this species is unknown.

== Distribution ==
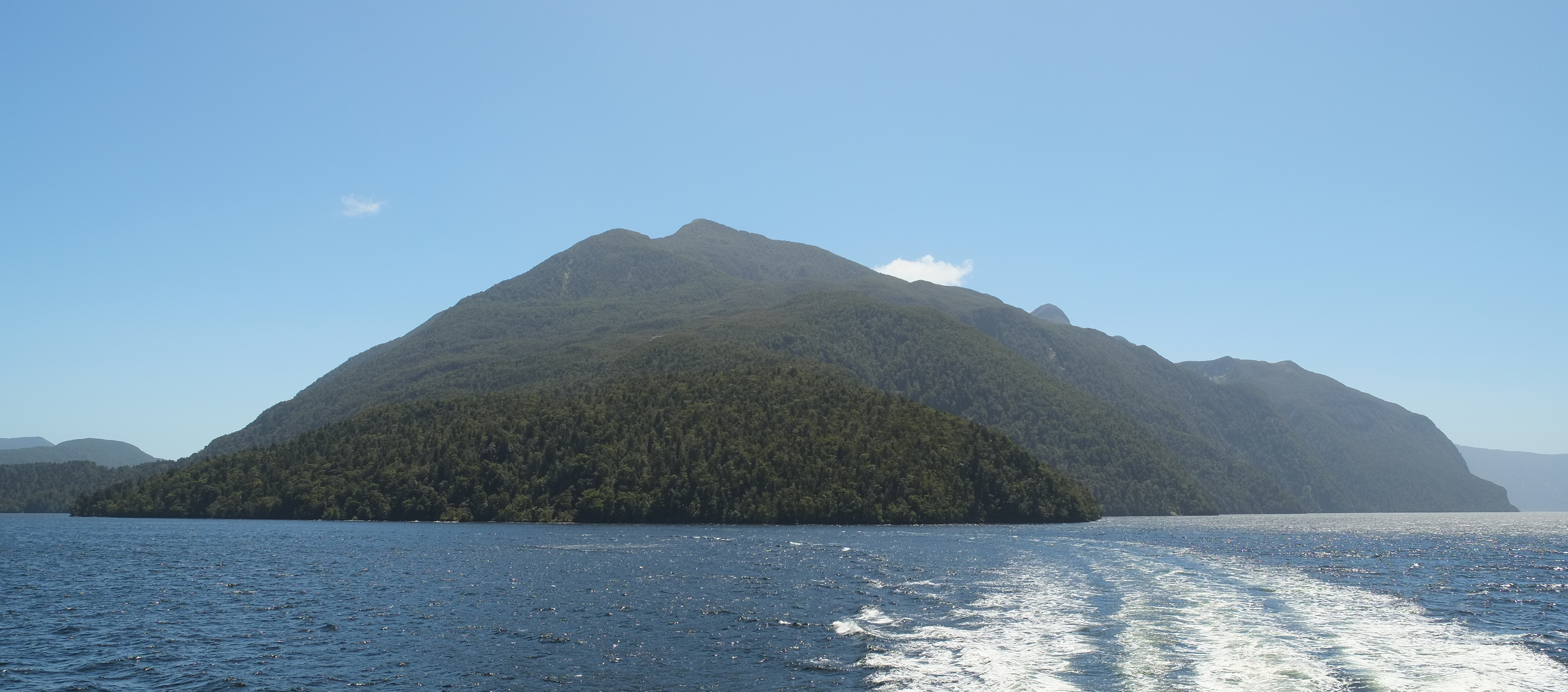
Secretary Island, type locality of S. pluvialis

This species is endemic to New Zealand and is only known from Secretary Island in Fiordland. It has the most restrictive range of the known species of Sabatinca in New Zealand. This species first became known to science when John Grehan collected a specimen in 1982. C. F. Butcher subsequently collected larvae now known to of this species.

== Behaviour ==
As at 2014 adults of this species are known to be on the wing from the middle of December until the middle of January but it has been hypothesised that their flight period is likely to be of a longer duration.

== Host species ==
Larvae of this species have been collected from the trunks of trees in the genus Nothofagus, upon which liverworts flourish as a result of the frequent rain that falls on the west coast and its off lying islands of New Zealand. The larvae were found to be hosted by the liverwort Pseudomarsupidium piliferum.

== Conservation status ==
In 2025 this species was classified by the New Zealand Department of Conservation as "data deficient" under the New Zealand Threat Classification System. S. pluvialis is known from only one location.
