= Pitt River (New Zealand) =

River in New Zealand

- Route of the Pitt River
- Mouth of the Pitt River Pitt River (New Zealand) (South Island)

Location
- Country: New Zealand

Physical characteristics
- Source: Mount Sydney Dacres
  - coordinates: 44°55′59″S 167°34′26″E
- Mouth
  - location: Wild Natives River
  - coordinates: 44°53′03″S 167°32′58″E

Basin features
- Progression: Pitt River → Wild Natives River → Hāwea / Bligh Sound → Tasman Sea

The Pitt River is a river in Fiordland, New Zealand. It rises north-west of Oilskin Pass and flows north-westward into Lake Beddoes and Wild Natives River.

== See also ==
- List of rivers of New Zealand
