= Light River (New Zealand) =

River in New Zealand

- Route of the Light River
- Mouth of the Light River Light River (New Zealand) (South Island)

Location
- Country: New Zealand

Physical characteristics
- Source
  - coordinates: 44°45′29″S 167°42′55″E
- Mouth
  - location: Te Hāpua / Sutherland Sound
  - coordinates: 44°46′59″S 167°37′44″E

Basin features
- Progression: Light River → Te Hāpua / Sutherland Sound → Tasman Sea

The Light River (also known as Te Houiti) is a river of Fiordland, New Zealand. It rises west of Lake Quill and flows westward into Te Hāpua / Sutherland Sound.

== See also ==
- List of rivers of New Zealand
