= Elizabeth River (New Zealand) =

- Route of the Elizabeth River
- Mouth of the Elizabeth River Elizabeth River (New Zealand) (South Island)

Location
- Country: New Zealand

Physical characteristics
- Source
  - coordinates: 45°24′53″S 167°14′42″E
- Mouth
  - location: Olphert Cove
  - coordinates: 45°25′00″S 167°07′58″E

Basin features
- Progression: Elizabeth River → Olphert Cove → Doubtful Sound / Patea → Tasman Sea
- Tributaries
  - right: Stella Burn

The Elizabeth River, New Zealand is a river of Fiordland, New Zealand. It rises north of Mount George and flows westward through Fiordland National Park into Doubtful Sound / Patea at Olphert Cove. Elizabeth Island is opposite the river mouth. The river and island were named by Captain John Grono after his brig Elizabeth in late 1822 or early 1823.

== See also ==
- List of rivers of New Zealand
