= Grono.net =

Polish social networking website

- Founded: February 20, 2004; 21 years ago
- Dissolved: July 1, 2012; 12 years ago
- Founder(s): Wojciech Sobczuk, Piotr Bronowicz, Tomasz Lis
- URL: www.grono.net

Grono.net was a social networking service based in Poland. It was referred to as "the Polish equivalent of Facebook" and had over 2 million members.

It featured Internet forums, photo sharing, links to cultural events, an employment website, and an online marketplace for the sale of property.

The site included a freemium model; features for paying subscribers included the ability to moderate forums, take part in competitions, upload more photos and hide advertisements.

It required an invitation from an existing member to register.

== History ==
The website was founded by Wojciech Sobczuk, Piotr Bronowicz and Tomasz Lis and launched on February 20, 2004.

In July 2009, Aleksander Kierski, one of grono.net's creditors, filed a bankruptcy petition against the service for unpaid debts, but on September 7, 2009, the Warsaw District Court dismissed the above petition on the grounds that all creditors had been paid.

On 1 July 2012, the service was shut down without warning; it faced financial difficulties due to competition from Facebook.
