= Hinenui / Nancy Sound =

Fiord on the South Island of New Zealand

- Hinenui (Māori)
- Location in New Zealand Hinenui / Nancy Sound (New Zealand)
- Interactive map of Hinenui / Nancy Sound
- Location: Tasman Sea
- Coordinates: 45°08′23″S 167°04′05″E
- River sources: Multiple unnamed rivers
- Basin countries: New Zealand
- Max. length: 15.4 kilometres (9.6 mi)
- Max. width: 0.9 kilometres (0.56 mi)
- Surface area: 13.9 square kilometres (5.4 sq mi)
- Average depth: 279 metres (915 ft)

Hinenui / Nancy Sound is a fiord on the South Island of New Zealand. It is one of the fiords that form the coast of Fiordland.

== Geography ==
Hinenui / Nancy Sound is located between Taiporoporo / Charles Sound and Te Awa-o-Tū / Thompson Sound, part of the Doubtful Sound complex. The fiord runs straight in a northwesterly direction for most of its 15.4 kilometre length, with the exception of a bend to the west near its entrance and a nearly right-angle bend near its head. This section, known as 'Foot Arm' due to its resemblance to a human foot (along with similarly-named 'Heel Cove' and 'Toe Cove' at their respective positions), runs in a southwesterly direction before turning at Heel Cove to join the main channel of the Fiord.

The fiord has two small islands at its entrance. One of these, the aptly-named Entrance Island, sits to the north of the main channel, off the coast of Burnett Point. The other, Anxiety Island, is in a similar position to the south, sitting just north of Anxiety Point. The seafloor between these two islands is relatively shallow, at a depth of approximately 77 metres (253 ft). Once inside the fiord, the seafloor decreases to a maximum depth of 279 metres (915 ft) in the Acheron basin, named after HMS Acheron which first surveyed the area in 1851.

As with most of the fiords in Fiordland, Hinenui is flanked by steep mountains. To the southwest of the main channel, the Master Ridge runs roughly parallel to the fiord, with Mount Napier at 1,195 metres (3,921 ft) in the middle. There is not a well-defined ridgeline to the same extent to the northeast of the fiord, however Command Peak sits roughly opposite Mount Napier on this side. This includes a small tarn, the runoff from which drains through a small river into the fiord at the end of Foot Arm.

== Name ==
As with many other places in Fiordland, the exact origins of the European name for the fiord - Nancy Sound - are unclear, due primarily to most of the early European exploration coming from sealers and whalers. The most likely origin for the name is that the fiord was named after the Nancy, a ship under the command of John Grono, who in turn was one of the first Europeans to explore the area prior to 1823.

In October 2019, the name of the fiord was officially altered to include the Māori name for the fiord, Hinenui (translating as 'big woman'). The name change to Hinenui / Nancy Sound was part of a proposal to officially add dual names to all of the fiords in Fiordland, as previously only Milford Sound / Piopiotahi and Doubtful Sound / Patea had dual names. This was done to "recognise the significance of both names and provide a window to rich stories in both Māori and English". Other features in the fiord maintain Māori names which have not been officially gazetted, such as Tā-te-kākāpō for Foot Arm, which recognised the former prevalence of kākāpō in the area.
