= Mount Grono =

Mountain in New Zealand

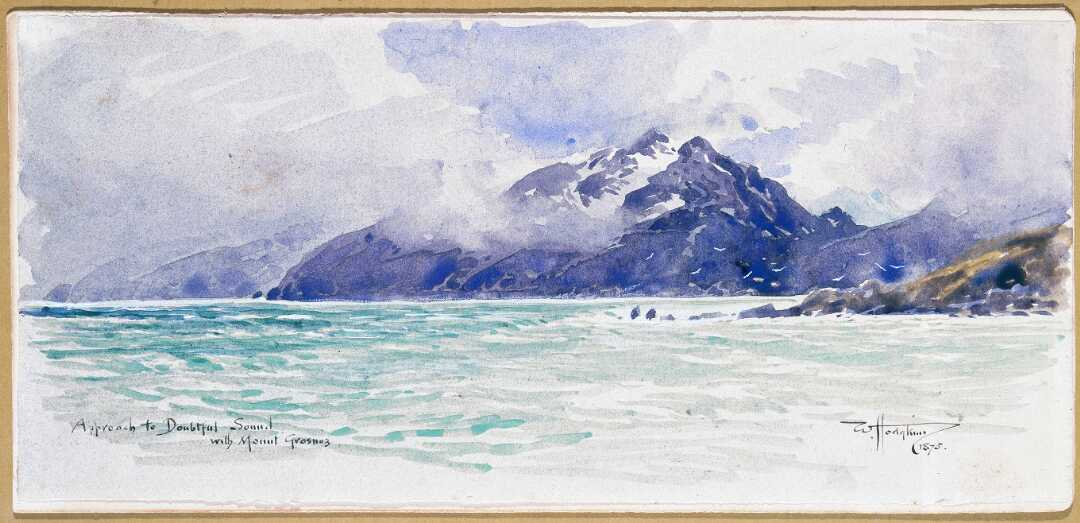
- Approach to Doubtful Sound with Mount Grosnez (1875) by W. M. Hodgkins

Highest point
- Elevation: 1,196 m (3,924 ft)
- Coordinates: 45°15′54″S 166°57′06″E

Naming
- Etymology: Named for John Grono
- Native name: Te Paparoa-o-Tū (Māori)
- Defining authority: New Zealand Geographic Board

Geography
- Location within New Zealand
- Country: New Zealand
- Region: Southland Region
- District: Southland District

Mount Grono (Māori: Te Paparoa-o-Tū), previously spelled Mount Groznoz, is a 1,196-metre (3,924 ft) peak on Secretary Island, part of New Zealand's Fiordland National Park. It was named for early 19th century sealer John Grono.

Mount Grono is the highest peak in New Zealand's main island chain outside of the North and South Islands.
