= Franklin Mountains (New Zealand) =

Mountains in New Zealand

- Te Ahi-a-Mahuika
- Location within Fiordland

Highest point
- Peak: Mount Kane
- Elevation: 1,714 m (5,623 ft)
- Coordinates: 44°57′11″S 167°44′17″E

Naming
- Etymology: Named by James McKerrow in honour of John Franklin

Geography
- Location: Southwestern South Island
- Country: New Zealand
- Range coordinates: 44.916°S 167.717°E

Geology
- Orogeny: Tectonic uplift

The Franklin Mountains of New Zealand are a group of peaks in the southwestern area of the South Island, located between Bligh Sound and Lake Te Anau, within Fiordland National Park.
