= HMS Royal William =

Three ships of the Royal Navy have borne the name HMS Royal William

- HMS Royal William was a 100-gun first rate launched in 1670 as HMS Prince. She was rebuilt in 1692 and renamed HMS Royal William, rebuilt again in 1719, and rearmed to 84 guns and fitted as a guardship in 1790. She was broken up in 1813.
- HMS Royal William (1757) a cut down version of the above to create an 84-gun ship of the line built at Portsmouth and part of the Battle of Cape Spartel
- HMS Royal William (1833) was a 120-gun first rate launched in 1833. She was fitted with screw propulsion and rearmed to 72 guns in 1860, and became a training ship named Clarence in 1885. She was burnt by accident in 1899.

== See also ==
- RMS Royal William
- Scottish ship Royal William, a 32-gun fifth rate, renamed HMS Edinburgh when the Royal Scots Navy was merged into the Royal Navy by the Act of Union.
