= Secretary Island =

Island in southwestern New Zealand

Native name: Ka Tū-waewae-o-Tū
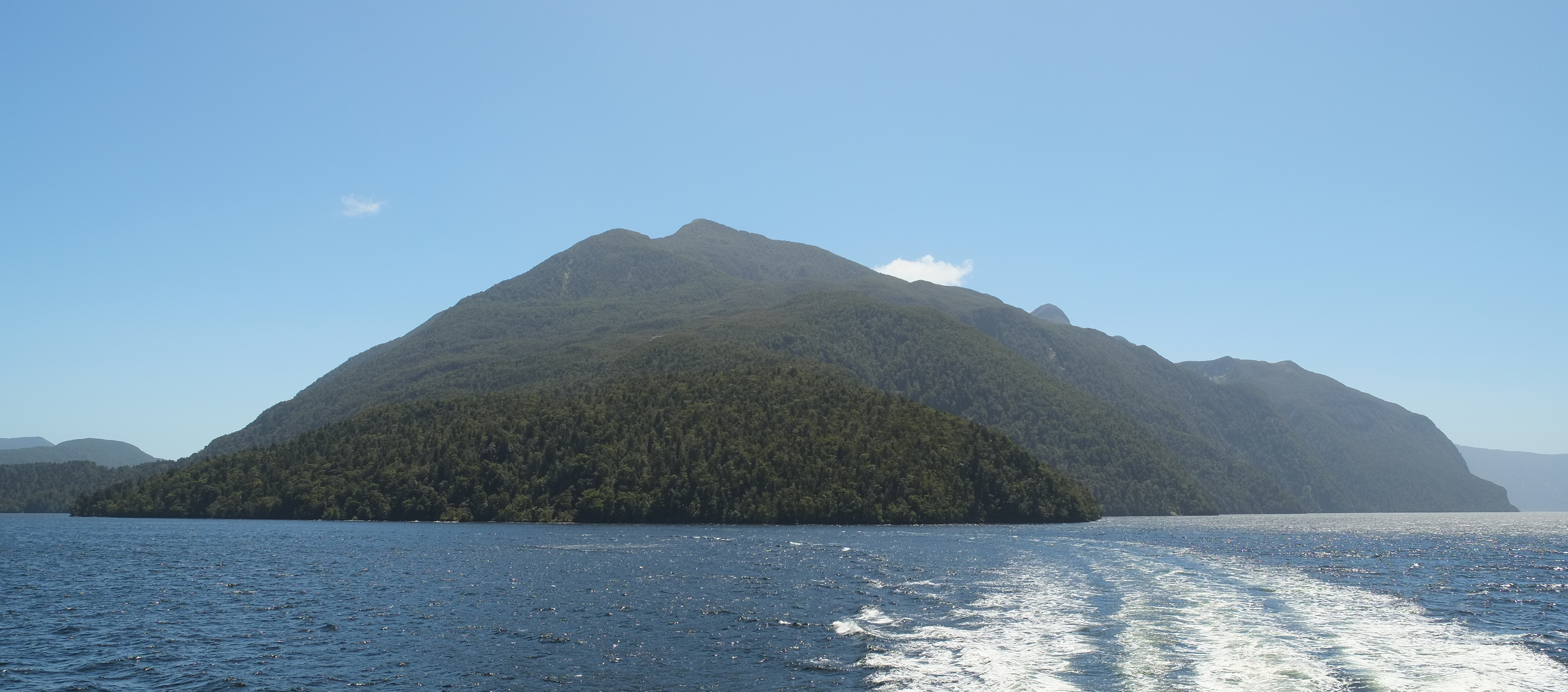
- Secretary Island's eastern end

- Location of Secretary Island in relationship to the South Island Secretary Island (South Island)
- Interactive map of Secretary Island

Geography
- Location: Fiordland
- Coordinates: 45°15′S 166°55′E
- Area: 81.4 km^{2} (31.4 sq mi)
- Highest elevation: 1,196 m (3924 ft)
- Highest point: Mount Grono

Administration
- New Zealand

Demographics
- Population: 0

Secretary Island (Māori: Ka Tū-waewae-o-Tū) is an island in southwestern New Zealand, lying entirely within Fiordland National Park. Roughly triangular in shape, it lies between Doubtful Sound / Patea in the south and Te Awa-o-Tū / Thompson Sound in the north, with its west coast facing the Tasman Sea. To the east of the island, Pendulo Reach connects Te Awa-o-Tū / Thompson Sound with Doubtful Sound / Patea. Steeply sloped, the entirely bush-clad island rises to a chain of several peaks higher than 1000 metres. The highest of these is the 1,196-metre (3,924 ft) Mount Grono, the highest peak in the main New Zealand chain not located in the North or South Island. The island also contains three lakes. The largest, Secretary Lake, over 600 metres (2,000 ft) long, is located beneath Mount Grono at an altitude of 550 metres (1,800 ft).

The island is uninhabited, and covers 81.4 km^{2} (31 sq mi) of predominantly steep terrain almost entirely covered in dense native beech-podocarp forest, including plants such as mistletoes and mountain lancewood, which have been decimated elsewhere by the browsing of possums.

Its isolation and size make Secretary Island one of the most important islands in New Zealand for the conservation efforts of vulnerable native species. The island was never inhabited by possums or rodents, and by 2007, deer and stoat were eradicated as well, making it the largest completely pest-free island in New Zealand.

With the removal of deer, the complete native ecosystem is thriving, with plants from ground covers through to trees supporting a healthy population of native animals from insects and spiders to native birds. Transferred populations of endangered birds in particular have been recovering thanks to the absence of rats and mice.

== Pest eradication ==
Between 2004 and 2008, the New Zealand Department of Conservation engaged in a project to eradicate pests from the island, to help protect native species found on the island. This was the largest Fiordland island targeted to achieve pest-free status, with the project aiming to eradicate deer and stoat, the only remaining animal pests present on Secretary Island at the time.

The deer population on Secretary Island was estimated at more than 700 as recently as 2006, before the eradication project reduced their numbers to a handful of deer that have still evaded capture. The removal of deer contributes significantly to the regeneration of native plants, which in turn helps support the endangered native species on the island as part of the natural process of restoration of the island's ecosystem.

From 2004 onwards, a network of stoat traps has been created on the island, connected via tramping tracks cut through the bush. The removal of stoats will provide significant protection for native species already present on the island, such as the Fiordland crested penguin, New Zealand falcon, kākā, kiwi and kākāriki. Becoming a stoat-free sanctuary would also allow the re-introduction of other species no longer found on the mainland, such as the Fiordland skink and kākāpō.

== Recovery of endangered native animals ==
The absence of rodents allows an abundant population of native invertebrates to thrive, including the critically endangered knobbled weevil.

In 2008, 25 New Zealand rock wrens were translocated onto Secretary Island, with excellent results. A search by DoC rangers two years later found twelve unbanded rock wrens, confirming that natural breeding started to occur shortly after the translocation. Sixteen more birds were transferred in 2010. With its southern location and many areas over 1000 metres above sea level, Secretary Island is the most suitable offshore island for these alpine birds, as it offers the harsh alpine areas they prefer. On the mainland, rock wren are threatened by introduced predators.

27 North Island kōkako have also been moved to Secretary Island in 2008.

One of the largest relocations was the transfer of up to 60 yellowheads (mohua) caught in the Dart Valley and flown to Secretary Island to establish a population of these rare birds in a rat-free environment. The number of birds is sufficiently high to ensure adequate genetic diversity.

Other native birds transferred to the island following the eradication of stoat are South Island robin in 2008, and takahē in 2009.

Secretary Island is the only known locality of the New Zealand endemic moth species Sabatinca pluvialis.

== Public Access ==
Secretary Island has been identified as a potential "Open Sanctuary" under the Fiordland National Park Draft Management Plan, which means that while it is protected, open access to the public would still be permitted. However, the island may be closed temporarily during the restoration project for stoat and deer control.

As with all of New Zealand's offshore conservation islands, visitors are expected to be diligent in ensuring they do not carry unwanted plant or animal pests onto Secretary Island via clothing, bags or equipment.

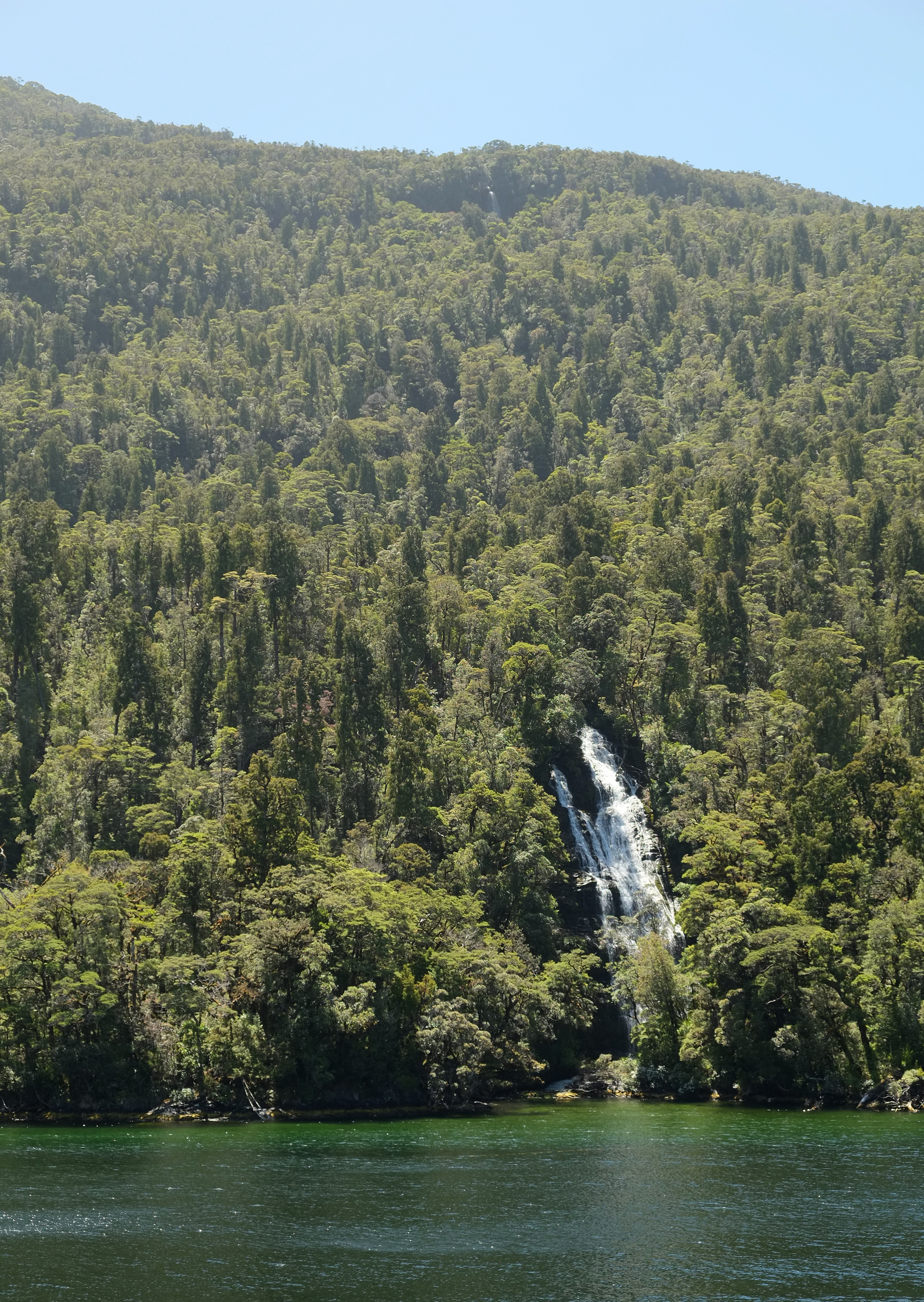
Blanket Bay viewed from a Doubtful Sound tour boat

Blanket Bay on the southeast coast of the island has a small island in it with a wharf and a hut used for refuelling and supply by fishermen. A waterfall plunging from Secretary Island into the bay has been used in the past as a handy supply of fresh water.

Secretary Island is separated from Bauza Island by the Te Awaatu Channel, only 200 metres (660 ft) wide at its narrowest point. The waters between the two islands are protected by the Te Awaatu Channel (The Gut) Marine Reserve. Doubtful Sound tour boats routinely travel through this channel, providing the public with an easy way to see this remote island up-close.

A radio repeater is located on Mt Grono, the highest point on the island, to provide communication coverage for boat operators in and around the Fiordland coast.

== Earthquake ==
In 1993 Secretary Island was the epicentre of a M_{w} 6.8 earthquake, which was reportedly felt in Sydney. Ten years later, the 2003 Fiordland earthquake had an epicentre near Secretary Island.

== Climate ==
Climate data for Secretary Island (1991–2020 normals, extremes 1994–present)
Month	Jan	Feb	Mar	Apr	May	Jun	Jul	Aug	Sep	Oct	Nov	Dec	Year
Record high °C (°F)	27.9 (82.2)	28.3 (82.9)	26.9 (80.4)	23.8 (74.8)	23.2 (73.8)	18.1 (64.6)	17.8 (64.0)	19.4 (66.9)	21.4 (70.5)	22.0 (71.6)	23.6 (74.5)	26.0 (78.8)	28.3 (82.9)
Mean maximum °C (°F)	23.4 (74.1)	23.3 (73.9)	22.4 (72.3)	19.7 (67.5)	18.2 (64.8)	15.6 (60.1)	15.5 (59.9)	16.2 (61.2)	16.8 (62.2)	18.5 (65.3)	20.0 (68.0)	22.0 (71.6)	24.8 (76.6)
Mean daily maximum °C (°F)	18.0 (64.4)	18.3 (64.9)	17.2 (63.0)	15.6 (60.1)	13.7 (56.7)	12.2 (54.0)	11.8 (53.2)	12.2 (54.0)	12.9 (55.2)	13.8 (56.8)	14.8 (58.6)	16.7 (62.1)	14.8 (58.6)
Daily mean °C (°F)	14.8 (58.6)	15.1 (59.2)	14.1 (57.4)	12.8 (55.0)	11.2 (52.2)	9.6 (49.3)	9.1 (48.4)	9.5 (49.1)	10.2 (50.4)	10.8 (51.4)	11.8 (53.2)	13.5 (56.3)	11.9 (53.4)
Mean daily minimum °C (°F)	11.6 (52.9)	11.9 (53.4)	11.1 (52.0)	9.9 (49.8)	8.7 (47.7)	7.0 (44.6)	6.5 (43.7)	6.7 (44.1)	7.4 (45.3)	7.9 (46.2)	8.7 (47.7)	10.4 (50.7)	9.0 (48.2)
Mean minimum °C (°F)	7.8 (46.0)	7.8 (46.0)	7.0 (44.6)	5.5 (41.9)	4.4 (39.9)	3.3 (37.9)	2.9 (37.2)	2.8 (37.0)	3.1 (37.6)	3.7 (38.7)	4.6 (40.3)	6.9 (44.4)	1.7 (35.1)
Record low °C (°F)	5.7 (42.3)	4.7 (40.5)	5.1 (41.2)	2.2 (36.0)	1.0 (33.8)	1.5 (34.7)	0.7 (33.3)	0.9 (33.6)	1.0 (33.8)	1.9 (35.4)	1.6 (34.9)	4.5 (40.1)	0.7 (33.3)
Average rainfall mm (inches)	364.1 (14.33)	280.2 (11.03)	351.5 (13.84)	318.7 (12.55)	380.8 (14.99)	297.2 (11.70)	255.8 (10.07)	258.0 (10.16)	314.8 (12.39)	370.4 (14.58)	322.6 (12.70)	365.3 (14.38)	3,879.4 (152.72)
Source: NIWA

== See also ==
- Secretary Islands
- Island restoration
- List of islands of New Zealand
- List of islands
- Desert island
