= Hāwea / Bligh Sound =

Fiord of the South Island of New Zealand

- Hāwea (Māori)
- Location in New Zealand Hāwea / Bligh Sound (New Zealand)
- Interactive map of Hāwea / Bligh Sound
- Location: Tasman Sea
- Coordinates: 44.82°S 167.52°E
- River sources: Wild Natives River
- Basin countries: New Zealand
- Max. length: 15 km (9.3 mi)
- Max. width: 1 km (0.62 mi)

Hāwea / Bligh Sound is a fiord of the South Island of New Zealand. It is located in Fiordland, 30 kilometres southwest of Milford Sound, and is 15 kilometres in length. The fiord forms a crooked "Z" shape. Wild Natives River flows into the innermost arm, Bounty Haven.

== History and naming ==
The Māori name Hāwea is after the ancient iwi of Kāti Hāwea. The fiord was named Bligh Sound in 1809 by John Grono, after the ship Governor Bligh in honour of the Governor of New South Wales, William Bligh.

In October 2019, the name of the fiord was officially altered to Hāwea / Bligh Sound.

== Marine reserve ==
Hawea (Clio Rocks) Marine Reserve covers 411 hectares in the central part of the fiord. The reserve includes large areas of sheltered shallow rock wall habitat and deep reef or rock wall habitat.
