= Arapawa pig =

Breed of pig

Arapawa Pig
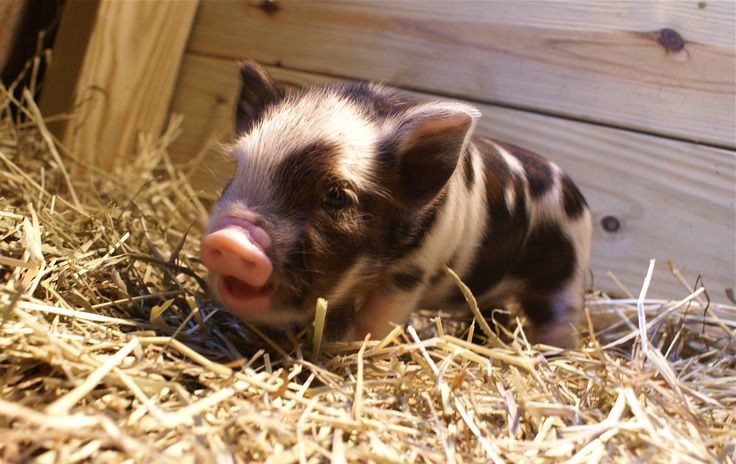
- Arapawa Piglet
- Other names: Arapawa Island
- Country of origin: New Zealand
- Distribution: Arapaoa Island

Traits
- Weight: Male: 120–180 kg; Female: 80–100 kg

The Arapawa pig is a feral breed of domestic pig (Sus scrofa) found on Arapaoa Island in the Marlborough Sounds, New Zealand. Although there are suggestions that the animals are descendants of pigs introduced to the area by James Cook in 1773 and 1777, they apparently derive from Oxford Sandy and Black stock brought to the island by whalers of the Te Awaiti whaling station established in 1827 by John Guard. They are known to have inhabited the island since 1839. In 1998 four piglets were removed from the island and have since bred successfully.

== Description ==
The Arapawa pig has reverted to a wild type that is quite hairy and has a mane. Compared with Auckland Island Pigs, another distinctive feral breed deriving from many generations of insular isolation, Arapawa pigs are larger, and have shorter noses and tails. Compared to non-feral domesticated pigs, however, they are smaller, with a slower growth rate. They are principally sandy or tan in coloration, often with black patches. The boars weigh 120–180 kg, and the sows 80–100 kg. They have long faces and snouts, with small, pricked ears; they do not have wattles. They have wide shoulders and boars have a heavy shield. Their skin is thick and hard. While they are very alert, they do not have an aggressive temperament.

The RBCS distinguishes between feral animals, landraces, standardised breeds and industrial strains of animals, using the definitions of the American Livestock Breeds Conservancy. The Rare Breeds Conservation Society of New Zealand recognizes "geographically defined feral livestock groups throughout New Zealand as individual breeds unique to [New Zealand]." As of 2014, no research has been done to determine if there is a genetic link between the Arapawa pig and other domestic breeds. The RBCS lists the Arapawa pig among its rare and minority breeds of livestock with a priority conservation rating.

In 2007, New Zealand Post issued a series of stamps about notable pig breeds of New Zealand to commemorate the Chinese Year of the Pig. The Arapawa pig was featured in the $1.35 stamp.
