= Ann Boyce =

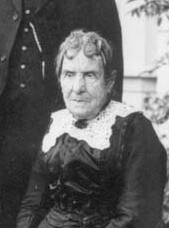
- Boyce in 1910
- Born: Ann Cave; 20 November 1827; Sydney
- Died: 28 February 1914 (aged 86); Motueka, New Zealand
- Known for: pioneer, herbalist

Ann Boyce (20 November 1827 – 28 February 1914) was a New Zealand founding mother and herbalist. She was born Ann Cave in Sydney, Australia, on 20 November 1827. In 1837 she came to Port Underwood in Marlborough, New Zealand, with her family. She married William Boyce when she was 16 or less, and they lived in the Nelson area, and later Motueka. She had 13 children. Boyce had close contact with Māori people from the time she came to New Zealand. In Motueka, she was known as a herbalist especially knowledgeable about the medicinal use of plants, and provided medical assistance to Māori.

She died at Motueka on 28 February 1914 aged 87, having outlived her husband by nearly 19 years.

She was written about in a two-page story by her granddaughter Flora Park Cave Spurdle called "Tales my grandmother told me".

Boyce's parents were Samuel Cave and Susannah Noon, both sent to New South Wales from England as convicts. Noon was only a young girl when she was transported in 1811. An account of her life and those of the other women on the convict ship Friends, The Girl Who Stole Stockings, was published in October 2015.
