= Susannah Noon =

Susannah Noon (aka Susan Noon) (born between 1797 and 1800 in England) was the first known female convict emancipist from New South Wales to settle in the South Island of New Zealand.

== Transportation ==
Noon was about 12 years old when she was convicted of the theft of four pairs of stockings by fraudulent means from a hosiers shop in Colchester, England. She was convicted at the Essex Quarters Sessions on 30 April 1810 and sentenced to seven years’ transportation. Noon left England on the Friends convict ship bound for New South Wales in April 1811.

== Marriages ==
At the age of about 14, Noon married fellow convict William Docwra (aka Dockerell) on 25 November 1811 at St Matthews, Windsor, NSW. About 1820, the couple moved to Sydney where they ran a clothing shop at 68 George Street. Dockerell died on 22 January 1824.

On 15 October 1825, Noon married Samuel Cave (aka Charles Samuel Cave and Charles James Cave) at St James, Sydney, despite the fact that he was a newly arrived convict transported for bigamy. They had two daughters and a son; Ann, who was born on 20 November 1827, and Susannah who was born on 20 April 1830, and Charles Samuel who was born on 4 February 1835. Their third daughter Eliza, born in 1831, died as an infant.

Cave was largely an absentee husband, initially detained for further misdemeanours in the colony and then, as a cooper, working offshore in the whaling industry. During his absence, Noon lost the shop in George Street and was eventually declared insolvent.

== New Zealand ==
Cave finally gained his certificate of freedom on 17 May 1834. On 9 December 1837, Noon and her children left New South Wales with Cave on the Vanguard to go and live in a shore-based whaling station in Ocean Bay, Port Underwood, in the South Island of New Zealand.

On 24 June 1843, Noon and her husband gave a deposition to the magistrates investigating the Wairau Affray between Māori led by Te Rauparaha and the Nelson colonists led by Captain Arthur Wakefield. Te Rauparaha and his warriors had stopped at her house in Ocean Bay en route to the Wairau.

Noon and her family remained in Port Underwood until 1847 when they shifted to Nelson.

Noon died in Nelson on 30 June 1852. Her age was given as 52 but this conflicts with the Sydney records. It is known only that she was born somewhere between 1797 and 1800. Her husband remarried and later died at Richmond in 1872 aged 75.

== Literature ==
A non fiction account of Noon’s story and those of the other women of the convict ship Friends was written by Elsbeth Hardie and published in 2015 as The Girl Who Stole Stockings.
