= Betty Guard =

Early New Zealand settler (1814–1870)

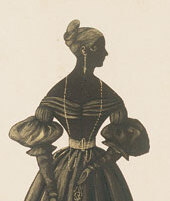
- Shadow portrait of Guard
- Born: Elizabeth Parker; 3 December 1814; Parramatta, Australia
- Died: 16 July 1870 (aged 55)
- Resting place: Kākāpō Bay, Port Underwood, New Zealand
- Occupation: Pioneer settler
- Known for: 1834 kidnapping
- Spouse: John Guard (m. 1830; died 1857)
- Children: 8

Elizabeth Guard (née Parker; 3 December 1814 – 16 July 1870) was an Australian settler of New Zealand. She is thought to have been the first woman of European descent to settle in the South Island. In 1834 she and her two children were kidnapped by local Māori people and held in captivity for four months. Her early life and these events are the subject of the 2005 novel The Captive Wife by Fiona Kidman.

== Early life and family ==
Elizabeth Parker, known as Betty, was born in Parramatta, New South Wales on 3 December 1814. Her father was a former convict, and she grew up in Sydney with her mother, stepfather and five siblings.

Around 1830, she married the former convict John Guard (also known as Jacky); she was 15, while he was 39. At the age of 16, she travelled to New Zealand on 7 November 1830, to settle at his whale hunting station at Te Awaiti on Arapaoa Island in the Tory Channel. In 1832, Jacky bought land at Kākāpō Bay, at Te Whanganui / Port Underwood, from Te Rauparaha and Te Rangihaeata; the family and whaling station moved there.

Guard is thought to have been the first woman of European descent to settle in the South Island. Her son, John, born on 1 October 1831, was the first child of European descent to be born in the South Island; she subsequently had a daughter, Louisa, in late 1833. The Guard family had some early incidents with local Māori, particularly members of the Ngāi Tahu iwi (tribe), including the pillaging of Jacky's ship Waterloo after it ran aground in 1833 and the murder of three of the whaling station's Māori workers.

In later life, John Guard Jr recalled confrontations between his father and Te Rauparaha, but that they ended up becoming good friends. Around 1832 the Guards were protected by Te Rauparaha on Kapiti Island for five weeks following threats from Ngāi Tahu.

== 1834 kidnapping ==
At the age of 19, Betty travelled with her husband, two children and brother to Sydney in January 1834. On their return voyage in April, the ship Harriet was wrecked near Taranaki. All the passengers survived, creating tents from the ship's sails. After two weeks, however, they were attacked by local Māori of the Taranaki and Ngāti Ruanui iwi, who had been supplied with gunpowder by two deserting sailors and who may have been seeking revenge for past grievances. Twelve crew members were killed, including Betty's brother, while the Guards were kidnapped. Sandra Coney writes that this event could have been retaliation for local Māori not being compensated for food.

In the confrontation Betty was nearly killed with a tomahawk, but a tortoiseshell comb in her hair saved her. She lost consciousness and awoke to an actively bleeding wound on her head. She was then brought to Te Namu pā where a Māori woman gifted her a mat to wear, and this alongside a shirt was what she would use in the coming weeks to stay warm. At this stage she was given her daughter Louisa, but she did not see her son again for some time. Two weeks later, Jacky was released along with some other men on the basis that they would return with a cask of gunpowder as a ransom. They returned to Sydney where Jacky sought the support of governor Richard Bourke.

This case became a cause célèbre in the contemporary press, with the Sydney Herald reporting in lurid detail that Betty was taken naked away into captivity, did not see her son for two months and witnessed the cannibalism of dead crew members. Other reports however said she was well-treated during her time in captivity and that she lived under the protection of the chief Oaoiti as his wife. Her survival is said to have been sustained by her love for her children, but additionally her limited knowledge of te reo Māori allowed her to remind her captors of the "rewards" they would potentially benefit from in future if they kept her alive.

On 31 August 1834, the HMS Alligator and the Isabella sailed from Sydney on a rescue mission with three officers and 65 soldiers, and joined by Jacky Guard and his men. The leader of the mission, Captain Robert Lambert, was under orders from Governor Bourke to effect the rescue by force if peaceful means were not effective. He also decided not to offer a ransom to the Māori. The mission recovered eight surviving sailors from Moturoa island on 21 September 1834, and on 25 September found Betty and her daughter at Te Namu pā. The pā was attacked and burnt down by the soldiers, Oaoiti was bayoneted and kidnapped by Jacky and his men, and Guard's Māori captors took her further along the coast to another pā at Waimate. Coney states that critics in the press at the time speculated how "if [Guard] had been killed...her would-be rescuers would have been to blame", due to their rough handling of the rescue mission.

On 1 October 1834, a prisoner exchange took place with Betty and her daughter being yielded in exchange for the return of Oaoiti. In order to rescue Guard's son, the ships attacked the pā at Waimate on 8 October. A number of Māori people were slaughtered in the confrontation. While the rescue of John Guard Jr was successful, the mission was criticised in the British House of Commons and by humanitarian organisations for using excessive force.

== Aftermath ==
Guard returned to Sydney with her husband and children. Her daughter died eight months after the events, and there were rumours that Guard gave birth to twins fathered by Oaoiti. She had her second son with Jacky Guard in November 1835, and in early 1836 the family returned to Kākāpō Bay and resettled in New Zealand.

Guard lived at Kākāpō Bay for the rest of her life, and was buried there after she died in 1870 at the age of 55. She had had five more children with Jacky, who pre-deceased her, dying in 1857. Near the end of her life she was described as "a most remarkable woman, tall and thin and very alert". In 2005 New Zealand author Fiona Kidman published The Captive Wife, a novel about the kidnapping. Guard's descendants were still living in Kākāpō Bay in 2009. The tortoiseshell comb that saved Guard's life in the attack is in the collections at Te Papa, New Zealand's national museum.
