= Tuamarina =

Town in Marlborough, New Zealand

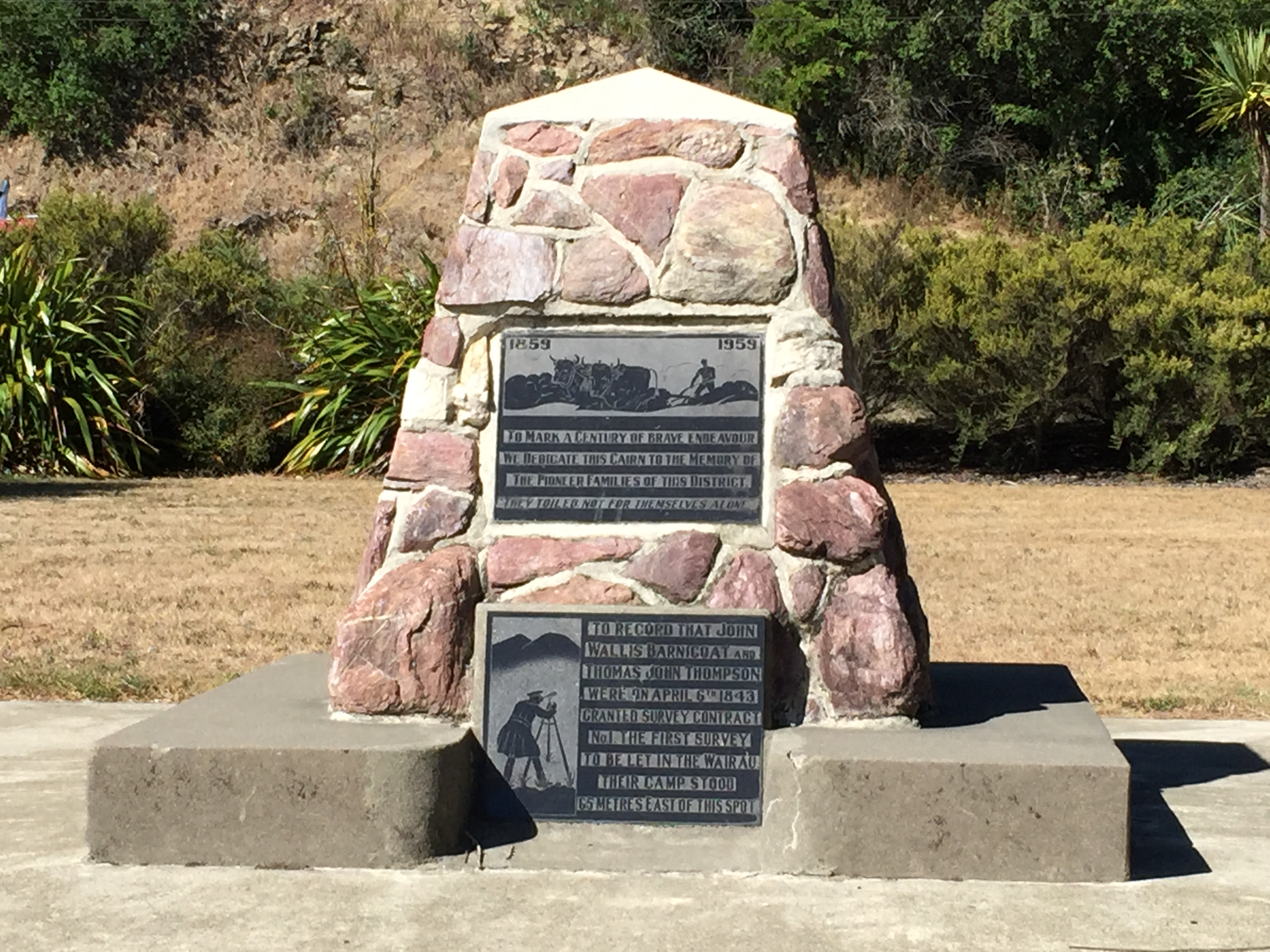
- Pioneers' Memorial in Tuamarina
- Interactive map of Tuamarina
- Coordinates: 41°25′49″S 173°57′44″E
- Country: New Zealand
- Region: Marlborough
- Ward: Wairau-Awatere General Ward; Marlborough Māori Ward
- Electorates: Kaikōura; Te Tai Tonga (Māori)

Government
  - Territorial Authority: Marlborough District Council
  - Marlborough District Mayor: Nadine Taylor
  - Kaikōura MP: Stuart Smith
  - Te Tai Tonga MP: Tākuta Ferris

Area
  - Total: 9.68 km^{2} (3.74 sq mi)

Population (June 2025)
  - Total: 240
  - Density: 25/km^{2} (64/sq mi)
- Postcode(s): 7273

Tuamarina (often spelled Tua Marina) is a small town just north of the Wairau River and a few kilometres from the Cloudy Bay coast in Marlborough, New Zealand. The Tuamarina River flows south through the settlement and joins the Wairau River. State Highway 1 runs through the town, with Blenheim 10 km to the south and Picton 18 km to the north.

The name is a corruption of the Māori word Tuamarino, which means 'the calm beyond'. The Wairau Affray, with 26 deaths, occurred in the area in 1843.

Dairy farming is the major economic activity. The original factory was the Waitohi Co-op, which amalgamated with the Koromiko cheese factory and the Rai Valley Co-op to form the Marlborough Cheese Company in 1981. The new company continued Waitohi's long history, winning a number of awards. It was taken over by Fonterra Dairy Company in 1999 and the factory destroyed by fire in 2004.

The Wairau Plain is prone to flooding, and river conservation is necessary to keep the river under control. Significant floods have occurred in the area, such as one in December 1939.

== Demographics ==
Tuamarina is described by Stats NZ as a rural settlement. It covers 9.68 km^{2} (3.74 sq mi) and had an estimated population of 240 as of June 2025, with a population density of 25 people per km^{2}. It is part of the larger Tuamarina statistical area.

Historical population for Tuamarina settlement
Year	Pop.	±% p.a.
2006	267	—
2013	222	−2.60%
2018	237	+1.32%
2023	249	+0.99%

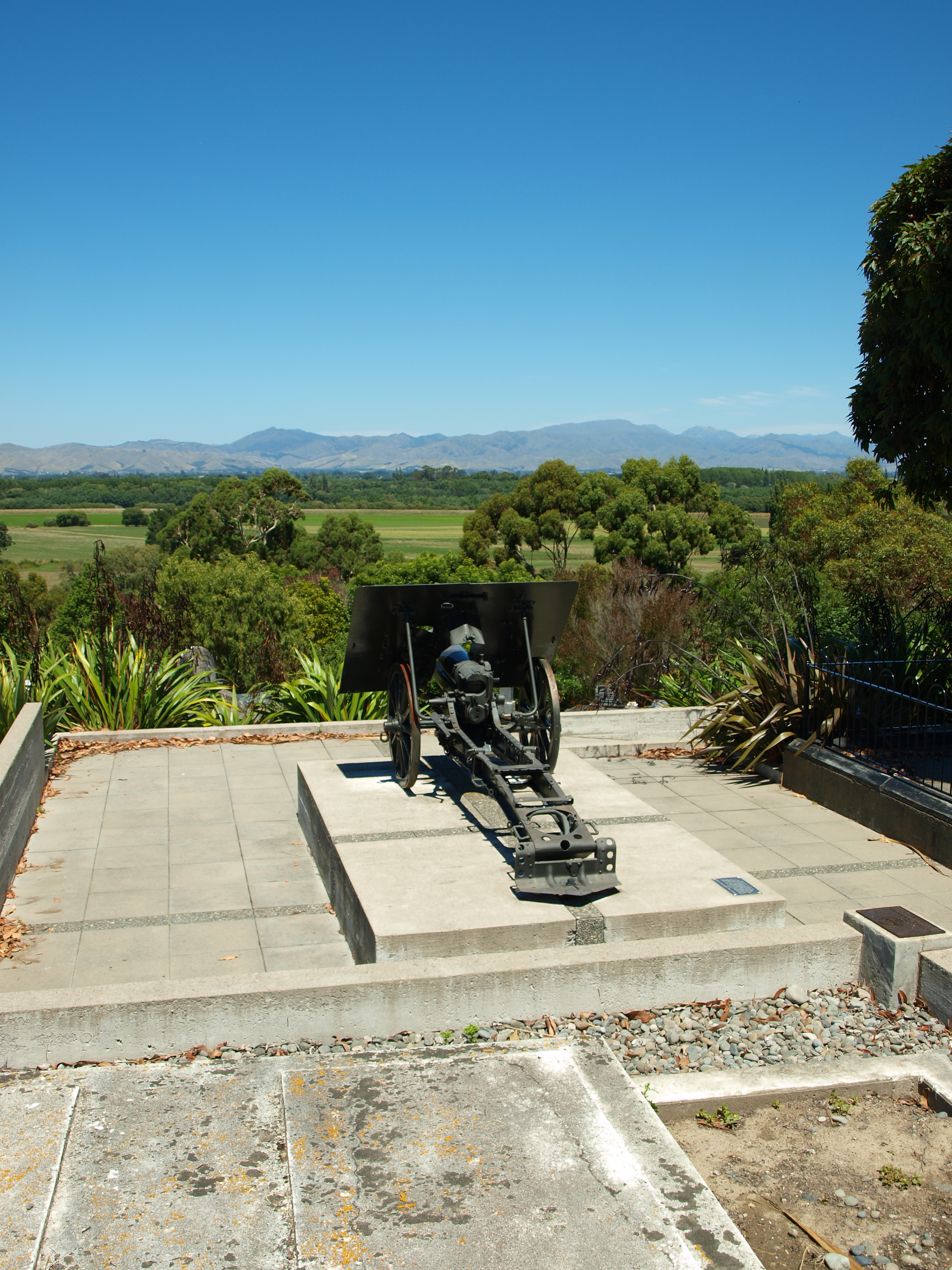
Tuamarina Cemetery Skoda Cannon

Tuamarina had a population of 249 in the 2023 New Zealand census, an increase of 12 people (5.1%) since the 2018 census, and an increase of 27 people (12.2%) since the 2013 census. There were 126 males and 123 females in 96 dwellings. 3.6% of people identified as LGBTIQ+. The median age was 46.0 years (compared with 38.1 years nationally). There were 45 people (18.1%) aged under 15 years, 30 (12.0%) aged 15 to 29, 129 (51.8%) aged 30 to 64, and 45 (18.1%) aged 65 or older.

People could identify as more than one ethnicity. The results were 91.6% European (Pākehā); 15.7% Māori; 1.2% Pasifika; 3.6% Asian; 1.2% Middle Eastern, Latin American and African New Zealanders (MELAA); and 4.8% other, which includes people giving their ethnicity as "New Zealander". English was spoken by 98.8%, Māori by 1.2%, and other languages by 6.0%. No language could be spoken by 1.2% (e.g. too young to talk). The percentage of people born overseas was 13.3, compared with 28.8% nationally.

Religious affiliations were 21.7% Christian, 1.2% Māori religious beliefs, 1.2% Buddhist, 2.4% New Age, and 1.2% other religions. People who answered that they had no religion were 67.5%, and 7.2% of people did not answer the census question.

Of those at least 15 years old, 30 (14.7%) people had a bachelor's or higher degree, 123 (60.3%) had a post-high school certificate or diploma, and 45 (22.1%) people exclusively held high school qualifications. The median income was $48,800, compared with $41,500 nationally. 21 people (10.3%) earned over $100,000 compared to 12.1% nationally. The employment status of those at least 15 was 129 (63.2%) full-time, 24 (11.8%) part-time, and 6 (2.9%) unemployed.

=== Tuamarina statistical area ===
Tuamarina statistical area surrounds the settlement and also includes Rārangi. It covers 167.84 km^{2} (64.80 sq mi). It had an estimated population of 1,350 as of June 2025, with a population density of 8.0 people per km^{2}.

Historical population for Tuamarina statistical area
Year	Pop.	±% p.a.
2006	1,092	—
2013	1,185	+1.17%
2018	1,263	+1.28%
2023	1,341	+1.21%

Tuamarina statistical area had a population of 1,341 in the 2023 New Zealand census, an increase of 78 people (6.2%) since the 2018 census, and an increase of 156 people (13.2%) since the 2013 census. There were 681 males, 657 females, and 3 people of other genders in 510 dwellings. 2.7% of people identified as LGBTIQ+. The median age was 47.4 years (compared with 38.1 years nationally). There were 237 people (17.7%) aged under 15 years, 177 (13.2%) aged 15 to 29, 651 (48.5%) aged 30 to 64, and 276 (20.6%) aged 65 or older.

People could identify as more than one ethnicity. The results were 91.9% European (Pākehā); 13.2% Māori; 1.3% Pasifika; 1.6% Asian; 1.6% Middle Eastern, Latin American and African New Zealanders (MELAA); and 3.1% other, which includes people giving their ethnicity as "New Zealander". English was spoken by 98.4%, Māori by 1.8%, and other languages by 6.3%. No language could be spoken by 1.6% (e.g. too young to talk). New Zealand Sign Language was known by 0.2%. The percentage of people born overseas was 18.1, compared with 28.8% nationally.

Religious affiliations were 23.0% Christian, 0.2% Māori religious beliefs, 0.7% Buddhist, 0.7% New Age, and 0.9% other religions. People who answered that they had no religion were 65.5%, and 8.7% of people did not answer the census question.

Of those at least 15 years old, 225 (20.4%) people had a bachelor's or higher degree, 657 (59.5%) had a post-high school certificate or diploma, and 225 (20.4%) people exclusively held high school qualifications. The median income was $44,700, compared with $41,500 nationally. 132 people (12.0%) earned over $100,000 compared to 12.1% nationally. The employment status of those at least 15 was 567 (51.4%) full-time, 189 (17.1%) part-time, and 12 (1.1%) unemployed.

== Education ==
Tua Marina School is a coeducational full primary (years 1–8) school with a decile rating of 7 and a roll of 94 as of July 2026. It opened in 1871. The school celebrated its 125th anniversary in 1996.

== Notable people ==
- Eileen Duggan, 1894–1972, poet.
