= The Captive Wife =

2005 novel by Fiona Kidman

The Captive Wife is a 2005 novel by New Zealand writer Fiona Kidman. It is about the 1835 kidnapping of settler Betty Guard by Māori people in the South Island of New Zealand. The novel covers Guard's captivity both literally (through the kidnapping) and figuratively (in her marriage to John Guard, who was also known as "Jacky").

Mike Crean, reviewing the book for The Press, said it was an "example of the best in New Zealand historical fiction", with Kidman bringing "together into a continuous narrative the series of dramatic happenings that comprised the early life of Betty Guard".

Kidman met some of Guard's descendants in the 1950s when her husband taught at Arapaoa Island. She was later assisted by them in writing the book, and has said that she had to write about Guard's story because "this was a story that epitomised so many aspects of women’s lives – being anchored in one place, discovering one’s sexuality in surprising ways, and so on".

== Awards and honours ==
The novel was a runner-up in the fiction category and received the Readers' Choice award (shared with Maurice Gee) at the 2006 New Zealand Book Awards.
