= Port Underwood =

Te Whanganui / Port Underwood
- Te Whanganui (Māori)
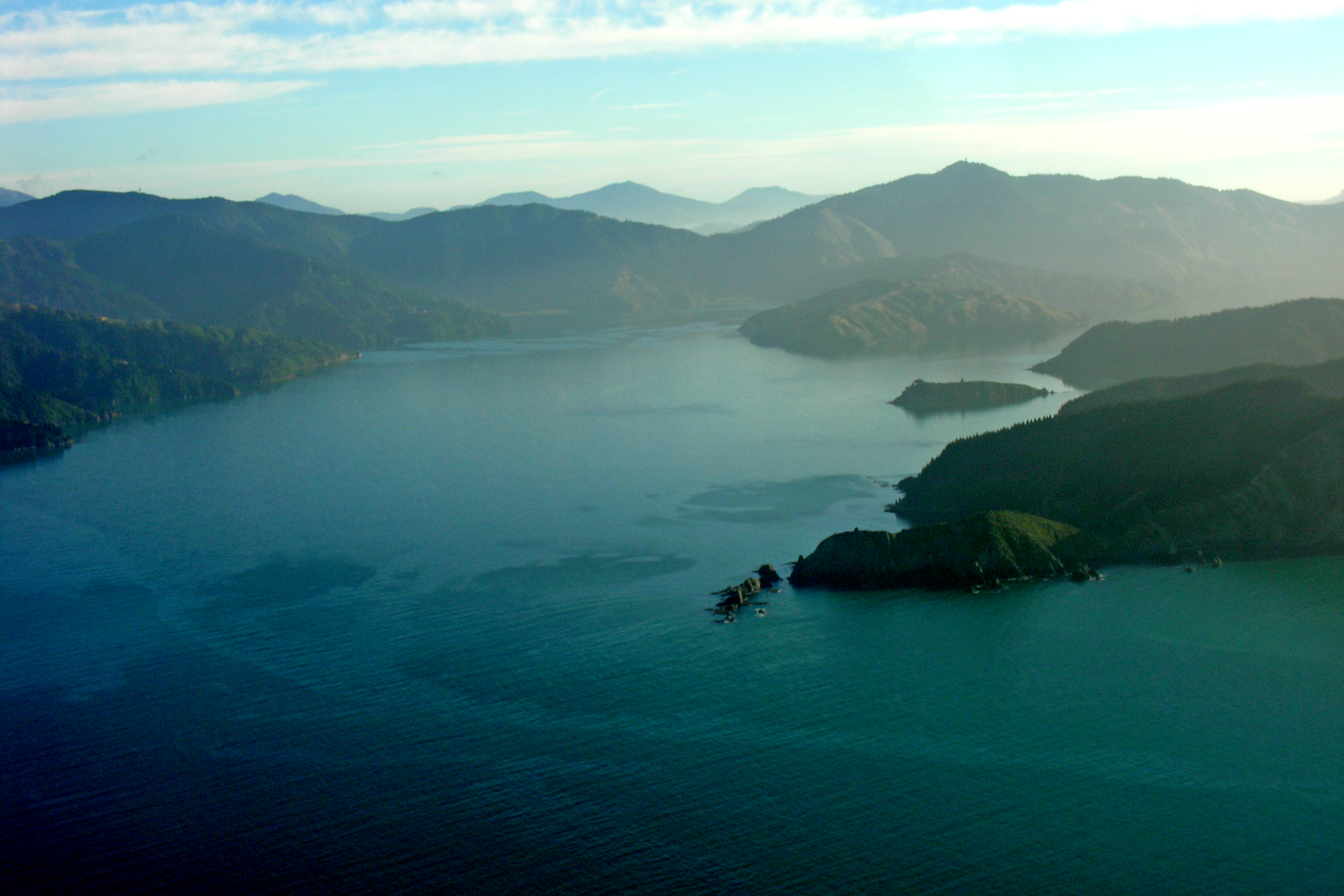
- Te Whanganui / Port Underwood

- Location of Te Whanganui / Port Underwood
- Location: Marlborough region
- Coordinates: 41°20′S 174°07′E
- Etymology: Big Harbour in te reo Māori, European name after Joseph Underwood
- Part of: Te Koko-o-Kupe / Cloudy Bay
- Ocean/sea sources: Pacific Ocean
- Max. length: 9.3 kilometres (5.8 mi)
- Max. width: 3.5 kilometres (2.2 mi)
- Islands: Horahora Kakahu Island

Te Whanganui / Port Underwood is a sheltered harbour which forms the north-east extension of Te Koko-o-Kupe / Cloudy Bay at the northeast of New Zealand's South Island, on the east coast of the Marlborough Sounds. With only a relatively narrow entrance to the south-south-east it is sheltered from almost all winds. Originally considered part of Cloudy Bay, the port was named after Joseph Underwood of the shipping firm Kabel and Underwood in the early 19th century.

There is evidence of a large Māori population at various times prior to European arrival in New Zealand. In the 1820s the local Rangitane were defeated by the Ngāti Toa chief Te Rauparaha. Sealers first visited about 1826 and were followed immediately by whalers. John Guard, who had started a whaling station in Tory Channel the previous year, set up a subsidiary station at Kakapo Bay in 1828. By 1840 there were approximately 150 Europeans in the area, probably the largest concentration in the South Island at that time. Large numbers of southern right whales and humpback whales were hunted in the bay, resulting in destroying these populations and rarities of their sightings in the bay nowadays.

On 16 June 1840, HMS Herald arrived with Major Thomas Banbury on board bringing the Treaty of Waitangi for the South Island chiefs to sign. This took place on Horahora-Kakahu Island just offshore from the eastern shoreline. The only European to sign the Treaty as one of the cedants, Joseph Thomas, son-in-law of Te Rauparaha's elder brother Nohorua, signed on 16 June. Nouhora himself, initially reluctant to sign, did so the following day. A commemorative bronze plaque marking the occasion was unveiled here on 3 October 1964.

The name of the harbour was officially altered to Te Whanganui / Port Underwood in August 2014.

== Demographics ==
Port Underwood locality covers 126.50 km^{2} (48.84 sq mi). It is part of the larger Marlborough Sounds East statistical area.

Historical population
Year	Pop.	±% p.a.
2013	162	—
2018	156	−0.75%
2023	189	+3.91%

Port Underwood had a population of 189 in the 2023 New Zealand census, an increase of 33 people (21.2%) since the 2018 census, and an increase of 27 people (16.7%) since the 2013 census. There were 102 males, 84 females, and 3 people of other genders in 90 dwellings. 3.2% of people identified as LGBTIQ+. The median age was 58.6 years (compared with 38.1 years nationally). There were 15 people (7.9%) aged under 15 years, 18 (9.5%) aged 15 to 29, 117 (61.9%) aged 30 to 64, and 42 (22.2%) aged 65 or older.

People could identify as more than one ethnicity. The results were 92.1% European (Pākehā), 11.1% Māori, 1.6% Pasifika, 3.2% Asian, and 3.2% other, which includes people giving their ethnicity as "New Zealander". English was spoken by 100.0%, Māori by 4.8%, and other languages by 7.9%. The percentage of people born overseas was 23.8, compared with 28.8% nationally.

The sole religious affiliation given was 23.8% Christian. People who answered that they had no religion were 63.5%, and 11.1% of people did not answer the census question.

Of those at least 15 years old, 45 (25.9%) people had a bachelor's or higher degree, 93 (53.4%) had a post-high school certificate or diploma, and 45 (25.9%) people exclusively held high school qualifications. The median income was $31,500, compared with $41,500 nationally. 15 people (8.6%) earned over $100,000 compared to 12.1% nationally. The employment status of those at least 15 was 72 (41.4%) full-time and 36 (20.7%) part-time.

== Education ==
Port Underwood School opened in 1882 and was extant in 1905.

Ocean Bay School opened in 1909 and closed in 1924.

Hakahaka School opened in 1912 and was extant in 1921.

There were schools at Kākāpō Bay (1898-1919), Opihi Bay (1912-1916), Oyster Bay (1888-1897), Robin Hood Bay (1886-1917), and Whangataura / Hakana (1921-1931).

== Notable people ==
- Ann Boyce, pioneer and herbalist.
- Betty Guard (1814–1870), early settler, wife of John Guard
- John "Jacky" Guard (1790/92–1858), whaler and trader, husband of Betty Guard, landed in Kākāpō Bay
