= Tuamarina River =

River on New Zealand's South Island

Location
- County: New Zealand
- Island: South Island
- Region: Marlborough

Physical characteristics
- Mouth: Wairau River
  - location: Near Tuamarina
  - coordinates: 41°26′S 173°58′E

Tuamarina River is a river in Marlborough in the South Island of New Zealand. It flows into the Wairau River just south of Tuamarina.
