= Arapawa sheep =

Breed of sheep

Arapawa
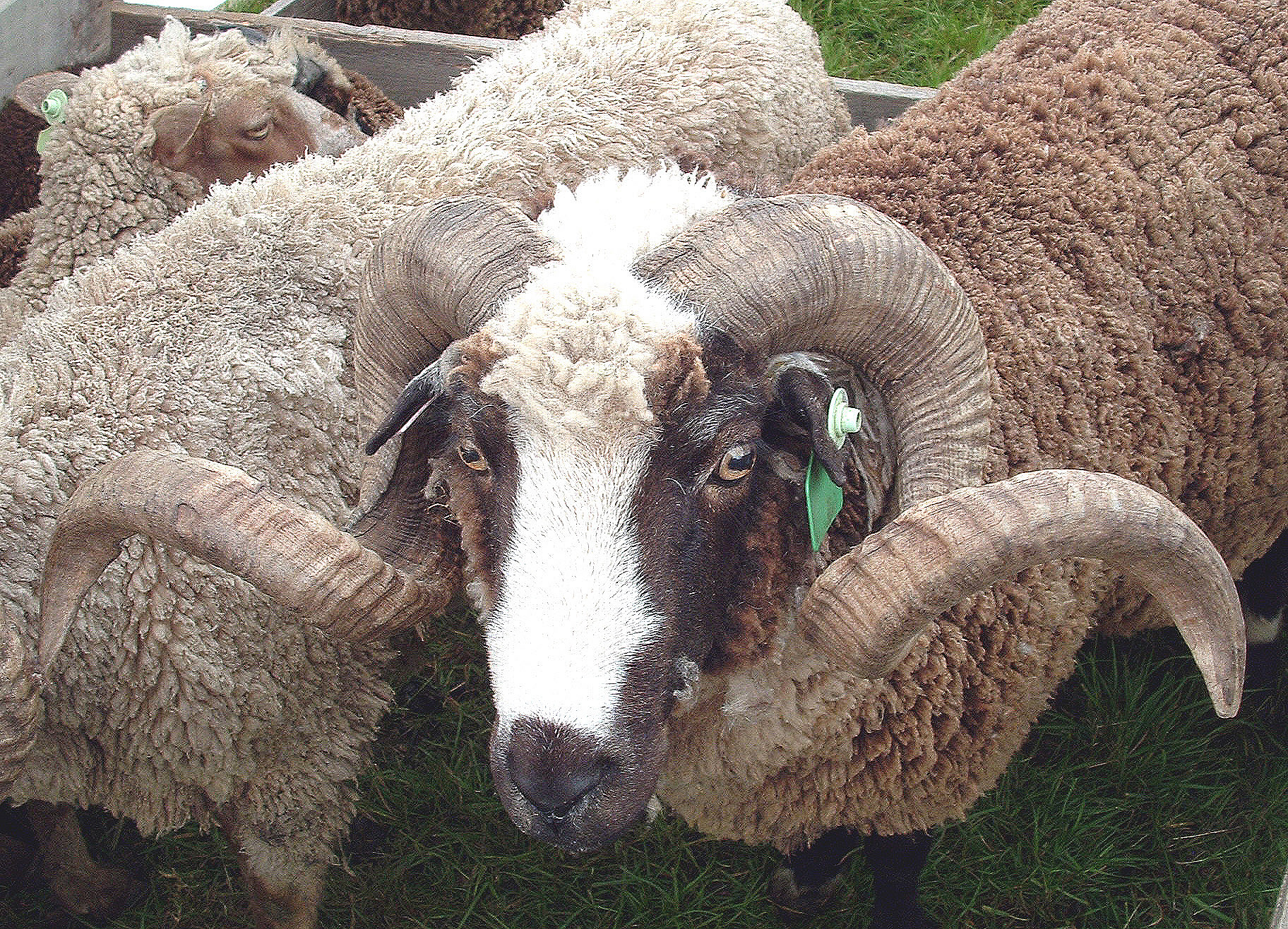
- Conservation status: Rare
- Other names: Māori: Arapawa
- Country of origin: Arapaoa Island, New Zealand
- Distribution: Arapaoa Island
- Type: Feral sheep
- Use: Wool

Traits
- Wool color: Black, white
- Face color: Black, white
- Horn status: Rams are horned and ewes are polled (hornless)

The Arapawa sheep is a breed of feral sheep found primarily on Arapaoa Island (formerly called Arapawa Island) in the Marlborough Sounds, New Zealand. The New Zealand Rare Breeds Conservation Society classifies it as "rare". This breed is raised primarily for wool.

There have been many theories about the origin of the sheep. It was once thought that they were most likely descendants of Merinos introduced from Australia in 1867. Other theories were that they are from the Middle East introduced by whalers who were based on the island from the 1820s, or even that they were brought by a Spanish galleon as early as the 16th century.

Genetic research has shown that their closest relative is the Florida Gulf Coast Native sheep. This supports the idea that they were brought by whalers in the early 19th century.

== Characteristics ==
Ewes have horns, and rams have long spiral horns that often measure over 1 metre (3 ft). The fiber is of Merino-like fineness.

Due to living in a hostile and very steep terrain, this breed often looks hunched over as they carry their head and tail down most often. They have a light build and long legs making them a rather active breed. The head and face are narrow and well-defined while the ears are slender. Most Arapawa sheep are entirely black. However, quite often, white points are displayed, and rarely an all-white Arapawa can be observed. "Cocktail" Arapawas refers to those that are white spotted.
