= Marlborough Sounds Important Bird Areas =

Sites in New Zealand

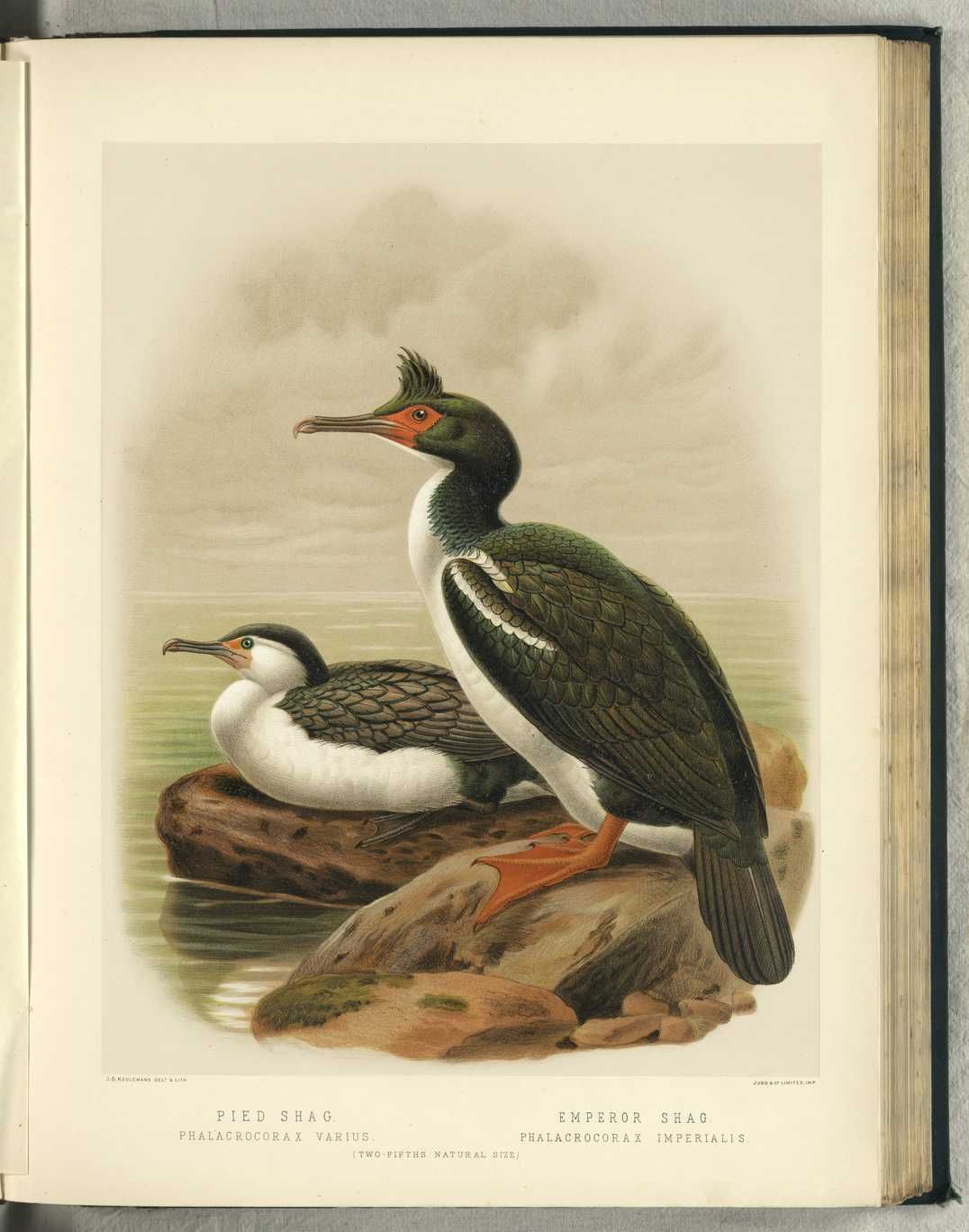
Rough-faced shag (right) with a pied cormorant

The Marlborough Sounds Important Bird Areas are four distinct sites comprising several small, rocky islets contained within an area with a maximum linear extent of 40 km, in New Zealand. They lie close to Cook Strait in the outer Marlborough Sounds at the northern end of the South Island. The sites are Duffers Reef, Sentinel Rock, White Rocks and the Trio Islands. They have been identified as Important Bird Areas (IBAs) by BirdLife International because they hold the only known colonies, and encompass the entire breeding range, of the vulnerable rough-faced shag (also known as the New Zealand king shag).

== IBAs ==
- Duffers Reef 40°57′15″S 174°02′30″E is the continuation of the main ridge of Forsyth Island at the entrance to Pelorus Sound / Te Hoiere. The reef is about 1 km long and consists of rocky islets up to 30 m high. 230 shags were counted in 2002.
- Sentinel Rock 40°52′54″S 174°08′26″E is an isolated rock lying some 3 km east of, the Chetwode Islands. About 600 shags were present in 2002.
- Trio Islands 40°50′15″S 173°59′50″E comprise three islets lying 5 km east of D'Urville Island. 211 shags were counted in 1997.
- White Rocks 41°04′35″S 174°21′39″E comprise a small group of wave-washed rocks. 141 shags were counted in 2002.
