= Wairau Hydro Scheme =

Hydroelectric proposal in New Zealand

- Country: New Zealand
- Location: Wairau River
- Coordinates: 41.615°S 173.398°E
- Status: Proposed
- Owner: TrustPower

Thermal power station
- Primary fuel: Hydro

Power generation
- Nameplate capacity: 70 MW (94,000 hp)

The Wairau Hydro Scheme is a canal based hydroelectric project proposed by TrustPower on the Wairau River in Marlborough, New Zealand. The $280 million project would divert up to 60% of the river through 49 kilometres (30 mi) of canals to generate up to 70 megawatts (94,000 hp) of electricity.

== Resource consents ==
Resource consents for this project were granted in 2008. This decision was appealed to the Environment Court, which in 2010 decided in favour of the project. However, TrustPower put the project on hold in 2012, due to low electricity prices combined with rising construction costs. Consents for the scheme lapsed in 2021.

== See also ==
- List of power stations in New Zealand
- Electricity sector in New Zealand
