= Rārangi =

Town in Marlborough, New Zealand

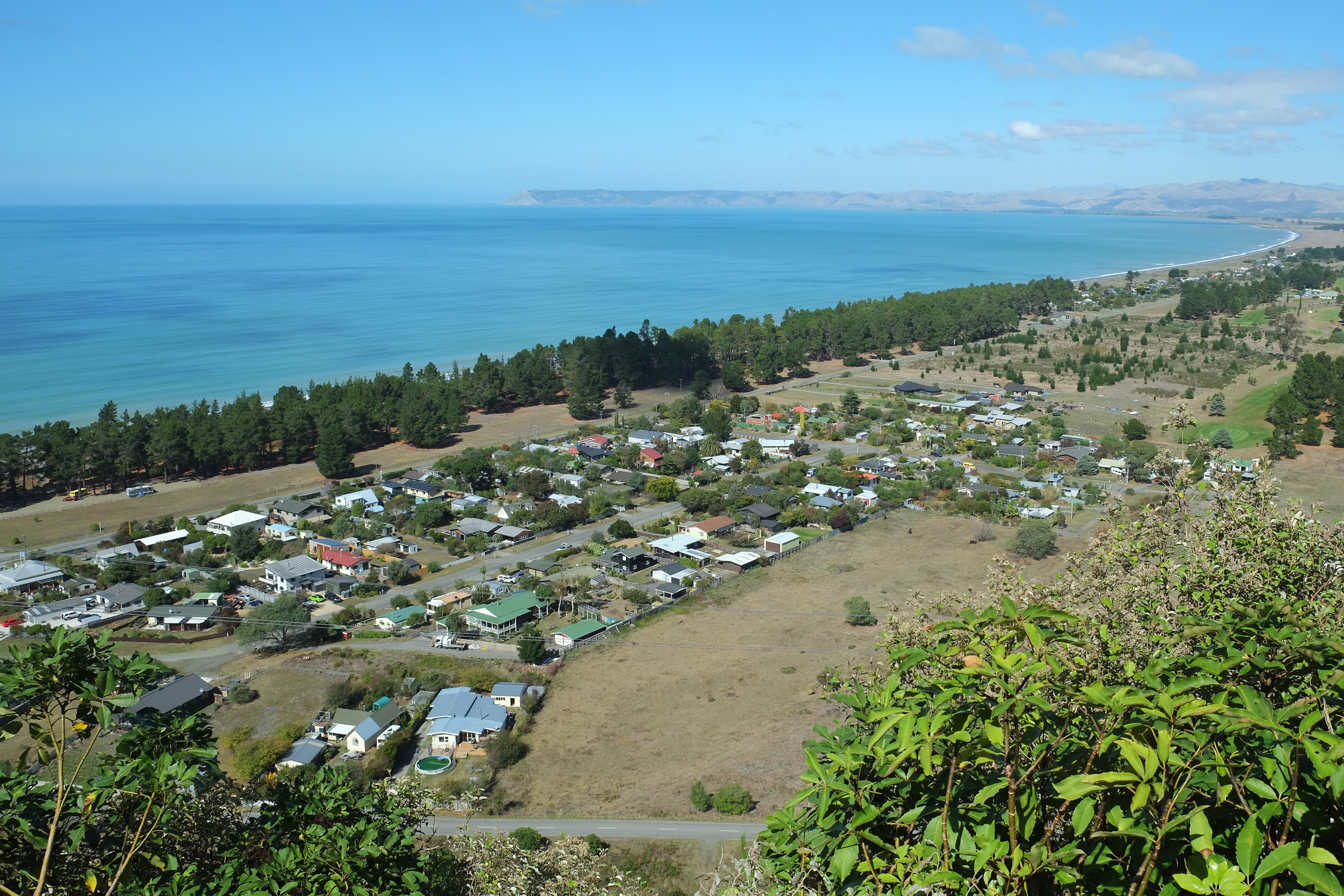
- Interactive map of Rārangi
- Coordinates: 41°23′39″S 174°2′42″E
- Country: New Zealand
- Region: Marlborough
- Ward: Wairau-Awatere General Ward; Marlborough Māori Ward
- Electorates: Kaikōura; Te Tai Tonga (Māori)

Government
  - Territorial Authority: Marlborough District Council
  - Marlborough District Mayor: Nadine Taylor
  - Kaikōura MP: Stuart Smith

Area
  - Total: 4.82 km^{2} (1.86 sq mi)

Population (June 2025)
  - Total: 680
  - Density: 140/km^{2} (370/sq mi)

Rārangi is a very small town in the South Island of New Zealand which is approximately 15 minutes drive to the north-east of Blenheim, on the coast of Cloudy Bay.

A macron was officially added to the name in May 2021.

== Demographics ==
Rārangi is described by Stats NZ as a rural settlement. It covers 4.82 km^{2} (1.86 sq mi) and had an estimated population of 680 as of June 2025, with a population density of 141 people per km^{2}. It is included in the Tuamarina statistical area.

Historical population
Year	Pop.	±% p.a.
2006	492	—
2013	573	+2.20%
2018	675	+3.33%
2023	696	+0.61%

Rārangi had a population of 696 in the 2023 New Zealand census, an increase of 21 people (3.1%) since the 2018 census, and an increase of 123 people (21.5%) since the 2013 census. There were 342 males and 354 females in 273 dwellings. 2.6% of people identified as LGBTIQ+. The median age was 49.9 years (compared with 38.1 years nationally). There were 111 people (15.9%) aged under 15 years, 81 (11.6%) aged 15 to 29, 339 (48.7%) aged 30 to 64, and 165 (23.7%) aged 65 or older.

People could identify as more than one ethnicity. The results were 91.8% European (Pākehā); 13.8% Māori; 1.7% Pasifika; 1.3% Asian; 2.2% Middle Eastern, Latin American and African New Zealanders (MELAA); and 1.7% other, which includes people giving their ethnicity as "New Zealander". English was spoken by 98.7%, Māori by 2.2%, and other languages by 8.2%. No language could be spoken by 0.9% (e.g. too young to talk). The percentage of people born overseas was 22.0, compared with 28.8% nationally.

Religious affiliations were 22.4% Christian, 0.4% Buddhist, 0.4% New Age, and 0.9% other religions. People who answered that they had no religion were 66.4%, and 9.1% of people did not answer the census question.

Of those at least 15 years old, 126 (21.5%) people had a bachelor's or higher degree, 339 (57.9%) had a post-high school certificate or diploma, and 114 (19.5%) people exclusively held high school qualifications. The median income was $47,500, compared with $41,500 nationally. 84 people (14.4%) earned over $100,000 compared to 12.1% nationally. The employment status of those at least 15 was 276 (47.2%) full-time, 102 (17.4%) part-time, and 3 (0.5%) unemployed.
