= Fiona Kidman =

New Zealand writer (born 1940)

Dame Fiona Kidman DNZM OBE
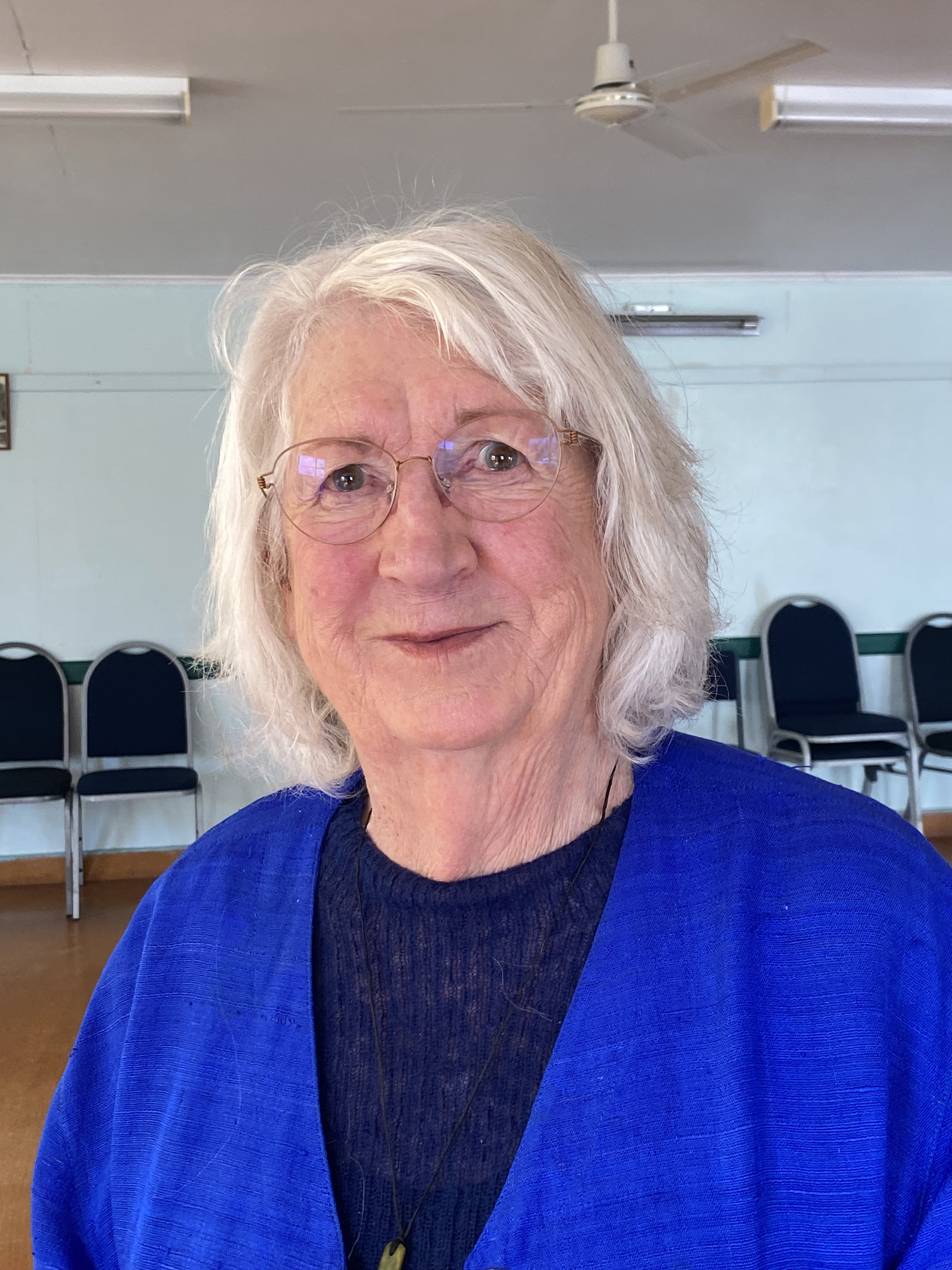
- Kidman in 2025
- Born: Fiona Judith Eakin; 26 March 1940 (age 86); Hāwera, New Zealand
- Occupations: Novelist; poet; scriptwriter; short story writer
- Notable work: A Breed of Women (1979); This Mortal Boy (2018)
- Spouse: Ernest Ian Richard Kidman (m. 1960; died 2017)
- Children: 2

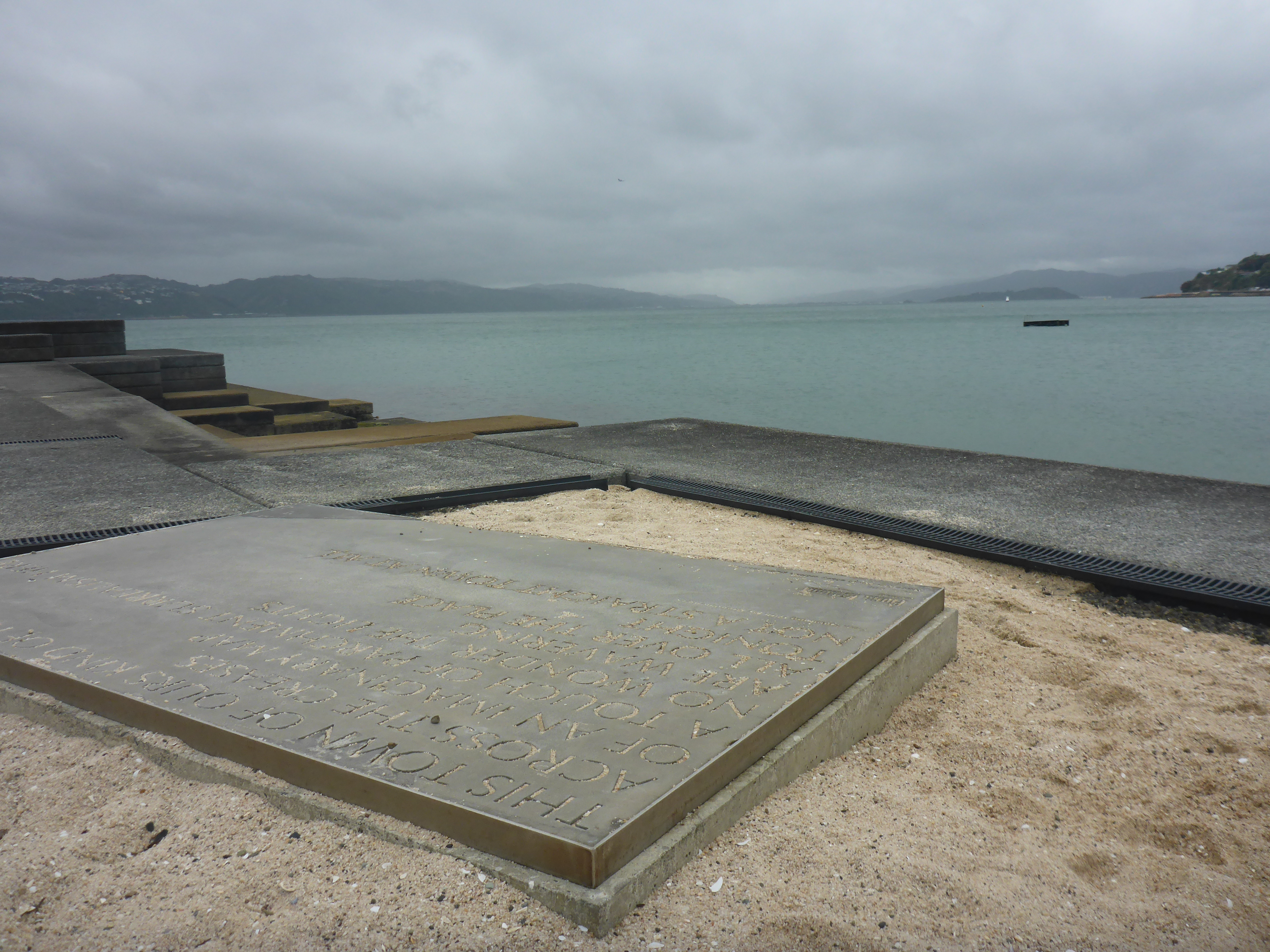
The quotation by Kidman on the Wellington Writers Walk, Wellington, New Zealand

Dame Fiona Judith Kidman DNZM OBE (née Eakin; born 26 March 1940) is a New Zealand novelist, poet, scriptwriter and short story writer. She grew up in Northland, and worked as a librarian and a freelance journalist early in her career. She began writing novels in the late 1970s, with her works often featuring young women subverting society's expectations, inspired by her involvement in the women's liberation movement. Her first novel, A Breed of Women (1979), caused controversy for this reason but became a bestseller in New Zealand. Over the course of her career, Kidman has written eleven novels, seven short-story collections, two volumes of her memoirs and six collections of poetry. Her works explore women's lives and issues of social justice, and often feature historical settings.

Kidman is an influential figure in New Zealand literature and has been active in New Zealand's literary community, including by serving as the president of the New Zealand Society of Authors and the New Zealand Book Council and as a creative writing tutor. She has won a number of prestigious awards over the course of her career, including a Prime Minister's Award for Literary Achievement and the top award for fiction at the New Zealand Book Awards on two occasions.

== Early life and career ==
Kidman was born in Hāwera, New Zealand, on 26 March 1940. She was the only child of Flora (née Small) and Hugh Eakin, and as a newborn baby she was briefly hospitalised with a milk allergy. After World War Two, her parents used their savings to put a deposit on a cheap block of land in Kerikeri. They stayed for a while on a British army soldier's farm in Kerikeri, where her parents worked as servants for the family, but later moved into an army hut on their land at the end of Darwin Road, where they lived for seven years. She attended Kerikeri Primary School followed by Northland College, where she has said she won the school English prize when she was aged 13. After her father received an inheritance, the three of them moved to a farm in Waipu. She attended Waipu District High School for two years. After leaving high school at the age of 15, she worked at first in the local drapery store and subsequently as a librarian in Rotorua.

She married Ian Kidman in 1960, and the couple had two children. He was awarded an MNZM for his service working with landmine victims in Cambodia, and died in 2017. She began working as a freelance journalist in the 1960s, and was mentored by Bruce Mason and William Austin in theatre and radio theatre. In 1970 the couple moved to Wellington with their children where she worked as a writer, screenwriter and television producer. When asked why she became a writer, she has said:

I married when I was twenty, had my first child when I was twenty-two, and we were poor. I had stopped work when my daughter was born, because that was the expectation in the 1960s. I offered myself to the local paper as a book reviewer and they took me up on it. I wrote scores, maybe hundreds of reviews. I was offered more work and it just grew from there.

== Literary career ==
=== Novels ===
Kidman's first novel, A Breed of Women, was published in 1979. It was a feminist novel about a young woman defying society's expectations during the 1970s, with roots in Kidman's involvement in the New Zealand women's liberation movement. Due to its controversial subject matter and depictions of sex, it was banned by some schools and libraries, which led to increased sales. Kidman was termed "filthy Fiona" by some commentators. It was followed by Mandarin Summer (1981) and Paddy's Puzzle (1983, also published as In a Clear Light in the United States in 1985), both narrated by young girls growing up in New Zealand. Her historical novel, The Book of Secrets (1987), followed three generations of women from Nova Scotia to Australia to Waipu, and the influence on their lives of the preacher Norman McLeod, a real historical figure. In the 1990s her works continued to deal with serious subject matter: True Stars (1990) was a crime novel criticising New Zealand's right-wing economic policies in the 1980s, described by academic Terry Sturm as the "most important political novel" in New Zealand in this period, and Ricochet Baby (1996) was about the impacts of postnatal depression on the sufferer and her family.

Kidman's novels often feature female main characters, a realistic style, and lower-middle-class families. They explore the lives of women and of those who are outsiders in conformist societies. She is deeply interested in issues of social justice. Her novel Songs from the Violet Cafe (2003) was set in both Rotorua and Cambodia. A review in The Dominion Post described it as "contain[ing] much potential sensation — domestic violence, illicit sexual connections, deaths and disappearances, and the desolation and venality of a country at war — but there's also a wry humour, every intense emotion and extreme event filtered through Kidman's cool precise prose". The Captive Wife (2005) is a historical novel about the kidnapping of Betty Guard in the 1830s, while The Infinite Air (2013) is a fictional account of the life of aviator Jean Batten. As part of the writing process for The Infinite Air she flew in a Tiger Moth plane to have a better understanding of Batten's experiences. Her tenth novel, All Day at the Movies (2016), is a family saga focussed on the life of women and changes in social attitudes across 55 years in New Zealand.

This Mortal Boy (2018) is about Paddy Black or the Jukebox Killer, a 20-year-old Irishman who was convicted of murder after a fight with another young man at a milk bar in 1955. Kidman has said the book emerged from "an interest in how some young men live their lives, believing they are immortal, yet one terrible mistake can change everything for them and their families"; she had subsequently come across an article about Black and remembered the outbreak of moral panic about teenagers in the 1950s in New Zealand following the Mazengarb Report: "I knew I was hooked, that I couldn't get away from Albert, or Paddy, as he was known. I knew I would write a novel." Craig Sisterson in the New Zealand Listener said of the novel: "This is a tale about violent acts that is infused with humanity and compassion. And although it may be set more than half a century ago, there's a lot here that seems relevant to our modern times."

=== Other work ===
In addition to her novels, Kidman has published seven short story collections, including Mrs Dixon and Friends (1982), Unsuitable Friends (1988) and The Foreign Woman (1993), and six poetry collections, including Honey and Bitters (1975), On the Tightrope (1978), Going to the Chathams: Poems 1977–84 (1985) and Wakeful Nights: Poems Selected and New (1991). Her poems are often autobiographical in nature and feature feminist themes. She has published two volumes of her memoirs: At the End of Darwin Road (2008) and Beside the Dark Pool (2009). Other works include the editing of several fiction anthologies and works for radio, such as the play Search for Sister Blue (1975). Her works have been translated into several languages including French, German, Italian and Romanian.

Kidman is active in the literary community, serving as the first secretary of the New Zealand Book Council in 1972, the National President of the New Zealand Society of Authors (including PEN NZ) from 1981 to 1983, and the President of the New Zealand Book Council from 1992 to 1995. While working with the New Zealand Book Council she founded several programmes including a Writers in Schools programme and (together with Christopher Pugsley) Words on Wheels. She has described the New Zealand Book Council as "a concept which held such a profound vision for books in our lives". In 1988, she founded and ran the Fiona Kidman Creative Writing School, which is now part of Whitireia Community Polytechnic. From 2001 to 2016, she was a founding Trustee of the Randell Cottage Writers Trust and is now a Trustee Emerita. She is one of fifteen Fellows of the Academy of New Zealand Literature, an invitation extended to writers with "an important body of work and distinguished career".

== Awards and honours ==
Kidman has received awards and honours since the beginning of her career, including the Ngaio Marsh Award for a television play in 1971, the New Outlook Short Story Award in 1985, a 1988 Victoria University writing fellowship, an Arts Council Award for Achievement in 1988, and the Scholarship in Letters on a number of occasions. At the New Zealand Book Awards she received the award for fiction for The Book of Secrets in 1988. In the 1988 New Year Honours, Kidman was made an Officer of the Order of the British Empire, for services to literature. She was appointed a Dame Companion of the New Zealand Order of Merit in the 1998 New Year Honours. At the 2001 Montana New Zealand Book Awards she received the A.W. Reed Lifetime Achievement Award.

Her novel The Captive Wife (2005) was runner-up for the top fiction prize and a joint winner of the Readers' Choice award at the 2006 Montana New Zealand Book Awards. In 2006 she received the Katherine Mansfield Memorial Fellowship which enabled her to spend time writing in Menton, France. She was the 2008 Creative New Zealand Michael King Fellow, and the New Zealand Society of Authors President of Honour in 2008/2009.

On 27 October 2009, at a function at the French Residence in Wellington, she was awarded two significant honours for her long and distinguished literary career, and her close association with French culture: the Chevalier de l’Ordre des Arts et des Lettres (Knight of the Order of Arts and Letters) and Chevalier of the French Legion of Honour (Knight of the French Legion of Honour). Her short story collection The Trouble With Fire (2011) was shortlisted for the fiction prize at the 2012 New Zealand Book Awards, as well as shortlisted for the Frank O'Connor International Short Story Award.

In 2011 she received the Prime Minister's Award for Literary Achievement in fiction. In 2017, she was the Honoured New Zealand Writer at the Auckland Writers Festival, selected by the New Zealand Society of Authors. This Mortal Boy (2018) received the NZ$53,000 Acorn Foundation Fiction Prize at the 2019 Ockham New Zealand Book Awards, the NZ Booklovers Award for Best Adult Fiction Book and the NZSA Heritage Book Award for Fiction. It also received the award for best novel at the 2019 Ngaio Marsh Awards. In 2021 she received the inaugural University of Otago Centre for Irish and Scottish Studies (CISS) Irish Writers Fellowship.

=== Decorations ===
- Dame Companion of the New Zealand Order of Merit (DNZM) – 1998
- Officer of the Most Excellent Order of the British Empire (OBE) – 1988
- Chevalier of the Legion of Honour (France) – 2009
- Chevalier of the Order of Arts and Letters (France) – 2009

== Selected works ==
=== Novels, short-story collections and non-fiction ===
- A Breed of Women (1979)
- Mandarin Summer (1981)
- Mrs Dixon & Friend (1982, short story collection)
- Paddy's Puzzle (1983) (USA title: In the Clear Light)
- Gone North (1984, non-fiction)
- The Book of Secrets (1987)
- Unsuitable Friends (1988, short story collection)
- Wellington (1989, non-fiction)
- True Stars (1990)
- The Foreign Woman (1994, short story collection)
- Palm Prints (1994, non-fiction)
- Ricochet Baby (1996)
- The House Within (1997, short story collection)
- The Best of Fiona Kidman's Short Stories (1998, short story collection)
- A Needle in the Heart (2002, short story collection)
- Songs from the Violet Café (2003)
- The Captive Wife (2005)
- At the End of Darwin Road (2008, memoirs)
- Beside the Dark Pool (2009, memoirs)
- The Trouble with Fire (2011, short story collection)
- The Infinite Air (2013)
- Preservation (2013, short story collection)
- All Day at the Movies (2016)
- This Mortal Boy (2018)
- All the Way to Summer (2020, short story collection)

=== Poetry collections ===
- Honey & Bitters (1975)
- On the Tightrope (1977)
- Going to the Chathams (1985)
- Wakeful Nights (1993)
- Where the Left Hand Rests (2010)
- This Change in the Light (2016)

=== Edited works ===
- New Zealand Love Stories: An Oxford Anthology (1998)
- The Best New Zealand Fiction:1 (2004)
- The Best New Zealand Fiction:2 (2005)
- The Best New Zealand Fiction:3 (2006)
