= John Stein (whaler) =

Australian mariner and navigator (1811-1841)

Captain John Stein, (c.1811 - 1841), was a Dublin born early navigator and whaler based in Hobart and Sydney. At the age of 22, he circumnavigated the globe in the Emma Kemp, and also set out on an expedition to Antarctica. In 1834 he suffered a mutiny, and was then accused of assisting the escape of a convict from Tasmania. Stein died after a typhoon wrecked his whaling ship Mary near Woodlark Island in 1841.

== Biography ==
=== Early career ===
He may have been the John Steen who left Hobart as a crewman on the Adrian (Captain Brown) on 5 October 1826 bound for Sydney.

By 1830, John Stein was the 1st mate of the 134 ton brig Dragon, leaving Hobart for Sydney on 26 June 1830. The Dragon, under Captain Taylor, had just arrived on the 21st from Isle of France which she left on 30 April. Before this, the Dragon had been one of the first ships to have brought supplies to the fledgling settlement at Swan River.

=== Exploration of New Zealand ===
After Taylor left the Dragon at Sydney, Stein was made the captain of the Dragon for her voyage from Sydney to New Zealand on 4 August 1830, bringing a cargo of muskets and tobacco, presumably for trade with the Maori. After her return in December 1830, the Dragon's second voyage to New Zealand under Stein left Hobart in February 1831 and returned in September, this time on a whaling expedition. Stein then became the captain of the new 199 ton barque "William the Fourth," which made two expeditions from Hobart to New Zealand and back, 5 October 1831 - 23 January 1832 and 5 June 1832 - 1 September 1832. On this second voyage, he discovered a river in New Zealand which he named William the Fourth's river, identified by Robert McNabb as the Tory Channel or the Pelorus River. While there, Stein also named Horne's bay (now called Waitohi bay), after the ship's owner, Thomas Horne. He arrived back in Hobart 1 September 1832, bearing three Māori – Ahuda, Chewack, and their chief, Tamoc – from the town of Wickett, near Picton, as well as timber and flax.

=== Circumnavigation and Antarctic voyage ===
Stein's next voyage was embarked on the 37 ton sloop Emma Kemp, setting out for New Zealand in December 1832, but continuing on to Rio de Janeiro and thence to Hobart, returning on 12 August 1833. By reaching Hobart, Stein had completed a circumnavigation of the globe, at the age of 22, and that with only five others on board, none of whom could read, and without any medicine on board.

Following this, the Sydney Monitor reported his plan to sail to the south pole, entitling him "the Tasmanian Captain Cook," referring to his circumnavigation of the globe. It claimed that the expedition was likely to reach the continent in a week or ten days. His vessel at the time was the 86 ton schooner Adelaide, which had already had experience in the Antarctic latitudes in her prior voyages. The expedition returned to Hobart on the 28th of March, 1834, as reported in the Colonist and Van Diemen's Land Commercial and Agricultural Advertiser:

28 March – Arrived the schooner Adelaide, 86 tons, Captain Stein, from the South Seas, which she left 21 November, with a cargo of 32 tons sperm oil.

No further mention of the Antarctic intentions of the voyage were made, implying perhaps that no new lands were discovered.

=== The Mutiny on the Adelaide ===
After a fortnight in Hobart, Stein readied the Adelaide for departure on the new wharf, leaving on the 15th of April 1834. Unbeknownst to him, a convict named William Powers had made his way onto the ship, whose presence Stein noticed only after two days at sea. He had met James Cootes, a seaman of the Adelaide, at the William the Fourth public house, and was brought on board secretly. Instead of returning in to port, Stein, along with the first mate, named Charles Aldridge, had resolved to leave Powers on Lord Howe Island, after a stop at Port Macquarie, with the carpenter, John Evans, where a government boat was later sent to collect him. With this going on, however, the crew, some of whom knew Powers, became increasingly mutinous, to the extent that, on the 18th of October, when Captain John Lewis of the whaling barque Wolf requested to board the Adelaide off the coast of Malanta, he found the crew in a state of mutiny, led by a man named Valentine.

The Adelaide eventually weighed anchor in Sydney, where Stein sought out his agent and future father in law, John Forster Church, to prosecute his crew for mutiny, but, along with Aldridge, was himself arrested and kept in gaol for aiding the absconding of Powers. The case went to the Supreme Court of New South Wales on the 13 May 1835, before chief justice Sir Francis Forbes and a civil jury, who acquitted Stein and Aldridge of the charge of aiding, Powers' escape, their defence lawyer Mr Sydney Stephen arguing that the New South Welsh supreme court had no jurisdiction in matters concerning convicts of Van Diemen's Land. Possibly due to this fact, Stein considered it unwise to return to Hobart, relocating his operations to Sydney.

=== Sydney whaling ===
Stein's career soon returned to normal in Sydney, where he was commissioned as captain of the Lunar, as reported in the Sydney Monitor, 11 July 1835, and departing on the 29th of July. Stein was at sea for more than a year, arriving back in Port Jackson on 30 November 1836. He then found work as captain of the 250 ton barque Mary, owned by Hughes and Hoskings, on another long whaling voyage, 14 April 1837 to 19 July 1838. After Mary was recoppered, her second voyage under Stein took almost as long, departing on the 19th of September 1838 and returning on the 30th of the same month the following year. Back in Sydney, Stein connected with John Forster Church, and on 14 November 1839, Stein married his daughter, Sarah Emma Church, at St Philip's Church, Sydney. He took her along for his next whaling voyage, 21 December 1839 to 20 July 1840, and they had one daughter.

=== Wreck of the Mary ===
Stein's final voyage left on the 20th of September, 1840, and the first report of the incident came on 25 March 1843, in the Sydney Morning Herald. Captain McCarrol, of the barque Jane, first discovered the wreck of the Mary on 22 November 1842. He had landed on the north-west part of Lachlan's islands, when he found strewn around the island casks and various articles belonging to the wreck, and he found some belongings of John Stein, including the ship's clearance. He said that the natives pointed to John Stein's grave in particular, saying "he vomited a good deal a short time previous to his death."

A later report provided more detail. There had been a great Typhoon in December 1840, while they were on the North side of Woodlark Island. On the 1st, at 9 pm, they were at the mercy of the hurricane, and by the fourth hour of the 2nd, they had struck the reef on the south east point of Lachlan's islands. Four crew were tossed overboard, and one was crushed by the moving of the casks. After the winds had died down, they constructed a raft, and in a short time they had constructed huts on the island with the help of the natives. Seven more hands died naturally, over a period of nine months. After this time, they were made ready for a journey to some part of New Holland, though Captain Stein, the doctor, the carpenter, and two others, had become ill. As they left, the people of the island attacked them and killed all the sick, including John Stein, but not the carpenter. The two boats, carrying fifteen survivors, and carrying three native women likely the subject of the dispute, landed on Woodlark island, and found a settlement. One of the crew, William Valentine, separated himself from the group to spend the night with a native tribe, but when he returned, he was told by a native women that the others had been killed by natives of the other island, as they had shot one. After jumping from tribe to tribe, he eventually escaped on a stolen canoe, to the ship named the Woodlark, of Captain Smith. Captain Eury, of the Tigress, met this ship, and questioned Valentine, who relayed the story to him, and then Eury to the paper. William Valentine later returned to Britain, after being declared unfit for serving as a sailor ever again because of his illness sustained while on the island.

=== Legacy ===
Stein's only daughter, Eliza George Stein, married Osman Edward Middleton. He was the third son of Rev. George Augustus Middleton, the early colonial chaplain of Morpeth and Maitland. In 1845, Stein's wife married again, to R K Broughton, in Tumut.
