= Flora Park Cave Spurdle =

New Zealand journalist and local historian

Flora Park Cave Spurdle (1883–1973) was a notable New Zealand journalist, museum worker and local historian. She was born in Whanganui, New Zealand on 3 March 1883. She died there on 7 October 1973.
