= Cloudy Bay =

Bay in Marlborough District, New Zealand

Te Koko-o-Kupe / Cloudy Bay
- Te Koko-o-Kupe (Māori)
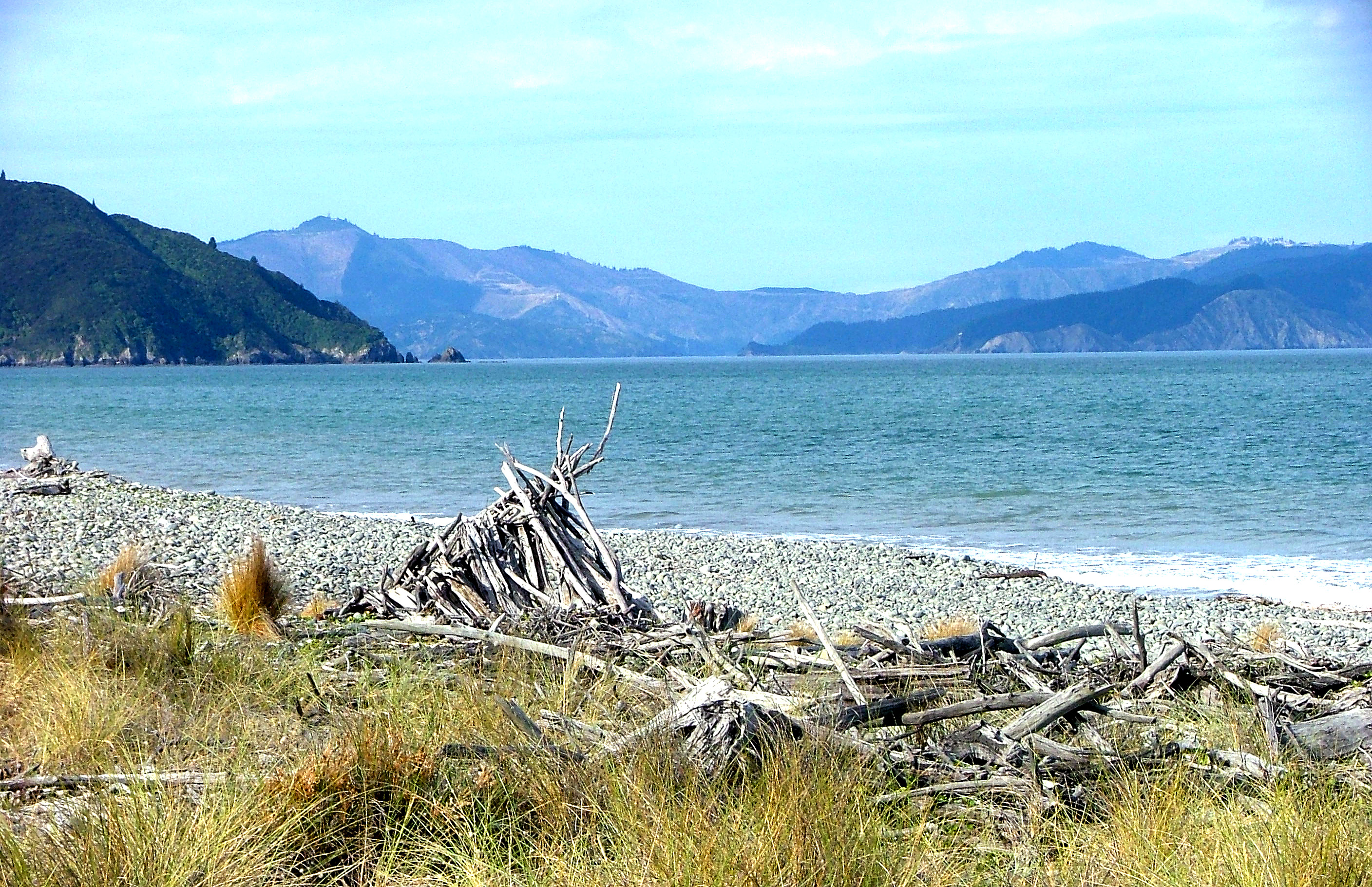
- Te Koko-o-Kupe / Cloudy Bay, looking towards Te Whanganui / Port Underwood

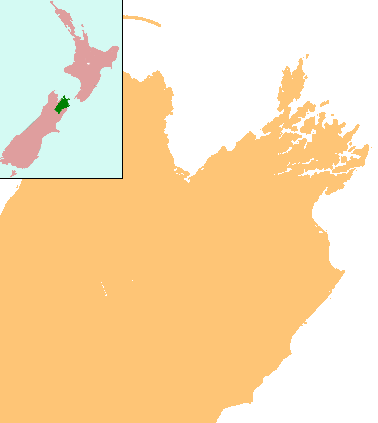
- Location of Te Koko-o-Kupe / Cloudy Bay
- Location: Marlborough District
- Coordinates: 41°25′S 174°04′E
- Type: Bay
- Etymology: The scoop of Kupe (from Māori)
- Part of: Cook Strait
- Primary inflows: Wairau River, Ōpaoa River
- Ocean/sea sources: Pacific Ocean
- Basin countries: New Zealand
- Max. width: 20 kilometres (12 mi)
- Benches: Wairau Bar

Te Koko-o-Kupe / Cloudy Bay is located at the northeast of New Zealand's South Island, to the south of the Marlborough Sounds and north of Clifford Bay. In August 2014, the name Cloudy Bay, given by Captain Cook in 1770, was officially altered to Te Koko-o-Kupe / Cloudy Bay, with the Māori name recalling the early explorer Kupe scooping up oysters from the bay. The area lends its name to one of the best known New World white wines (Cloudy Bay Vineyards Sauvignon Blanc) although the grapes used in production of that wine are grown in the Marlborough wine region further inland.

== Features ==
The bay faces Cook Strait, stretching north–south over a distance of 30 kilometres (19 mi) from the southern extremity of the Marlborough Sounds (Port Underwood) to White Bluffs. Along its length is the delta of the Wairau River, which reaches the sea at two points. The southern of these forms an entrance to the Big Lagoon, just to the north of White Bluffs. The central point is known as the Wairau Diversion. There is also a swimming beach to the north known as Whites Bay.

Fifteen minutes drive from central Blenheim is the coastal community of Rārangi which consists of an original beachfront settlement in the northern end of Cloudy Bay which ranges from the typical New Zealand bach or crib along with some high quality homes. It also has a newer large subdivision within the central part of Cloudy Bay nearer to the coastal man-made river which is known as the Wairau Diversion.

== History ==
Archaeological excavations at Wairau Bar indicate that Māori were living there in the 'moa-hunter' period about 1288 to 1300 for a period of about 20 years. This is the oldest and best researched site of early Polynesian settlement in New Zealand. Cloudy Bay was named by Captain James Cook on 7 February 1770. Sealers first visited about 1826 and set up stations at Port Underwood, the deep inlet at the north of the bay. They were followed by whalers with John Guard setting up a whaling station at Port Underwood in 1828 with his ship Waterloo. By 1840 there were approximately 150 Europeans in the area, probably the largest concentration in the South Island at that time. Between 1829 and 1832, Waterloo made three return trips to Sydney per year selling seal skins, flax and whale oil and returning with supplies and trade goods. In 1832 Guard installed Capt Hall as a new master in the Waterloo. On 17 June 1840 the Treaty of Waitangi was signed by South Island chiefs at Horahora-Kakahu Island, just off-shore from Port Underwood. It was being transported around the New Zealand coast on HMS Herald.

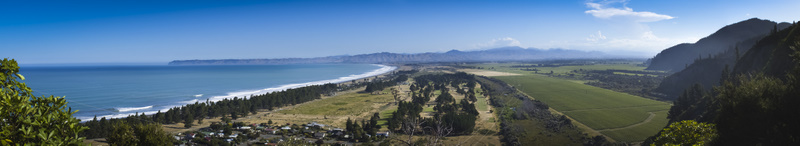
Looking from Whites Bay Hill

== See also ==
- New Zealand wine
