= Tory Channel =

Channel in New Zealand

Tory Channel / Kura Te Au
- William the Fourth River
- Kura Te Au (Māori)
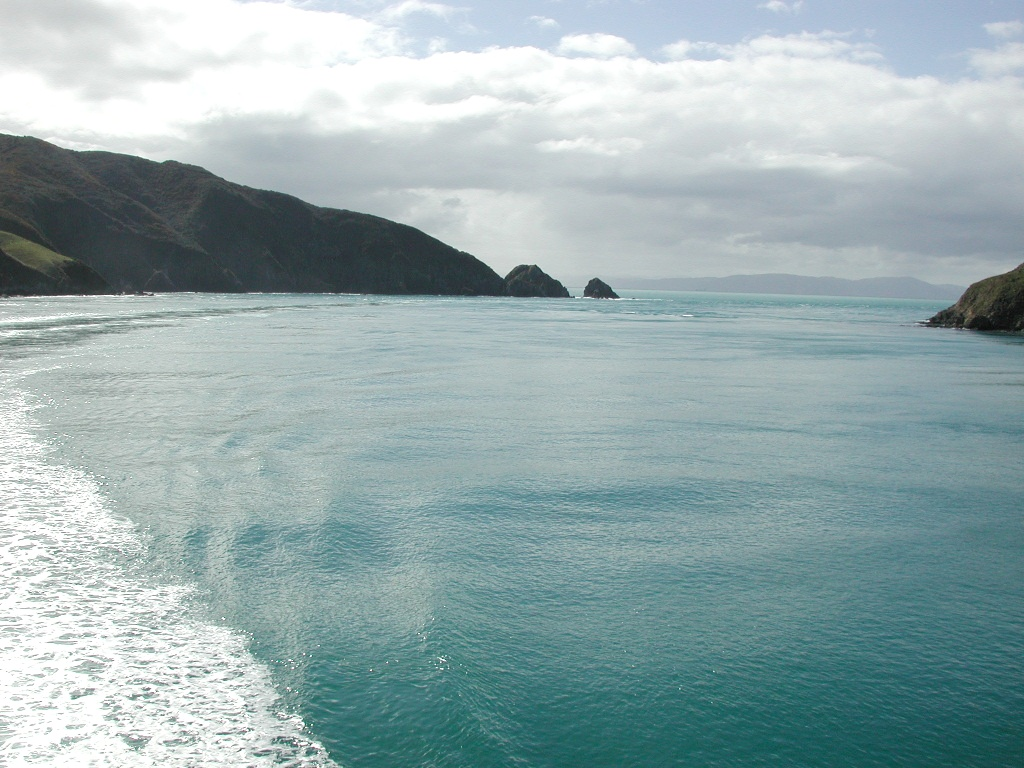
- Entrance of Tory Channel / Kura Te Au

- Tory Channel / Kura Te Au Tory Channel / Kura Te Au (New Zealand)
- Location: Marlborough Region, New Zealand
- Coordinates: 41°14′24″S 174°14′00″E
- Type: Ria
- Part of: Marlborough Sounds
- Max. length: 16.8 kilometres (10.4 mi)
- Max. width: 1.1 kilometres (0.68 mi)
- Average depth: 39.2 metres (129 ft)
- Max. depth: 65 metres (213 ft)
- Islands: Moioio Island

Tory Channel (officially Tory Channel / Kura Te Au) is one of the drowned valleys that form the Marlborough Sounds in New Zealand. Inter-island ferries normally use it as the principal channel between Cook Strait and the Marlborough Sounds.

Tory Channel lies to the south of Arapaoa Island, separating it from the mainland. At its western end it joins the larger Queen Charlotte Sound, which it meets halfway along the latter's length. Its eastern end meets Cook Strait close to the strait's narrowest point. The Channel is 16.8 km (10.4 mi) long, averages 1.1 km (0.68 mi) in width, and is up to 65 m (213 ft) deep, with an average channel depth of 39.2 m (129 ft).

Tory Channel forms a substantial part of the ferry route between Wellington and Picton. Erosion attributed to the wake from the ferries, particularly the new faster ones (discontinued in 2005), has resulted in speed restrictions.

One of the two candidates for the easternmost point in the South Island (along with Cape Campbell) lies at the entrance of Tory Channel. It is called West Head.

== History ==
Te Āti Awa and Ngāti Tama recognize the channel Kura Te Au as an important historic mahinga kai (food source), and settlement for Te Āti Awa. The channel was used as a primary highway by Te Āti Awa, and is still monitored and defended by the iwi in the environmental courts.

The name Kura Te Au originates from the red colour of the sea caused by a variety of plankton and the high populations of crustacean krill. According to legend, Kura Te Au is where Kupe killed the giant, mythical octopus, Te Wheke-a-Muturangi, causing its blood to run through the channel, turning the water red. Kurahaupō and Rangitāne give the meaning "the red current" for Kura Te Au.

James Cook anchored several times in the nearby bay he named Ship Cove. He sighted the Tory Channel in an excursion on the pinnace from his ship HMS Resolution on 5 November 1774. John Guard established the first permanent whaling station on Arapaoa Island in 1827, targeting whales in the Tory Channel for their baleen and whale oil. Another whaler, John Stein, navigated the areas between Queen Charlotte Sound and Cloudy Bay in his whaling barque William the Fourth, and found "a very large navigable river ... which he named William the Fourth River." According to Robert McNab's 1913 book 'The Old Whaling Days', which drew upon the knowledge of John Duncan, a resident of the Sound, to identify the locations visited by Stein in his 1832 voyage, this 'river' is now known as the Tory Channel. Tory Channel was accurately surveyed in 1840 and named after the New Zealand Company ship Tory, a pioneer ship that brought British colonists to Wellington. Around this time, whaling stations were already operating in Te Awaiti Bay. Between 1911 and 1964, the Perano family hunted whales from Whekenui Bay. Humpback whales were spotted from the hills at the Tory Channel entrance during their migration through Cook Strait. The Perano Whaling Station was the last whaling operation in New Zealand and closed in 1964.

The name of the channel was officially altered to Tory Channel / Kura Te Au in August 2014.

== Tidal power ==
Energy Pacifica planned to install up to ten underwater tidal stream turbines, each able to produce up to 1.2 MW, near the Cook Strait entrance to Tory Channel. They claimed Tory Channel had tidal flows of 3.6 metres per second (12 ft/s) with good bathymetry and access to the electricity network. Other designs envisaged up to 50 turbines, but there are uncertainties about flow rates, the area is about 15 km (9.3 mi) from the HVDC Inter-Island transmission station at Ōraumoa / Fighting Bay and a calculation in 2013 suggested that an economic return was unlikely.
