= Arapaoa Island =

Island in Marlborough Sounds, New Zealand

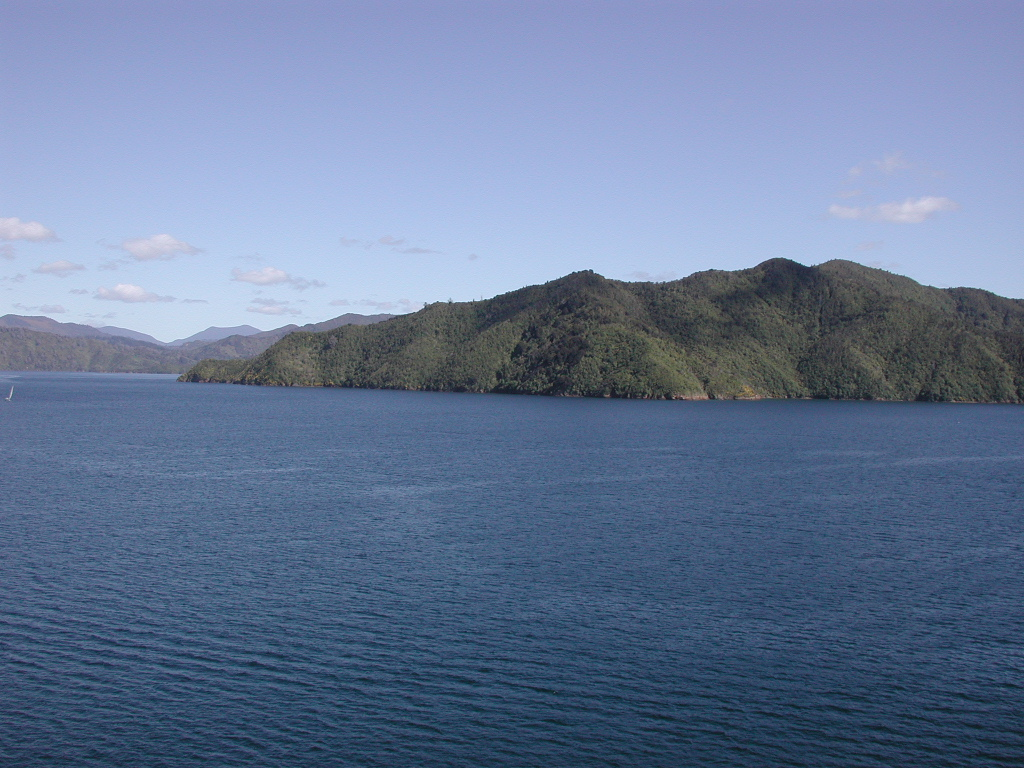
- Southern end of Arapaoa Island

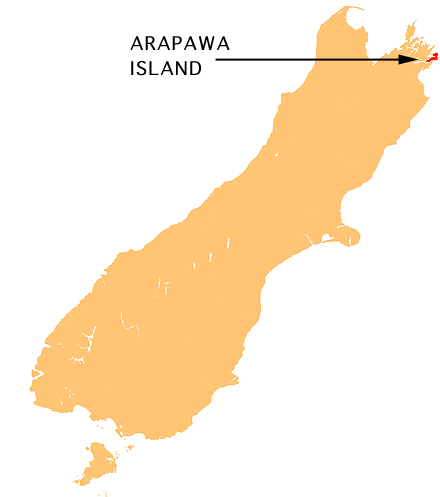
- Arapaoa Island relative to the South Island

Geography
- Location: Marlborough Sounds
- Coordinates: 41.18951°S 174.30290°E
- Area: 75 km^{2} (29 sq mi)
- Length: 28 km (17.4 mi)
- Width: 4 km (2.5 mi)
- Highest elevation: 559.4 m (1835.3 ft)
- Highest point: Narawhia

Administration
- New Zealand
- Region: Marlborough District

Demographics
- Population: 50

Arapaoa Island (formerly spelled Arapawa Island) is the second-largest island in the Marlborough Sounds, at the north-east tip of the South Island of New Zealand. The island has a land area of 75 km^{2} (29 square miles). Queen Charlotte Sound defines its western side, while to the south lies Tory Channel, which is on the sea route between Wellington in the North Island to Picton. Cook Strait's narrowest point is between Arapaoa Island's Perano Head and Cape Terawhiti in the North Island.

== History ==
According to Māori oral tradition, the island was where the great navigator Kupe killed the octopus Te Wheke-a-Muturangi.

It was from a hill on Arapaoa Island in 1770 that Captain James Cook first saw the sea passage from the Pacific Ocean to the Tasman Sea, and confirmed that what the indigenous people had told him was correct – Aotearoa is composed of two main islands. Cook is not known for naming places after himself, and it is speculated that Joseph Banks bestowed the name Cook Strait. This discovery banished the fond notion of geographers that there existed a great southern continent, Terra Australis. A monument at Cook's Lookout was erected in 1970.

From the late 1820s until the mid-1960s, Arapaoa Island was a base for whaling in the Sounds. John Guard established a shore station at Te Awaiti in 1827, however initially could only salvage baleen until the station was equipped to process whale oil from 1830 onwards, targeting right whales. Later, the station at Perano Head on the east coast of the island was used to hunt humpback whales from 1911 to 1964 (see Whaling in New Zealand). The houses built by the Perano family are now operated as tourist accommodation. In the 2000s the former whalers from the Perano and Heberley families, who live on Arapawa, joined a Department of Conservation whale spotting programme to assess how the humpback whale population has recovered since the end of whaling.

An Air Albatross Cessna 402 commuter aircraft struck the 11,000-volt power lines linking the island and the mainland over Tory Channel in 1985. Eight people died in the crash, including the pilot. The sole survivor 11-year-old Cindy Mosey lost both her parents and two sisters in the crash. In 2001 the high-tension wires above Tory channel were labelled among the "20 worst spans" posing hazard to aircraft by the CAA. This and other high-tension wire spans in the Marlborough Sounds still remain a point of contention having caused multiple deadly wire strikes.

In August 2014, the spelling of the island's name was officially changed from Arapawa to Arapaoa.

== Conservation ==
Parts of the island have been heavily cleared of native vegetation in the past through burning and logging, A number of pine forests were planted on the island. Wilding pines, an invasive species in some parts of New Zealand, are being poisoned on the island to allow the regenerating native vegetation to grow. About 200 hectares (490 acres) at Ruaomoko Point on the south-eastern portion of the island will be killed by drilling holes into the trees and injecting poison.

Arapaoa Island is known for the breeds of domestic animals found only on the island – the Arapawa pig, Arapawa sheep and Arapawa goat. They became established in the 19th century, but the origin of the breeds is uncertain, and a matter of some speculation. Common suggestions are that they are old English breeds introduced by the early whalers, or by Captain Cook or other early explorers. These breeds are now extinct in England, and the goats surviving in a sanctuary on the island are now also bred in other parts of New Zealand and in the northern hemisphere.

Introduced predators on the island include stoats, feral cats, rats and mice. Stoats are being trapped with the aim of eradicating them. Trail cameras for monitoring stoats revealed that feral cats were also a major problem on the island, and they are now being targeted too.

The small Brothers Islands, which lie off the northeast coast of Arapaoa Island, are a sanctuary for the rare Brothers Island tuatara.

== See also ==
- List of islands of New Zealand
