= Wairau River =

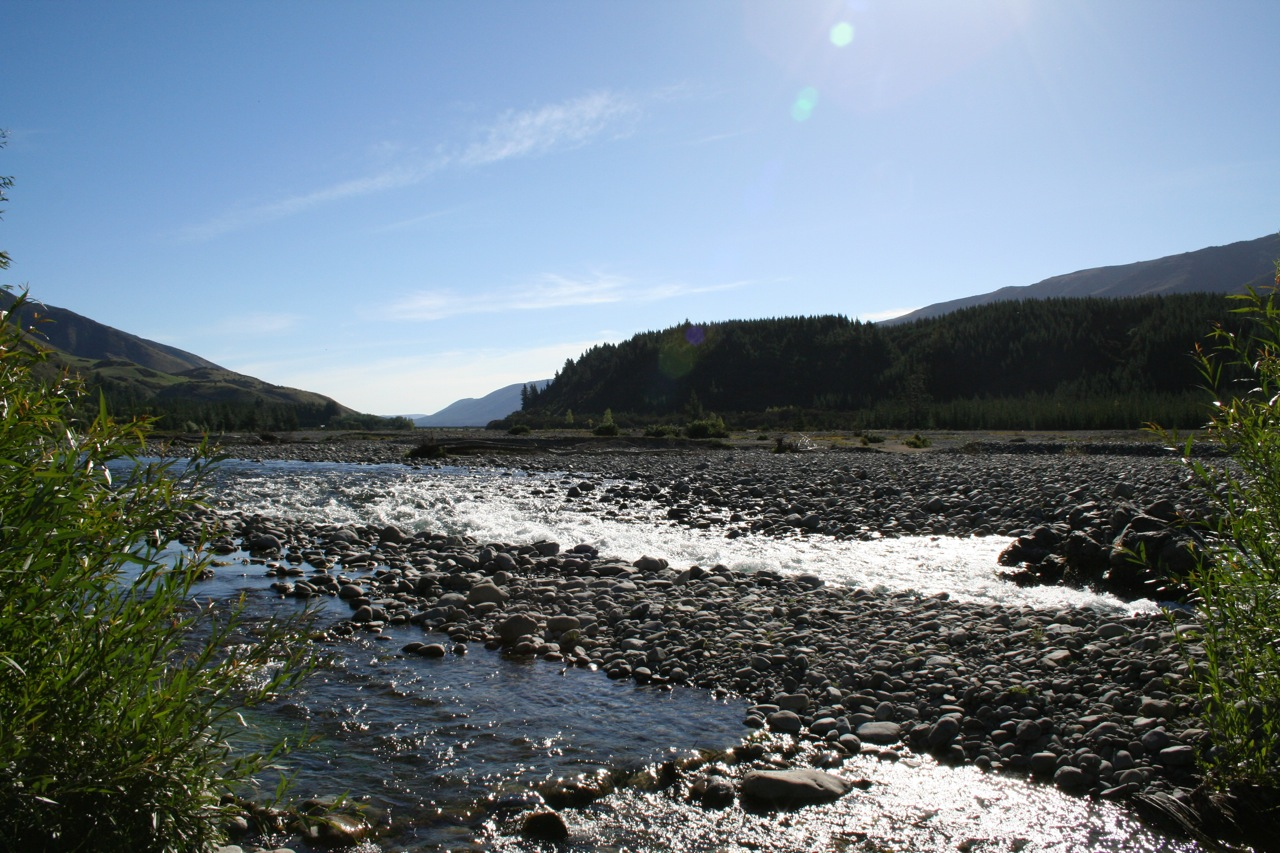
- Kowhai Point in the Wairau Valley
- Interactive map of Wairau River
- Native name: Wairau (Māori)

Location
- Country: New Zealand
- Region: Marlborough

Physical characteristics
- Source
  - location: Spenser Mountains
- Mouth
  - location: Te Koko-o-Kupe / Cloudy Bay
  - coordinates: 41°34′S 173°31′E
- Length: 170 kilometres (110 mi)

The Wairau River is one of the longest rivers in New Zealand's South Island. It flows for 170 kilometres (110 mi) from the Spenser Mountains (a northern range of the Southern Alps), firstly in a northwards direction and then northeast down a long, straight valley in inland Marlborough.

The river's lower reaches and surrounding fertile plain provide the basis for the Marlborough wine region. The river has its outflow into Cook Strait at Cloudy Bay, just north of Blenheim in the island's northeast. The Wairau River meets the sea at the Wairau Bar, an important archaeological site.

In pre-European and early colonial New Zealand, one of the South Island's largest Māori settlements was close to the mouth of the Wairau. The Wairau Valley was the scene of the 1843 Wairau Affray, the first violent clash between Māori residents and English settlers over land in New Zealand and the only one to take place in the South Island.

== Hydroelectricity ==
Two hydroelectric power stations operate on tributaries of the river.

The Wairau Hydro Scheme proposed by TrustPower would operate on a 48-kilometre (30 mi) long canal. Up to 60 percent of the flow of the river would be diverted into the canal. A resource consent has been granted for the scheme but opponents appealed to the Environment Court. Consents for the scheme lapsed in 2021.
