= Friends (ship) =

History
- Name: Friends

General characteristics
- Tons burthen: 339 ton
- Propulsion: Sail

Friends was a 339-ton merchant ship and convict ship that transported convicts to Australia. She plied the Caribbean trade routes.

Under the command of James Ralph, Friends left England on 21 January 1811 with 100 female convicts. She sailed via Rio de Janeiro and arrived at Port Jackson on 10 October. Friends left Port Jackson on 2 December bound for England.
