= Marlborough Sounds =

Flooded valleys in New Zealand

Coordinates: 41°08′30″S 174°05′22″E

Topographic map of the Marlborough Sounds

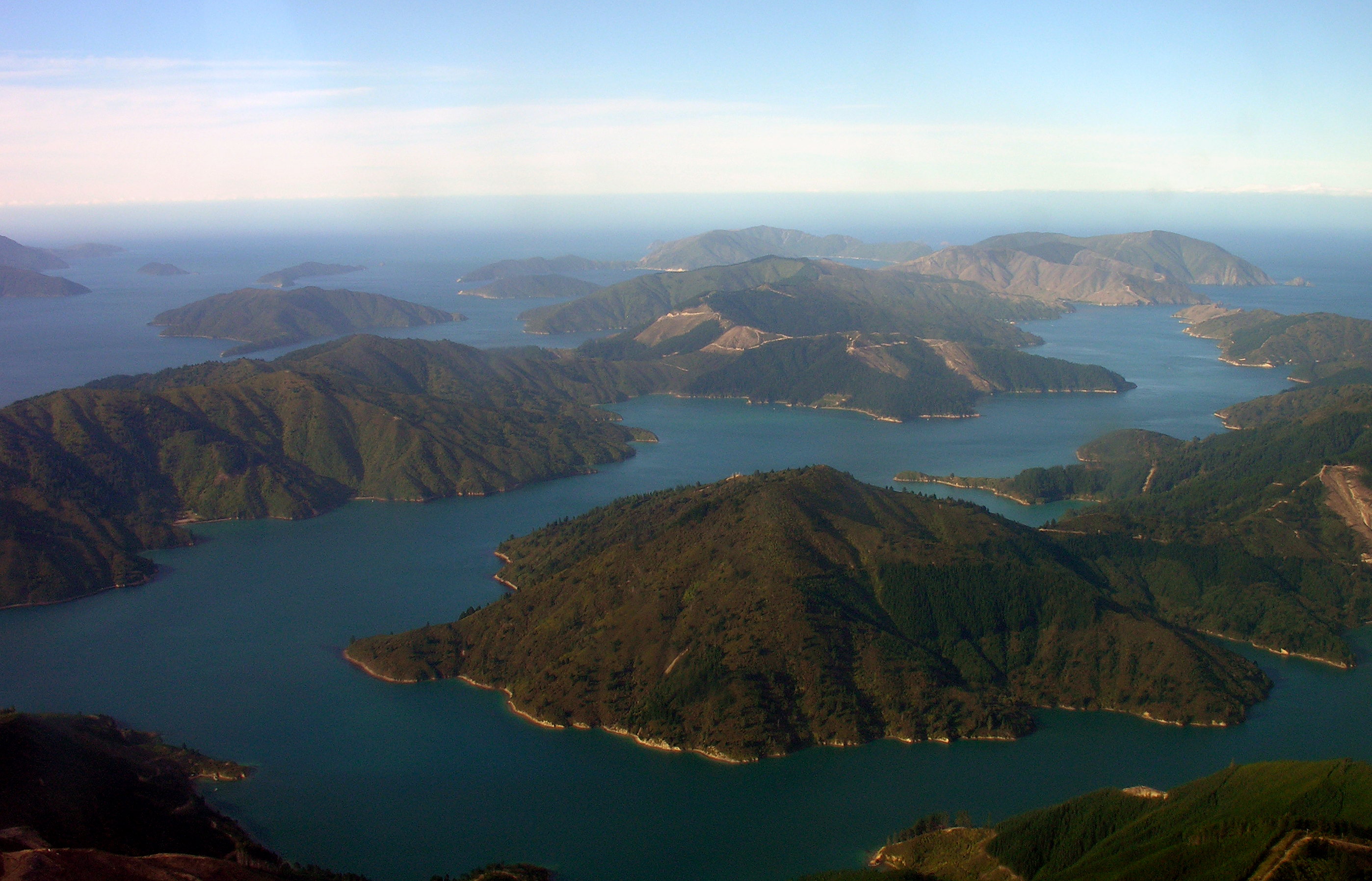
Tory Channel, a major arm of Queen Charlotte Sound.

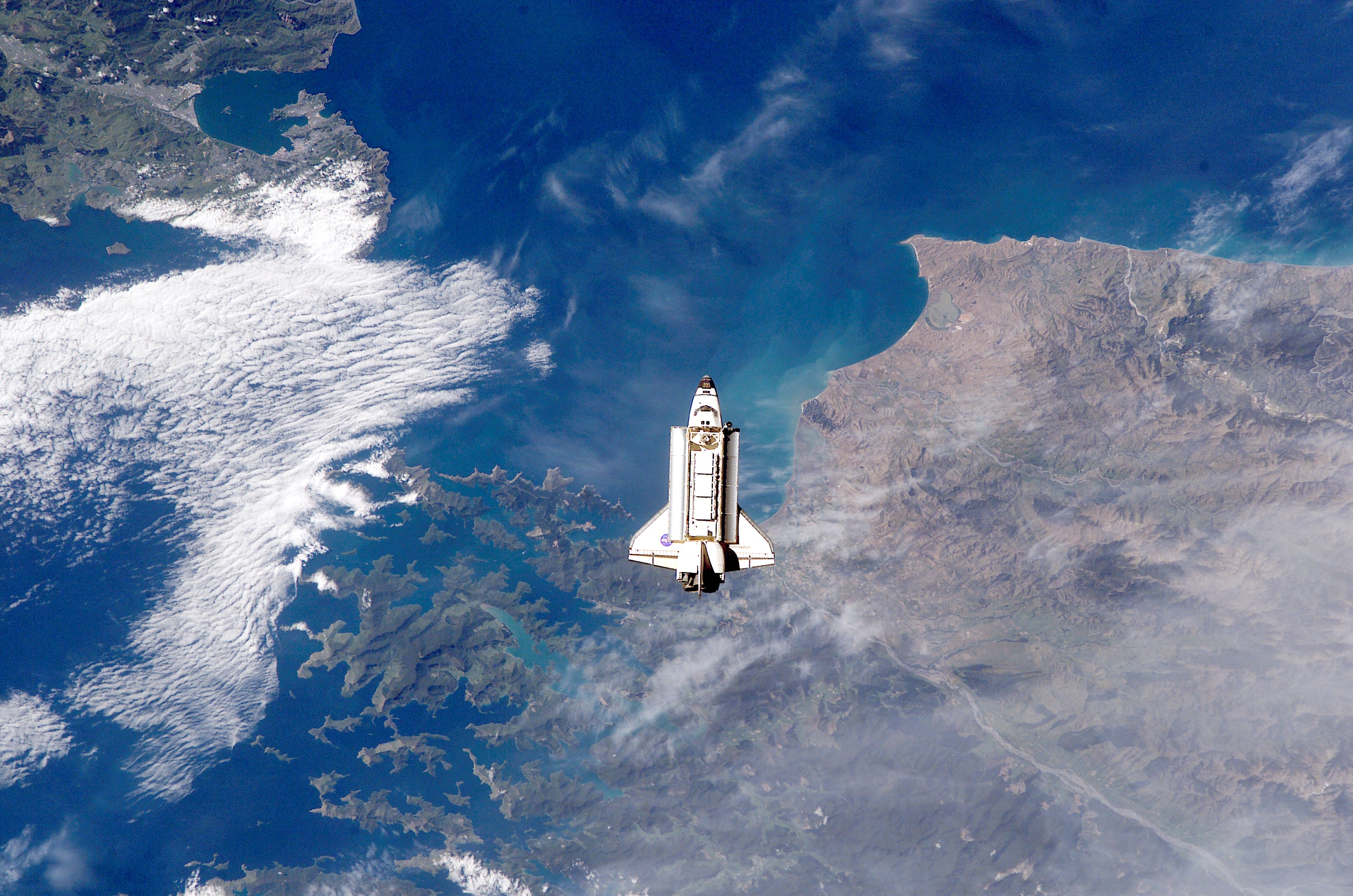
The Sounds visible to the left of the Space Shuttle, image taken from the International Space Station

The Marlborough Sounds (te reo Māori: Te Tauihu-o-te-Waka) are an extensive network of sea-drowned valleys at the northern end of the South Island of New Zealand. The Marlborough Sounds were created by a combination of land subsidence and rising sea levels. According to Māori mythology, the sounds are the prows of the many sunken waka of Aoraki.

== Overview ==
Covering some 4,000 km^{2} (1,500 sq mi) of sounds, islands, and peninsulas, the Marlborough Sounds lie at the South Island's north-easternmost point, between Tasman Bay in the west and Cloudy Bay in the south-east. The almost fractal coastline has 1/10 of the length of New Zealand's coasts.

The steep, wooded hills and small quiet bays of the sounds are sparsely populated, as access is difficult. Many of the small settlements and isolated houses are only accessible by boat. The main large port is Picton on the mainland, at the head of Queen Charlotte Sound. It is at the northern terminus of the South Island's main railway and state highway networks. The main small-boat port, Waikawa, is one of New Zealand's largest and provides a base for leisure sailors and vacationers.

The main sounds, other than Queen Charlotte Sound, are Pelorus Sound / Te Hoiere and Kenepuru Sound. Havelock is a small port town at the head of Pelorus Sound / Te Hoiere. Tory Channel is a major arm of Queen Charlotte Sound, and between them, the Channel and the Sound isolate the hills of Arapaoa Island from the mainland. Other major islands in the sounds include D'Urville Island.

The Sounds are home to the entire breeding population of the rare and vulnerable rough-faced shag (also known as the New Zealand king cormorant) which nests on a small number of rocky islets there. The Department of Conservation manages a total of over 50 reserves in the area.

== History ==
=== Pre-modern era ===
The sounds were extensively travelled and partly inhabited by Māori groups before the coming of the Europeans, using the sounds as shelter from bad weather and partaking of the rich food sources. Māori were also known to carry their canoes over some stretches of land on portage paths. However, as in most areas of the South Island, populations were smaller than in the North Island.

European history of the area is considered to start with Captain Cook's visit to the sounds in the 1770s, discovering a plant (Cook's scurvy grass) high in vitamin C which helped to cure scurvy amongst his crew. On Motuara Island, Cook also proclaimed British sovereignty over the South Island. Some parts of the sounds also later developed a significant whaling history, and much of the sounds was (thinly) settled by European farmers in the late 19th and early 20th century.

=== Ferries and marine farms ===
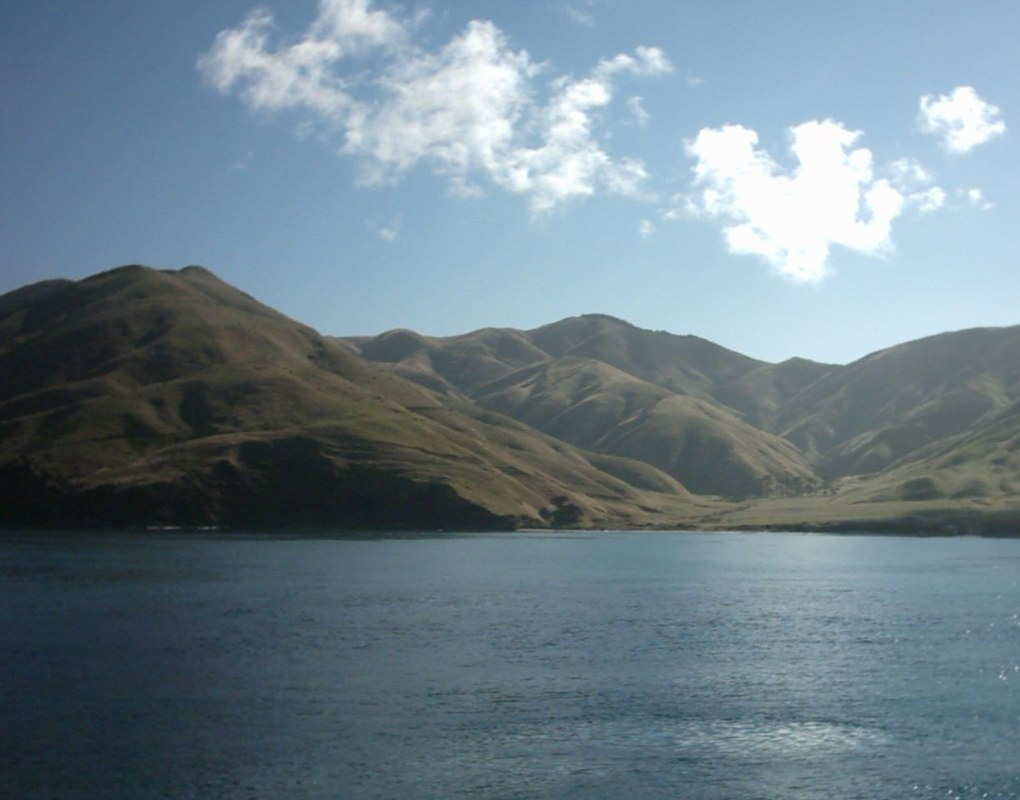
The Marlborough Sounds as seen from the Wellington-Picton ferry.

The Marlborough Sounds are connected to Cook Strait at the north-east extreme. At this point, the North Island is at its closest to the South Island, and the inter-island road, rail, and passenger ferry service between Picton and Wellington travels through the sounds.

Marine farming, especially of salmon and mussels, is increasingly common, having started in the 1960s. However, the wakes caused by fast catamaran vehicular ferry services to the North Island have allegedly damaged farms and destroyed crab grounds. They were also blamed for stripping the local beaches bare of sand, and damaging landings and other facilities built close to the water's edge. This resulted in a dispute heard in the New Zealand Environment Court in the early 1990s, brought forward by the 'Guardians of the Sounds' group. The court, however, not only refused to restrict the fast ferries but also awarded NZ$300,000 in court costs against the citizen group which had brought the case. This was seen as a strong blow against civic action, and a curtailing of the powers of the Resource Management Act.

However, as damage increasingly became visible, and protests continued, the fast ferries (which only operated for the summer season) were eventually restricted to a lower speed of 18 knots in the sounds (officially for safety reasons), reducing their time advantage over the conventional ferries. They have since been discontinued.

In July/August 2007, the 'Guardians of the Sounds' environmentalist group planned a 100-ship flotilla protest against scallop dredging in the sounds, which they consider damages the ecosystem of the sounds similar to bottom trawling in the open sea. The protest was intended to call attention to what they allege is the Ministry of Fisheries ignoring the detrimental effect of the practice. Commercial scallops harvesting companies have warned that protests could endanger lives if the protesters engaged in dangerous manoeuvres, while the Ministry of Fisheries has also noted that only 6% of the sounds are set aside for the dredging, though this had been much more extensive in the past.

== Dangerous waters ==
The main channels of the Marlborough Sounds have calm water and are popular for sailing. Cook Strait, however, is infamous for its strong currents and rough waters, especially when the wind is from the south or north. Because of this, some of the narrow channels closer to the Strait are dangerous to navigate. Notable amongst these is French Pass at the southern end of D'Urville Island, which has several vortices.

The most notable shipwreck in the sounds is that of the Russian cruise liner MS Mikhail Lermontov, which sank in 1986 in Port Gore, close to the mouth of Queen Charlotte Sound, after colliding with rocks. One crew member was killed in the disaster. The ship herself is now a popular dive wreck.
