= John Guard =

Jacky Guard
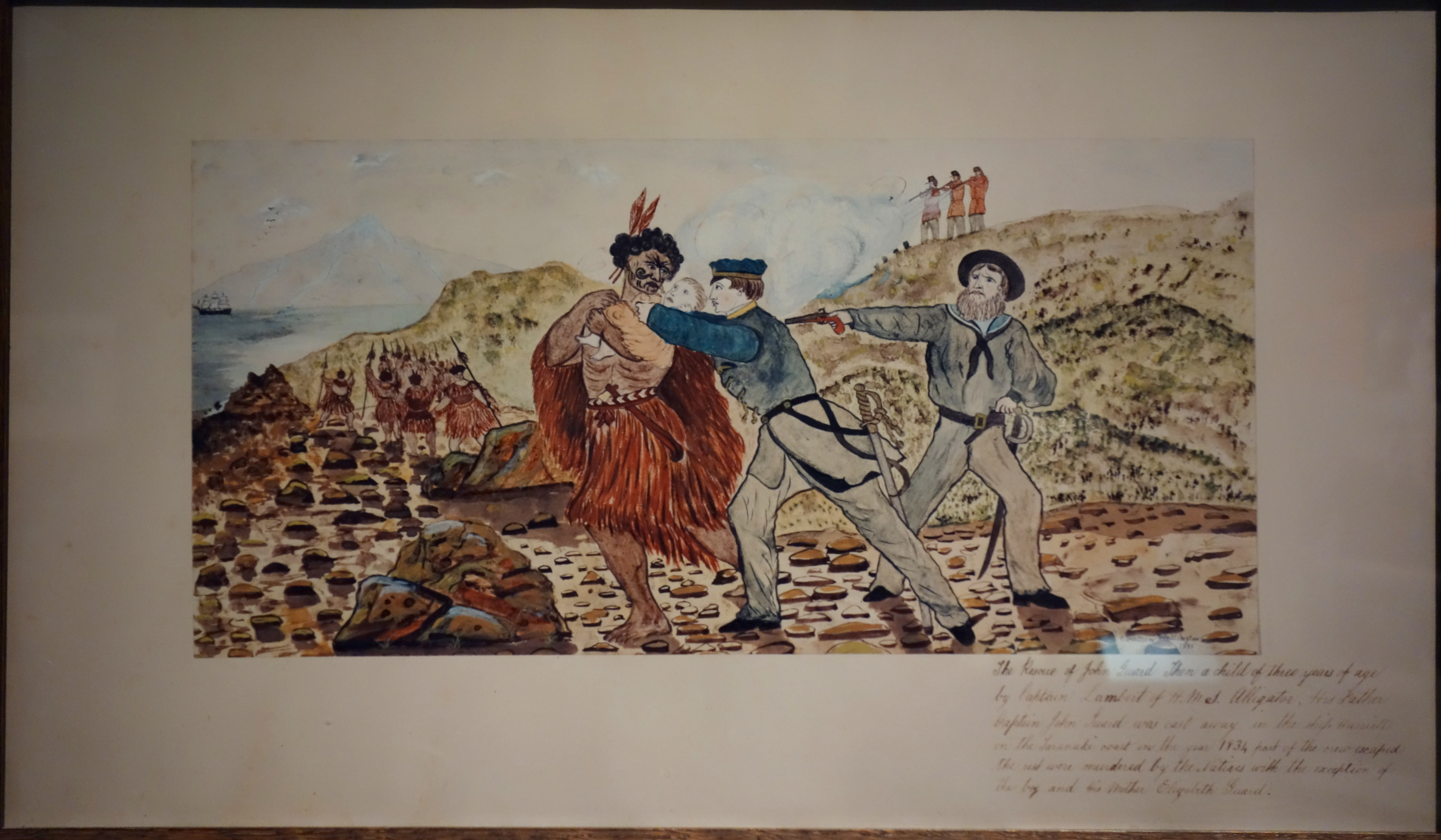
- The Rescue of John Guard, by C. Watson, Wellington, 1885
- Born: John Guard c. 1791/1792; London, England
- Died: 9 November 1857
- Burial place: Kakapo Bay, Port Underwood, New Zealand
- Other name: Jack or Jacky Guard
- Occupations: stonecutter, whaler, trader
- Spouse: Betty Parker (m. 1830)
- Children: 8

John Guard (c. 1791/92 – 1857) was an English convict sent to Australia who was one of the first European settlers in the South Island of New Zealand, working as a whaler and trader.

== Early life ==
Guard was born in London in 1791 or 1792. On 17 March 1813 at age 21, the stonecutter was convicted of stealing a quilt and sentenced to transportation and five years hard labour. At the end of his sentence, he worked as a sealer, and after five or six years had his own boat and crew. He also served on at least one Australian whaler in the 1820s.

== New Zealand ==
Guard can lay credit to a number of European firsts in New Zealand's South Island. His whaling station, established at Te Awaiti on the Arapaoa Island shore of Tory Channel in 1827, was the first permanent settlement in the South Island, previous whaling stations having been seasonal. Guard's wife Elizabeth or Betty (née Parker, 1814–1870) whom he married in Sydney in 1830, was the first European woman to settle in the South Island. Guard's son, John junior (born 1 October 1831) was the first European child born in the South Island and his daughter Louisa (born late 1833) the first female child.

A year after starting the Te Awaiti station, in 1828, he started a branch whaling station at Port Underwood using the ship Waterloo. He used the ship to transport flax, whale oil and seal skins to Sydney three times per year, returning with supplies and trade goods. Later he had to abandon the Te Awaiti station.

In 1834 he was wrecked off the Taranaki coast in the Harriet with his wife and family and crew. The survivors were attacked by two different groups of local Māori. The wreck was plundered and 14 crew killed and two eaten. Betty Guard was tomahawked in the head, only her comb saving her life. Mrs Guard and her daughter were taken by the chief but the two and a half-year-old boy was taken away from his mother and not seen for two months.

Sir Richard Bourke, the governor of New South Wales, dispatched HMS Alligator to Taranaki with a group of 60 British soldiers from the 50th Regiment of Foot onboard. They landed a small party on the coast and attempted negotiations with the Māori captors to recover the eight remaining crew (along with Guard's wife and two children, John and Louisa) but were chased away. The Alligator was then forced out to sea by bad weather.

Together with the merchant schooner Isabella, the warship eventually returned to the Taranaki coast and landed a detachment of sailors and marines. An arrangement was made to ransom the prisoners; the captain suspected the prisoners were being held at Te Namu Pa and landed a party there. They made contact with the Māori captors, and chief Oaoiti was bayoneted and taken back to the Alligator. His wounds were then treated by the surgeon. The next day large numbers of Māori gathered on the beach but negotiations stalled until Oaoiti was brought ashore. He made a speech to the Māori captors and immediately Mrs Guard and her baby daughter were taken to the Alligator by waka, but the boy was still held prisoner.

While negotiations continued for his release, a shot from the pa was fired towards the Alligator, narrowly missing a sailor. The captain of the Alligator then ordered a bombardment of the pa that lasted three hours, during which the Māori hostage takers raised and then lowered a white flag several times. Near the end of the bombardment, a Māori man held up the captive boy to indicate he had not been killed. The Alligator's surgeon landed with hundred men. The boy was handed over, and the infuriated crew of the Harriet opened fire on the Māori gathered on the beach. The Māori fled and the pa was burnt down.

Fighting continued for several days as rough seas delayed the re-embarkation of the troops. The surgeon was horrified at the troop's action. The rescue expedition sent by Governor Bourke from Sydney was subsequently criticised by a House of Commons report in 1835. Bourke used the kidnappings, murders and cannibalism to argue for a naval warship to be permanently stationed in New Zealand.

Guard settled permanently at Port Underwood in 1836, and was still whaling off the Kaikōura coast in the 1840s. About this time onshore whaling ceased to be economically viable in New Zealand. His later life is unknown, but he probably farmed at Kakapo Bay. Guard died on 9 November 1857 and was buried at Kakapo Bay. He and Betty Guard had eight children in total. His gravesite was restored in 2021 by descendants.
