= Southward (surname) =

Southward is a surname. Notable people with the surname include:

- Alan J. Southward (1928–2007), British marine biologist
- Charles L. Southward (1912–2000), American major general
- Dezmen Southward (born 1990), American football safety
- Ferguson Southward (1898 – 1981), English rugby league footballer of the 1920s
- Ike Southward (1934 – 2006), English rugby league footballer of the 1950s and 1960s
- John Southward (1840 – 1902), English writer
- Len Southward (1905 – 2004), New Zealand engineer, businessman, and vehicle collector
- Nigel Southward, British doctor
- Walter Southward (1902 – 1977), English Archdeacon in New Zealand

== See also ==
- Southward Car Museum
- MS Southward, a cruise ship
- Southbound (disambiguation)
- Southern (surname)
