= 1978 Birthday Honours (New Zealand) =

Awards list for New Zealand

The 1978 Queen's Birthday Honours in New Zealand, celebrating the official birthday of Elizabeth II, were appointments made by the Queen in her right as Queen of New Zealand, on the advice of the New Zealand government, to various orders and honours to reward and highlight good works by New Zealanders. They were announced on 3 June 1978.

The recipients of honours are displayed here as they were styled before their new honour.

== Knight Bachelor ==
- William Glendinning Rodger OBE JP – of Auckland. For services to the accountancy profession.
- James Albert Wicks – of Wellington. For services as a stipendiary magistrate.

== Order of Saint Michael and Saint George ==
=== Knight Commander (KCMG) ===
- The Honourable Donald Norman McKay – of Waipu. For public services.
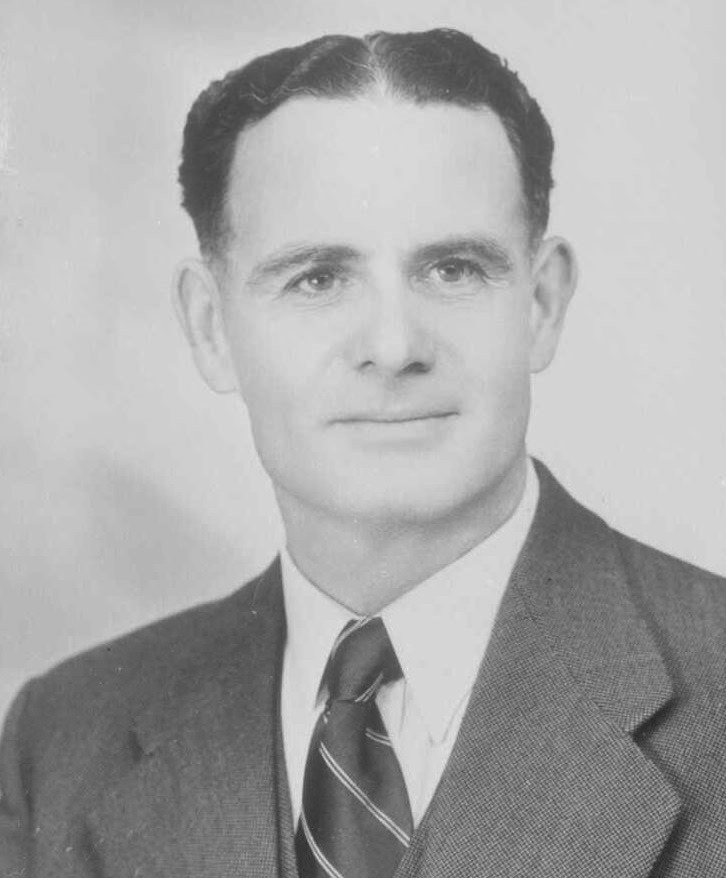
Sir Don McKay

=== Companion (CMG) ===
- Frank Richardson Askin – of Wellington. For services as Commissioner of Works (1969–1972) and lately as deputy chairman of the University Grants Committee.
- Cyril John Keppel – of Auckland. For services to the aviation industry, lately as chairman of Air New Zealand Limited.

== Order of the British Empire ==
=== Knight Commander (KBE) ===
Civil division

- Hallam Walter Dowling CBE – of Taradale. For services to local-body and community affairs.

=== Commander (CBE) ===
Civil division

- Alexander John Black – of Dunedin. For services to the community and science.
- Dr Eric Mitchell Elder OBE – of Tuatapere. For services to the community.
- Walter Arnold Hadlee OBE – of Christchurch. For services to cricket.
- Donald Derek Merritt MBE JP – of Nelson. For services to the transport industry and the community.
- Robert Stuart Milne – of Auckland. For services to the City of Auckland.
- Dr Lindsay Russell Wallace FRSNZ – of Morrinsville; lately director of the Ruakura Agricultural Research Centre, Ministry of Agriculture & Fisheries.
- David Graeme Whyte – of Wellington. For services to the community, especially as president of the New Zealand Red Cross Society.

Military division

- Air Commodore Michael Frank McDonald Palmer – Royal New Zealand Air Force, Defence Headquarters, Wellington.
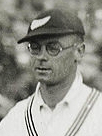
Walter Hadlee

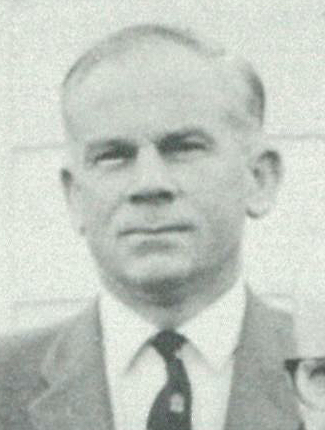
Lindsay Wallace

=== Officer (OBE) ===
Civil division

- Austin Graham Bagnall – of Eastbourne. For services to New Zealand literature and the library profession.
- Roger Fairbairn Ballantyne – of Christchurch. For services to the community.
- Ralph John Ballinger JP – of Blenheim. For services to horticulture and the community.
- Shirley Morris Bohm – of Upper Hutt; lately director of nursing, Department of Health.
- Albert William Bryant – of Hamilton. For services to music and the community.
- The Reverend Jim Bernard Chambers – of Wellington. For services to the community, especially as chairman of the Congregational Union of New Zealand since 1969.
- Alexander Annis Corban – of Henderson. For services to the viticultural industry.
- Edward Charles Stuart Falconer JP – of Dunedin. For services to the community.
- The Very Reverend Edward Frances Farr – of Auckland. For services to the Presbyterian Church.
- Maxwell Rae Grierson – of Auckland. For services to the community.
- John Joseph Loftus – of Lower Hutt; lately deputy secretary of defence, Ministry of Defence.
- James Warwick Fraser Macky – of Auckland. For services to medicine and the community.
- Robert Patrick Magill JP – of Napier. For services to the YMCA and community.
- Dennis Raoul Hillel Nathan – of Auckland. For services to the deaf.
- Eric Pearce JP – of Nelson. For services to trade-union, educational and local-body affairs.
- Andrew Henri Phillips – of Wellington. For services to the New Zealand Returned Services Association as general secretary.
- Leonard Bingley Southward – of Paraparaumu. For services to the community.
- Francis Gordon Trotman – of Foxton. For services to the New Zealand Civilian Amputees Association and the community.
- Evan Wilfrid Williams – of Auckland. For services to dentistry.

Military division

- Captain Denis Hyland O'Donoghue – Royal New Zealand Navy.
- Colonel Peter Noel Leslie ED – Royal New Zealand Army Medical Corps (Territorial Force).
- Group Captain John Dempster Waugh – Royal New Zealand Air Force.

=== Member (MBE) ===
Civil division

- Cyril Leslie Allen – of Auckland. For services to the deaf.
- Roy Francis Beadle JP – of Greymouth. For services to the trade-union movement.
- Ivan James Berghan – of Ahipara. For services to local-body affairs.
- Patrick Blanchfield JP MP – of Greymouth. For services to the community as the Member of Parliament for West Coast since 1960.
- Edwin Victor Calkin JP – of Marton. For services to local-body and community affairs.
- Robert Campbell JP – of Rotorua. For services to local-body and community affairs.
- Basil Frederick Ebbett – of Eketāhuna. For services to local-body and farming affairs.
- Iain Watson Gallaway – of Dunedin. For services to rugby and cricket.
- Ian Duncan Gilchrist – of Gore. For services to horticulture.
- Gladys Ivy Goffin – of Napier; brigadier, Salvation Army. For services to the community.
- Arnold Fraser Grant – of Dunedin. For services to paraplegics.
- Dr Cyril Ashley Heaphy – of Nelson. For services to the community.
- Allen Francis Higgs – of Tāneatua. For services to the community.
- Henry James Hargest Horrell ED – of Dunedin. For services to the community.
- Gladys Lucy Hudson – of Levin. For services to the community.
- Harold David London JP – of Tūrangi. For services to the preservation of local history.
- Kathleen Ellen Joyce McCann – of Tītahi Bay. For services to netball.
- Winifred MacDonald – of Auckland. For services to the preservation of local history.
- Meda-Therese McKenzie – of Wellington. For being the first New Zealand woman to swim Cook Strait and the first person to swim Cook Strait in both directions.
- Terence Power McLean – of Auckland. For services to sporting literature.
- David Erskine Neave JP – of Kurow. For services to local-body affairs.
- Winifred Laura O'Halloran – of Gisborne. For services to the Girl Guide movement.
- William Gordon Parker JP – of Te Awamutu. For services to farming and the community.
- Patrick Stewart Revell – chief superintendent, New Zealand Police.
- Robert James Skelton – of Auckland. For services to horse racing as a jockey.
- Bertram Oliver Stokes – of Auckland. For services to the Victoria League.
- Sonny Henry White – of Reporoa. For services to agriculture.
- Alma Woods – of Auckland. For services to the theatre and community.

Military division

- Lieutenant (Special Duties) (Band) Donald Carpenter – Royal New Zealand Navy.
- Lieutenant Commander John Trevor Herd – Royal New Zealand Navy.
- Warrant Officer Class II Brian Michael Colbourne – Royal New Zealand Army Ordnance Corps.
- Warrant Officer Class I Ernest Mathew Dix BEM – Royal New Zealand Electrical and Mechanical Engineers.
- Warrant Officer Class I William David Anthony Hayward – Royal New Zealand Infantry Regiment.
- Captain Paul Tekatene McAndrew – Royal New Zealand Infantry Regiment.
- Squadron Leader Robert Alexander Keown – Royal New Zealand Air Force.
- Warrant Officer Henry Thomas Mitchell – Royal New Zealand Air Force.
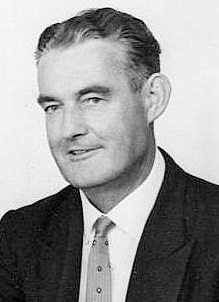
Paddy Blanchfield

== British Empire Medal (BEM) ==
Military division

- Chief Petty Officer Paul Ernest Cherry – Royal New Zealand Navy.
- Marine Engineering Mechanician First Class David Irving Llewellin – Royal New Zealand Navy.
- Petty Officer Weapon Mechanic Leonard Arnold Charles Sears – Royal New Zealand Navy.
- Sergeant Michael Anthony Cunningham – Royal New Zealand Infantry Regiment.
- Sergeant Peter Oliver Ramsay – Royal New Zealand Army Medical Corps.
- Flight Sergeant John Charles Devescovi – Royal New Zealand Air Force.
- Sergeant William John Price – Royal New Zealand Air Force.

== Companion of the Queen's Service Order (QSO) ==
=== For community service ===
- Hera Katene Horvath – of Upper Hutt.
- Cyril Stanley Jenkin – of Auckland.
- Albert Henry Marker JP – of Christchurch.
- Gwenyth Pearson – of Balclutha.
- Tupinia Te Para Burrows Puriri JP – of Paihia.
- Elsie Ward – of Levin; major, Salvation Army.

=== For public services ===
- Eric Arthur Batson – of Putorino.
- Malcolm James Conway – of Wellington, lately Director-General of Forests.
- Dr Allan Gordon Cumming – of Palmerston North.
- Catherine Hamilton Hunter – of Wellington.
- James Gilbert Laurenson ED JP – of Christchurch; lately chief executive, North Canterbury Hospital Board.
- Dr Francis Russell Miller – of Invercargill; mayor of the City of Invercargill.
- Anthony Charles Morcom-Green – of Auckland; chairman of the Children's Health Camps Board.
- Kuru Waaka – of Rotorua; director, New Zealand Māori Arts and Crafts Institute.
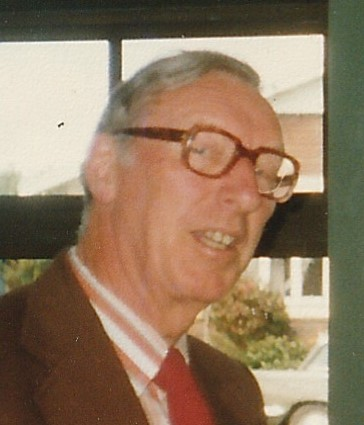
Russell Miller

== Queen's Service Medal (QSM) ==
=== For community service ===
- Wattie Pukauae Barclay MM – of Paihia.
- Irene Ball – of Masterton.
- Gladys Mary Bestic – of Rotorua.
- Ada May Butchers – of Timaru.
- Lindsay Raymond Harrison Clark – of Ōpōtiki.
- Mavis Elizabeth Clayton – of Waitara.
- Annie Doris Coward – of Whangārei.
- Florence Mary Day – of Invercargill.
- Helen McLellan Dykes – of Napier.
- Richard Meddins Evans – of Wellington.
- Ela Hutchison – of Auckland.
- Alfred Charles Kennerley – of Levin.
- Stella Rosalie Kilpatrick – of Auckland.
- Charles Edward King – of Auckland.
- Eleanor Francis King – of Ōhiwa Harbour, Bay of Plenty.
- Zillah Jean Liley JP – of Waiheke Island.
- Clarice Maud Lilly – of Christchurch.
- Frederick Hubert McCluskey JP – of Wellington.
- Kevin John Marlow JP – of Dunedin.
- Keith Robert Mitchell – of Wellington.
- Maera Moke JP – of Hamilton.
- Douglas John Moore – of Mount Maunganui.
- Vera Kirihau Morgan – of Wellington.
- The Reverend Cyril Joseph Rutherford Price – of Hamilton.
- Harold Ernest Rance – of Otautau.
- Eva Gladys Richards JP – of Wellington.
- Catherine Mary Rush – of Palmerston North.
- Mary Patricia Snaddon – of Ormondville.
- Agnes Edsell Stafford – of Palmerston North.
- Charles Douglas Stewart – of Dunedin.
- Bernice Joyce Thompson – of Christchurch.
- James Leslie Woodhouse JP – of Ōhura.

=== For public services ===
- Stanley Francis Body JP – of Te Aroha.
- Nancy Kathleen Campbell – of Lyttelton.
- Dr Cedric Claude Day – of Auckland.
- Norman Wong Doo – of Auckland.
- The Reverend Rex Charles Ratcliffe Goldsmith – of Tawa; senior prison chaplain, Department of Justice.
- Douglas Haig Goulden – of Southbridge.
- Doris May Graham – of Oamaru.
- Lillian Louisa Henshaw JP – of Auckland.
- Norman Henry Lanham JP – of Woodville.
- Rex Day Lovell-Smith – of Cheviot.
- Dr Margaret Martin McDowall – of Ngāruawāhia.
- Molly Felton Morrison JP, of Matapouri.
- Charles Alexander Pilgrim JP – of Christchurch.
- Marie Joan Plunkett JP – of Dunedin,
- Rhoda Mary Read JP – of Morrinsville.
- Adrian Claude Roberts – of Wellington; lately senior advisory officer (personnel), New Zealand Electricity Department.
- George Lionel Gordon Sharp JP – of Pukekohe.
- Pehimana Tamati – of New Plymouth.
- Andria Tolich – sergeant, New Zealand Police.
- Theo Wylie – of Tūrangi; chief instructor, Rangipo Prison Farm, Department of Justice.
- Genevieve Mary Irene Young – of Waikanae Beach; senior district nurse (Waikanae), Palmerston North Hospital Board.

== Queen's Fire Service Medal (QFSM) ==
- Alan Ewart Chapman – senior fire safety officer, Timaru Fire Brigade.
- Noel Cecil Glen – divisional officer, Auckland Fire Brigade.
- Thomas Richard Luckie – chief fire officer, Queenstown Volunteer Fire Brigade.

== Queen's Police Medal (QPM) ==
- Robert Andrew Henderson – constable, New Zealand Police.

== Air Force Cross (AFC) ==
- Squadron Leader John Willingham Hewson – Royal New Zealand Air Force.

== Queen's Commendation for Valuable Service in the Air ==
- Squadron Leader Arthur Ross Marbeck – Royal New Zealand Air Force.
