= Ron Heath =

Oceanographer in New Zealand

Ronald Allan Heath
- Born: 1944 (age 81–82)
- Education: BSc, University of Canterbury; PhD Victoria University of Wellington
- Scientific career
- Fields: Physical oceanography
- Workplaces: N.Z. Oceanographic Institute, University of Otago

Ronald Allan Heath, is a retired oceanographer and university administrator. His research focus was on the physical oceanography of the oceans around New Zealand.

== Education and career ==
Heath was born in Motueka in 1944. He attended the University of Canterbury where he gained a B.Sc. in physics and later was awarded a PhD by the Victoria University of Wellington. He joined the N.Z. Oceanographic Institute (NZOI) in 1967, rising to deputy director in 1982 and then as Director in 1986 when Des Hurley stepped down from the role. Through various name changes Heath remained as Director of DSIR Marine and Freshwater until the point at which it was disestablished and became part of the new Crown Research Institute NIWA. The NZOI remained a distinct group within NIWA for a number of years. In 1994 Heath left NIWA to become the Assistance Vice-Chancellor (Science) at the University of Otago in Dunedin. Heath retired in 2004, to be replaced by Vernon Squire.

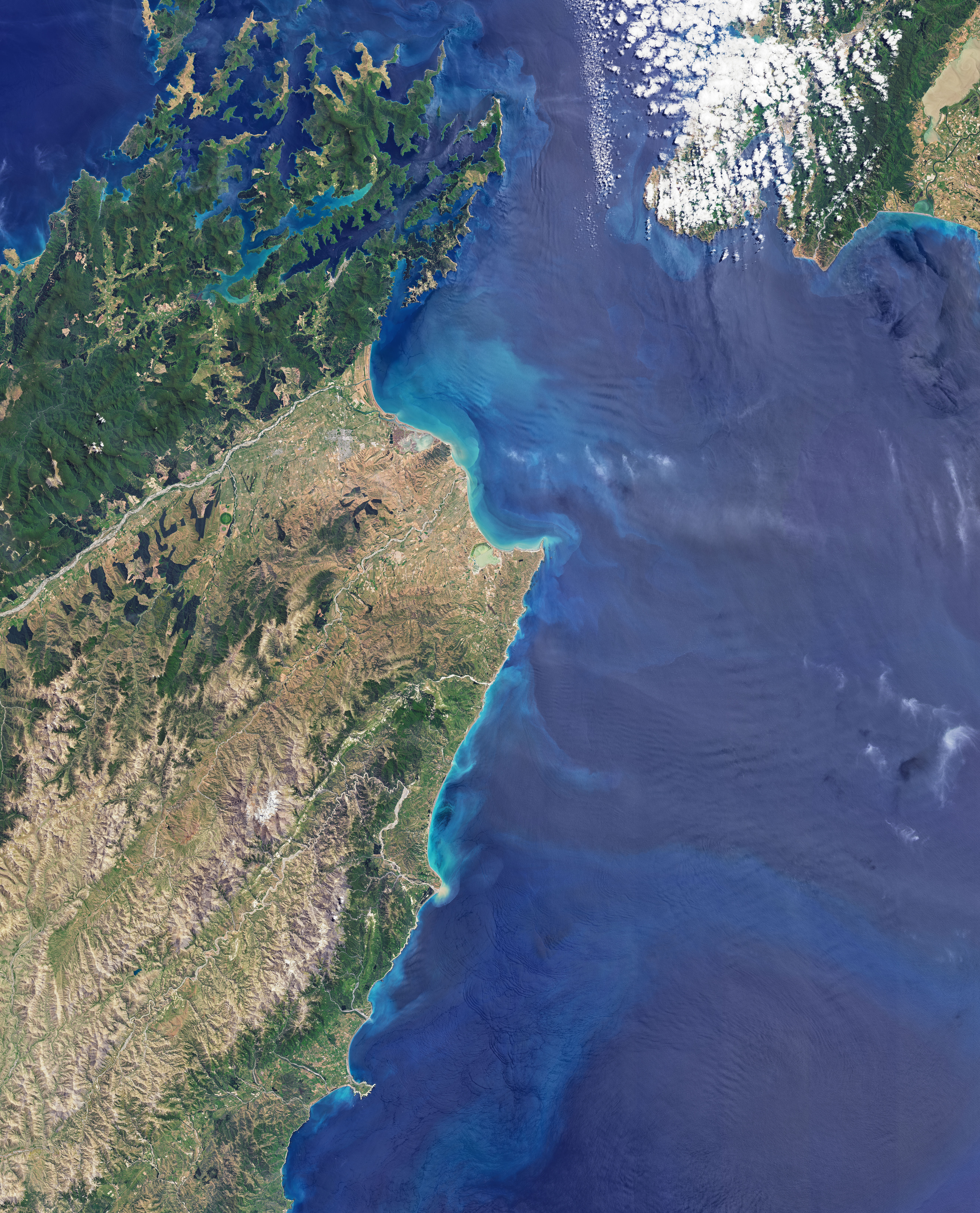
Cook Strait and the upper east coast of New Zealand's South Island. Heath quantified the tidal mechanics of the region.

He had significant involvement in oceanographic organisations including presidency of the N.Z. Marine Sciences Association, membership of the IUGG Tsunami Committee and the SCOR Working Group on General Circulation of the Southern Ocean.

== Science and impact ==
Heath was the leading N.Z. physical oceanographer of his era, writing papers on most aspects of the region's physical oceanography. Heath provided a summary of this work at the time in a major review that sought to "review the physical oceanography of the seas around New Zealand as known up to 1982 and includes: deep-ocean water characteristics and mean flow; fronts, tides, and coastal and continental shelf oceanography; and waves and tsunamis". The paper concluded with the forward-looking perspective on the future advances possible with the, at the time new, satellite sensing capability.

He was notable for developing understanding of a number of key aspects of the oceans around New Zealand in a time when ocean data were difficult to obtain and numerical simulation tools were embryonic. He developed early understanding of the tidal mechanics of Cook Strait/Te Moana-o-Raukawa and the presence of a virtual amphidrome. He also calculated an early estimate of the net flux through Cook Strait. This estimate wasn't superseded until 2021 when a new computer model estimate was published. Heath's Cook Strait work was notable also for its use of the tracks of swimmers crossing the 25 km-wide Cook Strait as a form of tracer.

Heath published some of the early work on ocean circulation in Southern McMurdo Sound, Antarctica. This work was notable in that they used explosives to access the ocean and then used various drifting vane approaches to quantifying ocean currents. This early work refers to the McMurdo Ice Shelf as "fast ice" something that is now known to be incorrect.

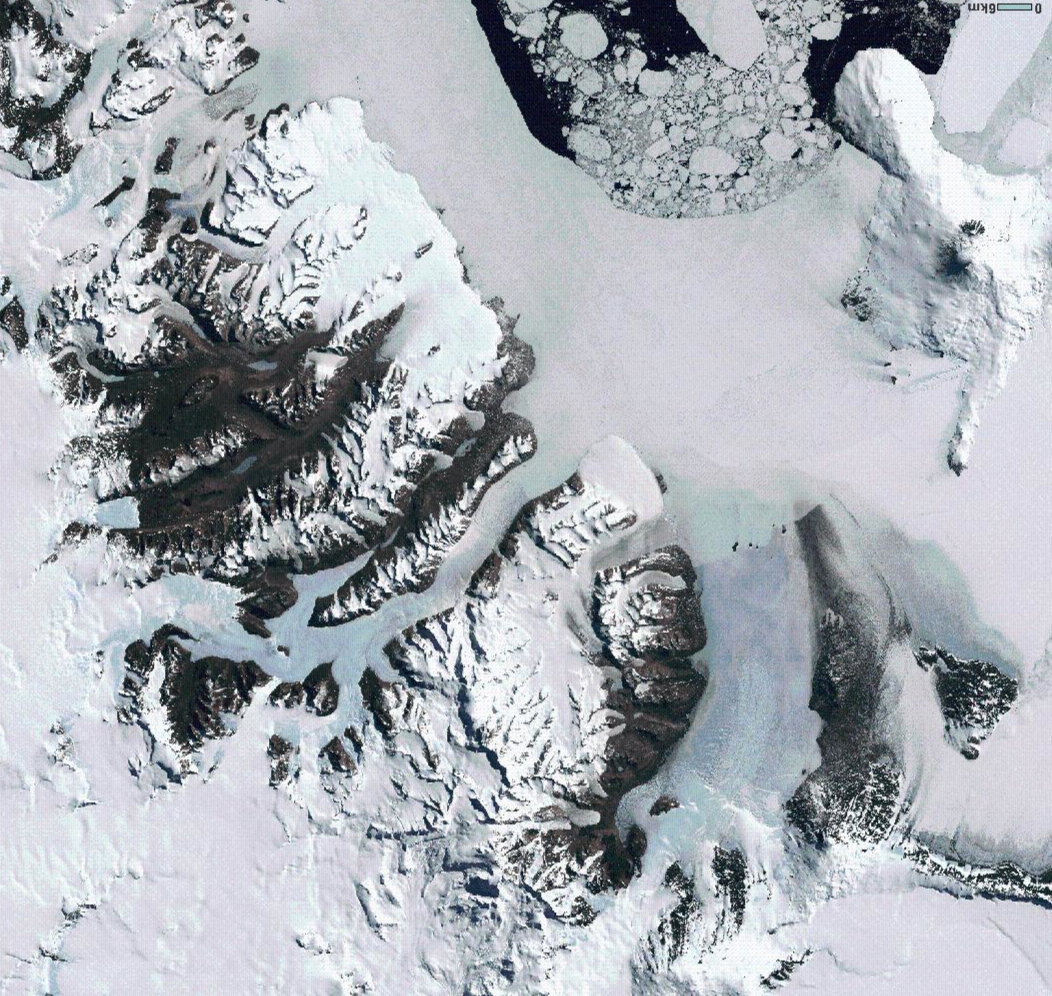
McMurdo Sound (LIMA image) and the region that Heath sampled

Among the many regions around New Zealand that Heath published on was the circulation in and around Tasman and Golden Bays. This double-bay opens out to Greater Cook Strait. Heath used drift cards to examine how the wind influenced the shallow bays. This work remained as the only systematic oceanographic study in the region until the work nearly 50 years later from Chiswell who used modern oceanographic instruments.

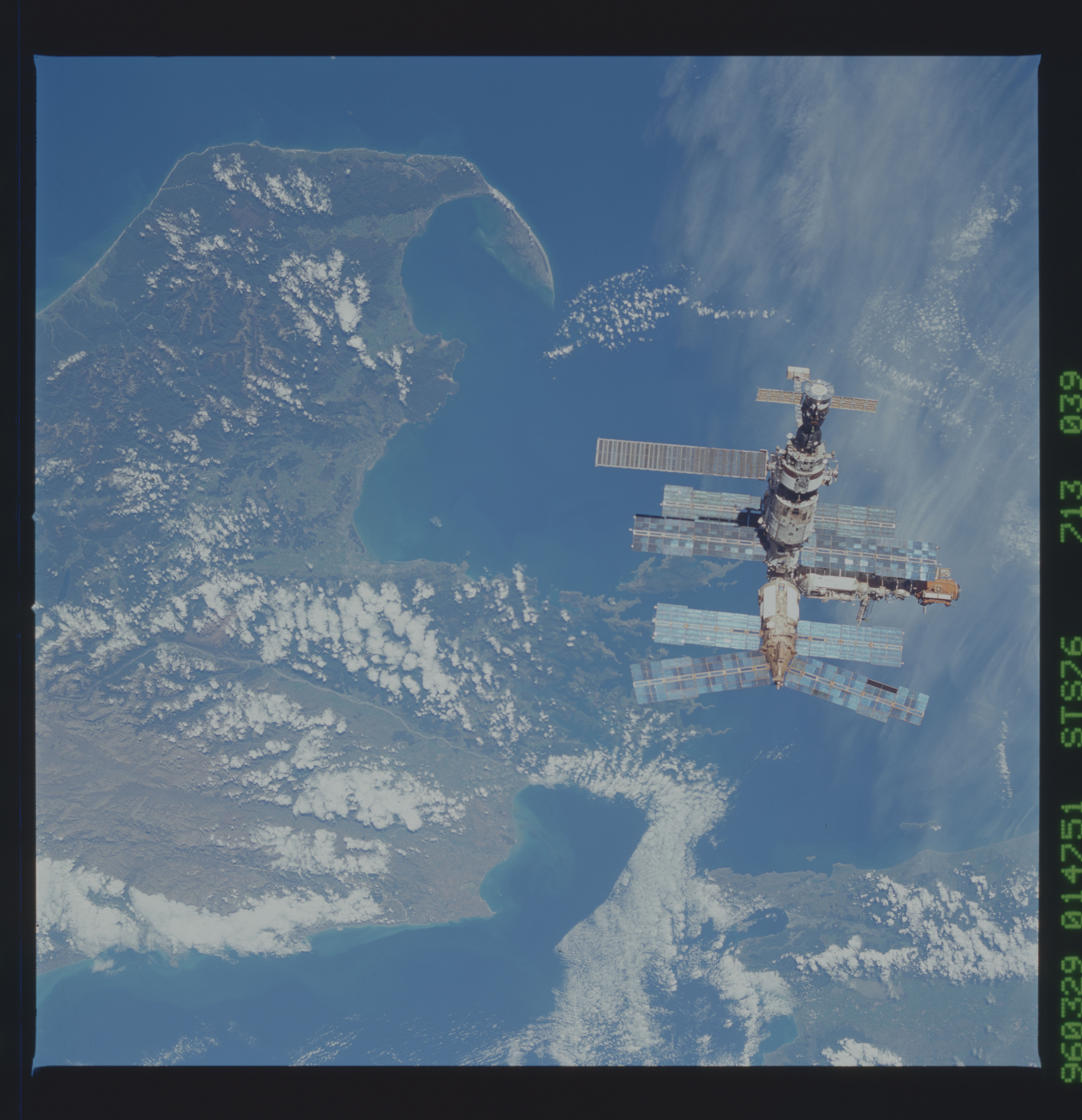
STS076-713-039 - STS-076 - Mir Space Station views of Tasman and Golden Bay, a region surveyed by Heath in the early 1970s

He also led biophysical oceanographic studies, unusual for the time. These included collaboration with Janet Grieve on phytoplankton production over the Campbell Plateau, the large shallow region to the south east of New Zealand that forms part of the Zealandia submerged continent.
