= Meda McKenzie =

New Zealand swimmer (born 1963)

Meda McKenzie MBE
Personal information
- Born: Meda-Therese McKenzie; 1963 (age 62–63) Wellington, New Zealand

Sport
- Sport: Swimming
- Strokes: Long-distance swimming

Meda-Therese McKenzie MBE (born 1963), generally known as Meda McKenzie, is a former New Zealand long-distance swimmer, who was inducted into the New Zealand Sports Hall of Fame in 1996.

At fifteen she swam Cook Strait, and later (in 1978) swam it in the opposite direction. She also swam Foveaux Strait; and in England the English Channel and a double crossing of the Bristol Channel.

After retiring to raise two children, she returned after five years to swim across Lake Erie in Canada, and two firsts: the first double crossing of Cook Strait by a woman and a circumnavigation of Rarotonga.

In the 1978 Queen's Birthday Honours, McKenzie was appointed a Member of the Order of the British Empire, for being the first New Zealand woman to swim Cook Strait and the first person to swim Cook Strait in both directions.
