= Graham Bagnall =

New Zealand librarian, bibliographer and historian

Austin Graham Bagnall OBE (30 November 1912 – 16 April 1986) was a New Zealand librarian, bibliographer and historian. He was born in Auckland, New Zealand, on 30 November 1912.

In the 1978 Queen's Birthday Honours, Bagnall was appointed an Officer of the Order of the British Empire, for services to New Zealand literature and the library profession.
