= Janet Grieve =

New Zealand biological oceanographer (1940–2025)

Janet Grieve ONZM
- Born: Janet Mary Grieve; 11 February 1940; Christchurch, New Zealand
- Died: 16 August 2025 (aged 85); Wellington, New Zealand
- Other names: Janet Bradford-Grieve; Janet Bradford
- Education: University of Canterbury
- Known for: Global expert on copepod biosystematics
- Spouse: Max Bradford (m. 1967; div. 1991)
- Scientific career
- Fields: Biological oceanography
- Workplaces: New Zealand Oceanographic Institute; Smithsonian; National Institute of Water and Atmospheric Research
- Thesis: The annual cycle of plankton off Kaikoura (1966)
- Doctoral advisor: George Knox

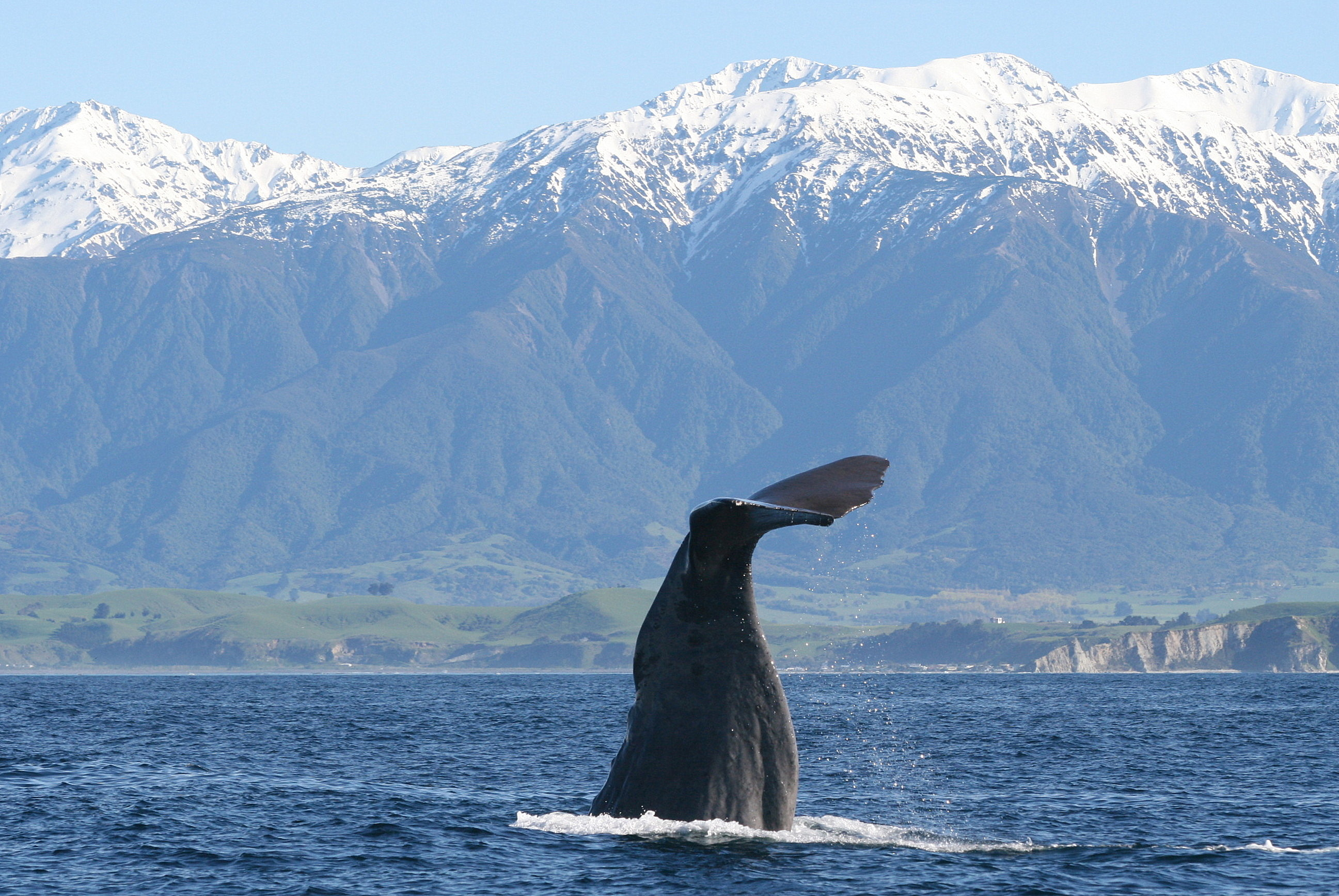
Diving sperm whale near Kaikōura. Grieve made the first measurements of ocean biological productivity that supports this ecosystem.

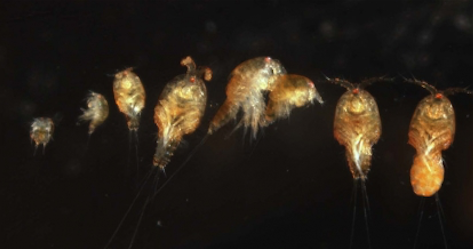
Copepods - different T. brevicornis developmental stages. Note the mating pair (third from the right).

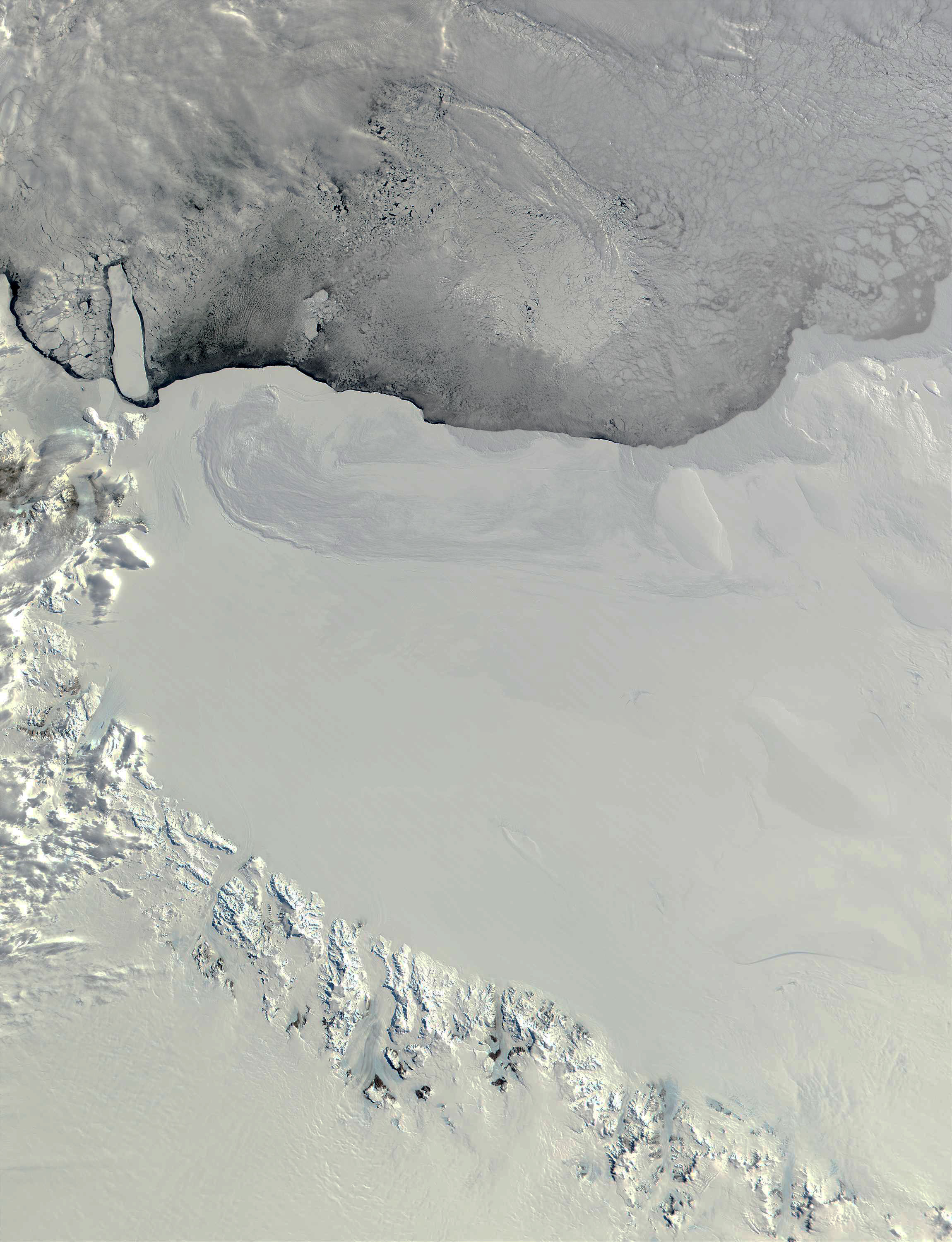
Ross Ice Shelf. Grieve worked at the J-9 location in the shelf centre in the mid-1970s.

Grieve was involved in environmental impact studies of the NZ Maui Gas field. This figure shows gas production.

Janet Mary Grieve ONZM (11 February 1940 – 16 August 2025), also known as Janet Bradford-Grieve and Janet Bradford, was a New Zealand biological oceanographer. She researched extensively on marine taxonomy and biological productivity. She was president of both the New Zealand Association of Scientists (1998–2000) and the World Association of Copepodologists (2008–2011).

== Early life and family ==
Born in Christchurch on 11 February 1940, Grieve was the daughter of Joyce Linda Grieve (née Govan) and William Anderson Grieve. She was educated at Christchurch Girls' High School, and went on to study at the University of Canterbury, from where she graduated with a Bachelor of Science (Honours) degree on 9 May 1963.

In March 1967, Grieve became engaged to Max Bradford, and they married later that year. The couple divorced in 1991.

== Early career ==
Grieve's PhD research, supervised by George Knox at the University of Canterbury, developed new observations in copepod taxonomy but also produced insights into the processes affecting zooplankton in Kaikōura submarine canyon. Her pioneering research in this canyon provides a baseline for the biological and physical changes associated with the 2016 Kaikōura earthquake.

Immediately after her PhD, Grieve joined the New Zealand Oceanographic Institute, a section within the New Zealand Department of Scientific and Industrial Research, as a scientist. She broke this with a period as a visiting scholar at the Smithsonian Institution, researching copepod taxonomy for a time (1970–1973).

Grieve participated in the Ross Ice Shelf Project expedition to the central Ross Ice Shelf. The team successfully bored through the ice shelf in 1977 to retrieve data and samples in the ice shelf cavity. She continued with the New Zealand Oceanographic Institute and remained when it was absorbed into National Institute of Water and Atmospheric Research (NIWA).

== Science and impact ==
Publishing under surnames Grieve, Bradford and Bradford-Grieve, she made a significant contribution to the fields of biological oceanography in New Zealand and internationally. She was responsible for some of the first measurements of open ocean productivity in New Zealand waters. Her research extended from the subtropics to the Antarctic/Southern Ocean. She researched topics such as ocean food webs and ecology, and was regarded as the global expert on copepod biosystematics.

Grieve was a key researcher involved in the environmental survey work that underpinned and guided the development of the Maui oil and gas production facilities within the Taranaki Bight. This was one of the first marine developments to consider detailed environmental management. She was also on the Task Force group responsible for reviewing New Zealand's fisheries legislation in 1991–1992.

== Science leadership ==
Grieve was manager of the Marine and Freshwater Division of the NZOI, DSIR (1989–1991). She was president of the New Zealand Association of Scientists (1998–2000), and president of the World Association of Copepodologists (2008–2011).

== Later life ==
After retiring from NIWA in 2004, Grieve continued some work there as an emeritus scientist for many years. She died in Wellington on 16 August 2025, at the age of 85.

== Honours and awards ==
In 1990, Grieve was awarded the New Zealand 1990 Commemoration Medal. She was elected a Fellow of the Royal Society of New Zealand in 2003. In the 2007 Queen's Birthday Honours, she was appointed an Officer of the New Zealand Order of Merit, for services to marine science. In 1995, she received the New Zealand Marine Sciences Society Award.

In 2017, Grieve was selected as one of the Royal Society Te Apārangi's "150 women in 150 words", celebrating the contributions of women to knowledge in New Zealand.

== Selected publications ==
- Systematics and ecology of New Zealand central east coast plankton sampled at Kaikoura, 1972
- New parasitic Choniostomatidae (Copepoda) mainly from Antarctic and Subantarctic Ostracoda, 1975
- The marine fauna of New Zealand : pelagic calanoid copepods : families Euchaetidae, Phaennidae, Scolecithricidae, Diaixidae, and Tharybidae, 1980
- New Zealand region primary productivity, surface, 1980
- New Zealand region, zooplankton biomass 0-200m., 1980
- The marine fauna of New Zealand. Megacalanidae, Calanidae, Paracalanidae, Mecynoceridae, Eucalanidae, Spinocalanidae, Clausocalanidae , 1994
- The marine fauna of New Zealand : Pelagic Copepoda : Poecilostomatoida:Oncaeidae, 1995
- The marine fauna of New Zealand. Bathypontiidae, Arietellidae, Augaptilidae, Heterorhabdidae, Lucicutiidae, Metridinidae, Phyllopodidae, Centropagidae, Pseudodiaptomidae, Temoridae, Candaciidae, Pontellidae, Sulcanidae, Acartiidae, Tortanidae, 1999
