= Westbound =

Westbound is an adjective meaning "movement towards the west". It may refer to:

- Westbound, a 1924 film starring J. B. Warner and Molly Malone
- Westbound (film), a 1959 American western film
- "Westbound" (The Zeta Project episode)
- Westbound Records, Detroit-based record label founded in 1970
- "Westbound", a song on Lana Del Rey's Sirens album
- "Westbound", a song on Allister's Last Stop Suburbia album
- "Westbound", a song on Blue Mountain's Blue Mountain album

== See also ==
- Southbound (disambiguation)
