= Southbound =

Southbound is an adjective meaning movement towards the south.

Southbound may also refer to:

- Southbound (festival), Australian music festival
- Southbound (publisher), Malaysian publishing house based in Penang
- Southbound interface, concept in client-server architecture
- Southbound (magazine), a travel magazine published by Atlanta magazine

== Films ==
- Southbound (2007 film), 2007 Japanese film starring Etsushi Toyokawa
- Southbound (2015 film), 2015 American anthology horror thriller film

== Music ==
- "Southbound" (Carrie Underwood song), from the album Cry Pretty
- Southbound (Doc Watson album)
- Southbound (The Doobie Brothers album)
- Southbound (Hoyt Axton album)
- "Southbound" (Mac McAnally song), from Mac McAnally's album Simple Life; also recorded by Sammy Kershaw on Feelin' Good Train
- "Southbound", song by the Allman Brothers Band from their 1973 album Brothers and Sisters
- "Southbound", song by Thin Lizzy from their 1977 album Bad Reputation
- Southbound Records, a 1970s soul and funk sub label of Ace Records
- "Southbound", song by Artemas from their 2025 album Southbound / test drive

== See also ==
- Westbound (disambiguation)
