= New Zealand Oceanographic Institute =

New Zealand Oceanographic service

The New Zealand Oceanographic Institute (NZOI) was a department within the Division of Marine and Freshwater Science, as part of the Department of Scientific and Industrial Research (DSIR).

Named the New Zealand Oceanographic Institute in 1955 when the scope of the Oceanographic Observatory was broadened to include marine biology and geology. In 1982 the Institute merged with the Freshwater Section of Ecology Division and the divisional name was changed to Division of Marine and Freshwater Science. The Freshwater Section became the Taupo Research Laboratory and in 1980 the NZOI moved into premises at Greta Point, Wellington. The Institute became part of National Institute of Water and Atmospheric Research (NIWA) as part of the changes associated with the 1992 Crown Research Institute Act.

== Leadership ==
James Brodie was a founding staff member of the Oceanographic Institute in 1954 and led it from 1958 until 1977 (he was Superintendent from 1954–1958). He had joined the DSIR in 1945 and was involved in the postwar reconstruction of geophysical work that led to the formation of geophysics division in 1951. As assistant to the director he had particular responsibility for geophysical research and oceanography in what was to become the oceanographic observatory. In 1954 he helped found the Oceanographic Institute, which he led from 1958 to 1977. Brodie's own research centered on pleistocene geology and he published papers that laid regional foundations in fields such as carbon-dating deep ocean waters, ocean floor topography and coastal currents. It was rudimentary science, done by dropping thousands of cards into the sea and recording where they later ended up, but it gave the first cohesive picture of near- shore circulation of coastal waters.

Brodie was succeeded by Desmond Hurley who was Director in the period 1977-1986. A biologist, Hurley trained in New Zealand as well as the University of Southern California. He brought in new management practices and was co-founder of the New Zealand Marine Sciences Society. Hurley was succeeded by Ron Heath who held the directorship from 1986 to 1992. Heath was a physical oceanographer who produced a large body of work on tides and circulation around New Zealand including a number of studies of the unique tides of Cook Strait. Notable among these studies was an examination of the tracks of cross-strait swimmers who were significantly affected by tidal currents. Heath moved to a senior position at the University of Otago in 1994 and was replaced by Douglas Gordon, a fisheries manager who oversaw the transfer to a group within NIWA. Through much of this time, Dr Janet Grieve, a biological oceanographer whose personal research focused on marine taxonomy and biological productivity, was the most senior woman scientist.

== Offices and Laboratories ==
The institute was the first multi-disciplinary marine sciences organisation to be formed outside the United States and Britain. Brodie initially found rooms in chilly Victorian offices above a dress shop at the parliament end of Lambton Quay. It was not until 25 years later in 1980 that NZOI moved into new purpose-built laboratories at Greta Point. This was three years after Brodie had retired at age 57 because he had completed 40 years in the civil service. The building was named after him. The Brodie Building was one of a pair of buildings designed by Toomath Wilson Irvine Anderson Ltd. The institute library held vital expedition reports, some dating back to the 1800s, which continue to be a major asset to research on New Zealand's flora and fauna.

== Vessels ==
Initially, NZOI chartered the ageing cargo-passenger island trader Taranui for two lengthy periods each year. On Taranui, ship's positions were fixed in much the same way that James Cook had used two centuries earlier. Sextant angles fixed positions relative to features ashore or, remote from land, from the sun and stars. After several cloudy days, a ship's position could have a margin of error of tens of nautical miles. Sample position required a further guess based on wire angle and drift. Taranui served oceanography through until the early 1970s.

In 1972, the government bought a damaged but younger German freighter, converted its once refrigerated holds into laboratories and scientists' accommodation, installed a high-resolution seismic sounder/profilers into her hull, and named her Tangaroa. A punch-tape controlled transit satellite navigation system was installed, but position fixes could be many hours apart. She undertook 155 cruises, many to the tropics, until she was damaged in a storm in 1984 and sold for scrap. This first Tangaroa was replaced with a 20-year-old, German, custom-built research vessel, Meteor and renamed Rapuhia on arrival. Bow thrusters and active rudders enabled the ship to maintain station in almost any sea conditions. With the demise of DSIR in 1992, Rapuhia was sold for scrap, and oceanography returned for a while to chartered vessels until the availability of the fisheries research vessel RV Tangaroa.

== Legacy ==
The Institute produced around 1,140 refereed research papers, 102 DSIR monographs, 160 charts of bathymetry, sediments, geological structure, ocean currents and animal distributions, 83 charts of lakes and 450 informational reports. A number of staff continued on as part of NIWA.
