= World Association of Copepodologists =

The World Association of Copepodologists (WAC) is a non-profit organization created to promote research on copepods by facilitating communication among interested specialists.

WAC has about 130 members worldwide. Although the World Association of Copepodologists is composed primarily of university professors and professional researchers, "any person interested in any aspect of the study of Copepoda is eligible for membership."

The business of the WAC is conducted primarily at a business meeting held every three years at the International Conference on Copepoda (ICOC). Since 1987, conferences have been held at venues in Africa, Asia, Europe, North America and South America. The 13th conference was held in July 2017 at the Cabrillo Marine Aquarium in San Pedro, California, United States. The 14th conference is to be held in July 2020 in Kruger National Park in South Africa. Recent conferences have attracted about 250-350 participants.

The WAC assists the local organizers of the ICOCs in sponsoring and organizing workshops associated with these conferences. Most workshops train students in identification and other practical aspects of copepod studies.

Between conferences, communication between members takes place through the society newsletter Monoculus and via such on-line resources as the society website hosted by the [Senckenberg Research Institute] in [Wilhelmshaven] Germany and Internet forums hosted by academic bodies such as the Asociación Latinoamericana de Carcinología and the Virginia Institute of Marine Science. Monoculus, the name of the newsletter, is Latin for "one-eyed" and refers to a shared feature of many members of subclass Copepoda.

== History ==
In 1979, copepodologist Dov Por wrote a letter to the meiofauna newsletter Psammonalia suggesting the creation of both a symposium and a newsletter dedicated to the discussion of the Copepoda. There was a small response to this initiative, which increased when the suggestion was repeated in Crustaceana, a publication dedicated to crustaceans.

In 1980, a circular letter was sent out to 87 copepodologists around the world, of whom 34 replied. In a second letter, Dov Por announced that the first International Conference on Copepods was to be organized by the copepodologist Jan Stock and was scheduled for August 1981 in Amsterdam, Netherlands. It was also announced that the copepodologist Kurt Schminke would edit the newsletter.

In October 1980 the first issue of Monoculus was published. About 120 copepodologists attended that first conference in Amsterdam and it was deemed a great success.

The Second International Conference on Copepoda was organized by copepodologist Chang-tai Shih and held in August 1984 in Ottawa, Canada. Here it was decided to establish a formal organization, the World Association of Copepodologists. Zbigniew Kabata, a veteran of the Polish resistance movement in World War II, was elected as the first president. Subsequent presidents included Arthur Humes, Geoff Boxshall, Kurt Schminke, Ju-shey Ho, Shin-ichi Uye, Janet Bradford, Rony Huys, Eduardo Suárez-Morales, and Diana Paola Galassi. A popular feature of each conference is the "Maxilliped Lecture" given by the outgoing president, who then passes on the pectoral pendant, a metal maxilliped on a chain, to the incoming president.
