= Walter Southward =

Walter Seddon Southward (b London 1902 – d Christchurch 1977) was the Archdeacon of North Otago from 1955 to 1966; and Archdeacon of Central Otago from 1966 to 1973.

Southward was ordained in 1929 and his first post was as Curate at Timaru. Later he was Vicar of Linwood and then of Avonside. He was general secretary of the Anglican Board of Mission from 1948 until his appointment as Archdeacon.
