= Alan J. Southward =

British marine biologist (1928–2007)

- Born: 17 April 1928; Liverpool
- Died: 27 October 2007 (aged 79)
- Education: University of Liverpool
- Spouse: Eve Southward (1931–2023)
- Scientific career
- Fields: Marine ecology; taxonomy
- Institutions: Marine Biological Association
- Thesis: On the Ecology of the Foreshore of the South of the Isle of Man (1951)

Alan James Southward (17 April 1928 – 27 October 2007) was a British marine biologist who studied marine ecology, barnacles, tube worms, and deep-sea hydrothermal vents. Southward was born and raised in Liverpool, England. He studied at the University of Liverpool. His PhD, obtained for that school in 1951, was on the ecology of the foreshore of the Isle of Man. Southward was a "world expert on the taxonomy of barnacles" and wrote two books on them, but was also interested in the ecology of hydrothermal vents, which he studied with his wife, Eve Southward. He retired in 1987 but continued to work and publish in the field of marine biology until his death in 2007.

== Life and education ==
Southward was born on 17 April 1928 in Liverpool, England. His father worked for Cunard engineering as a shipfitter. As a teenager, Southward attended Liverpool Collegiate School. A meningitis infection around that time (Note: Sources differ on whether he was 14 or 15.) left him deaf. He went on to study at the University of Liverpool; in 1948 (age 20) he earned first-class honours for his zoology work. He obtained a PhD in 1951, working at a biological station on the Isle of Man. His thesis, the result of three years of field work, was titled On the Ecology of the Foreshore of the South of the Isle of Man.

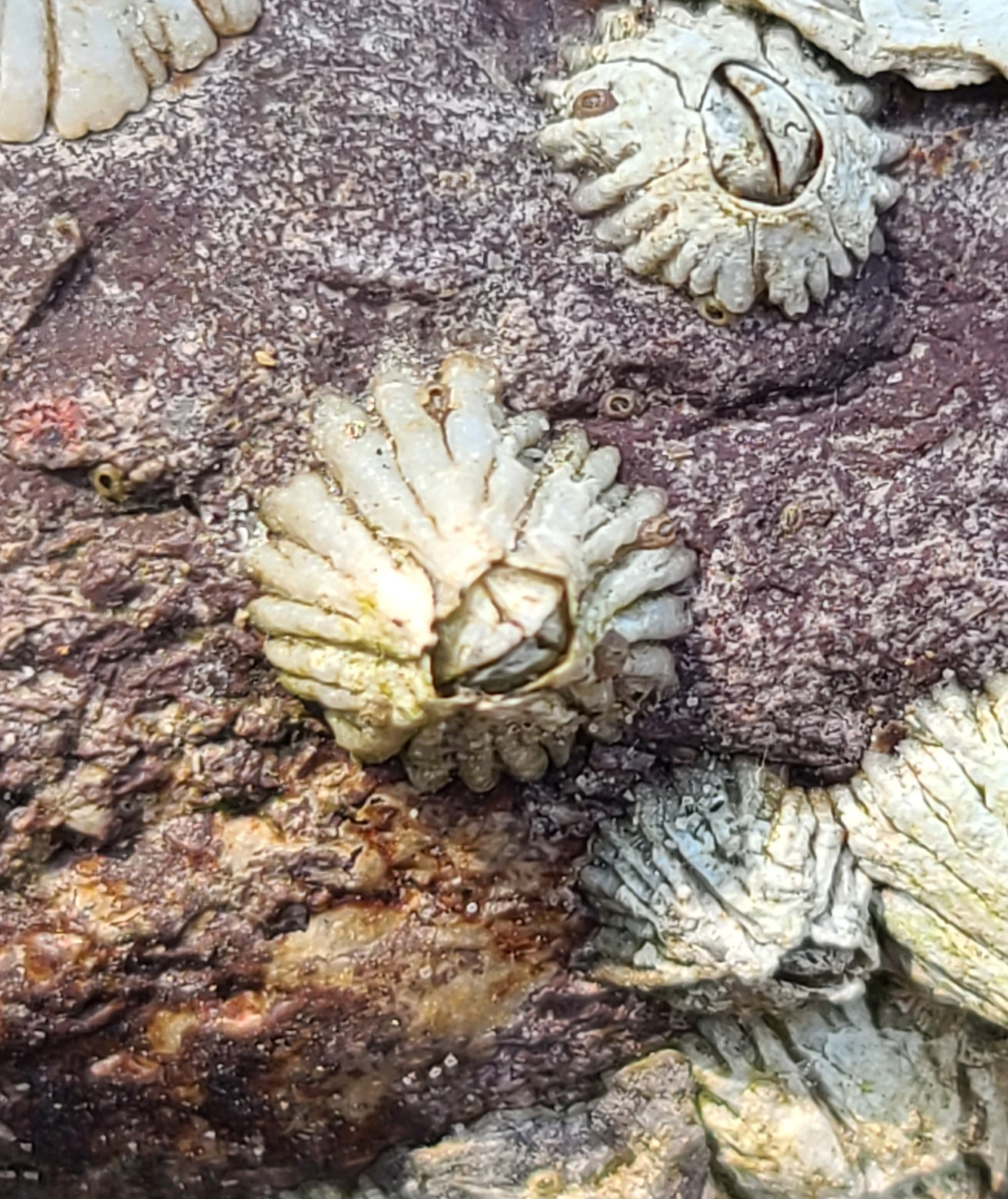
Chthamalus southwardorum, a barnacle discovered in 2007 and named in Southward's honour "for his extensive contribution to the knowledge of the chthamalids"

While working on the Isle of Man, he met Eve Judges and later married her. She was an expert on marine worms and life around hydrothermal vents, and collaborated with him on his work over the next decades. Eve survived him, and died of stroke in 2023, at the age of 92. Alan Southward was quite deaf and learned to lip-read when he was young; his deafness also affected his sense of balance. However, this did give him virtual immunity to sea-sickness; apparently, the only time he felt bothered by it was during a force-12 wind storm. Southward eschewed sign language but was a "greatly proficient lip-reader", assisted by his wife, who took notes for him and accompanied him to meetings.

Southward worked as the editor of Advances in Marine Biology for 20 years. Southward supported Soviet scientists publishing their work in English to reach a broader audience, and helped Russian biologists find funding after the Soviet Union collapsed. He also wrote for newspapers. He was an honorary fellow of the Marine Biological Association and served as vice-chairman of that organization's Devon and Cornwall branch. In 2006, he was made an honorary fellow of the Linnaean Society, and he also served as an honorary professor at the University of Liverpool and the Canadian University of Victoria.

Southward died on 27 October 2007 of a heart attack.

== Research and work ==
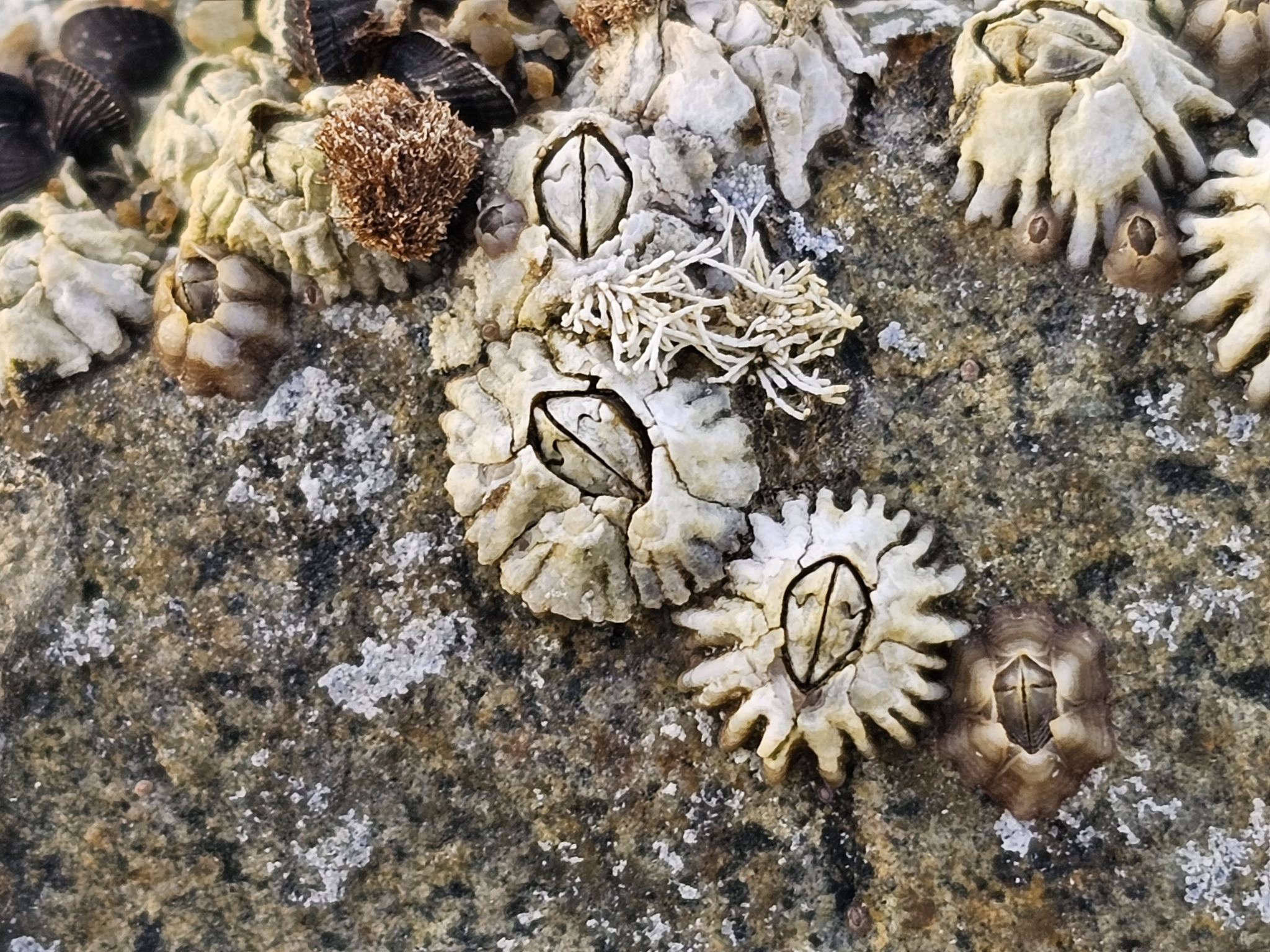
Chthamalus proteus, a barnacle first described in 1980 by Southward and his colleague Paul Dando.

Southward's work focused on the intertidal zone and its ecology, and he spent much of his working life in Plymouth studying the surrounding waters. Starting in 1953, he was employed at the Marine Biological Association's laboratories there. Southward was also a "world expert on the taxonomy of barnacles", studied their biogeography, and wrote two books on the animals, in 1987 and 2008. He studied the aftermath of the 1967 Torrey Canyon oil spill and found that the dispersants used were actually toxic themselves and had dire long-term effects on wildlife. Southward's work beginning in the 1950s centred on the relation between the biogeography of small marine organisms and "minor changes in environmental conditions". This work culminated in the publication of a 1971 paper in Nature by Southward, F. S. Russell, G. T. Bolach, and E. I. Butler titled Changes in Biological Conditions in the English Channel off Plymouth during the Last Half Century, which identified the links between water and chemical conditions and plankton abundance. Later, in the 1970s, he and his wife worked on the biota of deep-sea hydrothermal vents, and the role of chemosynthetic bacteria in those communities. During his retirement, his work focused increasingly on the ecosystems of hydrothermal vents. The University of Victoria offered him a position as adjunct professor to study them in the Pacific Ocean. He also had a life-long interest in pogonophores, a type of tube worm. Southward officially retired from the Marine Biological Association in 1987, when he was almost 60 years old, but continued to work in marine biology: for example, in 2005 he collaborated on a paper in Advances in Marine Biology titled "Long-term oceanographic and ecological research in the Western English Channel".

== Publications ==
Southward contributed some 220 papers over his lifetime, as well as two books:

- Life on the Seashore (1967)
- Barnacle Biology (1987)
- British Barnacles (2008)

British Barnacles was completed a month before he died and published by the Linnean Society.
