= Southward Car Museum =

Car museum in New Zealand

Coordinates: 40.894035°S 175.029224°E

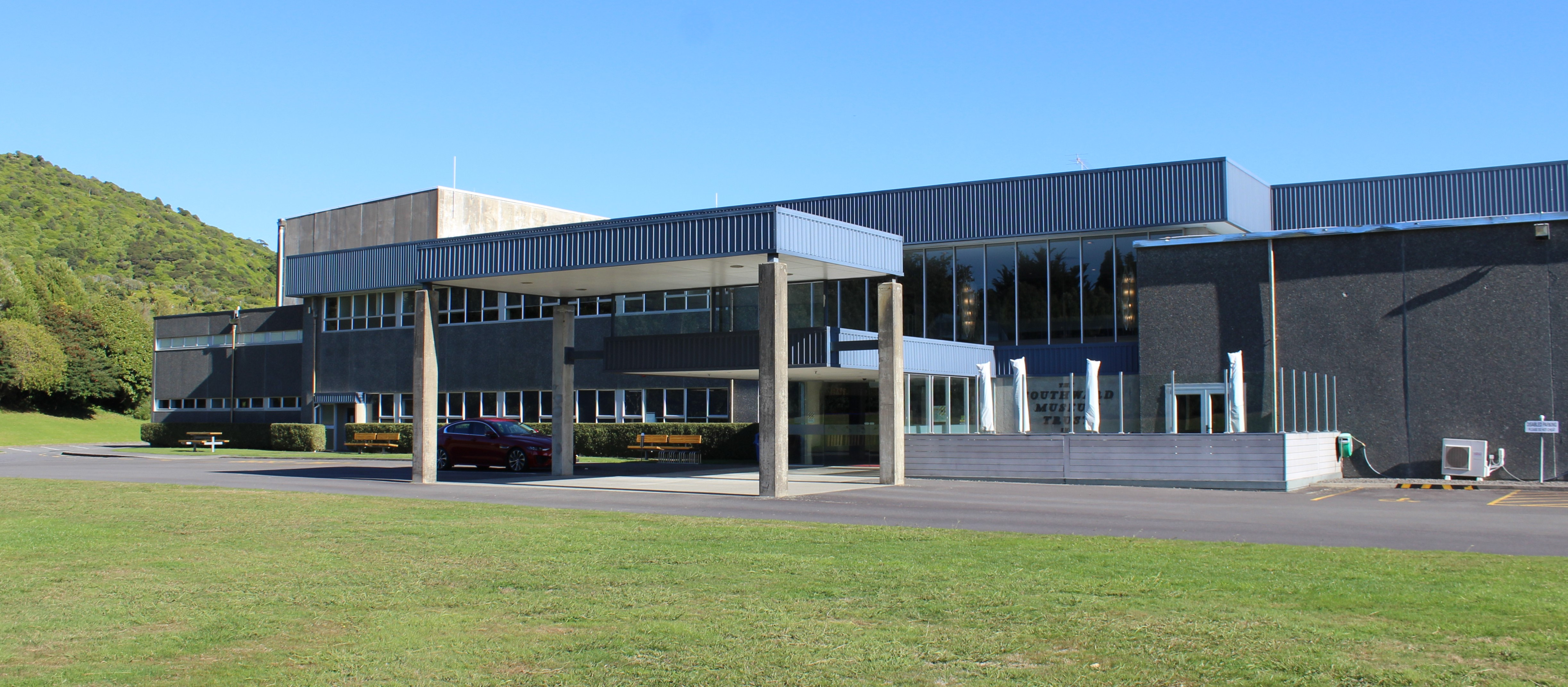
- Established: 22 December 1979; 46 years ago
- Type: Car museum
- Founder: Len Southward
- Website: www.southwardcarmuseum.co.nz

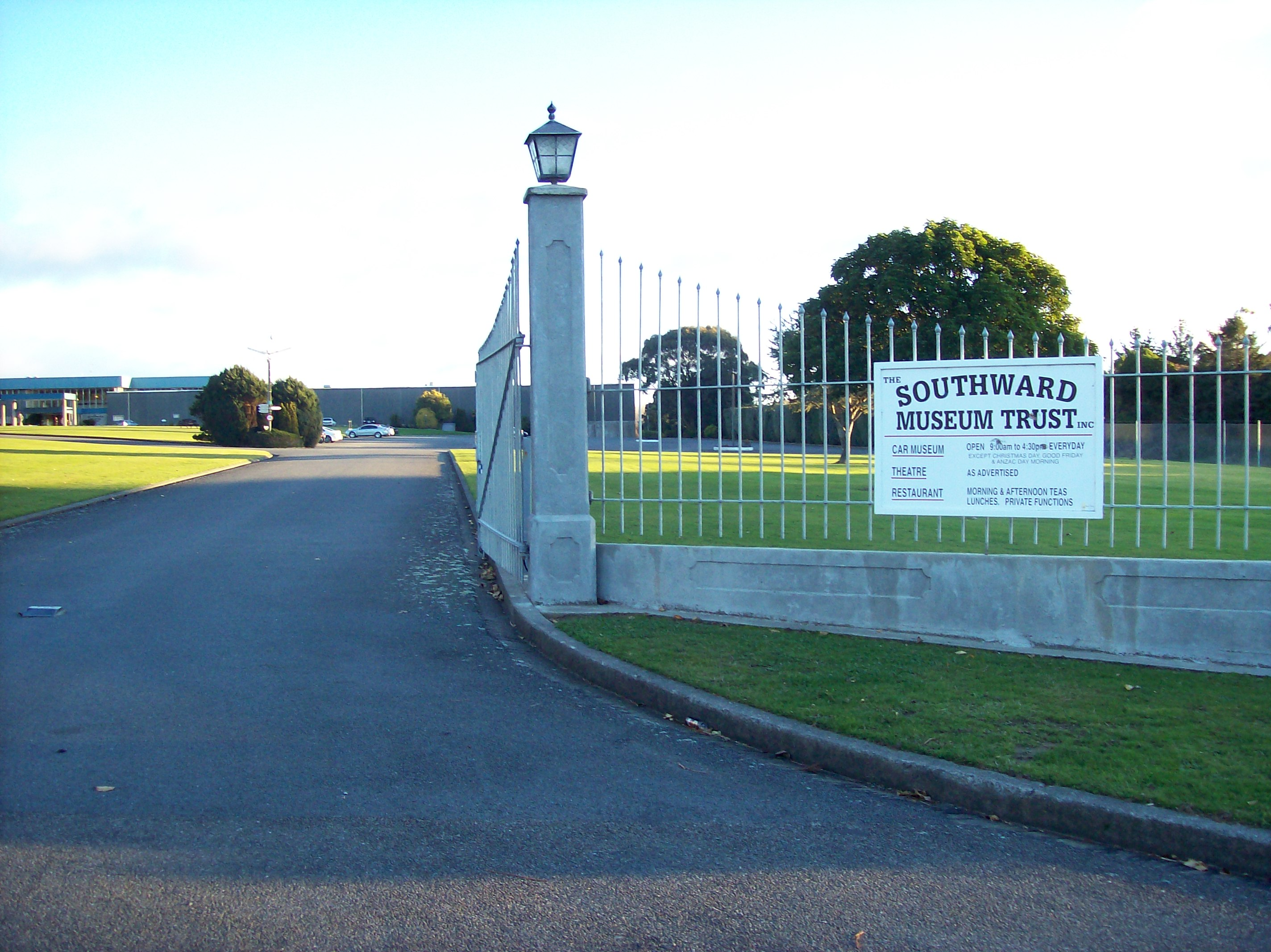
The entrance to Southward Car Museum from Otaihanga Road

The Southward Car Museum is an automobile museum and event centre in Otaihanga, New Zealand. It was established by Len Southward in the 1970s to house his collection of over 450 vehicles and several aircraft and is now run by a charitable trust.

The purpose-built building includes a 6,000 square metre exhibition hall, engineering workshop, gift shop and small coffee/snack bar, all set in park-like grounds. The building also incorporates the 474-seat Southward Theatre, which features the 1929 Wurlitzer Unit Orchestra theatre organ that was originally installed in the Civic Theatre in Auckland.

== History ==
The core car collection was the personal work of Len Southward and his wife Vera. The couple began collecting cars in 1956 with a Ford Model T.

Having established the largest private car collection in Australasia, in 1976 Southward purchased a 6-hectare (15-acre) site on which to establish a museum open to the public. Ground was broken on the museum site in 1971, but construction wasn't given council consent until 1977. The museum officially opened on 22 December 1979.

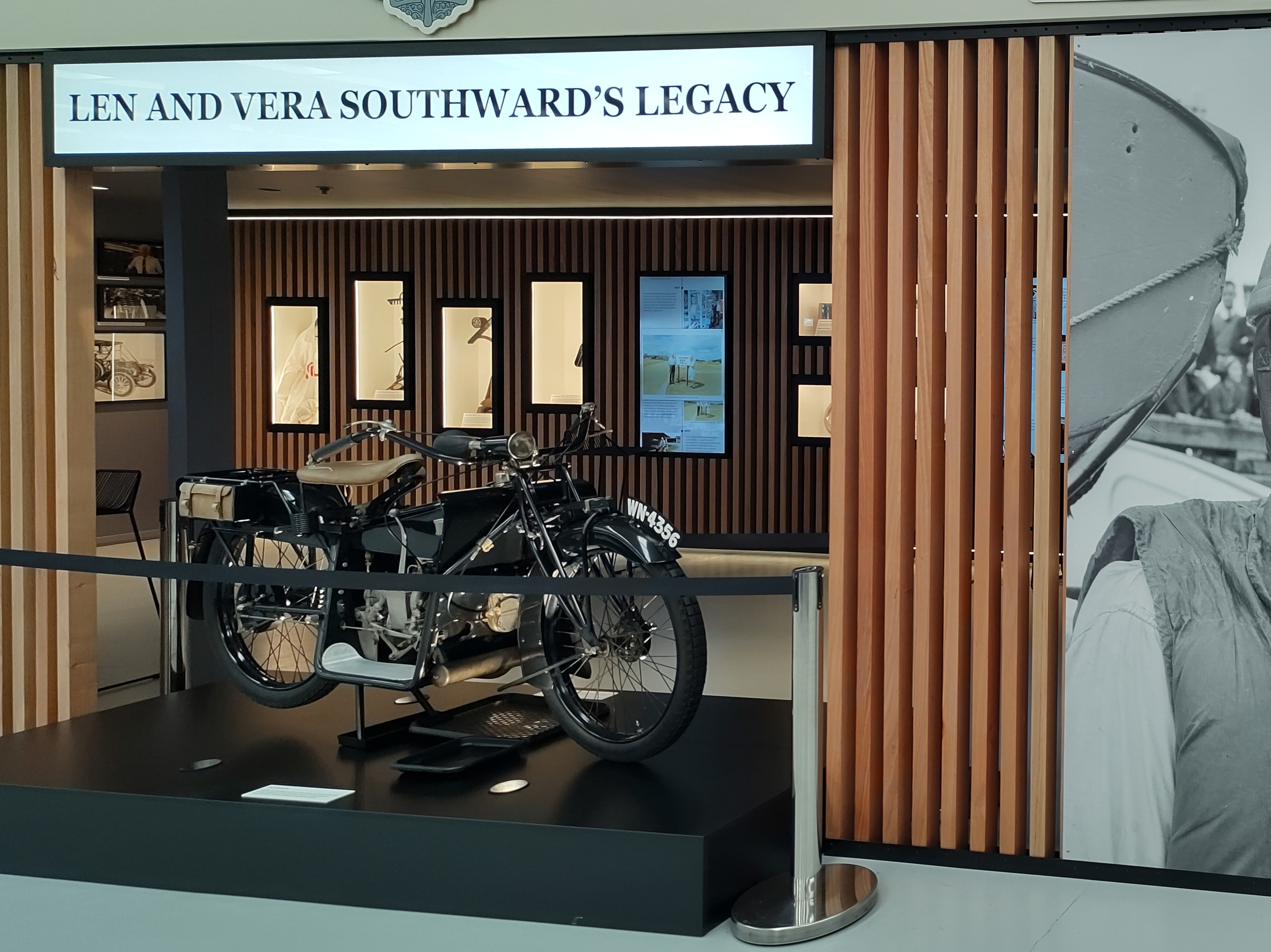
Len and Vera Southward Legacy exhibit

In 2020 a new exhibit in the museum was opened, detailing Len and Vera's lives and achievements, including new digital and material installations.

== Collection ==
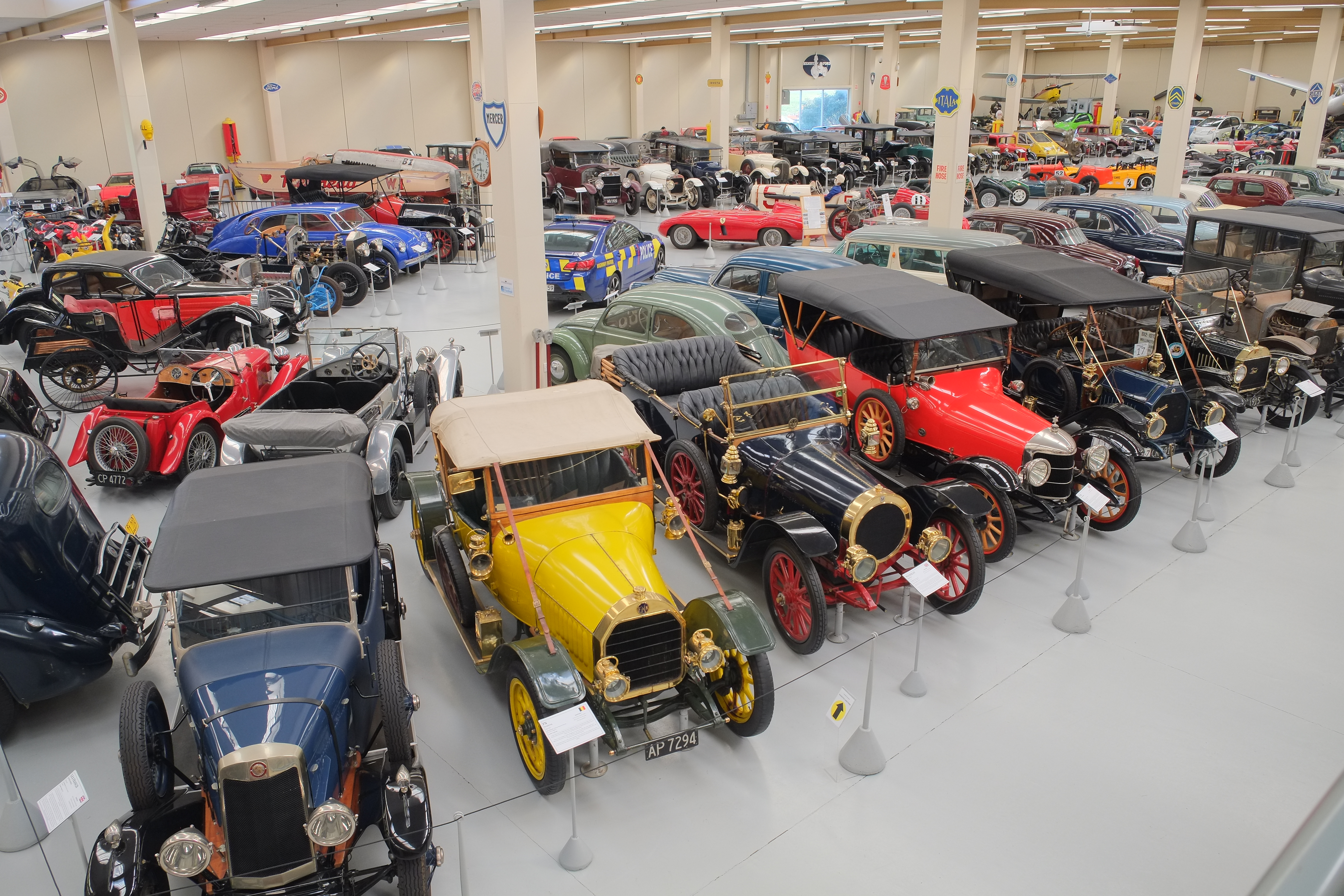
Main display hall of Southward Car Museum, New Zealand, 2023

The museum has about 450 vehicles, which include:

- 1895 Benz Velo, imported to New Zealand in 1900.
- 1915 Stutz Indianapolis race car
- Gull-winged Mercedes-Benz
- 1934 Cadillac V-16 Town Cabriolet, once owned by American actress Marlene Dietrich
- 1939 Mercedes-Benz 770, believed to have been intended as a gift for Edward VIII after the planned German invasion of Britain
- 1950 Cadillac Sixty Special "gangster special" - belonged to American gangster Mickey Cohen, fitted with armoured body panels and bulletproof plate glass 1 1/2 inches (38 mm) thick.
- DeLoreanm best known from the Back to the Future film series, the only DeLorean on public display in New Zealand.
- 2007 Subaru Impreza WRX STI rally car-p driven by Ken Block for the 2007 NZRC Season and Rally New Zealand
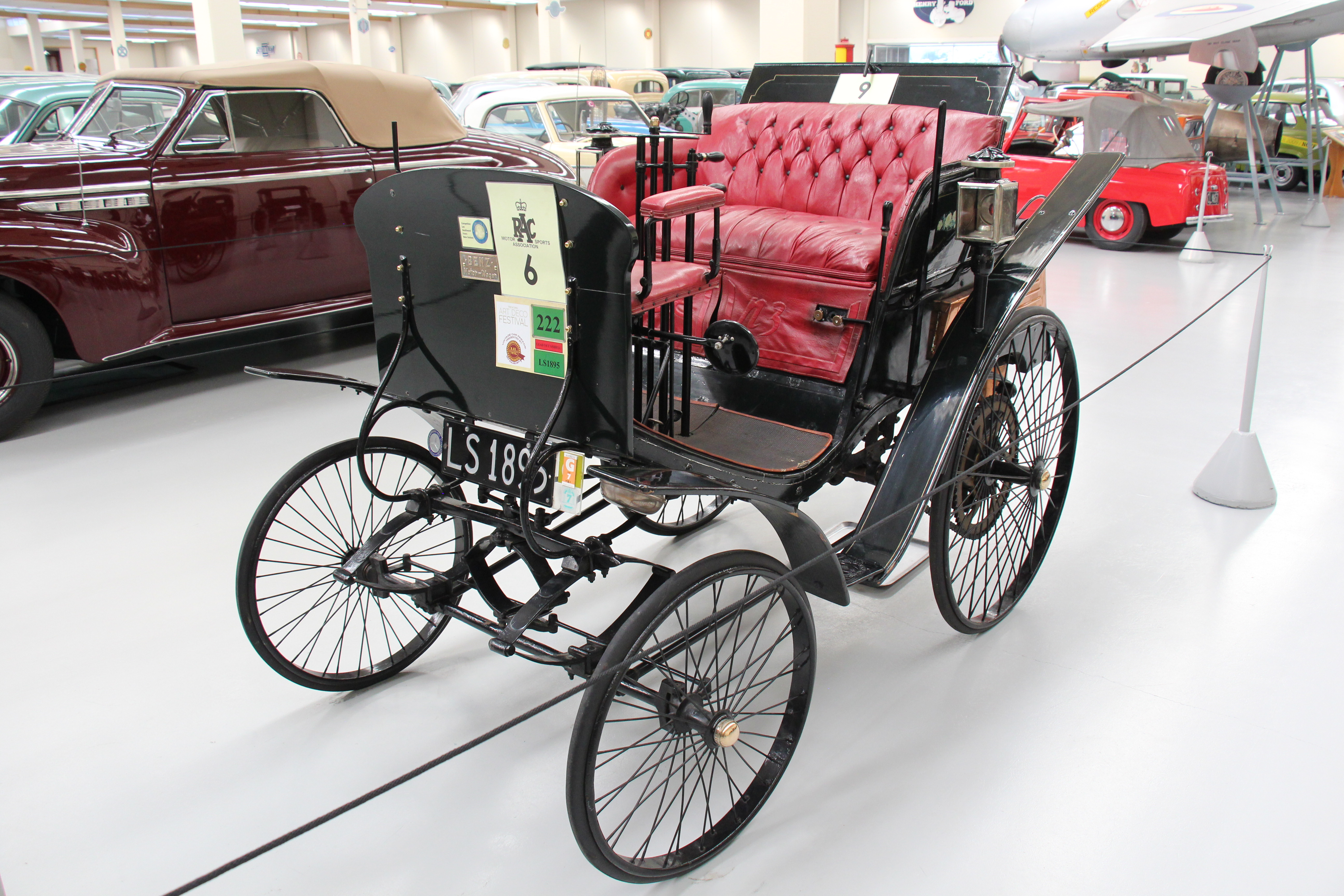
1895 Benz Velo

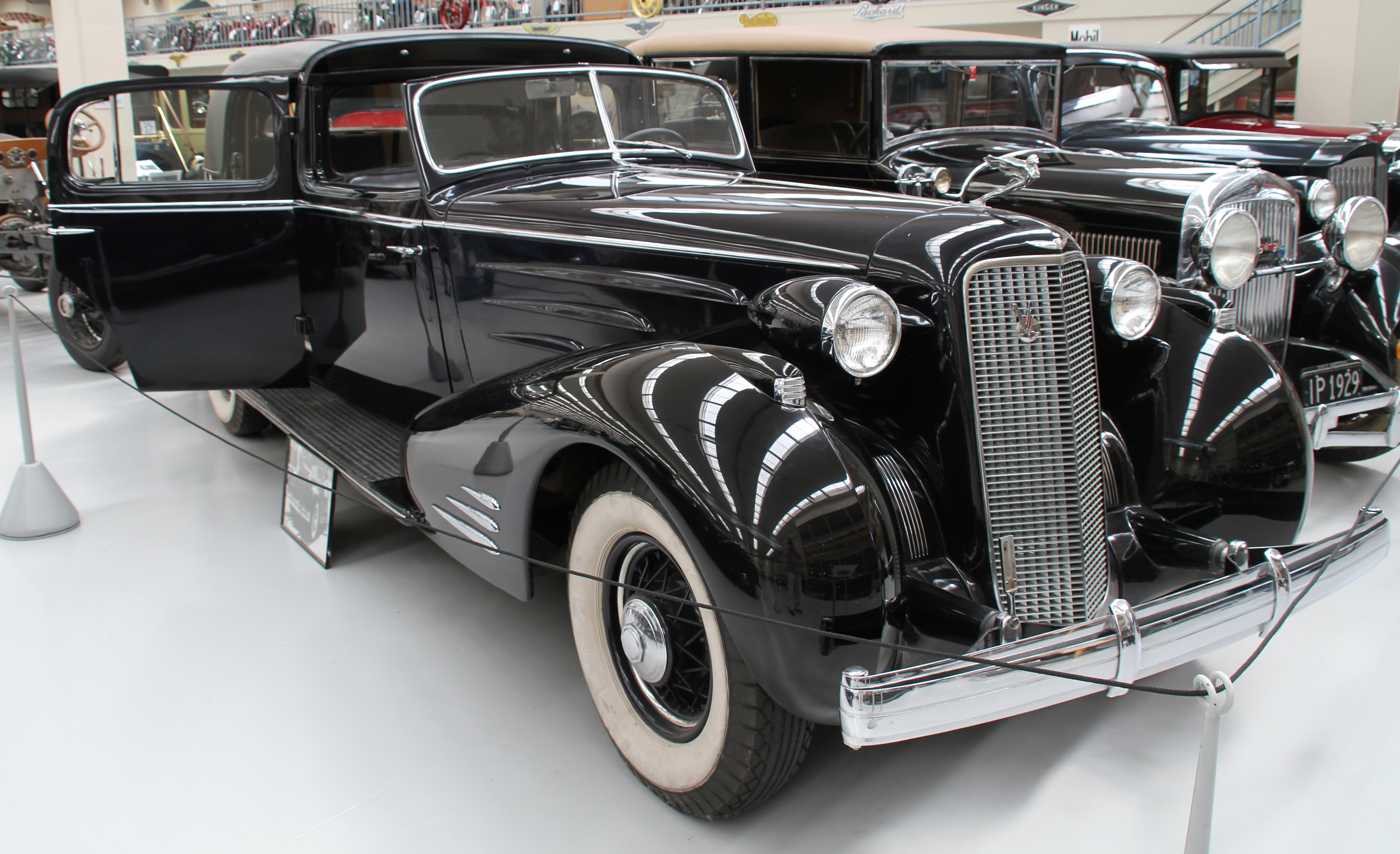
1934 Cadillac V-16 Town Cabriolet previously owned by actress Marlene Dietrich

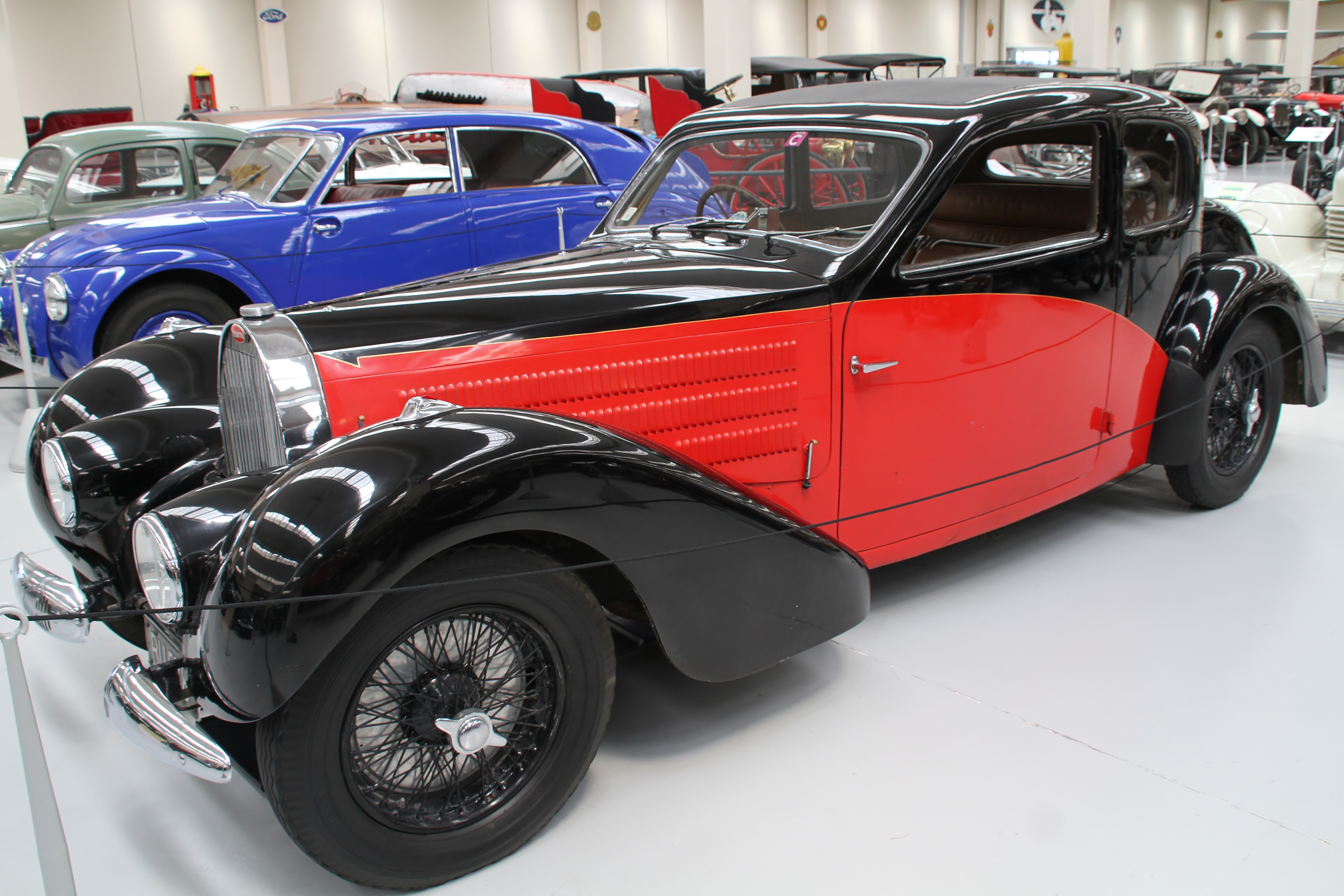
1938 Bugatti Type 57c

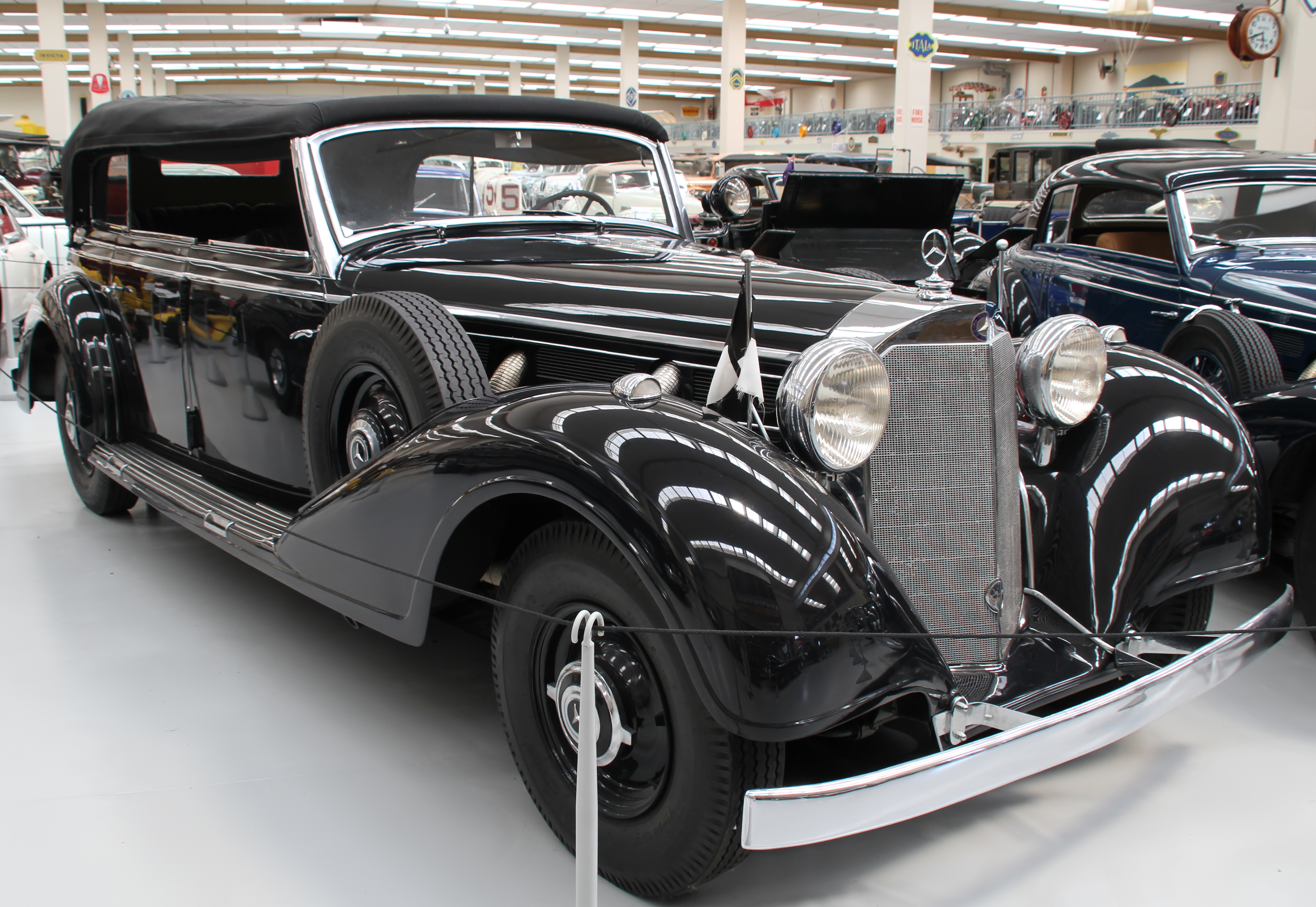
1939 Mercedes-Benz 770K

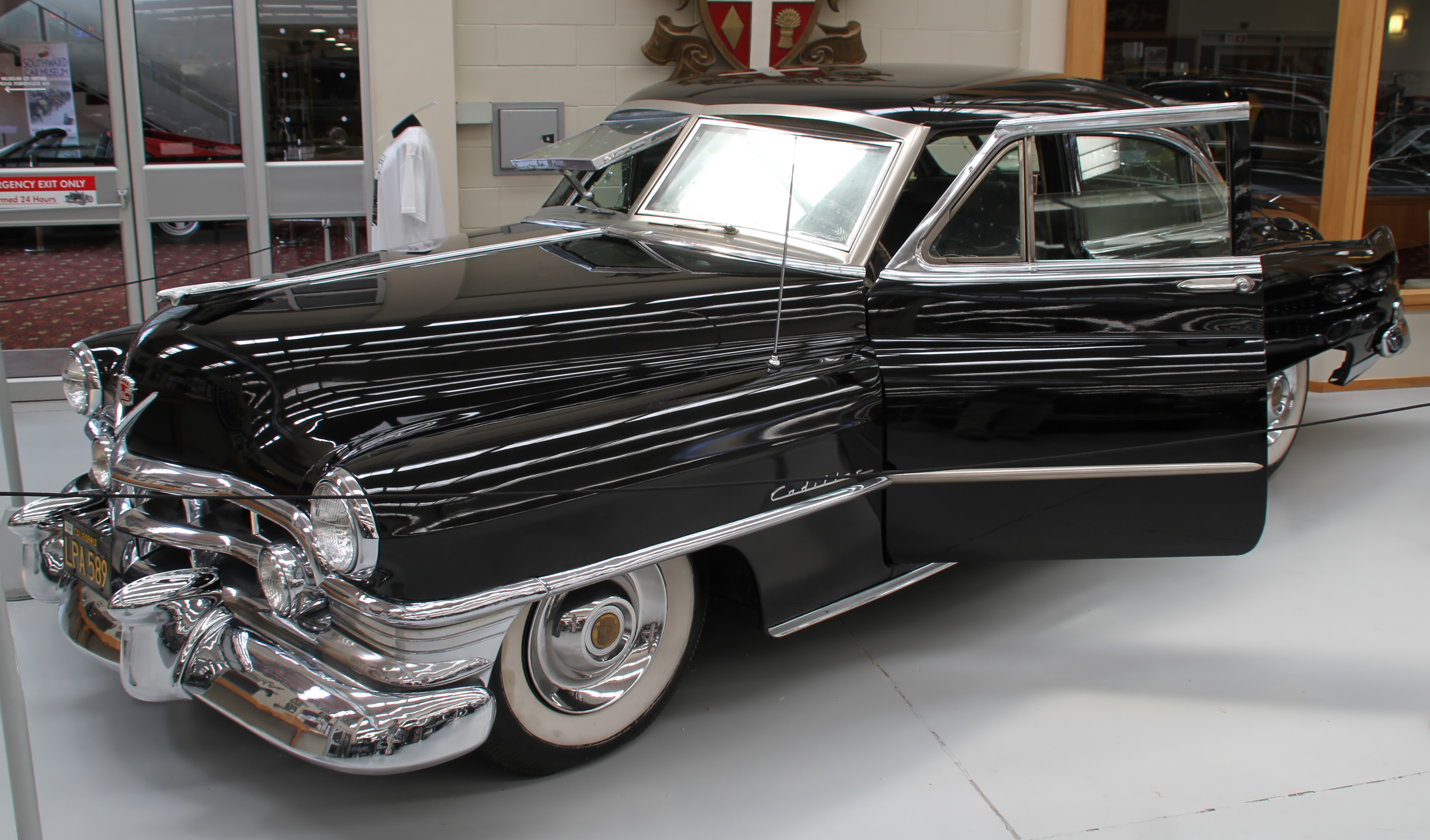
Mickey Cohen's armoured 1950 Cadillac Sixty Special

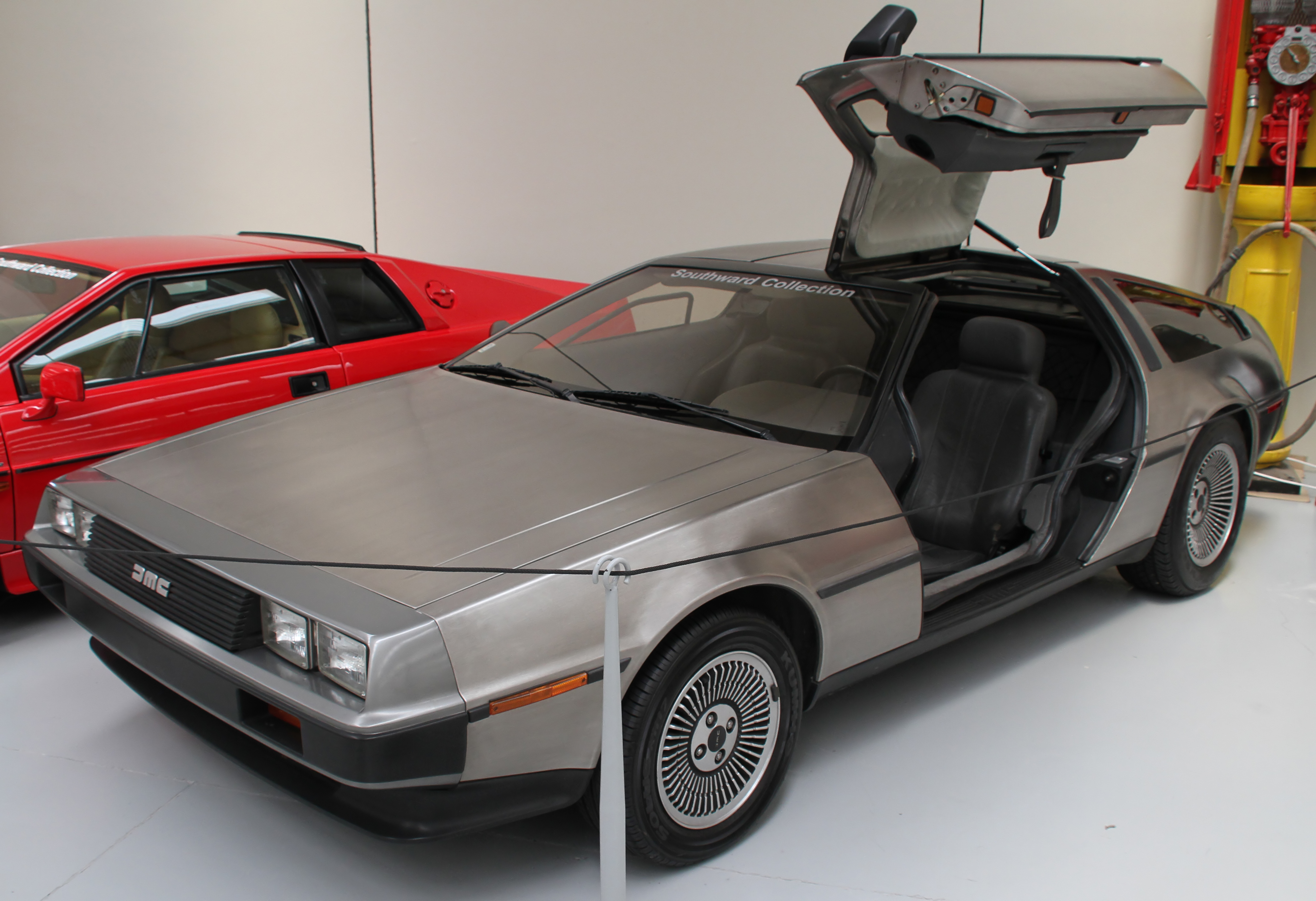
DMC DeLorean
