= Len Southward =

New Zealand engineer, businessman and car collector (1905–2004)

Sir Len Southward OBE
- Born: Leonard Bingley Southward; 20 September 1905; Wellington, New Zealand
- Died: 19 February 2004 (aged 98)
- Occupations: Engineer; businessman; vehicle collector
- Children: 2

Sir Leonard Bingley Southward OBE (20 September 1905 – 19 February 2004) was a New Zealand engineer, businessman, and vehicle collector. His collection of cars, motorcycles, speedboats and aircraft is now entrusted to the Southward Car Museum in Paraparaumu.

== Early life and family ==
Southward was born on 20 September 1905 in Wellington to English immigrant parents. His father was Philip Edmond Southward and his mother was Elizabeth Sarah née Smith. He received his education at Te Aro Primary School and aged 13, he started working. At first, he was a messenger boy.

He married his first wife, Eileen Mitchell, in 1931. They later divorced, and in 1954 he married Vera Bellamore, who survived his death in 2004 along with two sons.

== Career ==
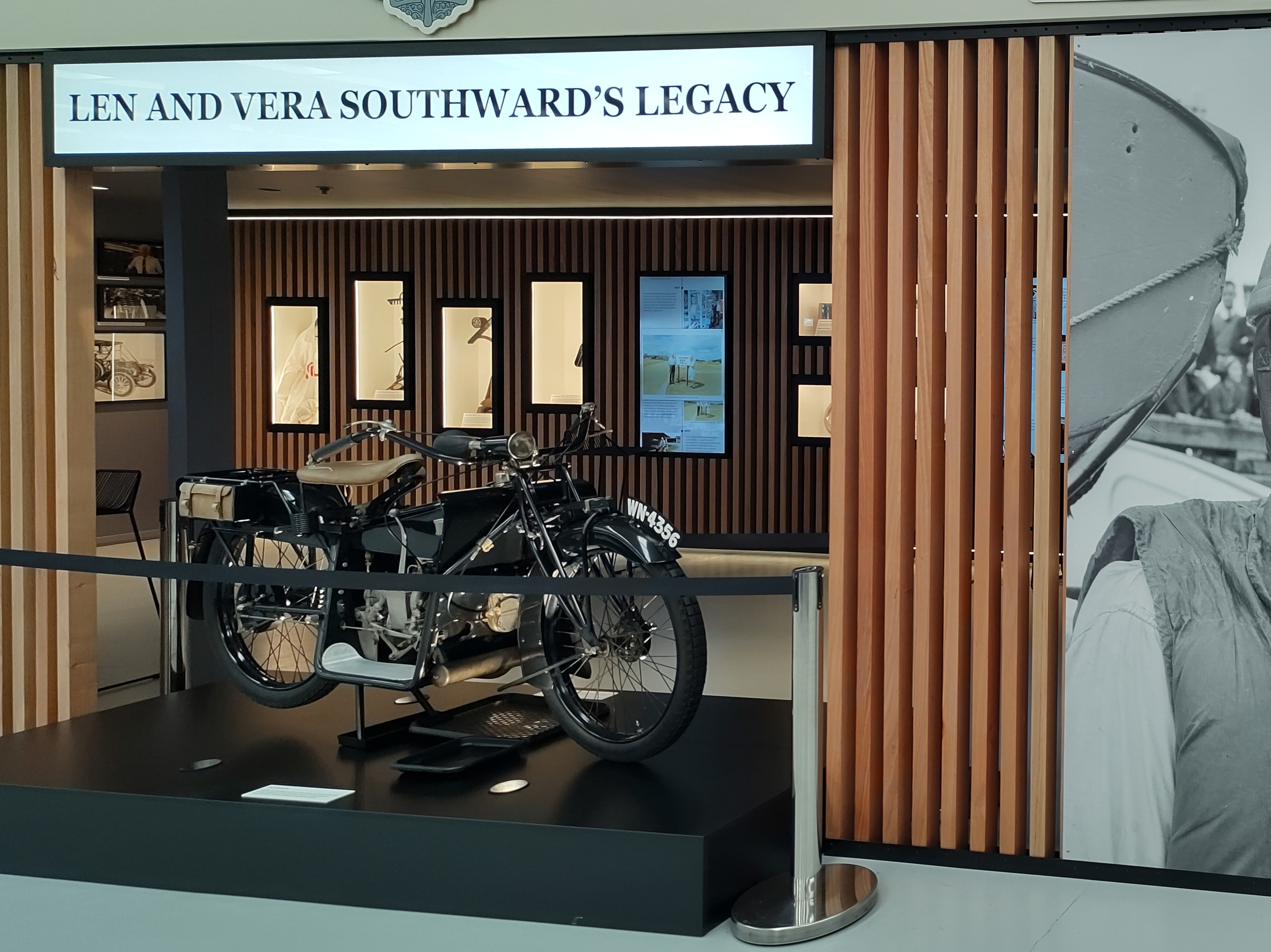
Len and Vera Southward Legacy exhibit at Southward Car Museum

Southward worked for a Wellington motor warehouse from 1919 to 1921. From 1921 to 1926, he was a motorcycle mechanic. From 1926 to 1928, he was a partner in a motorcycle repair business. From 1928 to 1939, he had his own business and from 1935, he specialised in repairing light cars. Shortages during World War II led him as an engineer to build and use his own steel tubing machinery. After the war, he built an 8-metre (26 ft) V12-powered speedboat called the "Redhead" and became well known in New Zealand for his speedboating prowess. He was the first person to exceed 100 miles per hour (160 km/h) in Australasia in 1953. Three years later, he set a new record at 109.9 miles per hour (176.8 km/h).

Southward went on to establish Southward Engineering in 1955, which developed from marine engineering into a large steel fabrication business. The company supplied automotive exhausts, racking, light-walled carbon steel and stainless steel tubing. After Southward's death, it was run by family members until being sold in 2006 to what is now Amari Metals Australia.

The Southward Car Museum had its genesis in the 1956 purchase of a Ford Model T.

== Honours ==
Southward was appointed an Officer of the Order of the British Empire (OBE) in the 1978 Queen's Birthday Honours, for services to the community. In the 1986 New Year Honours, he was knighted as a Knight Bachelor, for services in the community, especially the disabled.
