= Southbound (publisher) =

Southbound is an academic publishing house located in Penang, Malaysia. It focuses on issues relating to participatory information and communication processes in development. It was founded in 1990 by Chin Saik Yoon.

According to its website, its authors come from both the South and the North.

Southbound's books have been translated into Arabic, Indonesian, Chinese, French, Hindi, Japanese, and Spanish.
