= Dominic Michaelis =

French inventor

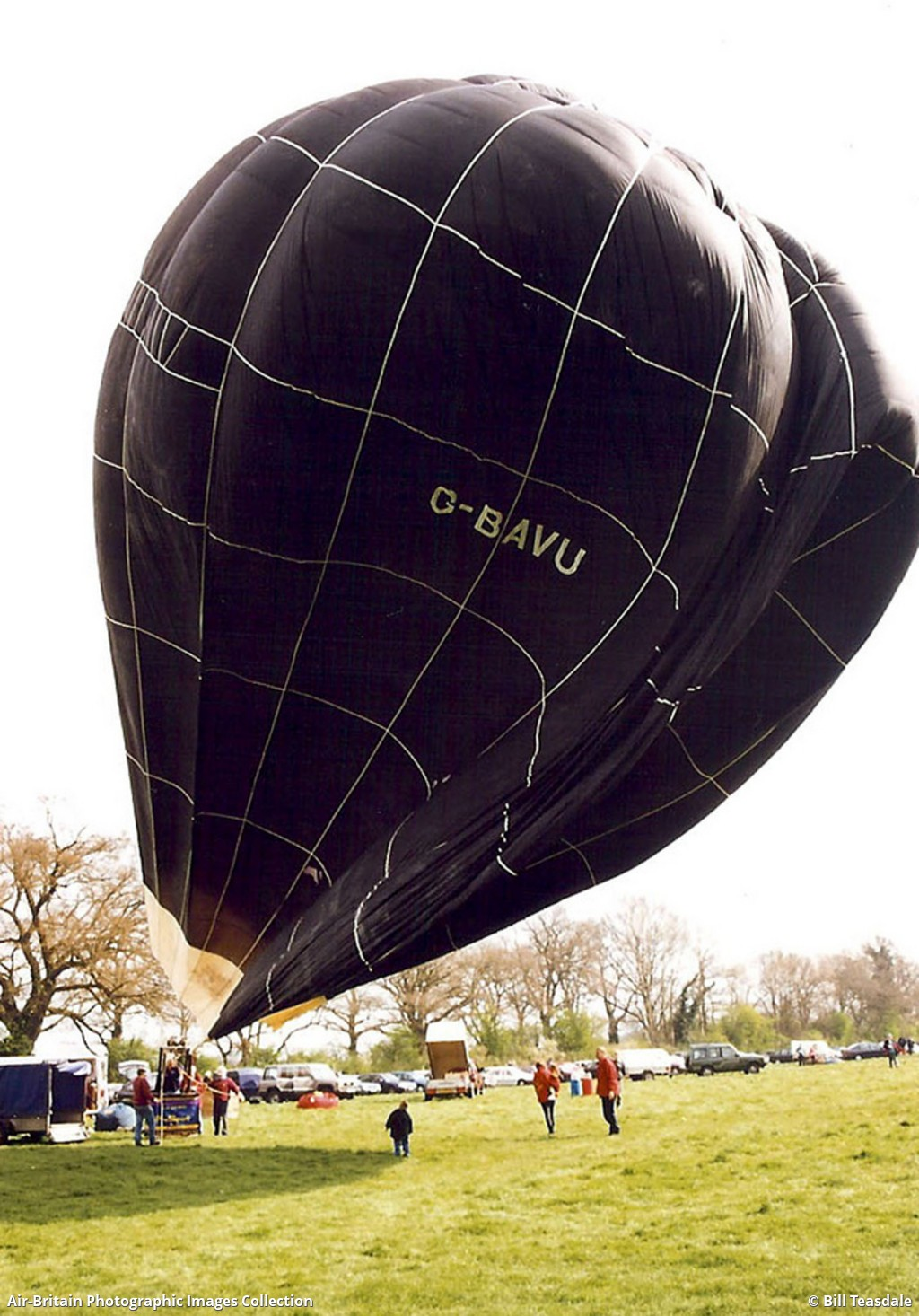
- Michaelis designed solar powered balloon G-BAVU first to cross English Channel on 1 Nov 1984
- Born: 1938; Paris, France
- Died: 22 December 2015 (aged 76–77); Cap Brun, Toulon, France
- Education: architecture & engineering
- Alma mater: Cambridge University (1964); Cornell
- Occupations: architect & inventor
- Known for: Solar energy advocate solar balloon pioneer
- Partner: Cheryll Kinsley Potter
- Children: two sons

Dominic Michaelis (1938 – 22 December 2015) was an Anglo-French architect, inventor, and solar energy advocate.

== Life as a solar energy advocate ==
Born in 1938 in Paris, Dominic Michaelis studied architecture and engineering at Cambridge. His thesis, written in 1964, was on a solar house and a floating solar village. He continued at Cornell studying for an MS in architectural structures and town planning.

In 1974 Michaelis opened a consultancy to design solar buildings, one of which received the first joint RIBA, RICS and CIBSE award. He consulted for many known solar heated or cooled projects, being responsible for some of the early solar and low energy houses in Milton Keynes. He also built many projects abroad including neighborhoods and structures, in Pisa, Rome, Marrakesh, Barbados and Mali, where he built five pise walled low cost health clinics for the EU.

== Solar balloon ==
Dominic Michaelis imagined a hot air balloon flying only by solar power. He built and tested small solar balloons with a double skin envelope. The temperature differential between the skins provided lift. His son Stéphane became the first human pilot lifted by a solar tethered balloon. In 1972, Michaelis built a 240 panel, 22 meter diameter solar balloon using polyester film and aluminum honeycomb basket. Inside the solar ballon, three vertical black screens heated through the greenhouse effect and the black screens absorbed energy through the transparent polyester film. His tethered test flights showed strong thermodynamic forces.

Inspired by US pioneer Tracy Barnes' first manned solar balloon flight on 1 May 1973, Michaelis designed a free flight solar balloon. The design included a double envelope; the internal layer black polyester, while the outer was transparent. He hired Cameron Balloons in Bristol to build solar balloon G-BAVU. The solar balloon's envelopes worked in tandem: transparent surface allowed air to flow in, enabling a greenhouse effect and absorbed the trapped solar radiation from the black envelope. The twin envelopes were attached to a basket carrying a gas burner. The burner eased inflation and aided launch with cloudy skies. Altitude control was achieved through opening or closing horizontal panels located at the balloon equator. The deflation was made possible by rip-stop panels at the balloon crowns. From 1976 to 1980, his balloon (aircraft registration number G-BAVU) participated in a number of hot air balloon festivals in England.

Julian Nott used Dominic Michaelis's solar balloon (aircraft registration number G-BAVU) to cross the English channel. On 22 August 1981, lifting off North West of Dover, he silently crossed the channel, landing at Tournehem-sur-la-Hem of the Pas-de-Calais in France. Nott used the burner once, during the landing, to arrest the descent rate. The envelope of solar balloon G-BAVU is conserved at the British Balloon Museum.

== Energy innovations ==
An idea for a wave energy converter was formulated and patented in 1980 with engineer John Field. Peter Rice a senior partner of ARUPS became interested in the project and a test was carried out at sea to validate the concept. The wave energy converter known as THE LILYPAD, is based on recovering energy from seas and oceans using flexible membranes only. It is now being developed for trials in the Mediterranean.

In 1990 Michaelis developed a low cost geodesic geometry solar cooker, which cooks at over two hundred degrees Celsius. It also boils five litres of water in twenty minutes and can therefore sterilise 100 litres of water a day.

In 2002 he patented the 'Energy Island' concept following a Call for Ideas by the International OTEC Association, a proposal for an offshore platform that would employ various techniques to generate renewable energy. His son Alex Michaelis continues his father's solar projects, and particularly the energy island idea.

Michaelis also holds patents which dispense OTEC from the cold water pipe concept, removing many environmental and economic concerns.

Dominic Michaelis died on 22 December 2015 after a long battle with illness.
