= Joseph Moore (1766–1851) =

Joseph Moore (1766–1851) was a Birmingham benefactor best known for commissioning Mendelssohn to write his most famous oratorio, Elijah (oratorio).

== Biography ==
Moore, born in 1766 at Shelsley-Beauchamp or Shelsley-Walsh, Worcestershire, was educated at Royal Grammar School Worcester. In 1781 he was sent to Birmingham to learn die-sinking and afterwards entered into a partnership in the button trade. Acquiring an independent position, he devoted his leisure to works of charity. In conjunction with Thomas Hawkes and others, he founded a dispensary for the sick poor. He came to know Matthew Boulton [q.v.], of the Soho works, who introduced him to James Watt. At Boulton's instigation, Moore formed a society for the performance of private concerts, the first of which took place in 1799 at Dee's Hotel. This society existed for several years, and developed a taste for high-class music. The festival committee now sought Moore's aid, and he planned the festival of 1799. From 1802 he virtually took the chief direction of the festivals, the profits of which went to support the General Hospital. In recognition of his services to the hospital, he was presented, on 6 April 1812, with a service of plate (Langford, Modern Birmingham, i. 394), and his portrait by Wyatt was also purchased for the hospital.

In 1808 Moore established the Birmingham Oratorio Choral Society, with the view of bringing together for practice the local singers engaged at the triennial festivals (ib. ii. 124). In order to provide the town with a building sufficiently large to do justice to the festivals, Moore successfully agitated for the erection of the town-hall (1832-4). A public subscription was raised to pay for the organ. At the festival of 1834, both hall and organ were used for the first time. To enhance the fame of the festivals, Moore went to Berlin, and induced Mendelssohn to compose, first, 'St. Paul,' which was given at the festival of 1837, and then 'Elijah' performed in 1846. The net profits arising from the festivals while under Moore's management (1802–49) amounted to 51,756 pounds.

Moore died at his house, Crescent, Birmingham, on 19 April 1851, and was buried in the Church of England cemetery there. A monument was erected to his memory by subscription.
