= Solar balloon =

Type of aerostat that gains buoyancy from air heated by the Sun

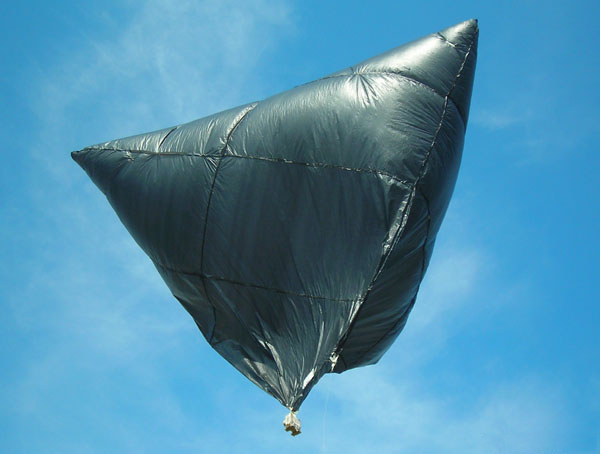
A 10-foot solar "tetroon"

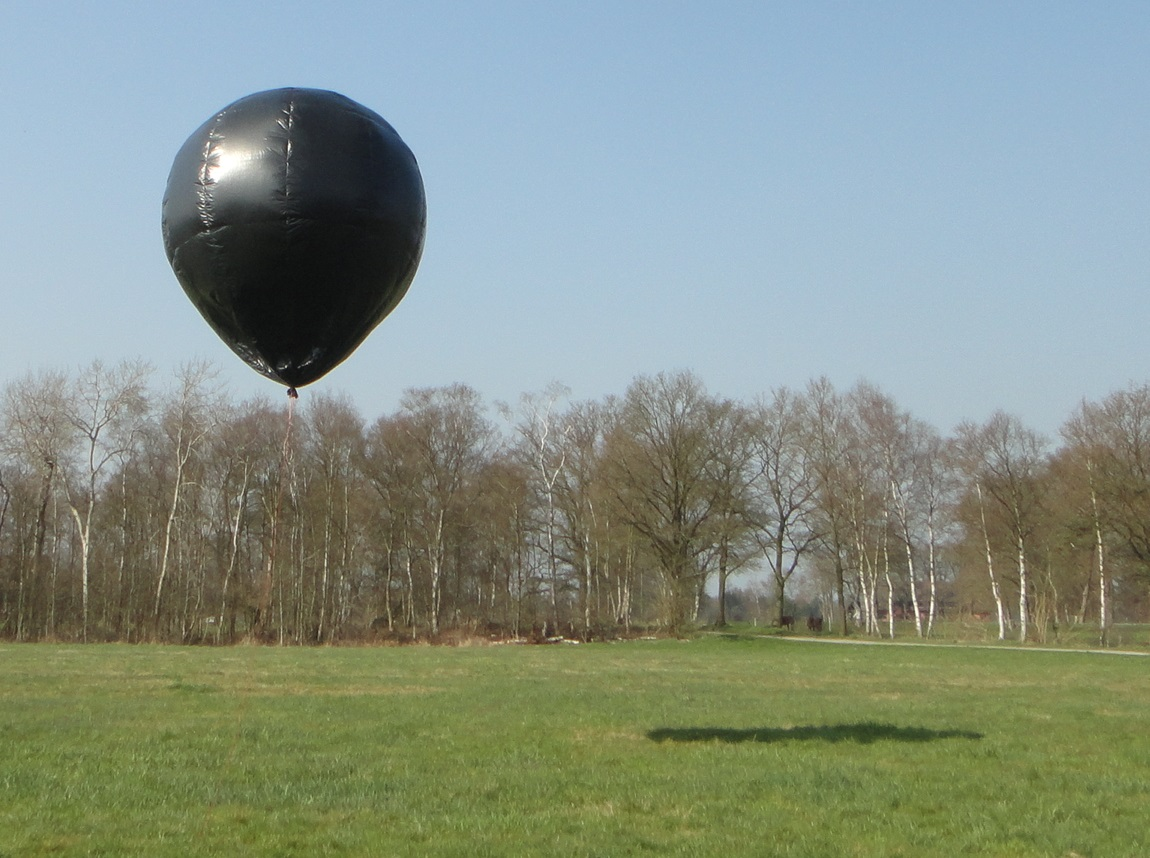
A 4 meters high solar balloon floats over a meadow.

A solar balloon is a balloon that gains buoyancy when the air inside is heated by solar radiation, usually with the help of black or dark balloon material. The heated air inside the solar balloon expands and has lower density than the surrounding air. As such, a solar balloon is similar to a hot air balloon. Usage of solar balloons is predominantly in the toy market, although it has been proposed that they be used in the investigation of planet Mars, and some solar balloons are large enough for human flight. A vent at the top can be opened to release hot air for descent and deflation.

== Theory of operation ==
=== Generating lift ===
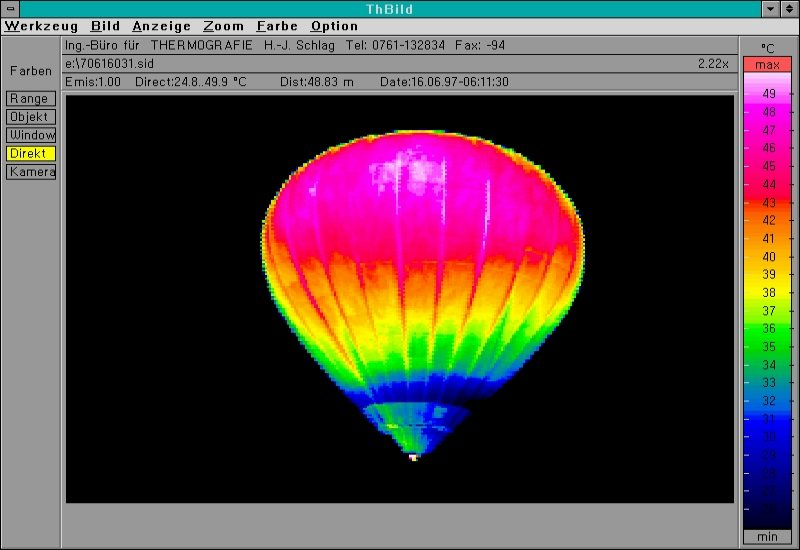
Thermal image showing temperature variation in a hot air balloon

Raising the air temperature inside the envelope makes it less dense than the surrounding (ambient) air. The balloon floats because of the buoyant force exerted on it. This force is the same force that acts on objects when they are in water and is described by Archimedes' principle. The amount of lift (or buoyancy) provided by a hot air balloon depends primarily upon the difference between the temperature of the air inside the envelope and the temperature of the air outside the envelope.

The lift generated by 100,000 ft^{3} (2831.7 m^{3}) of dry air heated to various temperatures may be calculated as follows:

air temperature	air density	air mass	lift generated
68 °F, 20 °C	1.2041 kg/m^{3}	7517 lb, 3409.7 kg	0 lbf, 0 kgf
210 °F, 99 °C	0.9486 kg/m^{3}	5922 lb, 2686.2 kg	1595 lbf, 723.5 kgf
250 °F, 120 °C	0.8978 kg/m^{3}	5606 lb, 2542.4 kg	1912 lbf, 867.3 kgf

The density of air at 20 °C, 68 °F is about 1.2 kg/m^{3}. The total lift for a balloon of 100,000 cu ft heated to (99 °C, 210 °F) would be 1595 lbf, 723.5 kgf. In reality, the air contained in the envelope is not all the same temperature, as the accompanying thermal image shows, and so these calculations are based on averages.

For typical atmospheric conditions (20 °C, 68 °F), a hot air balloon heated to (99 °C, 210 °F) requires about 3.91 m^{3} of envelope volume to lift 1 kilogram (62.5 cu ft/lb). The precise amount of lift provided depends not only upon the internal temperature mentioned above, but the external temperature, altitude above sea level, and humidity of the surrounding air. On a warm day, a balloon cannot lift as much as on a cool day, because the temperature required for launch will exceed the maximum sustainable for the envelope fabric. Also, in the lower atmosphere, the lift provided by a hot air balloon decreases about 3% for each 1,000 meters (1% per 1,000 ft) of altitude gained.

=== Solar radiation ===
Insolation is a measure of solar radiation energy received on a given surface area in a given time. It is commonly expressed as average irradiance in watts per square meter (W/m2). Direct insolation is the solar irradiance measured at a given location on Earth with a surface element perpendicular to the Sun's rays, excluding diffuse insolation (the solar radiation that is scattered or reflected by atmospheric components in the sky). Direct insolation is equal to the solar constant minus the atmospheric losses due to absorption and scattering. While the solar constant varies with the Earth-Sun distance and solar cycles, the losses depend on the time of day (length of light's path through the atmosphere depending on the Solar elevation angle), cloud cover, moisture content, and other impurities.

Over the course of a year the average solar radiation arriving at the top of the Earth's atmosphere is roughly 1,366 watts per square meter (see solar constant). The radiant power is distributed across the entire electromagnetic spectrum, although most of the power is in the visible light portion of the spectrum. The Sun's rays are attenuated as they pass through the atmosphere, thus reducing the insolation at the Earth's surface to approximately 1,000 watts per square meter for a surface perpendicular to the Sun's rays at sea level on a clear day.

A black body absorbs all the radiation that hits it. Real world objects are gray objects, with their absorption being equal to their emissivity. Black plastic might have an emissivity of around 0.95, meaning 95 percent of all radiation that hits it will be absorbed, and the remaining 5 percent reflected.

=== Estimating energy received ===
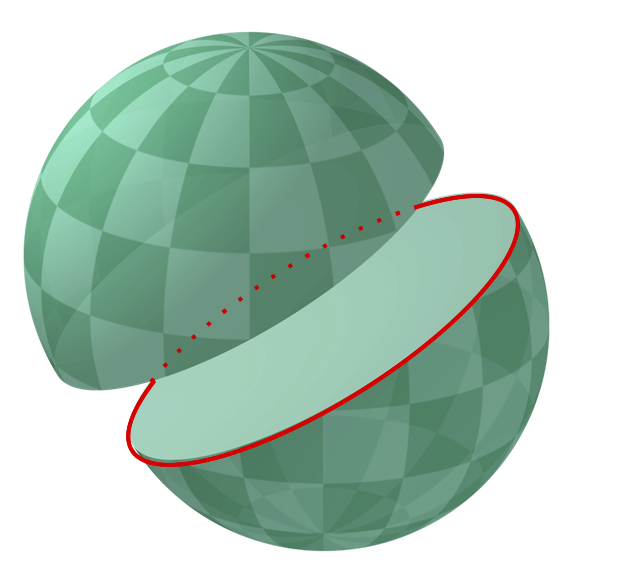
A great circle divides the sphere in two equal hemispheres

If the balloon is imagined as a sphere, the sunlight received by this sphere can be imagined as the cross-section of a cylinder with the same radius as this sphere, see diagram. The area of this circle can be calculated via:$\mathrm \pi r^2\$

For example, the energy received by a spherical, 5 metre radius, solar balloon with an envelope of black plastic on a clear day with direct insolation of 1000 W/m^{2}, can be estimated by first calculating the area of its great circle:

$$\mathrm{Area} = \pi \times (5m)^2 \approx 78{.}54m^2$$

Then multiplying this with the emissivity of the plastic and the direct insolation of the Sun:

78.54 * 0.95 * 1000 = 74,613 Watts

At sea level at 15 °C at ISA (International Standard Atmosphere), air has a density of approximately 1.22521 kg/m^{3}. The density of air decreases with higher temperatures, at the rate of around 20 grams per m^{3} per 5 K. Around 1 kilojoules of energy is needed to heat 1 kilogram of dry air by one kelvin (see heat capacity). So, to increase the temperature of 1 m^{3} of air (at sea level and at 15 °C) 5 °C requires around 5 °C * 1 kilojoules/(kilogram*kelvin) * 1.225 kilograms = 6.125 kilojoules. By doing so, you've reduced the mass of 1 m^{3} of air by around 24 grams. On a clear day with a black body surface of 1 m^{2} perpendicular to the Sun and no heat loss, this would take a little over 6 seconds.

=== Estimating rate of energy lost ===
Below is the energy balance equation of the rate of energy lost of a solar balloon when drawing the boundary line around the balloon. The Solar Balloon experiences heat transfer due to convection and heat transfer due to radiation.

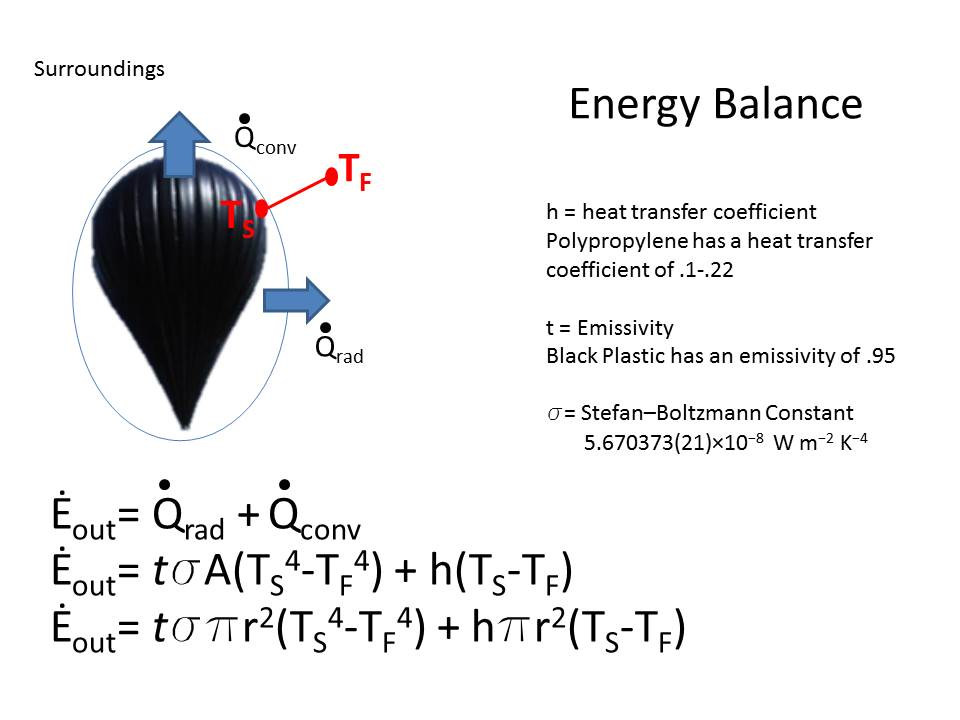
Energy Balance Equation for Solar Balloon

Ėout= tσπr^{2}(TS4-TF4) + hπr^{2}(TS-TF)

=== Estimated Change in Entropy ===
Tds=du+PdV

Δs = ∫(cv/T)dT + Rgasln(V2/V1)

Δs = cvln(T2/T1)

=== Equilibrium ===
The system is in equilibrium when the energy lost from the balloon through convection, radiation and conduction, equals the energy received through radiation from the Sun.

== History ==
In 1972, Dominic Michaelis, a British architect and the inventor of many solar utilities and projects, invented and built the first solar balloon, with a clear external surface and dark, heat-catching internal walls.

== Manned flight ==
The first human-carrying pure solar balloon flight was made on 1 May 1973 by Tracy Barnes in his balloon 'Barnes Solar Firefly Tetrahedron'. This balloon was made from a spiral tube of fabric that was formed into a tetrahedron. Dominic Michaelis is recorded as having owned the first pure solar balloon in Europe. This balloon was flown by Julian Nott across the English Channel. Records compiled for the FAI show that on 6 February 1978 Iranian Frederick Eshoo also made a solar flight in a balloon called Sunstat. This used a standard balloon design, but used clear plastic on one side, allowing the Sun's radiation to reflect off the inner surface, heating the inside air.

== First antarctic solar weather balloon flight ==
The first 100% solar weather probe, named Ballon ORA, was launched from the French Antarctic Dumont d'Urville Station in January 2011 by a joint team of students, scientists and engineers. The idea was to assess the feasibility of using solar balloons as probes in remote area, where saving the use of lifting gas, helium or hydrogen, would be precious. The flight was a success, approaching 46,000 ft (14,000 m). The savings do not only concern the lifting gas in itself. The ORA Balloon alleviates the need for the transportation, in and out, of the heavy gas canisters.

== Use in planetary exploration ==
California Institute of Technology's Jet Propulsion Laboratory has conducted a study on the use of solar balloons on several planets and moons in the Solar System, concluding they are a viable option for Mars, Jupiter and Saturn.

== Montgolfiere type ==
A variation studied, including for extraterrestrial flight like in the atmosphere of Venus, is the combination of solar balloons being additionally heated by infrared radiation from the planetary surface.

== Safety ==
Planning and airspace permission may be required by local or national airspace authorities.

Manned flights carry special risks. Unexpected clouds pose a serious risk, akin to regular hot air ballooning without reserve fuel. Solar balloons can descend rapidly when cooling occurs, making ballast very important.

== Gallery ==
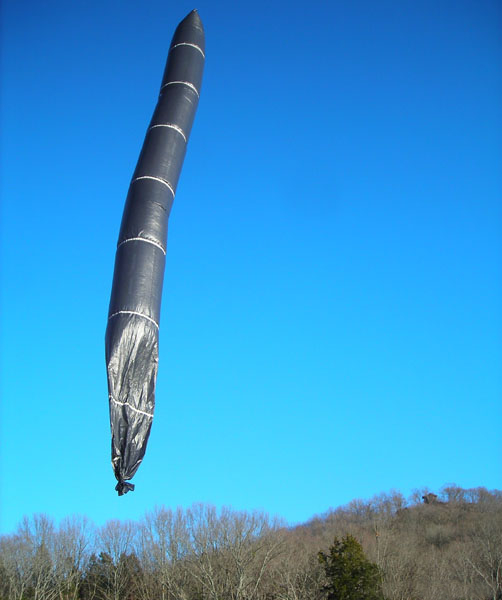
A tube-shaped solar balloon made from garbage bags

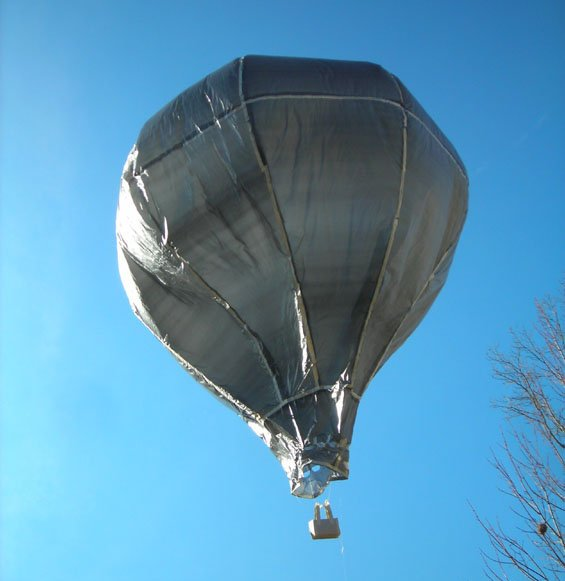

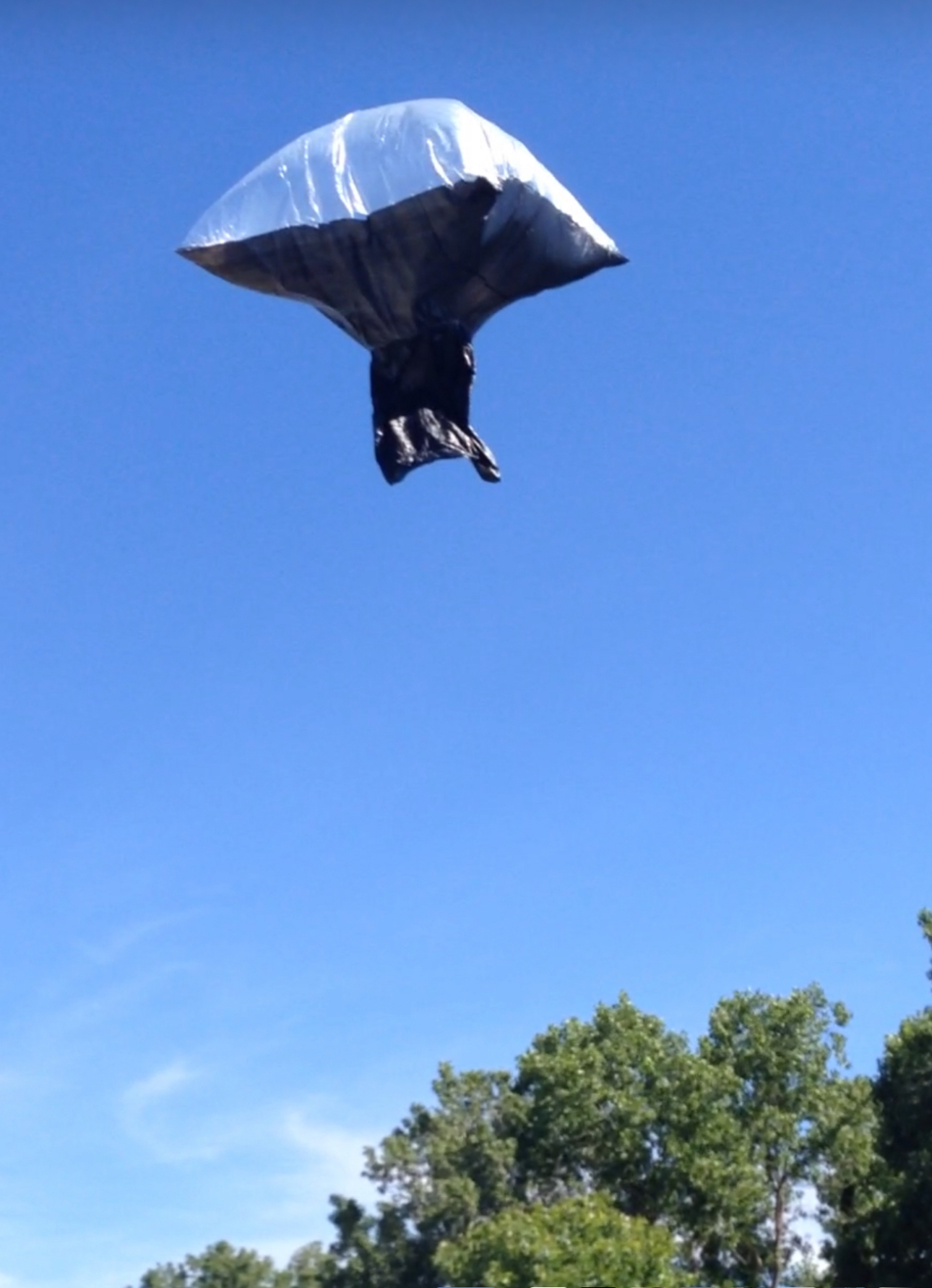
Solar thermal balloon during liftoff
