= List of Cook Strait crossings by air =

This is a list of notable first crossings of the Cook Strait by air.

== First crossings ==
Date	Crossing	Participant(s)	Aircraft	Departure point Arrival point	Notes
25 August 1920	First aeroplane	Euan Dickson, C.H. Hewlett and J.E. Moore	Avro 504K	Blenheim; Trentham	First flight across Cook Strait
28 August 1920	First aeroplane (N-S)	Euan Dickson and J.E. Moore	Avro 504K	Trentham; Blenheim	
8 May 1930	First woman	Aroha Clifford	Avro Avian	Christchurch; Wellington	
17 April 1946	First jet	Squadron Leader R M McKay	Gloster Meteor Mk III	Paraparaumu; Woodbourne, Blenheim	
28 March 1956	First helicopter	Peter Marshall	Hiller UH-12B	Paraparaumu; Blenheim	Flight took 1 hour 17 minutes.
31 October 1957	First glider	Keith Wakeman	Slingsby Skylark 2	Harewood, Christchurch, Freyberg High School, Palmerston North	Flight distance of 290 miles, in under 4 hours.
1 January 1975	First balloon	Roland Parsons and Rex Brereton	Cameron Model O-77 Westwind	Cape Jackson, Marlborough; Whitby, Porirua	
28 September 1980	First inverted	Kurt Maluschnig	Pitts S-1D		Double crossing, flying inverted from the time he crossed the North Island coastline till his return there.
21 February 1982	First microlight	Ken Asplin; Trevor Barrett; Marty Waller	Ultralight Flight Mirage; Ultralight Flight Mirage; Quicksilver MX	North Island; South Island	Formation flight. Crossing achieved as part of a longer journey travelling from Cape Reinga to Bluff.
28 September 1999	First autogyro (double crossing)	Bill Black; Terry Tiffen	2 x autogyros	Woodbourne, Blenheim; Papaparaumu	Duo made both crossings on the same day.
28 September 1999	First autogyro (double crossing)	Bill Black; Terry Tiffen	2 x autogyros	Papaparaumu; Woodbourne, Blenheim	Duo made both crossings on the same day.
2 March 2013	First paraglider	Matt Stanford	paraglider	Tory Channel, Marlborough Sounds; Cape Terawhiti, Wellington	Launched from a helicopter. Flight took 35 minutes.
1 November 2021	First electric aircraft	Gary Freedman	Pipistrel Alpha Electro	Omaka Aerodrome, Blenheim; Wellington	

== See also ==
- List of Bass Strait crossings by air
- List of Cook Strait crossings by sea
- List of English Channel crossings by air
- List of Irish Sea crossings by air
- First flight across Cook Strait
