= List of Irish Sea crossings by air =

This is a list of notable first crossings of the Irish Sea by air.

== First crossings ==
Date	Crossing	Participant(s)	Aircraft	Departure point Arrival point	Notes
22 July 1817	First balloon	Windham William Sadler	balloon	Portobello Barracks, Dublin; Holyhead, Wales	Sadler's father, James Sadler had made an unsuccessful attempt in 1812.
22 April 1912	First aeroplane	Denys Corbett Wilson	Blériot XI	Fishguard, Pembrokeshire; Crane, County Wexford	An attempt by Robert Loraine, in September 1910, failed when his Farman III biplane came down in the sea 200 ft (61 m) from the shore.
1915	First airship	Sub Lt T.W. Elmhirst + crew	SS-17 blimp	Luce Bay, Scotland; Ireland	Airship became disabled, drifted across the Irish Sea, and carried out a successful 'balloon' landing in Ireland.
5 July 1927	First female aviator	Mary, Lady Bailey	De Havilland DH.60X biplane		
9 April 1951	First helicopter	Lt Richard Beechener	Westland Dragonfly HR.1 VX600	Anthorn, Cumbria; Aldergrove, County Antrim	
3 February 1963	First glider (E-W)	Charles Ross	Slingsby Skylark 3	Portmoak, Kinross-shire; Toome, County Antrim	
27 December 1963	First glider (W-E)	Fg Offr Dmitri Zotov	EoN Olympia 2B	Ballykelly, County Londonderry; Crianlarich, Perthshire	
1 February 1970	First hot air balloon	Raymond Munro	Canada 2	Brittas Bay, County Wicklow; Ennerdale, Cumbria	Raymond Munro (1921-1994) was inducted to the Canadian Aviation Hall of Fame in 1973. Awarded the Order of Canada in 1974.
1987	First microlight	Keith Reynolds	Pegasus XL weight-shift microlight		Achieved while undertaking a circumnavigation of Great Britain.
13 May 2007	First autogyro	Norman Surplus	AutoGyro MT-03	Kirkbride, Cumbria; Larne, County Antrim	Norman Surplus went on to make the first circumnavigation of the world in an autogyro.
24 May 2025	First electric aircraft	Chad Nichols and Chris Caputo	Beta Alia CX300	Weston Airport, Dublin; Liverpool John Lennon Airport, Liverpool	Flight covered 153 nautical miles (283 kilometres) and lasted 1 hour, 18 minutes.

== See also ==
- List of Bass Strait crossings by air
- List of Cook Strait crossings by air
- List of English Channel crossings by air
