= List of Bass Strait crossings by air =

This is a list of notable first crossings of Bass Strait by air.

== First crossings ==
Date	Crossing	Participant(s)	Aircraft	Departure point Arrival point	Notes
17 December 1919	First aeroplane	Arthur Leonard Long	Boulton Paul P.9 biplane	Stanley, Tasmania; Torquay, Victoria	Long carried 50 letters, making that the first airmail sent across Bass Strait.
28 April 1928	First woman	Jessie Miller	Avro Avian	Essendon, Victoria; Launceston, Tasmania	As passenger. Aircraft was piloted by Capt W.N. Lancaster. They had previously completed a six-month long journey in the Avian, travelling from Croydon, England to Australia.
4 January 1936	First autogyro	C. Gatenby and Capt J.M. Burgess	Cierva C.30A	Victoria; Smithton, Tasmania	
2 December 1949	First jet	Plt Off Brian Goy	RAAF de Havilland Vampire	Victoria; Tasmania	
10 January 1958	First helicopter	Capt Max Holyman and Les Taylor (engineer)	Bristol Sycamore	Melbourne, Victoria; Launceston, Tasmania	Non-stop crossing. Previous helicopter crossings required refueling stops.
1 May 1981	First balloon	Phil White, Gary Geier and Arnold Himson	hydrogen balloon	Winchelsea, Victoria; Smithton, Tasmania	Collided with high-voltage powerlines when landing.

== See also ==
- List of Cook Strait crossings by air
- List of English Channel crossings by air
- List of Irish Sea crossings by air
