= Windham Sadler =

Irish balloonist (1796–1824)

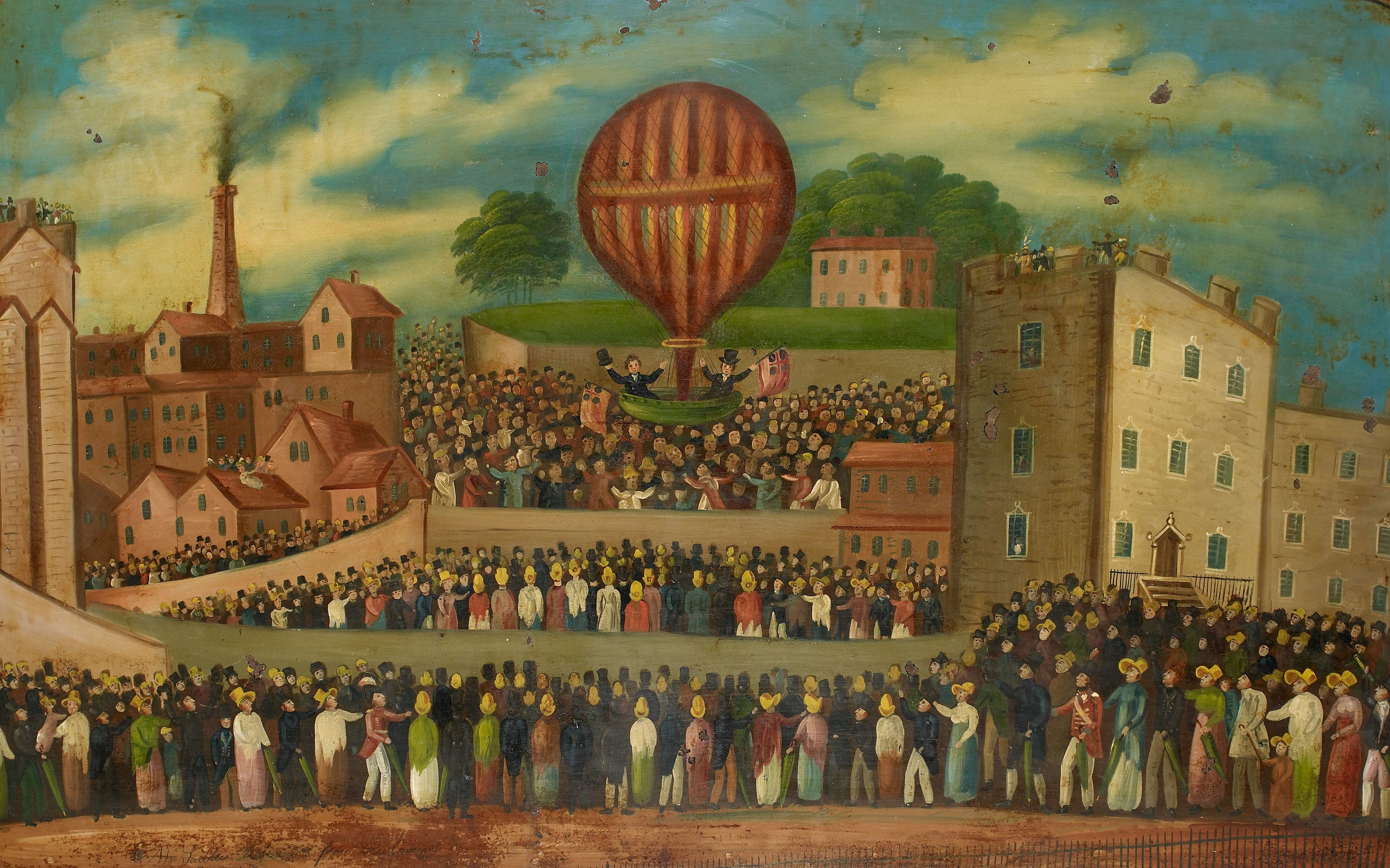
Depiction of Sadler's 1823 ascent from The Crescent, Birmingham

William Windham Sadler (17 October 1796 – 30 September 1824) was an English balloonist. His father was aviation pioneer James Sadler, and, after an education in engineering, Sadler followed in his father's footsteps. He made an ascent in London during the Grand Jubilee of 1814, and in 1817 made the first successful aerial crossing of the Irish Sea, a feat that had been unsuccessfully attempted by his father. Sadler was killed when his balloon crashed into a chimney near Blackburn during a flight in 1824.

== Early life ==
Sadler was born in Pimlico, London, (Note: An 1897 entry in the Dictionary of National Biography by Thomas Seccombe states Sadler was "born near Dublin in 1796") on 17 October 1796. He was the fourth son of James Sadler and the first from his second wife, Martha Hancock, though two of his older brothers had died in infancy. (Note: Although baptised as William Windham, Sadler was always known just by Windham. He had three older half-brothers, John (bapt. 1779), James (bapt. 1780) and Thomas (bapt. 1782) and two older half-sisters, Mary Ann (bapt. 1777) and Eliza (bapt. 1785) from James Sadler's first marriage to Mary Harper. Mary died some time between 1791 and 1795. Sadler had one surviving younger sister, Martha Maria Sybella (born 1798)) James Sadler was a pioneer in aviation, being one of the first British balloonists. James Sadler had made his first ascent in 1785 with the politician William Windham, who became godfather to Sadler's son, who was named in his honour. Windham Sadler was baptised at St George's, Hanover Square on 30 March 1797. His father made sure he received an engineer's education, with a focus on chemistry.

== First flights ==
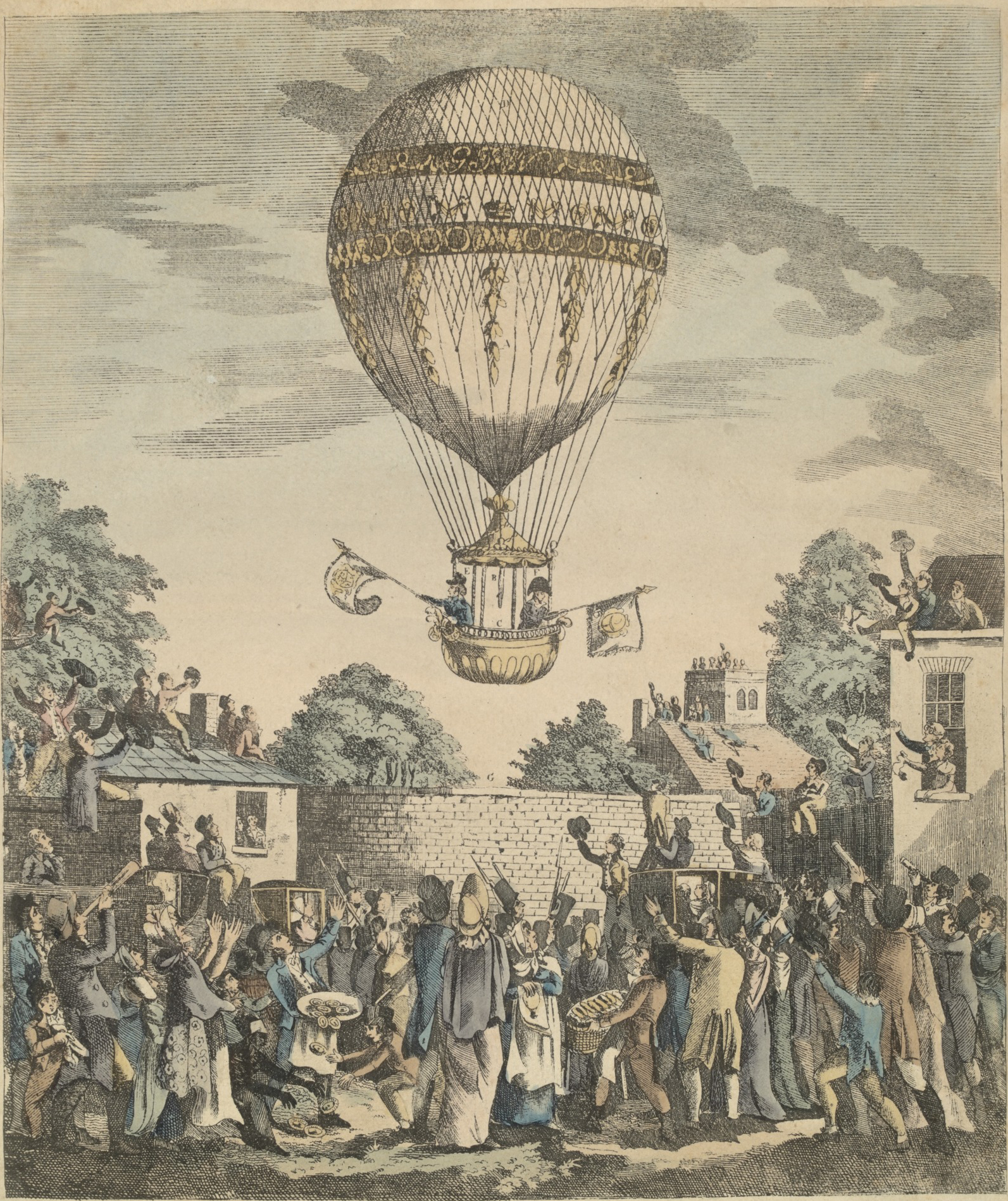
Contemporary depiction of an 1811 ascent made by James Sadler

Sadler first flew in a balloon with his father in July 1810 at Oxford. He made his first solo ascent at the age of 16 in Cheltenham on 7 September 1813 after insufficient Hydrogen gas had been generated for the balloon to carry his father. Sadler took off in windy conditions around 5:00 pm; he descended to escape a snowstorm and almost struck trees near Wychbold before he threw out enough ballast to ascend to a safe height again. He landed around an hour later at Chadlington. Historian Mark Davies, writing in 2015, notes that this flight appears to have made Windham Sadler the youngest solo balloonist up to this point. On 15 July 1814 James Sadler made what would be his final balloon ascent, from Burlington House in company with Windham, in a 75-foot (23 m) diameter balloon that they used throughout 1814. Although future ascents would often be advertised under his name, it was Windham that made them. On 29 July 1814 Sadler flew again from Burlington House, this time with actress Mary Thompson, landing in Coggeshall in Essex around 40 minutes later. The flight was commemorated in a painting at John Tatum's Theatre of Science on Fleet Street.

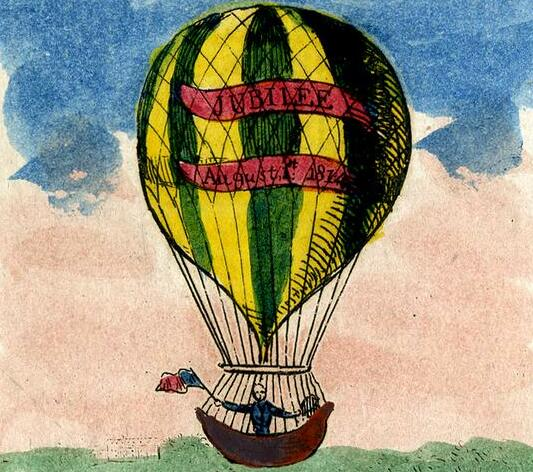
A contemporary depiction of the 1814 ascent by John Sadler

Sadler is sometimes credited with carrying out the 1 August 1814 ascent from Green Park, London, to distribute favours and programmes onto the crowd below as part of the Grand Jubilee, but this was carried out by his older half-brother John Sadler. On 24 August 1814 Sadler flew from York, landing near Craike after a 45-minute flight. On 15 September, he reunited with Mary Thompson for the first ever balloon flight made from Pontefract, landing at Tadcaster 50 minutes later. Sadler, alone, made the first balloon ascent from Doncaster on 29 September, with the flight lasting around an hour. On 22 October Sadler made the first ascent from Exeter, departing from the city's castle and landing near Sidmouth around 40 minutes later; an attempted flight from Plymouth on 24 November was abandoned after the balloon flew away (it was recovered from Dartmoor later) after it suffered damage from being blown onto iron railings.

From 1815 to 1819 Sadler lectured on ballooning at Oxford and Liverpool. On 29 July 1815 Windham Sadler flew from Norwich in a flight that had been intended for his father and Mary Thompson, in still conditions Sadler made an hour-long flight that travelled only 3 miles (4.8 km) and offered onlookers a rare chance to witness both the ascent and descent stages. He made another short solo flight of 10 miles (16 km) in around 15 minutes from Northumberland Street in Newcastle on 1 September. On 19 October Sadler flew from Glasgow Grammar school, landing in Milgavie around 30 minutes later. The landowner of the site he descended upon, wanted the balloon removed immediately, resulting in a confrontation in which both men drew knives, but which ended without bloodshed. On 3 November Sadler became the first balloonist to fly from Edinburgh since Vincenzo Lunardi in 1785 when he took off from the Old College. His departure was delayed as water, used to generate the hydrogen lift gas, had to be carried to the site by bucket. With Sadler keen to avoid drifting over the sea, a ten-minute flight was made, the brevity of which led to some complaint from observers; after the landing a crowd destroyed the balloon and basket.

Sadler flew from the New Barracks in Cork on 2 September 1816, in a 75-foot (23 m) diameter balloon, decorated with shamrocks, the Irish harp and symbols of St Patrick and carrying flags presented by Sarah, Countess of Shannon. James Sadler had intended to pilot the balloon on what would be the first flight made from Cork, but Windham stood in for him. After a flight of 20 minutes he landed near Ringabella, 14 miles (23 km) away.

== Irish Sea crossing attempts ==
James Sadler had first attempted to cross the Irish Sea in 1812 but failed, landing in the sea and being rescued by a fishing vessel. The Sadlers made another attempt on 5 November 1816 from Richmond Barracks, Dublin. It had been advertised that James would pilot the craft but in the end Windham Sadler made the ascent, accompanied by Dublin merchant Edmond D. Livingston. The balloon was blown westwards, away from the sea, for about 30 miles (48 km) and landed in the Bog of Allen around 50 minutes after its ascent.

In 1817, the Sadlers again attempted to cross the Irish Sea by balloon. Different newspaper articles in the preceding days noted that James or Windham would pilot the balloon or, if neither felt able to do so, Livingston. Various rumours circulated that Livingston had refused to make the attempt (which was refuted) or that Thompson would accompany one of the pilots. In the end Windham Sadler made the attempt alone, so he could carry the maximum load of ballast. Sadler's attempt began at 1.20 pm on 22 July with an ascent from Portobello barracks in Dublin, witnessed by 100,000 spectators. Sadler managed to find the right height to ride the prevailing westerly current towards Great Britain and had a relatively uneventful journey. He recalled seeing, at mid-crossing, the shores of both Wales and Ireland and the entirety of the Isle of Man. The balloon came in sight of the Welsh coast around 4:00 pm and Sadler successfully landed 1 mile (1.6 km) south of Holyhead around 7:00pm the same day. On arriving at Holyhead that evening he visited the harbour improvement works being carried out by the engineer John Rennie and descended several fathoms beneath the sea in a diving bell. Sadler boarded Chichster, the 1:00 am packet boat to Dublin, arriving in the city by 6:00 am. Around 2:00 pm he made a procession to Phoenix Park in the company of his father to meet Charles Whitworth, 1st Earl Whitworth, the Lord Lieutenant of Ireland.

Sadler afterwards published an account of his flight, the first successful aerial crossing of the Irish Sea, under the titles Balloon: An Authentic Narrative of the Aerial Voyage, of Mr. Sadler Across the Irish Channel and Ærostation: A Narrative of the Aerial Voyage of Mr. Windham Sadler, Across the Irish Channel. A contemporary print by engraver Robert Havell shows Sadler's balloon carrying a banner reading "Erin go bragh" (Irish: Ireland forever). As Thompson and Livingston were disappointed at missing the journey the Sadlers permitted them to ascend in their balloon on 20 August. Livingston made a safe flight of around 5 miles (8.0 km) to Marlay, during which a tortoise, wearing a parachute, was dropped by Thompson. Thompson became the first woman to ascend by balloon in Ireland.

== Gas engineer ==
On 29 August 1817 Sadler attended a meeting of the Liverpool Gas Light Company, which had been founded by James Sadler and was the first company in Liverpool to produce town gas from coal, as an informal interview for the recently vacant position of chief engineer. He was appointed engineer and manager of the Liverpool Gas Light Company on 21 September 1817, aged 20. Under his direction the Liverpool Gas Light Company grew rapidly, in January 1818 alone he brought in additional lighting business worth £500 a year, and Sadler's salary increased from an initial £100 a year to £130 in July 1819, the same month he signed the first contract to provide street lighting to the city. In 1820 he was rewarded with a rise in salary to £150.

Sadler made a flight from Liverpool in his balloon Loyalisy on 28 September 1819, accompanied by Livingston. It was reported in the Lancaster Gazette as an attempt to cross to Ireland but the intended destination may have been Manchester. Sadler and Livngston ascended just after 2:00 pm from Brownlow Hill watched by around 100,000 spectators. A thunderstorm affected the balloon and blew it across the Pennines, with Sadler claiming to have reached a height of 4 miles (6.4 km) and enduring freezing temperatures.. In danger of being blown out to the North Sea Sadler pulled a ripcord to release gas from the balloon at Norton, County Durham; nearing the ground, the balloon's anchor failed but it was eventually brought to a halt. Sadler calculated he had travelled 150 miles (240 km) in two hours and 50 minutes, in probably the fastest journey then made between Merseyside and Teesside.

Sadler married Catherine Richards, a Liverpool resident, on 27 June 1820 at St Anne's Church in the city. The couple had two children, John Muncaster Sadler (c. 1821-1912), who became a railway engineer for the Liverpool Corporation, and Catherine Windham Sadler who died in childhood. In late 1821 Sadler fell out with the Liverpool Gas Light Company's sub-treasurer, John King, when King expressed doubts in Sadler's professionalism. Sadler retaliated by accusing King of awarding contracts to parties he had interests in, though Sadler denied this. Sadler left the company on 3 June 1822, though it is not known if this vas voluntarily or under duress.

== Return to aviation ==
On 4 August Sadler acted as groundcrew for a flight by Livingston from Dunleary, in an unsuccessful attempt to cross the Irish Sea and on 9 September from Preston, attempting an unsuccessful westbound crossing. Sadler was unsuccessful in applying for the post of engineer at the rival Liverpool Oil Gas Company in October 1822.

Sadler intended to make his first ascent since 1819 and his first using town gas as a lifting gas at Leeds on 3 September 1823. By coincidence (there not having been any balloon flights in the city for 40 years prior) another balloon pilot, Charles Green, was scheduled to fly on 5 September. Green had made his application to the local gas company first so received priority for supply. Sadler therefore made his own gas on site at Leeds Cloth Hall, probably hydrogen. Windham's ascent was delayed by a day due to the weather, though the winds remained high enough to make filling the balloon difficult and Sadler had to leave behind his intended passenger and much of his equipment. The first launch failed but at the second attempt, assisted by Green, Sadler's balloon ascended, striking the Cloth Hall. Sadler landed near Market Weighton 50 minutes later. Green made his flight the following day and, though his ascent was easier, he had a rough landing during which his balloon became detached and was lost to the wind.

On 18 September Sadler made his first flight using town gas, and the first balloon ascent ever made from Sheffield. Two earlier attempts from the city had failed due to issues with the supply from the gas works and for the third attempt he used a mix of 45% hydrogen to 55% town gas. As a result of the difficulties the gas companied refused to bill Sadler for the gas used. The balloon travelled 17 miles (27 km) eastwards in 70 minutes. On 22 September Sadler flew during a storm in York, striking a building during his ascent. He had a rough landing in Kellington after a flight of 30 minutes.

On 30 September Sadler returned to Liverpool to ascend again from Brownlow Hill. The balloon struggled to ascend and collided with a nearby house before Sadler disembarked his passenger, James Donnelly, and flew on alone, reaching Warrington in less than an hour. Donnelly, a nightwatchman from Liverpool, has aspirations to become a pilot himself and Sadler took him into his employment. On 13 October Sadler ascended from the Crescent in Birmingham as part of that city's music festival. He took a paying passenger to Stourbridge in 30 minutes. On 28 October Sadler made the first balloon ascent from Derby, a city that had been unsuccessful in persuading his father to make an ascent in 1813 following a disagreement over payment. Sadler ascended to around 1.25 miles (2.01 km) before landing near Mansfield 45 minutes after his ascent. On 3 November he flew from Nottingham Castle, again intending to carry a passenger but failing to achieve the necessary lift; he landed near Lincoln.

Sadler had pushed the limits of the flying season in 1823 and as winter set in turned to a new venture, the establishment of a medicated bathing pool in Liverpool. The baths were opened in January 1824. Sadler's first flight of 1824 was on St George's Day, 23 April, from Salford; the first balloon flights from Manchester since his father's in 1785. The local town gas proved to provide insufficient lift so Sadler had to set-up his apparatus to manufacture hydrogen to supplement it. Once again his plans to take at least one passenger were scuppered; Sadler reached Kntsford in 30 minutes, suffering a head injury on landing. Sadler made the first ever balloon flight from Rochdale on 6 May, carrying B. Platt, who had been considered as a passenger for the Salford flight. They reached Bacup in 35 minutes, where the balloon was slightly damaged by a crowd of spectators.

On 27 May the second passenger from Salford, army officer Robert Haworth Peel, flew with Saddler from Liverpool. Because of Peel's weight Sadler used more hydrogen than usual in his mixture with town gas in his new balloon of 42 feet (13 m) diameter. The gas for the balloon was provided by Sadler's former employer who also set off a decoy balloon carrying a fake basket made to look like it held two passengers from their works at the same time as Sadler's launch. Sadler and Peel landed safely near Chester. It was from Chester that Sadler decided to make his next ascent, helped in his decision by the offer of free gas by the gasworks. He reached 3 miles (4.8 km) in altitude and reached Taporley.

Sadler flew from Edinburgh on 28 June carrying a passenger, Mr Campbell, with a balloon filled entirely with town gas across the Firth of Forth to Leven. The gas supplied was low buoyancy so this flight was particularly slow in its ascent and didn't reach Sadler's usual altitudes. Sadler's plans for a flight from Glasgow in early July were scuppered when the magistrates there insisted that he provide a guarantee to pay for any damage caused to the city's buildings, following a claim for alleged damage to railings during the Edinburgh flight. Sadler returned to Dublin where he made a flight on 14 July with Livingston that reached only to the coast near Skerries but had been publicised as another Irish Sea crossing attempt. On 11 August Sadler made the first balloon flight from Hull, carrying a passenger, Reece Davies (possibly an acquaintance from Liverpool), to Preston in 25 minutes. On 22 September Sadler made the first balloon flight from Wigan, at the invitation of its mayor and having been offered free gas. He flew from the gasworks, with another Liverpudlian George Armstrong, in good weather. The pair landed near to Liverpool where their arrival was greeted by a party of Sadler's friends.

== Last flight ==
Sadler's 31st and final ascent was made on 29 September 1824 at Bolton, in a balloon he had used sixteen times previously. His intended passenger was too unwell to join the flight, so Sadler asked Donnelly, then acting as his assistant, to join him. They ascended around 2:00 pm; a brisk wind quickly blew them past Blackburn, and fifteen minutes into the flight, Sadler attempted to land at nearby Church. The landing grapnel was torn away, and Sadler shouted to two men on the ground to grab hold of its rope. Striking a chimney, Sadler was jolted out of the balloon's basket and entangled in a rope by one leg. He was dragged along for 150–200 yards (140–180 m), with his head striking against several buildings before he fell a distance of 15–20 yards (14–18 m) to the ground.

The balloon, lightened by the loss of Sadler, continued for around 3 miles (4.8 km) before Donnelly brought it to the ground near Whalley, breaking his arm in the process. After he alighted to seek help, the balloon was blown quickly over the North Sea and was sighted falling into the sea by the captain of a revenue cutter around 100 miles (160 km) away off Flamborough Head, around two hours later. It was unable to be salvaged due to the heavy seas.

After his fall, Sadler was carried unconscious to a nearby pub, where he was attended by James Muir, a surgeon from Accrington. Muir diagnosed a severe fracture to the right side of Sadler's head with "the bones completely driven into the brain" and carried out a bloodletting to his right arm. A surgeon by the name of Barlow was called and carried out a trepanning. Sadler was attended overnight by his wife, who had been alerted by delivery of a letter Sadler carried on his person for such circumstances, and Armstrong. Sadler died at 8:00 am the following morning, without regaining consciousness. The coroner recorded a verdict of accidental death caused by being struck against a chimney.

Sadler's body was returned to Liverpool via Bolton and Wigan, and he was buried at the city's Christ Church on 4 October after a funeral attended by 4,000 people. Catherine Sadler was heavily pregnant at the time of her husband's death. The landlord of the pub where Sadler died also died by 1 October; at the time this was reported as from his exertions in helping to care for Sadler but was ruled by the coroner as a coincidental apoplexy. A subscription from Liverpool, Bolton, Warrington, Blackburn and Wigan among other settlements raised £1,000 within a month to assist Sadler's widow; her daughter Catherine Wyndham Sadler was baptised on 17 January 1825.

== See also ==
- List of Irish Sea crossings by air

== Bibliography ==
- Davies, Mark (2015). King of all balloons: the adventurous life of James Sadler, the first English aeronaut. Stroud, Gloucestershire: Amberley. ISBN 9781445653082.
- MacMahon, Bryan (2010). Ascend Or Die: Richard Crosbie : Pioneer of Balloon Flight. History Press Ireland. p. 197. ISBN 978-1-84588-985-2.
