= List of Cook Strait crossings by sea =

This is a list of notable crossings of the Cook Strait by sea.

== First crossings ==
Date	Crossing	Participant(s)	Craft	Departure point Arrival point	Notes
1843	First steamship		SS Clio	North Island; Picton	
23 February 1890	First canoe	George Parkes and James Parkes	2 x Rob Roy-style canoes	Mana Island; Picton	Both canoes were fitted with lug sails.
13 January 1895	First canoe (solo)	H.V. Shearman	Rob Roy-style canoe	Paremata, Porirua; Picton	Also sail-assisted. Shearman was 16 years old.
23 March 1962	First kayak	Irvin Openshaw	self-built kayak	Mākara Beach; Perano Head, Arapaoa Island	Crossing took 5 hours, 15 minutes.
17 January 1963	First waterskiers	Wayne Davidson, Gordon Hanna, and Michael Taylor	Waterskis	Mākara Beach; The Brothers Rocks	The three skiers were towed behind two boats.
24 January 1978	First windsurfers	Grant Beck, Susie Gibbs and Chris Wylie	3 x windsurfers	Cape Terawhiti; Tory Channel	Crossing was the subject of a short documentary by Sam Neill.
3 February 1978	First surf ski	Alexander McKenzie	Surf ski	North Island; South Island	While accompanying younger sister Meda McKenzie on her first swim across Cook Strait.
17 March 1981	First rower	John Argue	Skiff	Anakiwa; Petone, Lower Hutt	Total distance rowed was 90 km (56 mi).
28 March 1984	First surf ski (double crossing)	Alexander McKenzie	Surf ski	North Island; South Island	While accompanying sister Meda on her double swim across Cook Strait.
28 March 1984	First surf ski (double crossing)	Alexander McKenzie	Surf ski	South Island; North Island	While accompanying sister Meda on her double swim across Cook Strait.
12 January 1986	Smallest yacht	Gavin Brady	P-class sailing dinghy	Mana Island; Picton	Dinghy was 2.13 m (7.0 ft) long. Gavin was 12 years old, and escorted on the crossing by his parents' 13 m (43 ft) trimaran.
18 April 1987	First hovercraft	Stephen Preest	Self-built hovercraft	Picton; Plimmerton	First crossing and double crossing.
18 April 1987	First hovercraft	Stephen Preest	Self-built hovercraft	Plimmerton; Picton	First crossing and double crossing.
29 January 2008	Fastest amphibious vehicle	David McKee Wright and Brendon Hodge	Sealegs 6.1m Sport RIB	Arapaoa Island, Marlborough Sounds; Ōwhiro Bay, Wellington	Made the 40 km (25 mi) voyage in 47 minutes.
6 September 2008	First van	Adam Turnbull and Dan Melling	Roofliss	Waikawa, Marlborough; Mana, Porirua	The converted 1990 4WD Toyota Tarago van could reach speeds of 5 kn (9.3 km/h).
27 September 2012	Fastest crossing	Warren Lewis and Chris Hanley	NZ1 Skater catamaran	Wellington; Picton	Passage took 1 hour, 33 minutes. The offshore powerboat was fitted with two 525 hp (391 kW) engines.
27 March 2021	First kite foilers	Justin Groblar and Brian Walters	Kite foils	Mākara Beach; Perano Head	First crossing and double crossing.
27 March 2021	First kite foilers	Justin Groblar and Brian Walters	Kite foils	Perano Head; Mākara Beach	First crossing and double crossing.
31 March 2021	First hydrofoil bike	Hayden Reeves	Manta5 Hydrofoiler XE-1	South Island; North Island	Hybrid powered hydrofoil.
1 November 2021	First rower (double crossing)	Pam Dickson	Rowing scull	Mākara Beach; Perano Head	Dickson had previously swum Cook Strait.
1 November 2021	First rower (double crossing)	Pam Dickson	Rowing scull	Perano Head; Oteranga Bay	Dickson had previously swum Cook Strait.
16 April 2024	First prone paddleboarder	Brittany Spencer	Paddleboard	Waikawa, Marlborough; Ohau Point, Wellington	Journey took four hours, eight minutes.

== See also ==
- List of Cook Strait crossings by air
