= Aerodyne Systems Vector =

American ultralight aircraft

Vector
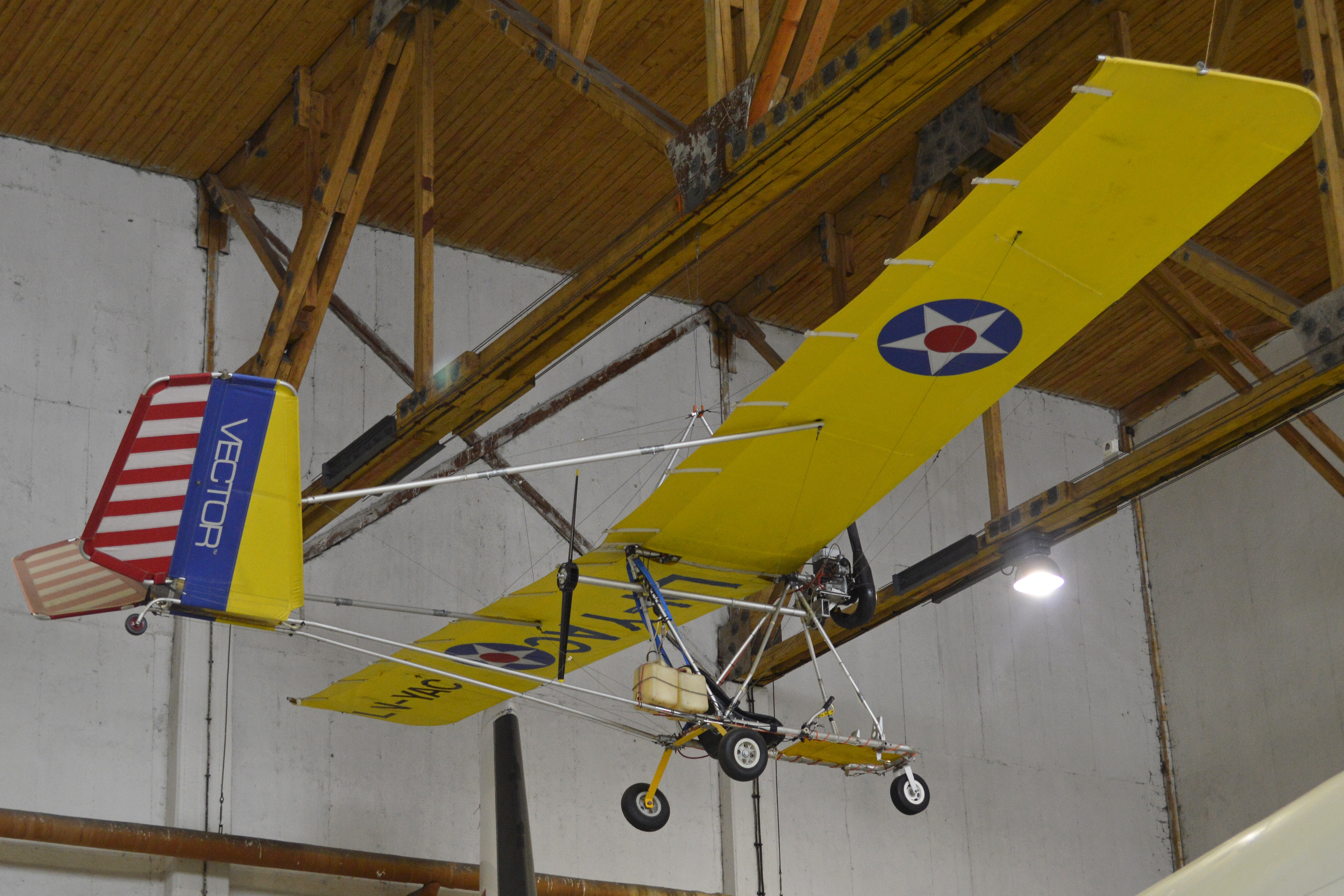
- Aerodyne Vector 610 at Flyhistorisk Museum, Sola

General information
- Type: Ultralight aircraft
- National origin: United States
- Manufacturer: Aerodyne Systems
- Status: Production completed

History
- Introduction date: 1982
- Developed from: Hill Humbug
- Variant: Ultralight Flight Mirage

The Aerodyne Systems Vector is a family of American ultralight aircraft that was designed by Berndt Petterson, Mike McCarron and Paul Yarnell and produced by Aerodyne Systems, introduced in 1982. The aircraft was supplied as a kit for amateur construction.

== Design and development ==
The Vector owes many of its design concepts to the earlier Hill Humbug and was later to inspire and influence the Ultralight Flight Mirage.

The Vector was designed to comply with the US FAR 103 Ultralight Vehicles rules, including the category's maximum empty weight of 254 lb (115 kg). The aircraft has a standard empty weight of 195 lb (88 kg). It features a cable-braced high-wing, V-tail, a single-seat, open cockpit, tricycle landing gear and a single engine in pusher configuration.

The aircraft is made from bolted-together aluminum tubing, with its flying surfaces covered in Dacron sailcloth. Its 80% double-surface 35.2 ft (10.7 m) span wing is supported by cables running from an inverted "V" kingpost. The landing gear's nose wheel is not steerable and a small tail caster is provided. The pilot is accommodated on an open seat, without a windshield. The engine is mounted at the wing's leading edge and powers the trailing edge-mounted pusher propeller through an extension shaft.

The Vector series was very popular in its day and a great number were produced.

== Variants ==
Vector 600
Initial model, with a two-axis control system, powered by two 9 hp (7 kW) Chrysler engines.
Vector 610
Improved model, with a structurally strengthened airframe, enlarged spoilers, elliptical wing tip extensions and powered by a single 22 hp (16 kW) Zenoah G-25B single cylinder, two-stroke engine.
Vector 627
Powered by a single 28 hp (21 kW) single cylinder, two-stroke Rotax 277 engine.
Vector 627 SR
Powered by a single 35 hp (26 kW) single cylinder, two-stroke Rotax 377 engine.

== Specifications (Vector 610) ==
Data from Cliche and the Virtual Ultralight Museum

General characteristics

- Crew: one
- Length: 18 ft (5.5 m)
- Wingspan: 35.2 ft (10.7 m)
- Height: 8 ft (2.4 m)
- Wing area: 154 sq ft (14.3 m^{2})
- Empty weight: 195 lb (88 kg)
- Gross weight: 445 lb (202 kg)
- Fuel capacity: 5 U.S. gallons (19 L; 4.2 imp gal)
- Powerplant: 1 × Zenoah G-25B single cylinder, two-stroke aircraft engine, 22 hp (16 kW)

Performance

- Cruise speed: 45 mph (72 km/h, 39 kn)
- Stall speed: 26 mph (42 km/h, 23 kn)
- Range: 125 mi (201 km, 109 nmi)
- g limits: +5.7/-2.8
- Rate of climb: 600 ft/min (3.0 m/s)
