= First flight across Cook Strait =

Historical Flight

First Cook Strait flight
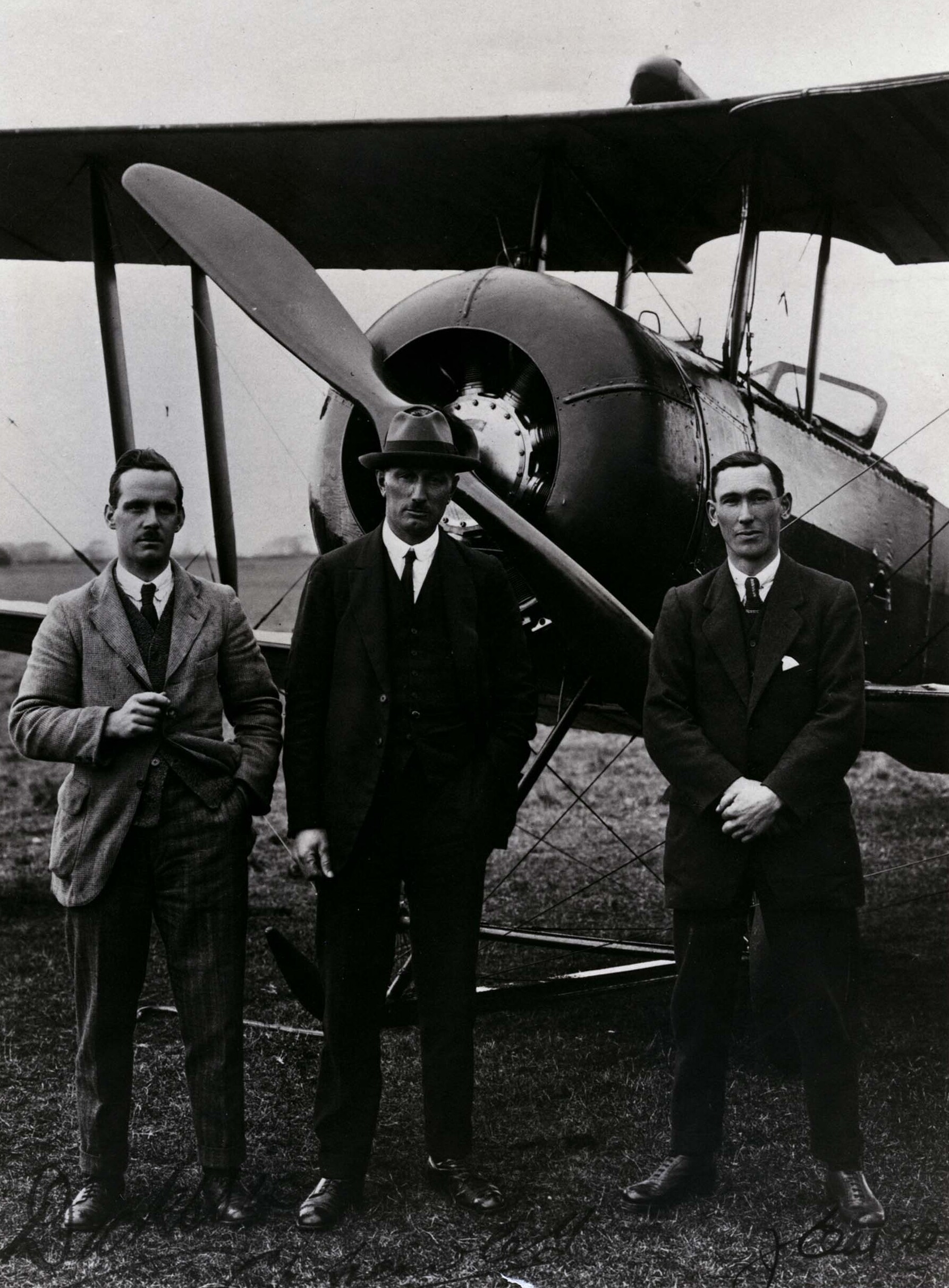
- Euan Dickson (left) C. H. Hewlett (center) J. E. Moore (right)
- Operator: Canterbury Aviation Company

Aircraft properties
- Aircraft type: Avro 504K
- Occupants: 3
- Passengers: C.H. Hewlett; J.E. Moore
- Crew: Euan Dickson

Flight timeline
- Takeoff date: 25 August 1920
- Takeoff site: Sockburn Aerodrome, Christchurch, South Island
- Landing site: Trentham Racecourse, Upper Hutt, North Island

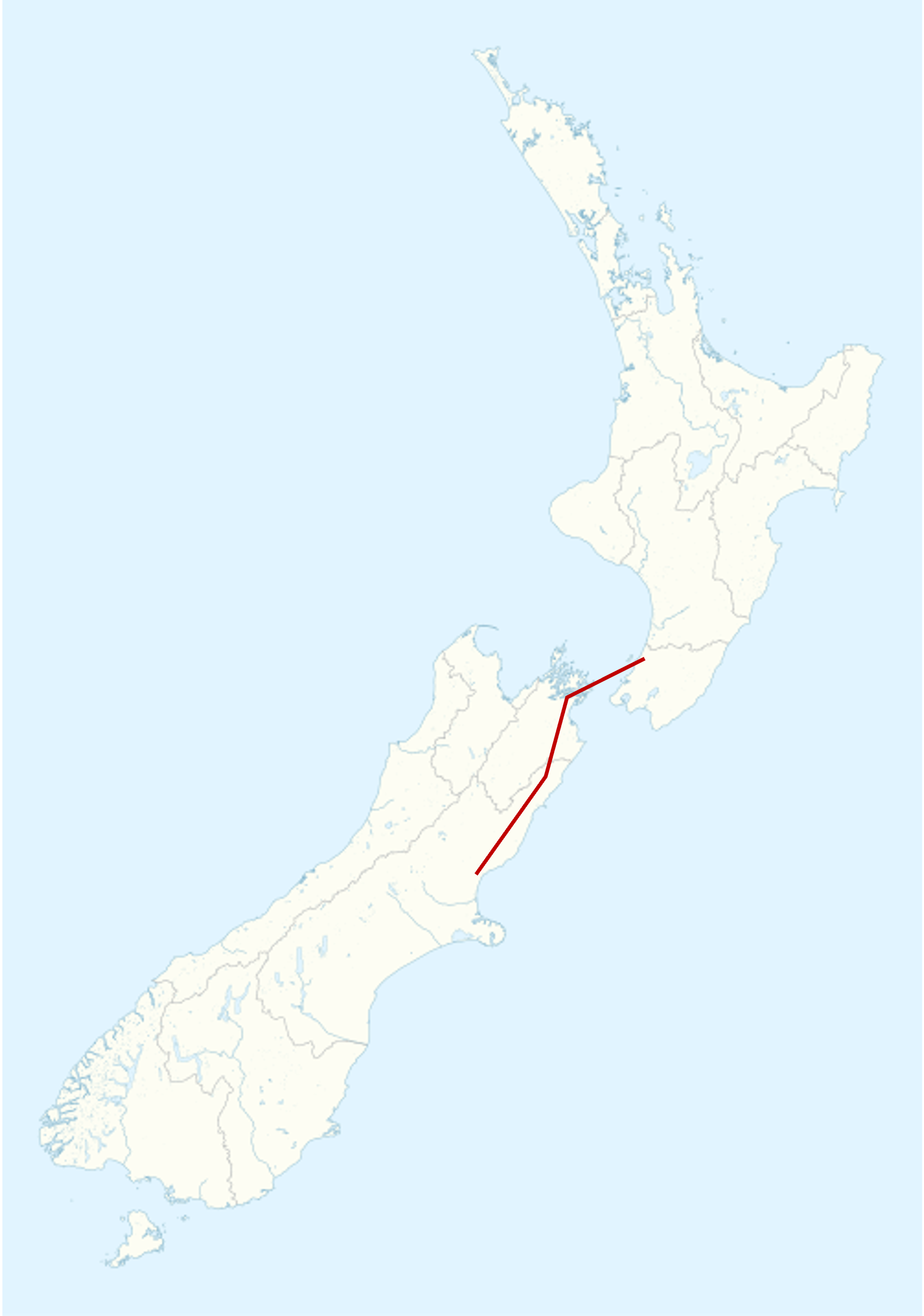
An approximate infographic of the flight path

== Background ==
The first successful flight across New Zealand’s Cook Strait was completed on 25 August 1920 by Captain Euan Dickson of the Canterbury Aviation Company, alongside C.H. Hewlett and J.E. Moore. Flying a 110‑hp Le Rhone Avro 504K, Dickson departed Sockburn Aerodrome, Christchurch at approximately 7:00 a.m. The aircraft made an unscheduled stop near Kaikōura due to strong northeasterly winds, then continued via Blenheim before crossing the Cook Strait. It landed at Trentham Racecourse in Upper Hutt around 2:10 p.m., with a total elapsed time of just over seven hours and an estimated flying time of about 4 hours and 40 minutes. Three days later, the same crew completed the first return flight from north to south. The flight carried the country’s first official inter‑island air mail and represented the first successful inter-island crossing by airplane in New Zealand.

== Planned attempts ==
Prior to 1920, the possibility of flying across Cook Strait had been discussed among pilots and aviation companies, but no successful crossing had yet been recorded. The Walsh brothers were early pioneers of aviation in New Zealand, and were among those who had reportedly planned an attempt from the North Island. However, Dickson carried out his flight without public announcement and completed the crossing, effectively beating the Walsh brothers to the milestone.

== Significance ==
The flight was the first successful crossing of New Zealand’s Cook Strait and carried the country’s first official inter-island air mail, it is also often noted in historical records of New Zealand aviation.

== See also ==
- List of Cook Strait crossings by air
