= The Crescent, Birmingham =

Former terrace in Birmingham, England

Coordinates: 52.48016°N 1.91051°W

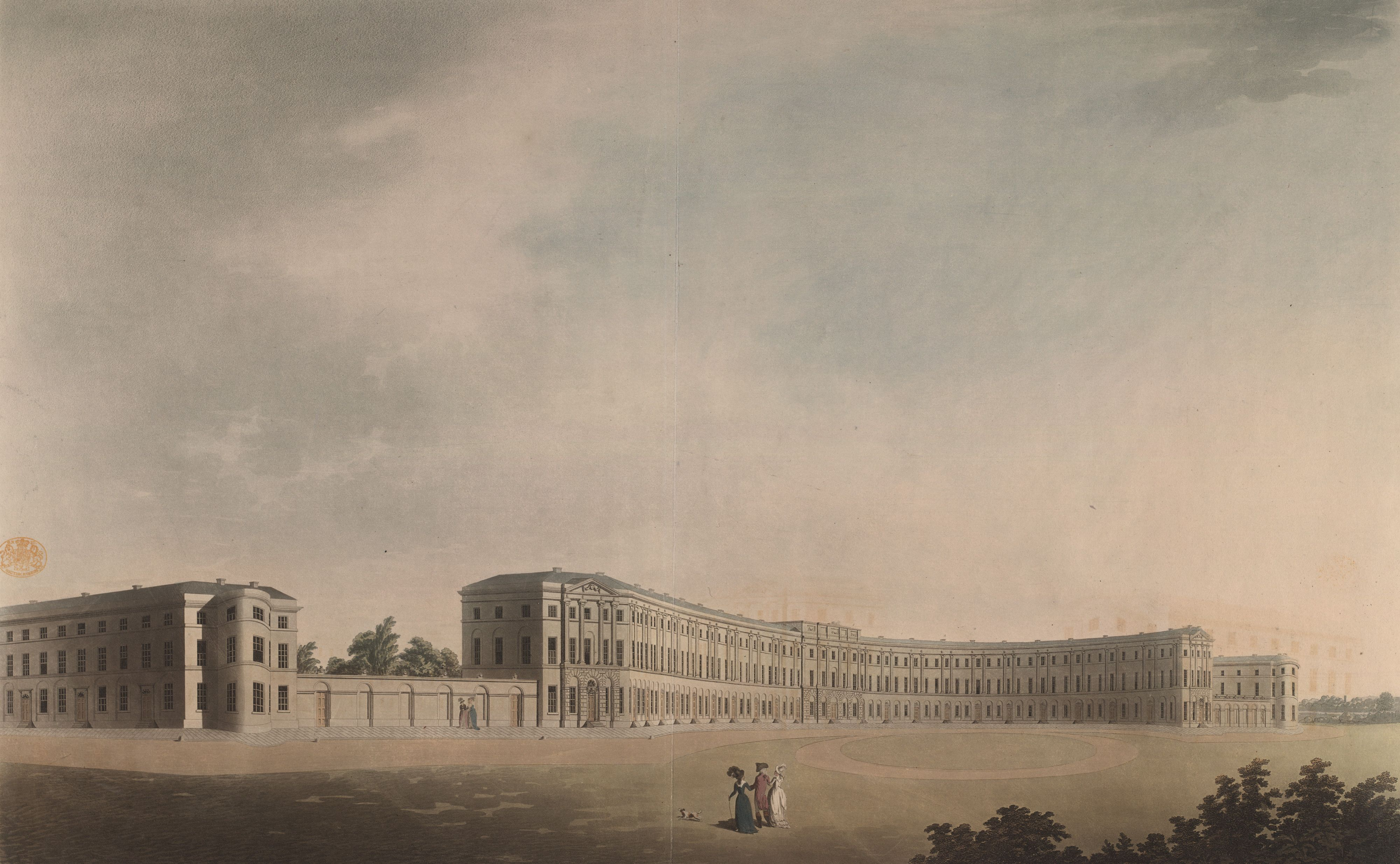
Plan of the Crescent, engraved by Francis Jukes, 1804, from the designs of John Rawsthorne

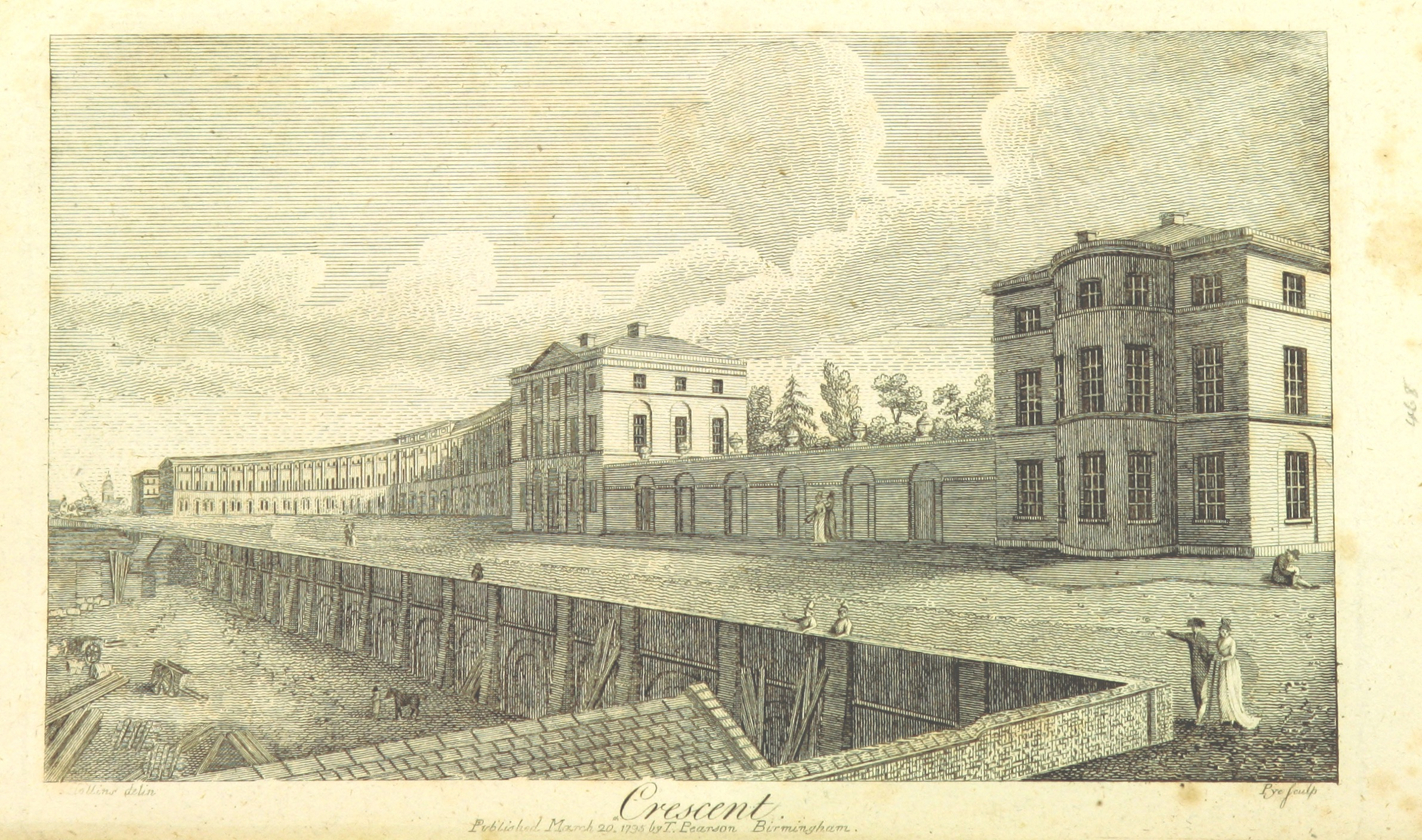
Artist's interpretation of the original design, from William Hutton's 1809 book An history of Birmingham

The Crescent was a part-completed Regency-style terrace in central Birmingham, England. The scheme was first proposed in 1788, construction started in 1795 and was discontinued the same year. The partially-completed terrace was finally demolished in the mid- to late 1960s. Like other late 18th and early 19th century crescent terraces in Britain and Ireland, it took its inspiration from The Crescent (later Royal Crescent), Bath, designed by John Wood the Younger and built 1767 to 1774.

The developer in Birmingham was Charles Norton and the architect was John Rawsthorne. The land was leased from the Foundation of the Schools of King Edward VI on a 120-year term. The 1,182-foot-long (360 m) long residential scheme was to have 34 stone-built townhouses; 23 in a central block of 622 feet (190 m), plus more in two wings (each 140 feet (43 m)), and a return to Cambridge Street (141 feet (43 m)).

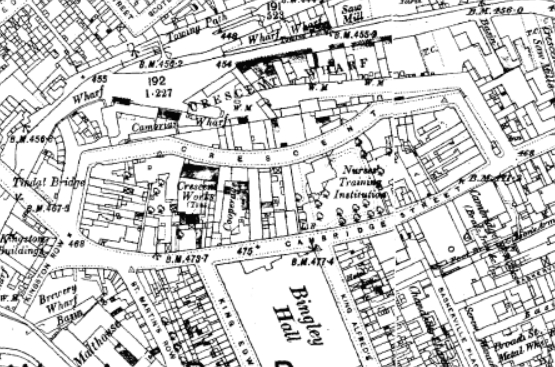
1904–1905 Ordnance Survey map showing The Crescent

Only twelve of the houses, mostly in the two wings, were built by 1795, when a building depression resulting from the war with France brought construction to a stop. Work never resumed and eventually other buildings (including a factory known as "Crescent Works") were erected on the site, in a street called "The Crescent", following the original curved layout. The Crescent ran north of, and roughly parallel to, the present Cambridge Street, the concave side facing northwards from a hilltop, overlooking the Birmingham and Fazeley Canal (completed in August 1789), and the area now known as Ladywood, which was then countryside. A later canal wharf between The Crescent and the canal was named "Crescent Wharf", and the vista became filled with factories, workshops and warehouses.

The Crescent Theatre was based in one of the buildings in the east wing of The Crescent from its first production in 1932 until 1964, and takes its name from there.

Another proposed development on the same site, the civic centre, started in the 1930s, was also abandoned due to war, when World War II broke out, with only one wing completed.

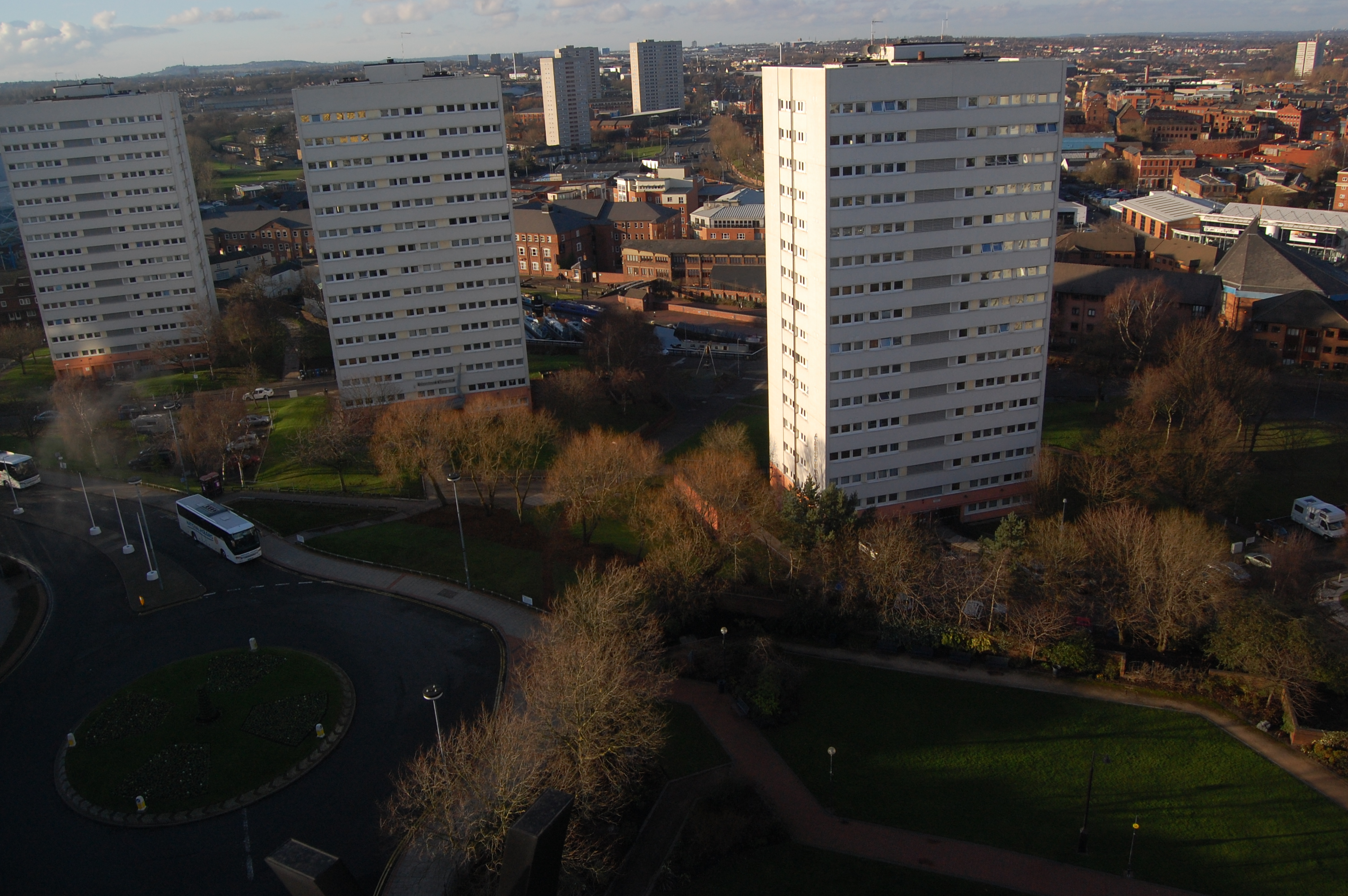
The site of The Crescent in January 2014. The sunlit tower block is Crescent Tower.

Neither the street nor any of its buildings remain. The site of The Crescent was redeveloped and is now occupied by the four tower blocks of the Civic Centre Estate, one of which is called "Crescent Tower".

== Balloon flight ==
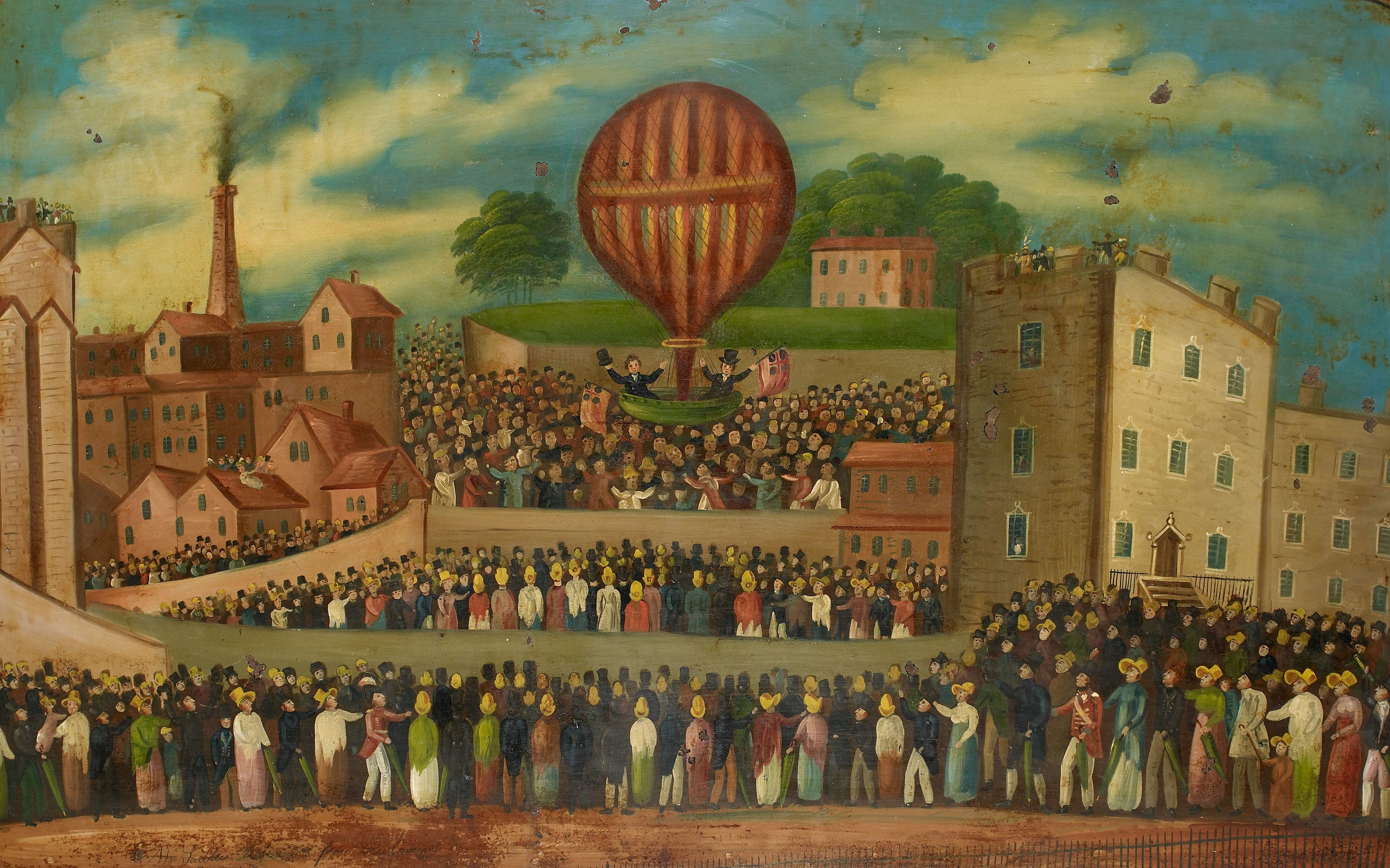
Painting from a Japanned tin tray souvenir of Sadler's balloon flight

On 13 October 1823, a hot air balloon flight was made from the Crescent, by Windham Sadler. A contemporary report describes how, at 'a quarter before 3 o'clock Mr Sadler Junior went up in a fire balloon from the Crescent accompanied by James Busby, [and it] was seen for 20 minutes, took direction of Hagley and descended safe in a field near Kinver or Enville. The balloon was up 25 minutes and went 17 mile'. Busby paid 20 Guineas (£21; equivalent to £2,161 in 2025) for his trip, and spectators paid 3s. 6d. for tickets to the launch enclosure.
