= Alex Michaelis =

English architect

Alex Michaelis (born c. 1965, Notting Hill, London) is an architect who resides in London.

He came to attention in 2005 after designing a five bedroom subterranean house for his family in Notting Hill, London. At the same time he was giving an eco-makeover to the London home of future Prime Minister, David Cameron. In 2006 he was on the judging panel for The Observer Ethical Awards.

In 2009 Michaelis began another project, buying a derelict cottage near Penzance, Cornwall. He demolished the cottage and replaced it with a £1.5 million ultra-modern four bedroom house. They rented the house to holidaymakers for up to £5000 per week.
