= Ultralight Flight Mirage =

American ultralight aircraft

Mirage

General information
- Type: Ultralight aircraft
- National origin: United States
- Manufacturer: Ultralight Flight Inc
- Designer: Frank Riley
- Status: Production completed

History
- Developed from: Aerodyne Systems Vector; Hill Humbug

The Ultralight Flight Mirage is an American ultralight aircraft that was designed by Frank Riley and produced by Ultralight Flight Inc. The aircraft was supplied as a kit for amateur construction.

== Design and development ==
The Mirage was based on the Aerodyne Systems Vector and the Hill Humbug ultralights. The aircraft was designed to comply with the US FAR 103 Ultralight Vehicles rules, including the category's maximum empty weight of 254 lb (115 kg). The aircraft has a standard empty weight of 246 lb (112 kg). It features a cable-braced high wing, a single-seat, open cockpit, tricycle landing gear and a single engine in pusher configuration.

The aircraft is made from aluminum tubing, with the flying surfaces covered in Dacron sailcloth. Its double-surfaced 32 ft (9.8 m) span wing is cable-braced from an inverted "V" kingpost and features spoilers. The pilot is accommodated on an open seat without a windshield. A fiberglass cockpit fairing was optional. The landing gear includes suspension on all three wheels and nosewheel steering. The Kawasaki TA 440A engine installation was unusual, although similar to the Humbug and the Vector. The engine is mounted at the leading edge of the wing and drives the trailing edge-mounted pusher propeller through an extension shaft. The driveshaft has proven troublesome in operational use and requires regular maintenance.

The Mirage design suffers from cracks in the aluminum wing-mounting brackets at the root tube junction and many have been changed to stainless steel fittings instead.

== Specifications (Mirage) ==
Data from Cliche and the Virtual Ultralight Museum

General characteristics

- Crew: one
- Length: 19 ft 6 in (5.94 m)
- Wingspan: 32 ft (9.8 m)
- Height: 8 ft 7 in (2.62 m)
- Wing area: 144 sq ft (13.4 m^{2})
- Empty weight: 246 lb (112 kg)
- Gross weight: 500 lb (227 kg)
- Fuel capacity: 4 U.S. gallons (15 L; 3.3 imp gal)
- Powerplant: 1 × Kawasaki TA 440A twin cylinder, two-stroke snowmobile engine, 35 hp (26 kW)

Performance

- Cruise speed: 50 mph (80 km/h, 43 kn)
- Stall speed: 25 mph (40 km/h, 22 kn)
- Range: 105 mi (169 km, 91 nmi)
- Service ceiling: 14,000 ft (4,300 m)
- g limits: +5.6/-2.8
- Maximum glide ratio: 8:1 at 26 mph (42 km/h)
- Rate of climb: 1,000 ft/min (5.1 m/s)
- Rate of sink: 430 ft/min (2.2 m/s)
- Wing loading: 3.47 lb/sq ft (16.9 kg/m^{2})
