= List of English Channel crossings by air =

This is a list of notable flights across the English Channel.

== First attempts ==
Date	Crossing	Participant(s)	Aircraft	Departure point Arrival point	Notes
7 January 1785	First crossing by air	Jean Pierre François Blanchard (France); John Jeffries (US)	balloon	Dover, England; Calais, France	—
15 June 1785	First air crash	Jean-François Pilâtre de Rozier (France); Pierre Romain (France)	Rozière balloon: combination hydrogen & hot-air balloon	Boulogne-Sur-Mer, France —	Balloon blown back over French soil and crashed, both killed.
9 September 1883	First E-W crossing	François Lhoste	Ville-de-Boulogne gas balloon	Boulogne, France; Ruckinge, Kent	Lhoste had made five previous attempts, and succeeded on the sixth.
30 September 1906	First Gordon Bennett Cup winner	Frank P. Lahm, Henry Blanchard Hersey (the United States of America)	Gas balloon	Tuileries, Paris; Fylingdales, Yorkshire	Gas balloon traveled 641 km in 22 hours and 15 minutes
25 July 1909	First person to cross the channel in a heavier-than-air aircraft	Louis Blériot (France)	Blériot XI	Calais, France; Dover, England	Encouraged by £1000 prize offered by the Daily Mail for first successful flight across the Channel. Flight time 37 minutes.
2 June 1910	First person to make a double crossing of the Channel in a heavier-than-air aircraft	Charles Stewart Rolls (UK)	Short Wright biplane	Swingfield Downs, Kent; Sangatte, France	First heavier-than-air flight from England to France.
2 June 1910	First person to make a double crossing of the Channel in a heavier-than-air aircraft	Charles Stewart Rolls (UK)	Short Wright biplane	Sangatte; Eastchurch, Kent	First heavier-than-air flight from England to France.
23 August 1910	First aircraft flight with passengers	John Moisant (US)	Blériot XI	Calais, France; Deal, England	Passengers were mechanic Albert Fileux and Moisant's cat.
4 November 1910	First airship crossing	Ernest Willows (UK) Frank Goodden (UK)	City of Cardiff airship	Wormwood Scrubs, London, England Corbehem, near Douai, France	Departed at 3:25pm on 4 November 1910. Night-time crossing, landed at 2:00am on 5 November 1910. Arrived at Paris on 28 December 1910.
16 April 1912	First woman to fly across the Channel	Harriet Quimby (US)	Blériot XI	Dover; A beach near Neufchâtel-Hardelot, France	Flight time 59 minutes. Her accomplishment did not receive much media attention, as the RMS Titanic sank the evening before.
18 September 1928	First flight across the Channel by autogyro	Juan de la Cierva (SPA)	Cierva C.8		Achieved as part of the first flight by autogyro between London and Paris.
19 June 1931	First crossing in a glider	Lissant Beardmore (UK)	RRG Professor glider	Aero-tow from Lympne to an altitude of 14,000 feet (4,300 m); Saint-Inglevert Airfield, Pas-de-Calais.	
6 September 1945	First helicopter crossing	Helmut Gerstenhauer (Germany) Flt Lt. Dennis (UK); Flt. Lt. Morris (UK)	Focke-Achgelis Fa 223	Cherbourg, France; RAF Beaulieu, England	Helicopter was piloted by Gerstenhauer, with two Royal Air Force officers acting as observers.
13 April 1963	First crossing by hot air balloon	Don Piccard & Ed Yost (US)	“Channel Champ”	Rye, England; Gravelines, France	First to cross the English Channel in a hot air balloon.
9 May 1978	First powered hang-glider to cross the Channel	David Cook (UK)	Volmer VJ-23E	Walmer, England; Calais, France	Powered by a 9 hp (6.6 kW) McCulloch 101 engine. Aircraft is on display at the Museum of Science and Industry, Manchester.
12 June 1979	First human-powered aircraft to cross the Channel	Bryan Allen (US)	Gossamer Albatross	Folkstone, England; Cap Gris Nez, France	Won a £100,000 Kremer Prize; Allen pedalled for three hours to propel the 55-pound (25 kg) aircraft
7 July 1981	First crossing by electric aircraft	Stephen Ptacek (US)	Solar Challenger	Pontoise Aerodrome, France; RAF Manston, England	Solar-powered
22 August 1981	First crossing by hybrid energy balloon	Julian Nott (UK)	G-BAVU (aircraft registration number)	North-west of Dover, England; Tournehem-sur-la-Hem, France	Solar-powered lift
August 1986	First crossing by cluster balloon	David Kirke (UK)	Balloon cluster consisted of an inflatable kangaroo and several spherical balloons.	Beachy Head, East Sussex, England; Ferques, France	Sponsored by Foster's Lager
31 July 2003	Crossing in a 20-mile (32 km) long freefall	Felix Baumgartner (Austria)	Wingsuit and a carbon fibre wing	Dover, England; Calais, France	
26 September 2008	First crossing with a jetpack	Yves Rossy (Switzerland)			Crossing completed in less than ten minutes
6 August 2009	First crossing with an electric driven aircraft with onboard energy	Gerard Thevenot			Gerard Thevenot crossed the channel with his HYNOV, an electric driven trike aircraft with hydrogen as source of energy
9 July 2015	First crossing by battery-powered electric aircraft	Hugues Duval	Colomban Cri-cri		Air-launched
9 July 2015	First battery-powered electric aircraft to takeoff and fly over the Channel	Didier Esteyne	Airbus E-Fan		
16 February 2016	First quadcopter drone to fly across the Channel in a single flight.	Richard Gill	Enduro 1	Wissant, France Shakespeare Beach, Dover	Drone launched from beach in France and flew back to UK. The total flight time was 78 minutes at an average speed of about 10 m/s. The flight was conducted with the approval of the French DGAC and British CAA.
14 June 2017	First crossing by flying car.	Bruno Vezzoli, Jérôme Dauffy	Pégase Mark II	Ambleteuse, France East Studdal, near Dover	Pegase developed by Vaylon company took off from France and flew to UK. Total flight time: 85 minutes Distance 72,5 km which 33,3 km over the channel.

== See also ==
- List of Bass Strait crossings by air
- List of Cook Strait crossings by air
- List of Irish Sea crossings by air
