= Julian Nott (balloonist) =

American balloonist (1944–2019)

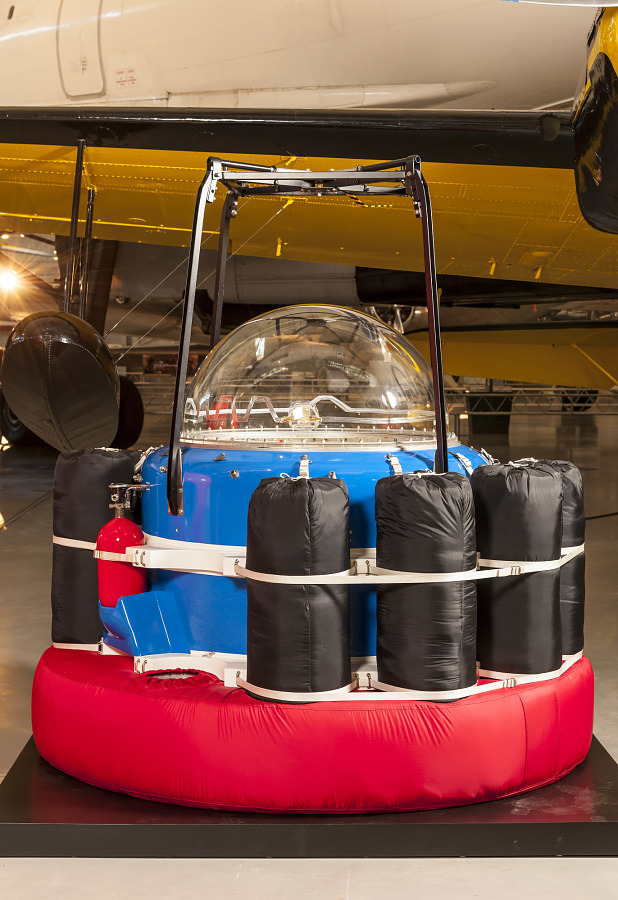
- ICI Innovation balloon gondola set altitude record of 55,134 feet from Longmont, Colorado in 1979.
- Born: Julian Richard Nott; June 22, 1944; Bristol, UK
- Died: March 25, 2019 (aged 74); Escondido, California, US
- Cause of death: Balloon accident
- Resting place: Compton Village Cemetery, Surrey, England
- Education: Physical Chemistry
- Alma mater: Epsom College; St John's College, Oxford
- Occupations: balloonist and innovator
- Known for: Altitude record of 55,134' in first pressurized hot-air balloon gondola
- Partner: Anne Luther
- Awards: Gold Medal by the Royal Aero Club, the first ever given to a balloonist

Julian Richard Nott (22 June 1944 – 26 March 2019) was a British balloonist who later lived in Santa Barbara, California. He was known for his record-setting achievements. Nott set 79 world ballooning records and 96 British aviation records. He developed balloons for flights to Solar System destinations, particularly Titan. He flew a working prototype Titan balloon at −175 °C (−283.0 °F), approximately the temperature of Titan's atmosphere.

== Early life and education ==
Nott was born in Bristol, UK, on 22 June 1944 and attended Epsom College and St John's College, Oxford. He earned a master's in Physical Chemistry. After graduation Nott worked in Bangladesh with the Voluntary Service Overseas (VSO).

== Career ==
In 1972, Nott piloted the first hot air balloon crossing of the Sahara. In 1973, he traversed the Alps in a helium gas balloon.

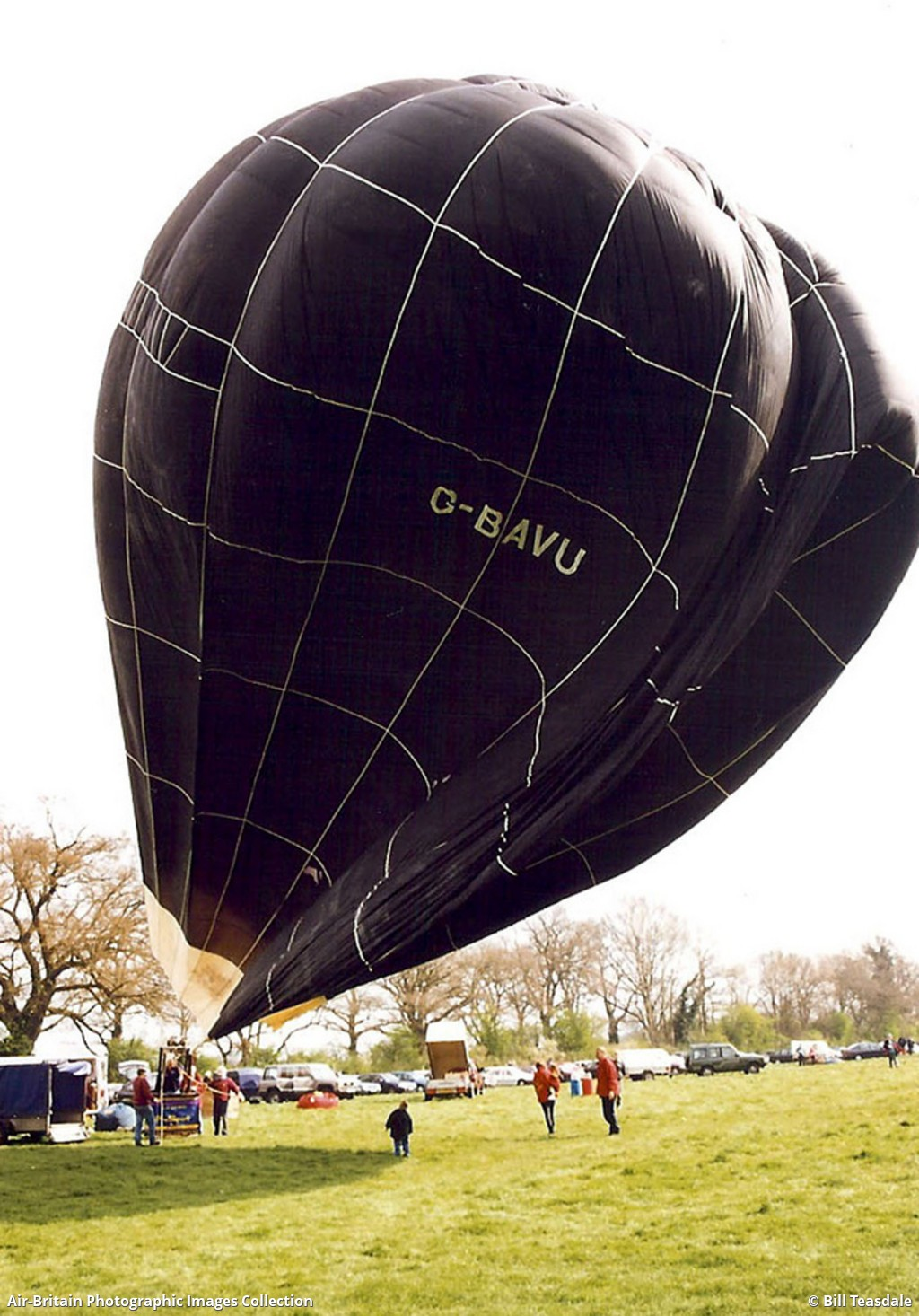
Solar powered balloon G-BAVU first to cross English Channel on 1 Nov 1984

Nott hypothesized that two millennia ago, the Nazca Lines geoglyphs could have been formed with guidance of Nazca leaders in a balloon, possibly the earliest balloon flights in human history. In 1975 to support this theory, he designed and piloted the Nazca Prehistoric Balloon, using only methods and materials available to the Pre-Inca Peruvians 1,000 years ago.

Nott believed, “...setting a world record is indisputable proof of the success of a new design.” In 1979 he designed and built the first hot air balloon with a pressurized gondola. On a late October morning from Longmont, Colorado he flew this new balloon to world record 55,134 feet (16,805 m). It took Nott, in his balloon named "ICI Innovation," 1 hour 9 minutes and 42 seconds to reach the world record altitude. The ICI Innovation gondola is permanently displayed at the Steven F. Udvar-Hazy Center of the Smithsonian National Air and Space Museum at Dulles Airport.

Nott pioneered the use of hybrid energy for lift, where solar power is a significant heat source, and using this technology in 1981 he crossed the English Channel. This hybrid balloon relied only the heat of the Sun to warm its lifting air during the crossing. For this historic flight, Nott used Dominic Michaelis’s solar balloon (aircraft registration number G-BAVU). On 22 August 1981, lifting off North West of Dover, he silently crossed the channel landing at Tournehem-sur-la-Hem of the Pas-de-Calais in France. Using the burner once, during the landing, to arrest the descent rate. The British Balloon Museum preserves the solar balloon G-BAVU envelope.

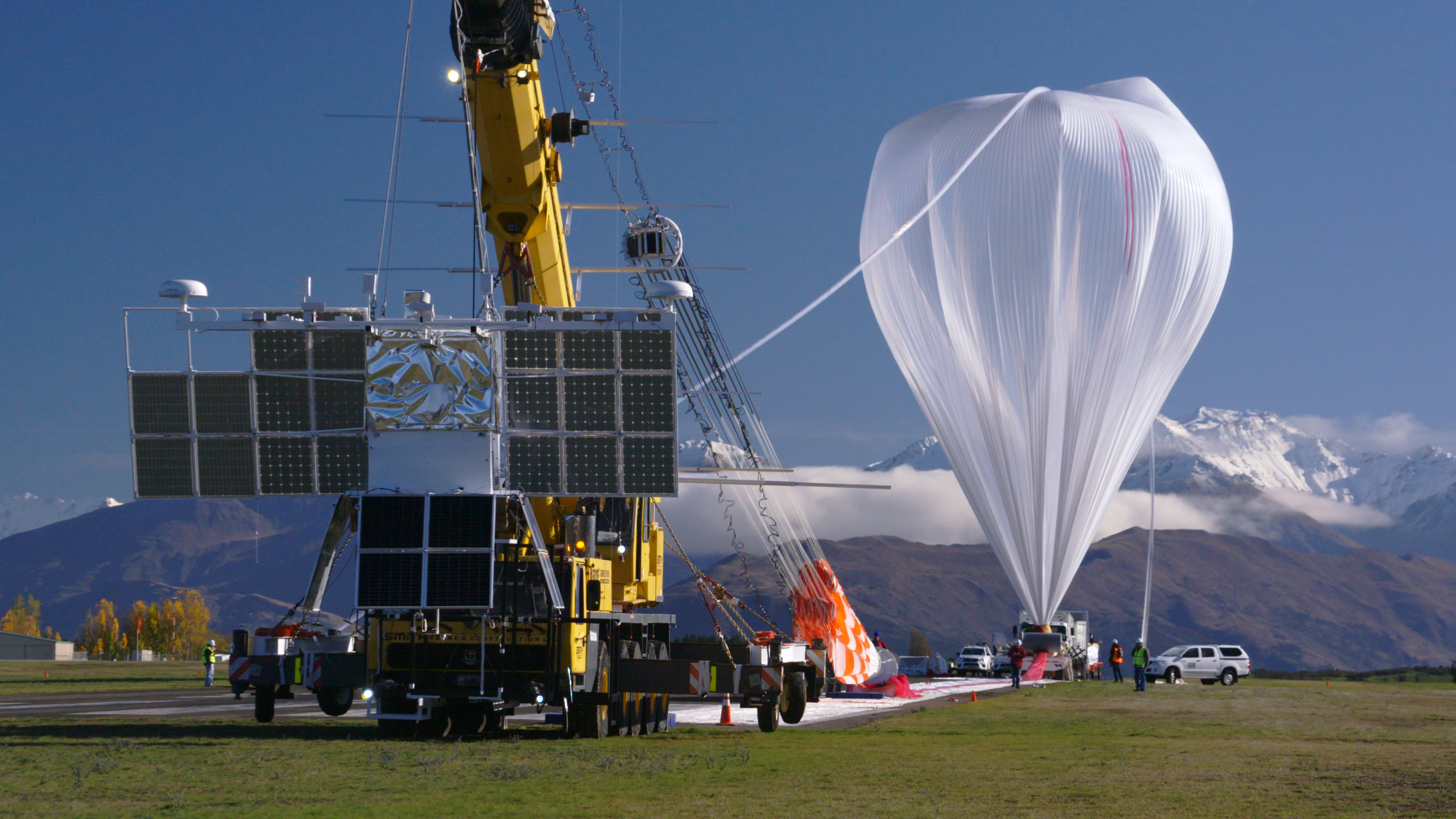
NASA superpressure balloon begins globetrotting journey from New Zealand

On 1 November 1984, Nott became the first person to pilot a “pumpkin” superpressure balloon (SPB). He flew the SPB Wilson Endeavour across Australia from Pearce Air Force Base in Perth to Broken Hill. He believed this was his greatest achievement and planned to use the SPB to circumnavigate the globe. The superpressure balloon concept was further developed and used by NASA to carry unmanned payloads of up to 8,000 pounds (3,600 kg) at up to 110,000 feet (34,000 m); circumnavigating the Earth for 7 to 55 days. Nott worked on the airships that flew over the 1984 Los Angeles and 2004 Athens Olympic Games. He developed a system for gas balloons in which conventional ballast is replaced with cryogenic helium.

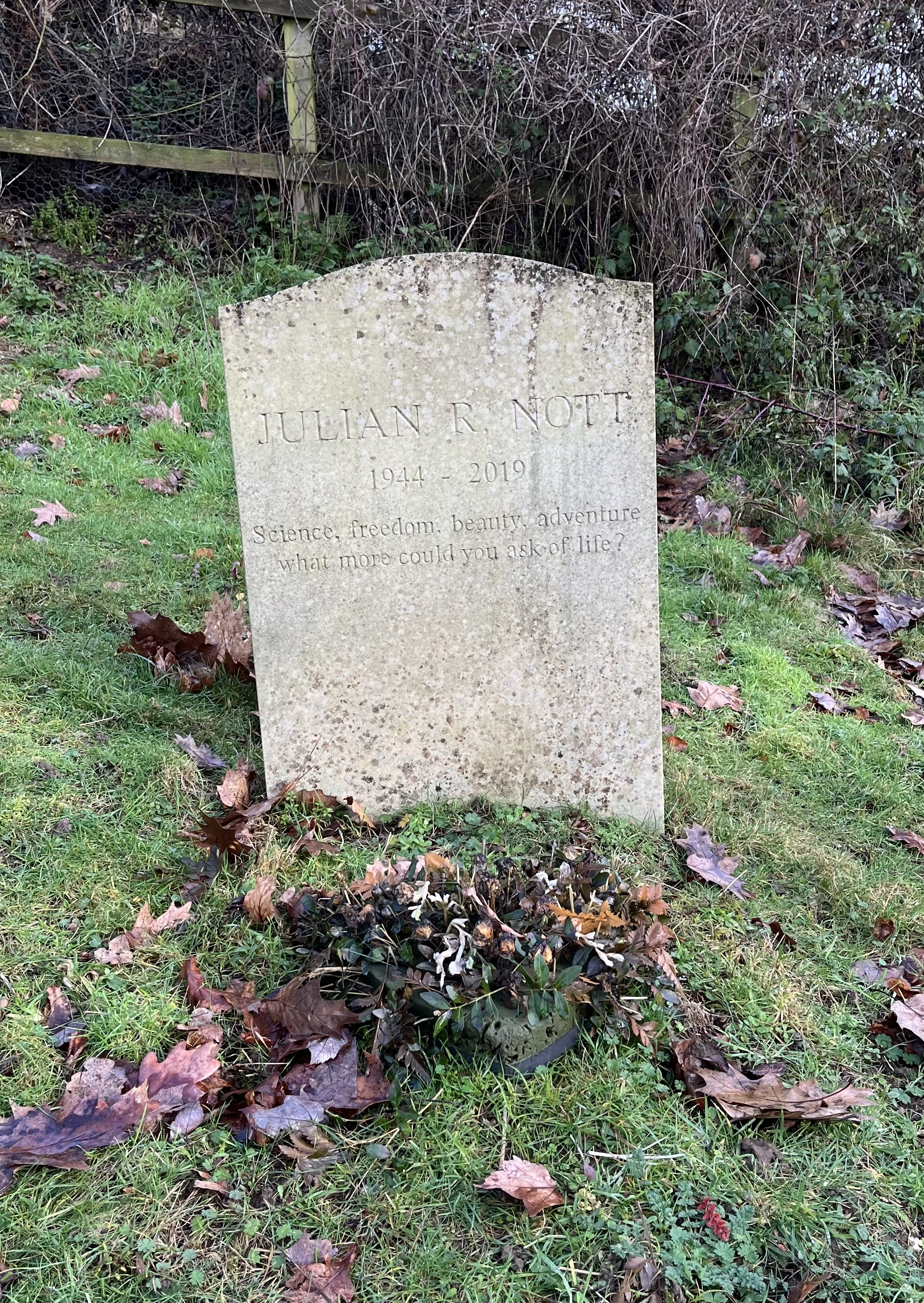
The grave of Julian Nott at the Watts Cemetery Chapel in Compton, Surrey

As Senior Balloon Consultant, Nott helped Alan Eustace break the world's highest parachute jump record from an altitude of 135,890 feet (41,420 m) on 24 October 2014.

In 2017, Nott set a world record for the highest tandem skydiving jump, from 31,916 feet (9,728 m).

As an adjunct professor at Caltech and the University of California, Nott lectured on entrepreneurship for scientist, engineers, and mathematicians. His senior memberships include: American Institute of Aeronautics and Astronautics, Royal Institute of Navigation, Royal Geographical Society, and an Explorers Club Fellow. Nott was also a member of the Society of Experimental Test Pilots.

== Personal life ==
In March 2019, following the successful test flight of an experimental pressurized high-altitude balloon over Warner Springs, California, and after a successful landing, his gondola became loose and fell down a slope with Nott inside. He was taken to Palomar Medical Center Escondido, where he died from the serious injuries of this accident. Nott is buried at the Compton Village Cemetery in Compton, Guildford Borough, Surrey, England.
