= 1937 New Year Honours =

British royal recognitions

The 1937 New Year Honours were appointments by King George VI to various orders and honours to reward and highlight good works by citizens of the United Kingdom and British Empire. They were the first honours of George VI's reign and were announced on 29 January 1937.

The recipients of honours are displayed here as they were styled before their new honour, and arranged by honour, with classes (Knight, Knight Grand Cross, etc.) and then divisions (Military, Civil, etc.) as appropriate.

== United Kingdom and Colonies ==
=== Aide-de-camp appointments ===
Royal Navy

- Captain H.R.H. The Duke of Kent, KG KT GCMG GCVO
- Commander The Lord Louis Mountbatten, KCVO

Personal

- Field-Marshal His Royal Highness The Duke of Connaught and Strathearn, KG KT KP GCB GCSI GCMG GCIE GCVO GBE VD TD Colonel Grenadier Guards, Colonel-in-Chief The Highland Light Infantry (City of Glasgow Regiment), The Rifle Brigade (Prince Consort's Own), Royal Army Service Corps, and Royal Army Medical Corps, Honorary Colonel 3rd Battalion (Militia) The Queen's Own Royal West Kent Regiment, 3rd and 4th Battalions (Militia) The Highland Light Infantry (City of Glasgow Regiment), 97th (Kent Yeomanry) Field Brigade (Army) Royal Artillery, Territorial Army, 6th (Duke of Connaught's Own) Battalion, The Hampshire Regiment, Territorial Army, 18th London Regiment (London Irish Rifles), Territorial Army.
- Major-General His Royal Highness The Duke of Gloucester, Earl of Ulster, KG KT KP GCMG GCVO Colonel-in-chief, The Gloucestershire Regiment, Honorary Colonel. Cambridge University Contingent, Officers Training Corps.
- His Royal Highness The Duke of Kent, Earl of St. Andrews, KG KT GCMG GCVO Colonel-in-chief The Queen's Own Royal West Kent Regiment.
- Honorary Major-General His Royal Highness. Prince Arthur of Connaught, KG KT GCMG GCVO Colonel retired pay (Reserve of Officers) Colonel-in-Chief The Royal Scots Greys (2nd Dragoons).
- Honorary Major-General the Earl of Athlone, KG PC GCB GCMG GCVO DSO DCL Colonel, retired pay, Colonel The Life Guards, and 7th Queen's Own Hussars, Honorary Colonel, University of London Contingent, Officers Training Corps (Governor and Constable of Windsor Castle).
- The Earl of Harewood, KG GCVO DSO TD Honorary Colonel 1st City of London Regiment (The Royal Fusiliers), Territorial Army.

Royal Air Force

- H.R.H. Henry William Frederick Albert, Duke of Gloucester, KG KT KP GCMG GCVO is granted a commission as an Air Vice-Marshal and is appointed Personal Aide-de-Camp to His Majesty The King, 1st Feb. 1937.

=== Viscount ===
- The Right Honourable Hamar, Baron Greenwood, KC Chairman of Dorman. For public services.

=== Baron ===
- Major Sir George Richard James Hennessy, Bt OBE JP Member of Parliament for Winchester 1918 to 1931. Treasurer of H.M. Household. 1928-29 and in 1931. Vice-Chamberlain 1925 to 1928. Lord Commissioner of H.M. Treasury 1922 to 1924. For political arid public services.
- Sir Harry Duncan McGowan, KBE Chairman of Imperial Chemical Industries Ltd. For public services.
- Sir Arthur Michael Samuel, Bt MP Member of Parliament for Farnham since December, 1918. Financial Secretary to the Treasury, November, 1927, to June, 1929. Parliamentary Secretary to the Department of Overseas Trade, November, 1924, to November, 1927. For political and public services.

=== Privy Councillor ===
- Major-General Robert, Baron Hutchison of Montrose, KCMG CB DSO H.M. Paymaster General.
- The Honourable Robert Gordon Menzies, KC Attorney-General and Minister for Industry of the Commonwealth of Australia.

=== Baronetcies ===
- Sir Derwent Hall Caine, Member of Parliament for Everton, 1929–31. For political and public services.
- Colonel the Honourable George Sidney Herbert, TD JP DL For political and public services in Wiltshire.
- Sir (William) Clare Lees, OBE JP Managing Director of the Bleachers Association Ltd. For services to the British cotton and artificial silk industries.
- Major Sir Henry Edward Lyons, OBE For political and public services.
- Robert Rankin, JP MP Member of Parliament for the Kirkdale division of Liverpool since 1931. For political and public services in Lancashire.
- Percy Malcolm Stewart, OBE JP Lately Commissioner for the Special Areas (England and Wales).

=== Knight Bachelor ===
- John Arthur Aiton, CBE For political and public services in Derbyshire.
- Joseph Arthur Arkwright, FRCP MRCS FRS Member of the Agricultural Research Council.
- Amos Lowrey Ayre, OBE JP, a past President of the National Confederation of Employers' Organisations.
- Adrian Cedric Boult, FRCM Conductor. Director of Music of the British Broadcasting Corporation.
- Robert Abraham Burrows, JP Chairman of Lancashire Associated Collieries.
- Nigel Leslie Campbell, a Managing Director of Helbert Wagg & Co. Ltd. Director of the Bankers' Industrial Development Company Ltd.
- Thomas Russell Albert Mason Cook, JP MP Member of Parliament for North Norfolk since October, 1931. For political and public services.
- Major Cyril Fullard Entwistle, MC KC MP Member of Parliament for Bolton since October, 1931, and for South-West Hull, 1918 to 1924. For political and public services.
- Harold Gibson Howitt, DSO MC FCA Chartered Accountant. For services to the Ministry of Agriculture and Fisheries.
- John Henry Morris-Jones, MC LRCP JP MP Member of Parliament for Denbigh since 1929. Lord Commissioner of H.M. Treasury (unpaid) since 1935.
- Norman Kendal, CBE Assistant Commissioner, Metropolitan Police.
- William Biggart Lang, JP President of the Machine Tool Trades Association.
- John Charles Grant Ledingham, CMG FRCP FRS Director of the Lister Institute, London. Professor of Bacteriology, University of London.
- Lieutenant-Colonel Albert George Lee, OBE MC Engineer-in-Chief, Post Office Engineering Department, General Post Office.
- Ernest Kaye Le Fleming, MRCS Chairman of the Council of the British Medical Association. A Member of the General Council of Medical Education and Registration of the United Kingdom.
- John McDonald, JP For political and public services in South-West Scotland.
- Thomas Macquaker, lately Honorary Secretary and Treasurer, and Chairman of Directors, Royal Samaritan Hospital for Women, Glasgow.
- Percival Edward Meadon, CBE Director of Education, Lancashire.
- Henry Frederick Oswald Norbury, Chief Registrar, Principal Probate Registry, Supreme Court of Judicature.
- William Richard Power. For political and public services in Hackney.
- Henry Phillip Price. For political and public services in Yorkshire.
- Samuel Servington Savery, JP MP Member of Parliament for Holderness, Yorkshire, since December, 1923. For political and public services.
- Leonard Foster Stedman, JP DL For political and public services in Monmouthshire.
- Colonel Gilbert Tanner, DSO TD JP For political and public services in Yorkshire and Lancashire.
- Judge Richard Augustus Vaux, President of the Mixed Court of Appeal, Egypt.
- Robert Waddington, Member of Parliament for Rossendale, 1918–1922. For political and public services in Lancashire.
- William Harold Webbe, CBE For political and public services in London.
- Anthony Henry Wingfield, JP DL For public services in Bedfordshire.
- Alfred Wood, Secretary to the British Sugar Corporation.

Dominions

- Jonathan Robert Cain, Lord Mayor of Adelaide, State of South Australia.
- George Harper, OBE Chairman of the Metropolitan Relief Committee, Christchurch, Dominion of New Zealand.
- Howard Watson Lloyd, Chairman of the Board of Directors of the Bank of Adelaide. For public services in the State of South Australia.
- Henry John Sheehan, CBE Secretary to the Treasury, Commonwealth of Australia.
- Alexander Anderson Stewart. For public and social welfare services in the Commonwealth of Australia.
- Arthur Streeton. For services to art in the Commonwealth of Australia.
- George Alexander Troup, CMG For public services in the Dominion of New Zealand.

India and Burma

- Diwan Bahadur Arcot Ramaswami Mudaliar, Member of the Council of the Secretary of State for India.
- Diwan Bahadur Siddappa Totappa Kambli, Minister for Education to the Governor of Bombay.
- Ponnambala Tyaga Rajan, Minister for Public Works to the Governor of Madras.
- Khan Bahadur Dhanjishah Bomanjee Cooper, Member of the Executive Council of the Governor of Bombay.
- Khan Bahadur Khwaja Muhammad Nur, CBE Puisne Judge of the High Court of Judicature at Patna, Bihar.
- Mya Bu, Barrister-at-Law, Puisne Judge of the High Court of Judicature at Rangoon, Burma.
- Panambur Raghavendra Rau, Financial Commissioner of Railways.
- Digby Livingstone Drake-Brockman, CSI CIE Indian Civil Service, Senior Member, Board of Revenue, United Provinces.
- Asoke Kumar Roy, Barrister-at-Law, Advocate-General, Calcutta, Bengal.
- Charles Gerald Trevor, CIE Indian Forest Service, Inspector-General of Forests, and President, Forest Research Institute and College, Dehra Dun.
- Captain Sardar Sher Mohammad Khan, CIE MBE Member of the Legislative Assembly, of Jhelum, Punjab.
- Colonel Charles Gordon Arthur, MC VD lately Sheriff of Calcutta, Senior Resident Partner of Messrs. Jardine Skinner & Co. Calcutta, Bengal.
- Arthur Joseph Curgenven, Indian Civil Service (retired), lately Puisne Judge of the High Court of Judicature at Fort St. George, Madras.
- Lieutenant-Colonel Donald Moyle Field, CIE Indian Army (retired), Chief Minister, Jodhpur State, Rajputana.

Colonies, Protectorates, etc.

- Alfred Horace D'Costa. For public services in Jamaica.
- Robert Evans Hall, Colonial Legal Service, Chief Justice, Uganda Protectorate.
- Leopold Frank Moore. For public services in Northern Rhodesia.
- John Allan Tarbat. For public services in Ceylon.
- Richard Clifford Tute, Colonial Legal Service, Chief Justice, Bahamas.

=== Order of the Bath ===
==== Knight Commander of the Order of the Bath (KCB) ====
Military Division

Royal Navy

- Vice-Admiral Francis Loftus Tottenham, CB CBE

Army

- Lieutenant-General Sir Charles John Cecil Grant, KCVO CB DSO (late Coldstream Guards), Colonel, The. King's Shropshire Light Infantry. Half-Pay, General Officer Commanding-in-Chief, Scottish Command, designate.
- Lieutenant-General Oswald Cuthbert Borrett, CB CMG CBE DSO Colonel, The King's Own Royal Regiment (Lancaster), Half-Pay. (Lieutenant of the Tower of London.)
- Lieutenant-General Sydney Frederick Muspratt, CB CSI CIE DSO Indian Army, late Commander, Peshawar District, Northern Command, India.

Civil Division

- Brigadier-General Bertram Percy Portal, CB DSO DL Chairman, Territorial Army Association of Hampshire and Isle of Wight.
- Major-General Thomas Seymour Coates, (late Royal Army Medical Corps), Honorary Physician to The King, Deputy Director of Medical Services, Aldershot Command.
- Major-General William Green, DSO (late The Black Watch (Royal Highlanders), and The Loyal Regiment (North Lancashire)), Half-Pay.
- Major-General Henry Maitland Wilson, DSO (late The Rifle Brigade (Prince Consort's Own)), Half-Pay.
- Major-General Algernon Lee Ransome, DSO MC (late The Dorsetshire Regiment), Half-Pay.
- Major-General Alan Francis Brooke, DSO (late Royal Artillery), Director of Military Training, The War Office.
- Major-General Michael George Henry Barker, DSO Colonel, The York and Lancaster Regiment, Director of Recruiting and Organization, The War Office.
- Major-General Dudley Stuart Collins, DSO (late Royal Engineers), Director of Fortifications and Works, The War Office.
- Major-General Herbert Stuart Gaskell, DSO (late Royal Engineers), Engineer-in-Chief, Headquarters Staff of the Army in India.
- Colonel (temporary Brigadier) Henry Coventry Maitland Makgill Crichton, CMG DSO (late The Royal Scots Fusiliers), Aide-de-Camp to The King, Commander, 14th Infantry Brigade, Northern Command.
- Colonel (temporary Brigadier) Charles Calveley Foss, VC DSO (late The Bedfordshire and Hertfordshire Regiment, and The King's Regiment (Liverpool)), Aide-de-Camp to The King, Commander, Rangoon Brigade Area, Burma Independent District, India.
- Major-General Alexander William Montgomery Harvey, Indian Medical Service, Honorary Surgeon to The King, Deputy Director of Medical Services, Northern Command, India.
- Major-General Henry Lawrence Haughton, CIE CBE Indian Army, Commander Kohat District, Northern Command, India.
- Major-General Arthur Brodie Haig, MC Indian Army, Deputy Adjutant and QuarterMaster-General, Eastern Command, India.
- Major-General John Dudley Lavarack, CMG DSO Australian Staff Corps, Chief of the Australian Section, Imperial General Staff.
- Major the Right Honourable Alexander Henry Louis Hardinge, CB CVO MC Private Secretary to His Majesty The King.
- Henry Thomas Tizard, CB AFC FRS Rector of the Imperial College of Science and Technology.

==== Companion of the Order of the Bath (CB) ====
Military Division

Royal Navy

- Rear-Admiral Robert Henry Taunton Raikes, CVO DSO
- Rear-Admiral John Cronyn Tovey, DSO
- Rear-Admiral Robert Ross Turner, DSO
- Rear-Admiral George Frederick Basset Edward-Collins.
- Engineer Rear-Admiral Edward Leopold Dyke Acland, MVO

Royal Air Force

- Air Vice-Marshal William Lawrie Welsh, DSC AFC Royal Air Force.
- Air Commodore Arthur William Tedder, Royal Air Force.

Civil Division

- Stanley Vernon Goodall, OBE
- Brevet Colonel John Cavendish, Viscount Cobham, TD President, Territorial Army Association of the County of Worcester.
- Colonel Claude Francis Liardet, DSO TD Territorial Army, Commander, Royal Artillery, The London Division.
- Colonel Evelyn FitzGerald Michell Wood, DSO OBE Secretary, Territorial Army and Air Force Association of the City of London.
- Arthur Henry Hall, CBE Chief Superintendent of the Royal Aircraft Establishment, Farnborough.
- Lionel David Barnett, lately Keeper of Oriental Printed Books and Manuscripts, British Museum.
- Ronald Ian Campbell, CMG Counsellor, Foreign Office.
- Frederick Charles Cook, DSO MC MInstCE Chief Engineer, Roads Department, Ministry of Transport.
- Marshall Millar Craig, KC Legal Secretary and Chief Parliamentary Draftsman, Lord Advocate's Department.
- Bernard William Gilbert, Principal Assistant Secretary, Treasury.
- Hampden Charles Gordon, Director of Army Contracts, War Office.
- Mark Frank Lindley, Comptroller General of Patents, Designs and Trade Marks and Comptroller of the Industrial Property Department, Board of Trade.
- Adolph Paul Oppé, Principal Assistant Secretary, Board of Education.
- Ernest James Turner, CBE Assistant Secretary, India

=== Order of the Star of India ===
==== Knight Grand Commander (GCSI) ====
- His Highness Maharaja Shri Sir Bhagwatsinhji Sagramji, GCIE Maharaja of Gondal, States of Western India.

==== Knight Commander (KCSI) ====
- Sir Osborne Arkell Smith, KCIE Governor of the Reserve Bank of India.

==== Companion (CSI) ====
- George Hemming Spence, CIE Indian Civil Service, Secretary to the Government of India in the Legislative Department.
- John Frederick Hall, CIE OBE Indian Civil Service, Acting First Member, Board of Revenue, Madras.
- Alexander Cameron Badenoch, CIE Indian Civil Service, Deputy Auditor-General in India.
- Frederick Anderson, CIE Indian Service of Engineers, Chief Engineer and Joint Secretary to the Government of the United Provinces in the Public Works Department, Irrigation Branch, United Provinces.
- Thomas Bailey Tate, Indian Service of Engineers, Chief Engineer and Secretary to the Government of the Punjab in the Public Works Department, Irrigation Branch, Punjab.

=== Order of Saint Michael and Saint George ===
==== Knight Grand Cross of the Order of St Michael and St George (GCMG) ====
- Sir Thomas Shenton Whitelegge Thomas, KCMG OBE Governor and Commander-in-Chief of the Straits Settlements and High Commissioner for the Malay States.
- Sir Miles Wedderburn Lampson, KCMG CB MVO His Majesty's Ambassador Extraordinary and Plenipotentiary at Cairo.
- Sir Herbert William Malkin, KCMG CB KC Legal Adviser to the Foreign Office.

==== Knight Commander of the Order of St Michael and St George (KCMG) ====
- Sir Andrew Caldecott, CMG CBE Governor and Commander-in-Chief of the Colony of Hong Kong, and Governor and Commander-in-Chief designate of Ceylon.
- Louis Bernhardt George Stephen Beale, CBE Commercial Counsellor at His Majesty's Consulate-General at Shanghai.
- Charles Henry Bentinck, CMG His Majesty's Envoy Extraordinary and Minister Plenipotentiary at Prague.
- Orme Garton Sargent, CB CMG Assistant Under-Secretary of State in the Foreign Office.

Colonies, Protectorates, etc.

- Herbert Henniker-Heaton, CMG Governor and Commander-in-Chief of the Colony of the Falkland Islands.
- Philip Euen Mitchell, CMG MC Governor and Commander-in-Chief of the Uganda Protectorate.
- Frank Arthur Stockdale, CMG CBE Agricultural Adviser to the Secretary of State for the Colonies.

==== Companion of the Order of St Michael and St George (CMG) ====
- Hubert Frazer East. For services to ex-service men in the Commonwealth of Australia.
- Professor Hugh Mackenzie, Foundation Professor of English Language and Literature, Victoria University College, Wellington, Dominion of New Zealand.
- William Rupert McCourt, Clerk of the Legislative. Assembly, State of New South, Wales. Andrew Kidd McGaw. For public services in the State of Tasmania.
- James Gray Moseley, one of the early pioneers and for many years a Member of the House of Assembly, State of South Australia. On the occasion of the Centenary of the State.
- Edmund Charles Richards, Resident Commissioner, Basutoland.
- Robert Arthur Wiseman, Assistant Secretary, Dominions Office.
- Theodore Samuel Adams, Colonial Administrative Service, British Resident, Selangor, Federated Malay States.
- Allan Wolsey Cardinall, Commissioner, Cayman Islands, Jamaica. George Hugo Findlay, Colonial Administrative Service, Senior Resident, Nigeria.
- Vincent Goncalves Glenday, OBE Colonial Administrative Service, Provincial Commissioner, Kenya.
- William John Andrew Jones, Colonial Administrative Service, Chief Commissioner, Northern Territories, Gold Coast.
- William Henry Kauntze, MBE Colonial Medical Service, Director of Medical Services, Uganda Protectorate.
- Robert Marrs, CIE Principal, Ceylon University College.
- Clifford Henry Fitzherbert Plowman, OBE Colonial Administrative Service, Secretary to the Government, Somaliland Protectorate.
- Alexander Sym Small, Colonial Administrative Service, Colonial Secretary, Straits Settlements.
- Arthur Alban Wright, Colonial Administrative Service, Administrator and Colonial Secretary, St. Vincent, Windward Islands
- Charles Harold Bateman, MC Counsellor at His Majesty's Embassy at Bagdad.
- Captain Esmé Nourse Erskine, MC lately His Majesty's Consul for Western Abyssinia.
- Desmond John Falkiner Morton, MC Director, Department of Overseas Trade.
- John Hurleston Leche, OBE Counsellor at His Majesty's Embassy at Buenos Aires.
- Hyacinthe Louis Rabino di Borgomale, OBE His Majesty's Consul-General at Cairo.
- Patrick Maxwell Roberts, a First Secretary in His Majesty's Diplomatic Service, lately His Majesty's Charge d'Affaires at Addis Ababa.

=== Order of the Indian Empire ===
==== Knight Commander (KCIE) ====
- Rai Bahadur Sir Kurma Venkata Reddy Naidu, Member of the Executive Council of the Governor of Madras.
- Duncan George Mackenzie, CIE of the Political Department, Resident at Hyderabad.
- Thomas Alexander Stewart, CSI Indian Civil Service, Secretary to the Government of India in the Department of Commerce.
- Charles William Aldis Turner, CSI CIE Indian Civil Service, Chief Secretary to the Government of Bombay, Bombay.
- Major-General Digby Inglis Shuttleworth, CB CBE DSO Indian Army (retired), lately Commander, Kohat District.

==== Companion (CIE) ====
- Khan Bahadur Maulvi Azizul Haque, Minister for Education (excluding European Education), Wakf and Registration to the Governor of Bengal.
- Conrad Laurence Corfield, MC of the Political Department, Joint Secretary to the Government of India in the Foreign and Political Department.
- Robert Charles Arthur Stanley Hobart, Indian Civil Service, Commissioner, United Provinces.
- Frank Lugard Brayne, MC VD Indian Civil Service, Commissioner, Rural Reconstruction, Punjab.
- Henry Hewat Craw, Indian Civil Service, Chief Secretary to the Government of Burma, Burma.
- Hiranand Khushiram Kirpalani, Indian Civil Service, Chief Secretary to the Government of Sind, Sind.
- Colonel (Temporary Brigadier) Alick Lindsay Mortimer Molesworth, Indian Army, Commander, Landi Kotal Brigade.
- Colonel (Temporary Brigadier) John de Lisle Conry, Indian Army, Commander, Mhow Brigade Area.
- Lieutenant-Colonel Robert Prince, OBE Indian Army (retired), Military Accountant-General in India.
- Lieutenant-Colonel Reginald Charles Francis Schomberg, DSO His Majesty's Consul-General in the French Establishments in India.
- Olaus Macleod Martin, Indian Civil Service, Additional Commissioner, Presi.dency and Burdwan Divisions, Bengal.
- Harold George Dennehy, Indian Civil Service, Secretary to the Government of Assam in the Transferred Departments, Assam.
- Arthur Cecil Davies, Indian Civil Service, Secretary to the Government of Bihar in the Judicial Department and Superintendent and Remembrancer of Legal Affairs, Bihar.
- Chintaman Dwarkanath Deshmukh, Indian Civil Service, Secretary to the Government of the Central Provinces in the Finance Department, Central Provinces.
- Cecil George Freke, Indian Civil Service, Secretary to the Government of Bombay in the Finance Department, Bombay.
- Cyril Edgar Jones, Indian Civil Service, Secretary to the Government of Madras in the Finance Department, Madras.
- Captain Charles Huskisson Corser, Royal Indian Navy.
- Lieutenant-Colonel Richard Edward Flowerdew, DTM&H Indian Medical Service, Inspector-General of Prisons, Bengal.
- Tyrrell Churton Orgill, Indian Educational Service, Director of Public Instruction, North-West Frontier Province.
- Charles Edward Langley Gilbert, Indian Forest Service, Chief Conservator of Forests, Bombay Presidency, Bombay.
- David Penman, FRSE Chief Inspector of Mines in India, and lately Principal, Indian School of Mines, Dhanbad.
- Raja Birendra Bikram Singh, Member of the United Provinces Legislative Council, Landowner and Chairman, District Board, Bahraich, United Provinces.
- Austen Havelock Layard, Indian Civil Service, Deputy Commissioner of Delhi.
- Albert Cyril Woodhouse, Madras Civil Service, Collector and District Magistrate, Madras.
- M. R. Ry. Rao Bahadur Tiruvadi Sambasivaiyer Venkataraman Avargal, Indian Agricultural Service, Sugarcane Expert, Imperial Cane Breeding Station, Coimbatore.
- Herbert Leonard Offley Garrett, Indian Educational Service (retired), lately Principal, Government College, Lahore, Punjab.
- John Monteath, Indian Civil Service (retired), Dewan, Junagadh State, States of Western India.
- Graham Colville Ramsay, OBE Deputy Director of the Ross Institute of Tropical Hygiene, London School of Hygiene and Tropical Medicine.

=== Royal Victorian Order ===
==== Dame Grand Cross of the Royal Victorian Order (GCVO) ====
- The Queen

==== Grand Master of the Royal Victorian Order ====
- The Queen

==== Knight Grand Cross of the Royal Victorian Order (GCVO) ====
- Major Sir Philip Hunloke, KCVO (Dated 15 July 1936.)
- Commander Lord Louis Francis Albert Victor Nicholas Mountbatten, KCVO RN
- The Right Honourable Hugh Pattison, Baron Macmillan.

==== Knight Commander of the Royal Victorian Order (KCVO) ====
- Captain Lord Claud Nigel Hamilton, CMG CVO DSO
- John Fraser, MC FRCS
- Walter Turner Monckton, MC KC

==== Commander of the Royal Victorian Order (CVO) ====
- The Reverend John Stirton, MVO (Dated 26 September 1936.)
- Lieutenant-Colonel Edwin Charles Cox, CBE MVO
- Captain Lionel Frederic Ellis, CBE DSO MC
- Arthur Sydney Hutchinson
- Major Douglas William Alexander Dalziel Mackenzie, DSO MVO
- Clifford John Norton, CMG

==== Member of the Royal Victorian Order, 4th class (MVO) ====
- Commander Charles Leslie Firth, RN (Dated 6 September 1936.)
- Major Sir John Renton Aird, Bt MC (Dated 30 October 1936.)
- Wing Commander Edward Hedley Fielden AFC RAF (Dated 30 October 1936.)
- Commander Charles Alfred Godfrey Nichols, RN (Dated 13 November 1936.)
- Hugh Macrae Alfred Vigor Marten, MVO (Fifth Class).
- Henry Alexander Russell

==== Member of the Royal Victorian Order, 5th class (MVO) ====
- Albert Barr Turner (Dated 15 July 1936)
- Nicholas Percy Doyle (Dated 6 September 1936.)
- Frank Harvey Evans
- Gilbert Sidney Herlihy
- Henry George Pinnock
- Sidney Ernest Povey
- Frank Gann Redward

=== Order of Merit ===
- The Right Honourable Herbert Albert Laurens Fisher, FRS Warden of New College, Oxford. In recognition of his eminent position as an Historian and of his services to Literature.

=== Order of the British Empire ===
==== Dame Commander of the Order of the British Empire (DBE) ====
- Juliet Evangeline, Lady Williams, Honorary Treasurer, Queen Charlotte's Anaesthetic Fund, Honorary Secretary, Joint Council of Midwifery.

Colonies, Protectorates, etc.

- Mary Gilmore. For contributions to literature in the Commonwealth of Australia.

==== Knight Commander of the Order of the British Empire (KBE) ====
Military Division

Royal Navy

- Vice-Admiral Ragnar Musgrave Colvin, CB CBE
- Vice-Admiral Gerard Aylmer Wells (Retired).

Army

- Major-General John Kennedy, CB CMG DSO Retired Pay, Colonel, The Buffs (Royal East Kent Regiment).

Civil Division

- Bernard Humphrey Bell, CBE Legal Secretary to the Sudan Government.
- Alderman John Hampden Inskip. For political and public services in Bristol.

Colonies, Protectorates, etc.

- The Honourable Herbert Sydney Hudd, MC Commissioner of Public Works, Minister of Railways, and Minister of Marine, State of South Australia.
- Sir John Hope Simpson, CIE lately a Member of the Commission of Government, Newfoundland.
- Sir Eliot Arthur de Pass, President of the West India Committee.

==== Commander of the Order of the British Empire (CBE) ====
Military Division

Royal Navy

- Captain Llewellyn Vaughan Morgan, MVO DSC RN
- Surgeon Captain (D) Edward Ernest Fletcher, OBE RN
- The Reverend Thomas Crick, MVO RN
- Surgeon Captain William James Carr, MRCS LRCP RAN

Army

- Colonel (honorary Brigadier) Compton Cardew Norman, CMG DSO Retired Pay, General List, Regular Army Reserve of Officers, late Inspector-General, Royal West African Frontier Force and The King's African Rifles.

Royal Air Force

- Air Commodore James Bevan Bowen, OBE Royal Air Force.

Civil Division

- Florence Maude, Baroness Ashton. For political and public services in Lancashire.
- Henry Angley Lewis-Dale, MBE MInstCE MIMechE Deputy Director of Works and Buildings, Air Ministry.
- Evelyn Emily Marion Fox, Honorary Secretary, Central Association for Mental Welfare.
- Henry Guppy, Librarian at the John Rylands Library, Manchester.
- Cyril Wood-Hill, Assistant Legal Adviser and Solicitor, Ministry of Agriculture and Fisheries.
- Commander Richard John Bayntun Hippisley, OBE TD MIEE JP DL (late RNVR), Area Traffic Commissioner, Western Area.
- John Allan Lindsay, JP DL Chairman of the Leith Local Employment Committee.
- Allan Ernest Messer, Agent and Secretary to the Chequers Trust.
- Arthur Nevil Rucker, Assistant Secretary, Ministry of Health.
- Harry Ratcliff Spiers, Accountant and Comptroller General, Board of Inland Revenue.
- William Henry Tyrer, OBE Town Clerk of Wigan.
- Alfred George Hastings White. Lately Librarian to the Royal Society.
- Alice Helena Alexandra Williams, Chairman of the Forum Club.
- John Wittet, JP For political and public services in Morayshire.

India

- Narayana Raghavan Pillai, Indian Civil Service, Collector of Customs, Karachi, Sind.

Colonies, Protectorates, etc.

- Nathaniel Griffith Lerotholi, Paramount Chief of Basutoland. For loyal and devoted services.
- Joseph William Allan Heenan, Under-Secretary, Department of Internal Affairs, Dominion of New Zealand.
- George Jeffrey, Member of the Agricultural Bureau, State of South Australia.
- Donald Mackay, OBE For services in connection with scientific exploration and survey in the interior of Australia.
- Charles Arthur Norris, OBE FIA For public services in the State of Victoria.
- Major James Edward Francis Campbell, OBE Colonial Administrative Service, District Commissioner of Jerusalem, Palestine.
- Percival Alfred Dingle, MRCS LRCP Principal Medical Officer to the Government of North Borneo.
- Clement Gillman, Chief Engineer, Railways, Tanganyika Territory.
- Arthur Edward Hamp, MICE Chief Engineer, Kenya and Uganda Railways and Harbours.
- James Drogo Montagu, Colonial Administrative Service, Commissioner, Cyprus.
- William James Howard Trott. For public services in Bermuda.

Overseas Residents

- George Leader Bailey, a British resident in Greece.
- Colonel Harold Edwin Manthorpe Woods, OBE Commercial Counsellor at His Majesty's Embassy at Angora.
- Frederick Trestrail Clive Young, Governor of the Blue Nile Province, Sudan.

Honorary Commanders

- Che Mohamed Sheriff bin Osman, Secretary to Government, Kedah, Malay States.
- Viliami Tungī, Premier of Tonga.

==== Officer of the Order of the British Empire (OBE) ====
Military Division

Royal Navy

- Commander Gilbert Arthur Bennet Hills, RN (Retired).
- Engineer Commander Stanley Herbert Sims, MVO RN
- Paymaster Commander John McLeod More, DSC RN
- Lieutenant-Commander William Richmond Fell, RN
- Lieutenant-Commander Joseph Devine, RN (Retired).
- Lieutenant-Commander John Elliott Moncrieff Noad, RNVR
- Commander Harry Leslie Howden, RAN

Colonies, Protectorates, etc.

- Lieutenant-Colonel George Brown, DSO Royal Engineers (Indian Army), Assistant Commander, Royal Engineers (Works), Rawalpindi District, India.
- Captain Rowland Webster Booth, Staff Officer, Basutoland Mounted Police.
- Lieutenant-Colonel George Boyle Hanna, Indian Medical Service, Officer Commanding, Indian Military Hospital, Quetta, India.
- Major (Quarter-Master) James Hawke, Royal Corps of Signals (Indian Army), Officer in Charge, Records, Signal Training Centre, Jubbulpore, India.
- Lieutenant-Colonel (Honorary Colonel) John Archibald Polwhele, VD General List, Auxiliary Force, India, late Officer Commanding, Northern Bengal Mounted Rifles, Auxiliary Forces India.
- Lieutenant-Colonel Gordon Alan Potts, MC late Lieutenant-Colonel Commanding, 1st Battalion, Straits Settlements Volunteer Force (Singapore Volunteer Corps).
- Captain and Brevet Major Edgar Charles Priestley, Educational Corps, late Instructor, Kitchener College, Nowgong, India.
- Lieutenant-Colonel John Laurence Short, The King's. Regiment (Liverpool).
- Major Wilfred Bernard Whishaw, MC Royal Engineers, Staff Officer, Royal Engineers, 2nd Grade, Engineer-in-Chief's Branch, Headquarters of the Army in India.

Civil Division

- Norah Augusta Juanita Annandale. For political and public services in Leith.
- Paul Archer, MBE Principal Clerk, Manchester Branch, Office of the Public Trustee.
- George Thomas Thorpe Bartram, JP For political and public services in Essex.
- Carlyle Cecil Bensted, H.M. Senior Inspector of Taxes, Birmingham 1st District, Board of Inland Revenue.
- Margaret Isabella Blackett. For political and public services in Fife.
- Gilbert Carmichael, Senior Assistant Secretary, Office of the Commissioner of Metropolitan Police.
- Clifford Chaffer, Principal Technical Officer, Compass Department, Admiralty.
- William Alfred Richard Channer, Assistant Director for Cash Accounts, Air Ministry.
- Francis Hare Clayton, Chairman and Treasurer of the Shaftesbury Homes and Arethusa Trainingship.
- Wilhelmina Link Custance, Headmistress of Rowley Hall School, Stafford.
- Gershom Willoughby Cecil Davis, Chief Accountant, Clearing Office (Enemy Debts), Board of Trade.
- Stephen Mitchell Dixon, MSc MICE lately Member of the Safety in Mines Research Board.
- Alexander Thomas Dodd, Deputy Chief Inspector, Board of Customs and Excise.
- Thomas Husband Gill. For political and public services in Plymouth.
- Henrietta Girling, JP For public services in Shoreditch.
- Ralph Eliot Gomme, Principal, Ministry of Labour.
- Margaret Annie Grant, Head Mistress, Withington Girls School, Manchester.
- Bernard Hart, Honorary Consulting Radiologist to the Doncaster Royal Infirmary.
- Mary Higgs. For public services in Oldham.
- Stephen Reginald Hobday, Clerk and General Manager of the Lee Conservancy Board.
- Florence Keen, Founder and Honorary Treasurer and Secretary of the North Islington Infant Welfare Centre.
- Hugh Sadler Kingsford, Assistant Secretary, Society of Antiquaries of London.
- Alexander Smith Langlands, Assistant Surveyor, Class I, South Eastern District, General Post Office.
- Robert Gumming Thomson Mair, MC Director of Education, Lanarkshire.
- The Honourable Lilian Helen Montagu, JP Chairman of the West Central Jewish Girls' Club.
- George Herbert Pethybridge, Lately Mycologist and Assistant Director, Plant Pathological Department, Harpenden.
- Eric Fryer Piercy, General Secretary of the National Association of Boys' Clubs.
- Alderman Alfred Thomas Pike, lately Secretary to the Garden Cities and Town Planning Association.
- Joseph Spearman Potts. For political services in the North West of England.
- Arthur Thomas Redfern, Head Postmaster, Norwich.
- Thomas Edward Sanders, JP For political and public services in Stroud, Gloucestershire.
- Ernest Arthur Smith, MBE Chief Technical Officer for Fuel, H.M. Office of Works and Public Buildings.
- John Andrew Whitson Stone, Secretary and Accounting Officer, General Board of Control for Scotland.
- Frederick Thomas Tarry, Chief Constable, Exeter City Police.
- Fanny Isabel Taylor, H.M. Deputy Chief Inspector of Factories, Home Office.
- Alderman Francis Harold Turnbull, JP Chairman of the Cardiff Juvenile Employment Committee.
- James Annand Williams, Financial Adviser to the General Officer Commanding the British Troops in Egypt.

Overseas recipients

- The Venerable Archdeacon John Batchelor, a British resident in Japan.
- William Brydon Chilton, a British resident at Qinhuangdao, China.
- Lieutenant William Stewart Empey, Indian Medical Service, recently Leader of the British Ambulance Unit No. 1 in Ethiopia.
- James Guthrie, His Majesty's Consul at Norfolk, Virginia.
- William Alfred Pickwoad, a British resident at La Paz, Bolivia.
- Sidney George West, recently Professor of English at Coimbra University, Lisbon.

Colonies, Protectorates, etc.

- George Moncrieff Barren, FRACS Member of the Council of the New South Wales Branch of the British Medical Association. For social welfare services in the State of New South Wales.
- Mary Daly. For charitable and social welfare services in the State of Victoria.
- Sydney Letts Dawkins, For services in connection with the St. John Ambulance Brigade in the State of South Australia.
- Colin Eric Duff, lately Secretary, Department of Internal Affairs, Southern Rhodesia.
- Eileen May Duggan, For contributions to literature in the Dominion of New Zealand.
- The Reverend Samuel Forsyth. For social welfare services in the State of South Australia.
- May Furlong. For services to ex-service men and their dependents in Newfoundland.
- Percy Albert Gourgaud, Assistant Secretary, Works and Services Branch, Department of the Interior, Commonwealth of Australia.
- Leslie Ferdinand Johnston, Government Printer, Canberra, Commonwealth of Australia.
- Jane Evelyn McCallen, Education Secretary, Victoria League. For services in connection with hospitality for Dominion students in London.
- Harry Bertram Adair McCarter, Deputy Resident Commissioner, and Assistant Commissioner, Northern District, Swaziland.
- Rachel McGirr. For social welfare services in the Commonwealth of Australia.
- Adelaide Laetitia Miethke, President of the Women's Centenary Council, State of South Australia, for the Festival Year, 1936.
- Anna Elizabeth Jerome Spencer. For social welfare services in the Dominion of New Zealand.
- Morris Bailey, Colonial Administrative Service, Assistant District Commissioner, Palestine.
- Frank Edward Mamertus Beatley, General Manager and Traffic Manager, Sierra Leone Railway.
- Robert Barker Crusher, MBE Assistant Director of Surveys, Palestine.
- Henry Creni Curmi, Commissioner for Malta in the Commonwealth of Australia.
- Percy Edward Lovell Gethin, AFC Chief Surveyor and Director of Civil Aviation, Tanganyika Territory.
- Thomas Maynard Hazlerigg, MC Colonial Legal Service, Crown Solicitor, Hong Kong.
- Major Sydney Banks Keast, MC Director of Public Works, Gold Coast.
- Kobina Arku Korsah. For public services in the Gold Coast.
- William Henry Lloyd, Colonial Administrative Service, Resident, Nigeria.
- Edward Alfred Luckhoo. For public services in British Guiana.
- Victor William Tighe McGusty, Colonial Administrative Service, Secretary for Indian Affairs and Inspecting Medical Officer, Fiji.
- George James Partridge, Colonial Administrative Service, First Assistant Chief Secretary, Tanganyika Territory.
- William Henry Pearce, MC City Engineer, Gibraltar.
- Hubert Kennett Purcell, Head of the General Department and Chief Clerk, Crown Agents for the Colonies.
- Gerald Reece, Colonial Administrative Service, District Officer, Kenya.
- Alexander Moir Reid. For public services in the Leeward Islands.
- James Eldon McCombie Salmon, Commissioner of Appeals, St. Lucia, Windward Islands.
- John Grindon Strickland, AMICE Assistant Director of Surveys, Uganda Protectorate.
- William Egbert Thompson, Surgeon Specialist, Palestine.
- Edward Ernest Howard Thorne. For public services in Barbados.
- Constance Marianne Douglas Wade. For public services in Kenya.
- George Henry Webster, Deputy Postmaster-General, Palestine.

India

- Captain Lance Mount Barlow, MC Indian Army, Private Secretary to the Governor of the North-West Frontier Province.
- Rai Bahadur Mathura Prasad Bhola, lately Deputy Conservator of Forests, United Provinces.
- Major Percy Trant Clarke, Indian Army, Private Secretary to the Governor of Bihar.
- Khan Bahadur Ardeshir Sorabji Dalai, Superintendent of Excise, Government Central Distillery, Nasik, Bombay.
- Robert Henry Locke, Superintendent, Horticultural Operations, New Delhi.
- James Owen Marsland, Manager, Rodier Mill at Pondicherry.
- William McKenzie Mather, MBE Private Secretary to the High Commissioner for India, London.
- Hiranya Kumar Mitter, Zamindar, Calcutta, Bengal.
- Khan Bahadur Manikji Merwanji Mullna, Member of the Central Provinces Legislative Council, Pleader and Public Prosecutor, Central Provinces.
- Lieutenant-Colonel (Honorary Colonel) Douglas Muir Reid, MC Director, Messrs. W. A. Beardsell & Co., Ltd., Madras.
- John Adam Scroggie, Indian Police, Superintendent of Police, Punjab.
- Eugene Wentworth-Disney Jackson, MC Indian Service of Engineers, Executive Engineer (Irrigation), Meiktila Division, Burma.

Honorary Officers

- Hassan Faiz Effendi Idrissi, MBE Assistant Superintendent of Police, Palestine.
- Abdul Razzaq Ali Qleibo, MBE Administrative Officer, Palestine.

==== Member of the Order of the British Empire (MBE) ====
Military Division

Royal Navy

- Headmaster Frederick Storer, RN
- Lieutenant (E.) Tom Kershaw, RN (Retired).
- Commissioned Gunner Francis William Wheble, RN
- Commissioned Boatswain Ernest Edwin Kay, RN
- Commissioned Signal Boatswain Robert Frederick Cubitt, RN (Retired).
- Commissioned Engineer Sydney Albert William Chisholm, RAN

Army

- Regimental Sergeant-Major Richard Alick Blackwell, Permanent Staff Corps, Southern Rhodesia Defence Force.
- Conductor Thomas William Butcher, Indian Army Corps of Clerks, Headquarters, Southern Command, Poona, India.
- Captain David Colville, The King's Shropshire Light Infantry, Adjutant, Malacca Volunteer Corps, 4th Battalion, Straits Settlements Volunteer Force.
- 1st Class Assistant Surgeon Eugene Duckworth, Indian Medical Department, Manager, Medical Store Depot, Lahore Cantonments, India.
- Quarter-Master and Honorary Lieutenant Arthur Elgin Hunter, Royal Australian Engineers, Staff Officer, Engineer Services, 8th District Base, Australian Military Forces.
- Subadar Payanda Khan, IDSM 10th (Abbottabad) Mountain Battery, Royal Artillery.
- Warrant Officer Class I, Regimental Sergeant-Major Werkmeisder Denzil Muerling, Ceylon Engineers, Ceylon Defence Force.
- Sub-Conductor Jabez Alfred Roberts, Indian Army Corps of Clerks, Headquarters, Peshawar Brigade Area, Northern Command, India.
- Warrant Officer Class II, Company Sergeant-Major Raja Suleiman bin Raja Mohamed Sapian, Selangor Battalion, Federated Malay States Volunteer Force.

Royal Air Force

- Quartermaster (Honorary Flight Lieutenant) Hugh Cully, RAAF

Civil Division

- Major. William Powrie Lang Arnott, Chief Clerk, Central European District, Imperial War Graves Commission.
- Albert Edward Baylis, Senior Quantity Surveyor, H.M. Office of Works and Public Buildings.
- Charles Bennett, Acting Senior Contract Officer, Air Ministry.
- Kate Janet Berry. For political services in the Epsom Division.
- Jane Thorpe Booth, Matron, Stepping Hill Hospital, Stockport.
- Margaret Agnes Bradford, Chief Supervisor, Counter and Telegraphs, London Postal Region, General Post Office.
- John Hall Burden, Headmaster, The Downham Boys' Central School, Lewisham.
- Ada Mary Butcher. For political and public services in North St. Pancras.
- John Herbert Butler, Headmaster, South Wigston Boys' Council School, Leicestershire.
- Walter Thomas Cockle, Borough Treasurer of Barking. Honorary Treasurer to the Barking Social Services Committee.
- Henry Dalton, Superintendent, Metropolitan Police.
- Councillor James Eden, JP For services to local government in Rainford and district, Lancashire.
- Alderman Henry Eddy, JP For political and public services in Knaresborough, Yorkshire.
- The Reverend Henry Every, Chairman of the Torquay Juvenile Advisory Committee.
- Archibald William Fisher, Secretary, Scottish National Union of Allotment Holders.
- Frank Fisher, JP Chairman of the Carlingford Lough Commission and a Member of the Newry Port and Harbour Trust, County Down.
- Helen Galbraith, Deputy Chief Inspector, Department of Health for Scotland.
- Margaret Galbraith, Headmistress, Rubislaw Special School, Aberdeen.
- Alexander Gordon, Staff Officer, Tax Inspecting Branch, Board of Inland Revenue.
- Councillor Alice Marie Juillerat Graham, Chairman of the Children's Sub-Committee of the Ealing, Acton, Southall, Uxbridge and District War Pensions Committee.
- Alderman Thomas Everitt Hewitt, JP For political and public services in Southwark.
- Alexander Gait Highet, Assistant Controller, Publicity, Public Relations Department, General Post Office.
- Annie Maud Hodge, Headmistress of Osmondthorpe Senior Girls' School, Leeds.
- Kate Stevenson John. For political and public services in Edinburgh.
- Paymaster Commander Charles William Jones, RD RN (Retd.), lately Senior Chief Superintendent, Mercantile Marine Office Service, Board of Trade.
- John William Kybird. For political and public services in Thetford, Norfolk.
- Robert Magowan, Senior Staff Officer, Ministry of Health.
- John Charles Magrath, Accountant, General Post Office.
- Mary Allan Muirhead, a member of the staff of the Conservative Central Office for many years. For political services.
- Robert George Cockburn Nisbet, Assistant Accountant, Department of Agriculture for Scotland.
- William John Northen, Chief Relieving Officer, Public Assistance Department, London County Council.
- Harold Bennett Old, Wireless Engineer, Nottingham City Police.
- George Peebles, Detective Superintendent, Edinburgh City Police Force.
- Egbert Thomas Rose, Lately Chief Superintendent, Publication Division, Ordnance Survey Department, Southampton.
- Frederick Claude Routly, Staff Officer, Civil Engineer-in-Chief's Department, Admiralty.
- George Sadler, Founder of the Nottingham Cripples Guild.
- Ethel Bruce Sainsbury, Officer on special duty, India Office.
- Rose Scamell. For political and public services in Salisbury.
- William Norman Settle, Regional Executive, Welsh Region, British Broadcasting Corporation.
- Edward James Slater, Staff Clerk, Board of Education.
- Edgar William Bertram Clayton-Smith, Divisional Insurance Officer, London Division, Ministry of Labour.
- John Hunter Smith, MC Principal, Oaklands Farm Institute, and Agricultural Organiser for Hertfordshire.
- Captain William Herbert Rawdon Smith, Chief Area Officer, Ministry of Pensions.
- Councillor John Staton Speakman, Chairman of. Eccles Local Employment. Committee.
- Ethel Stewart. For political and public services in Newcastle upon Tyne.
- Frederick Arthur Strike, Chief Clerk, Marylebone County Court.
- Seddie Symons, Staff Officer, Grade II, Ministry of Transport.
- Ethel Mary Wallis, Chief Superintendent of Typists, Colonial and Dominions Office.
- Captain Robert George Edmund Whitney, Commandant, Metropolitan. Special Constabulary.
- Ernest Whone, Sanitary Inspector, Cowbridge Rural District.
- Major John David Bell Whyte, Command Land Agent, Eastern Command, War Office.
- Rhys Williams, H.M. Sub-Inspector of Quarries, Mines Department.
- Thomas Kinnier Wilson, Senior Chief Clerk, Board of Customs and Excise.

Overseas Residents

- Louis Gerald Baylis, British Vice-Consul at Hamburg.
- David Norman Crane, Assistant to the Commercial Secretary at His Majesty's Legation at Oslo.
- Donald Arthur Thomas Lee, employed at His Majesty's Consulate-General at Addis Ababa.
- Beatrice Florens Leslie, Clerical Officer at His Majesty's Embassy in China.
- Eleonora Shirley MacKenzie, Archivist at His Majesty's Legation at Havana.
- Captain Albert Ernest Brooks Stone, until recently an acting King's Messenger.
- George Baron Taylor, Archivist at His Majesty's Legation at Vienna.

India and Burma

- Mona Hensman (wife of H. S. Hensman, OBE retired Superintendent of Government Mental Hospital, Madras).
- Akberally Abdulhusain Rasulji, British Indian resident in Addis Ababa.
- Sardar Bahadur Beant Singh, Special Counsel for the Government of India in the Defence Department.
- John Martin Casey, Planter, Orissa.
- Surendra Nath Chakravarti, Indian Service of Engineers, Municipal Engineer, Delhi.
- Percival John Cochrane, Honorary Magistrate, Kurseong, Bengal.
- Rai Bahadur Hiralal Datta, Superintendent, Office of the Military Secretary to the Governor of Bengal, Bengal.
- Manikkam Durai Raj David, FRCSE Third Surgeon, General Hospital, Rangoon, and Police Surgeon, Rangoon, Burma.
- George Walker Hunter, Member of the China Inland Mission in the Consular District of Sinkiang.
- Ira Karney, Superintendent, Central Jail, Trichinopoly, Madras.
- Denis Francis Keegan, Imperial Customs Service, Assistant Collector, Sind.
- Robert Mclntosh, Indian Service of Engineers, Executive Engineer, Public Works Department, Madras.
- Tarak Nath Mukerjee, Chairman, District Board, Hooghly, Bengal.
- Ratanshah Ardeshir Nariman, Merchant, Bareilly, United Provinces.
- Rao Saheb Shantaram Sakharam Parulkar, Pleader and Member, District Board, Satara, Bombay.
- Walter Edward Pereira, Bombay Forest Service, Personal Assistant to the Chief Conservator of Forests, Bombay Presidency, Bombay.
- Major Henry Cecil Phillips, Indian Medical Department, Superintendent of the Punjab Vaccine Institute, Lahore, Punjab.
- Khan Bahadur Rahmat Ullah, Assistant Engineer, Military Engineering Service, North-West Frontier Province.
- Frank Robinson, Deputy Superintendent, Bhagalpur Jail, Bihar.
- Harry Royal, VD Assistant Secretary, Bombay Chamber of Commerce, Bombay.
- Khan Bahadur Sultan Muhammad Khan, Provincial Civil Service, Indian Personal Assistant to the Governor of the North-West Frontier Province.
- Rai Bahadur Kunwar Sultan Singh, Zamindar of Lakhnau, Aligarh District, United Provinces.
- Arthur Reginald Tooke, Officer Supervisor, Headquarters, Royal Air Force, India.
- Chumlal Varchand, British Indian resident in Addis Ababa.
- Henry Charles Webster, Ferry Superintendent, East Indian Railway, Bengal.

Colonies, Protectorates, etc.

- Richard Brown, formerly Secretary, Wellington Hospital Board, Dominion of New Zealand.
- Agnes Caroline Clarke, Matron of the Women's Hospital, Sydney, State of New South Wales.
- Martin Gilbert Dalton, Master Mariner. Member of the St. John's Harbour and Pilotage Commission, Newfoundland.
- William Fraser Donald, FCS For services to ex-servicemen and their dependents in the State of New South Wales.
- William Groom. For public and social welfare services in the Commonwealth of Australia.
- Helena Henrietta Constance Hick. For social welfare services in Southern Rhodesia.
- William Henry Lauder, Sub-Treasury Paymaster and Receiver of Public Moneys, Northern Territory, Commonwealth of Australia.
- Stephen Richard Harricks Roberts, DSO VD Deputy Director in Western Australia, Postmaster-General's Department, Commonwealth of Australia.
- William James Sherbon, formerly Chief Clerk, 2nd District Base, Defence Department, Commonwealth of Australia.
- Georgiana Gertrude Smith, Matron of the Western Suburbs Hospital, Sydney, State of New South Wales.
- Harold Archibald Sommerville, Secretary, Auckland Hospital Board, Dominion of New Zealand.
- Louisa Stacey. For social welfare services in Southern Rhodesia.
- Edward Taylor, District Officer, Morobe, New Guinea.
- Walter Cecil Vandenberg. For services to ex-service men and their dependents in the State of New South Wales.
- Phebe Naomi Watson, Honorary General Secretary of the Women's Centenary Council, State of South Australia. On the occasion of the centenary of the State.
- William Shakespeare Wharton, Secretary, North Canterbury Hospital Board, Dominion of New Zealand.
- Joseph Edward Axisa, Deputy Commissioner of Police, Malta.
- George Henry Chaundy, Education Officer, Kenya.
- Samuel Abda Collins, Station Master and Yard Master, Haifa, Palestine.
- Edward Thomas Cosgrove, Assistant Superintendent of Police, Palestine.
- Alexander Epstein, Administrative Officer, Palestine.
- John Emmanuel Forde, lately Superintendent, Alms House, British Guiana.
- Albert Fry, DCM MM lately Government Pharmacist, British Guiana.
- Khan Sahib Hasan Muhammad Salih Ja'far. For public services in the Aden Protectorate.
- Captain Frederick George Lancaster, Detective Inspector, Bahamas.
- Nina Hope Lochhead. For charitable services in Gibraltar.
- Donald Charles MacGillivray, Colonial Administrative Service, Assistant District Officer, Tanganyika Territory.
- Charles Macquarie, Agricultural Surveyor, Medical Department, Tanganyika Territory.
- Arthur FitzGeorge Mapp, Chairman of the Belize Town Board, British Honduras.
- Nariman Dorabji Mehta, Cashier and Accountant, Judicial Department, Kenya.
- Frank Selwood Passingham, Superintendent, Government Printing Office, Cyprus
- Fanny Ada Caroline Peiris. For philanthropic services in Ceylon.
- Badri Prasad, Sub-Assistant Surgeon, Nyasaland Protectorate.
- Peter Awoonor Renner. For public services in the Gold Coast.
- Alfred William Riggs, Assistant Superintendent of Police, Palestine.
- Vena Winifred Ellen Rogers, Superintendent of Midwifery, Government Hospital, Jerusalem.
- Eustace Maxwell Shilstone. For public services in Barbados.
- John Wellesley Steil, Colonial Administrative Service, Assistant District Officer, Uganda Protectorate.
- Reginald William Craig Tout, Inspector, Department of Posts and Telegraphs, Palestine.
- Evan McLaren Watson, Superintending Inspector of Produce, Nigeria.
- John Murchie Wilson, Comptroller of Customs, Fiji.

Honorary Members

- Kalman Jacob Cohen, Assistant Superintendent of Police, Palestine.
- Farid Ibrahim Haddad, Inspector of Pharmacies, Palestine.
- Shabetay Levy. For public services in Palestine.
- Azmi Nashashibi, Administrative Officer, Palestine.
- Martin Luther Nsibirwa, Katikiro of Buganda, Uganda Protectorate.
- Jamal Abdul Razzaq Tukan, Administrative Officer, Palestine.

=== Kaisar-i-Hind Medal ===
First Class + Bar

- Louisa Helena Hart, Medical Missionary, Madanapalle, Chittoor District, Madras.

First Class

- Hattie Betteridge, lately Superintending Missionary of the Zenana Bible and Medical Mission, Bombay.
- Norah Hill, ARRC Organising Secretary, Indian Red Cross Society and General Secretary, St. John Ambulance Association, Indian Council.
- Joyce, Lady Keane (wife of Sir Michael Keane, Governor of Assam).
- Pamela Margaret Anstice Stent (wife of P. J. H. Stent, Commissioner, Nagpur Division, Central Provinces).
- Shrimati Tarabai Rani Saheb Bhonsle, Rani Regent of Akalkot State, Deccan States.
- Ramniwas Bagla, President, Municipal Committee, Moulmein, Burma.
- The Reverend Arthur Lyle Bradbury, OBE Manager, Criminal Tribes Settlement, Hubli, Bombay.
- Braja Kanta Guha, Indian Civil Service, District and Sessions Judge, Birbhum, Bengal.
- Lieutenant-Colonel George McGregor Millar, OBE Indian Medical Service (retired), Director, Medical Services, Jammu and Kashmir State.
- The Reverend Charles Henry Monahan, Chairman and General Superintendent, Methodist Missionary Society, Madras.

=== Air Force Cross ===
- Squadron Leader Francis Ronald Downs Swain
- Flight Lieutenant Victor George Aidan
- Flight Lieutenant John Rene Whitley Hatcher
- Flight Lieutenant Harry Broadhurst
- Flight Lieutenant Henry Paterson Fraser
- Flying Officer (Hon. Flight Lieutenant) Cyril Frank Uwins (Reserve of Air Force Officers)

Australia

- Flight Lieutenant Robert Henry Simms, RAAF

=== Air Force Medal ===
- 506143 Sergeant Leonard Cecil Lambert.

=== King's Police Medal ===
For Gallantry

England and Wales

- Joseph Henry Hood, lately Constable, Metropolitan Police Force.
- Reginald Ernest Ralph Mounce, Constable, Metropolitan Police Force.
- Lawrence Austin Perigo, Constable, Metropolitan Police Force.
- James Trott Bell, Constable, Lancashire Constabulary.
- Ellis Edward Moss, Constable, Denbighshire Constabulary
- Chris Bostock, Constable, Birkenhead Borough Police Force.
- Harry Broadbent, Constable, Boston Borough Police Force.
- Lionel Philip Rands, Constable, Boston Borough Police Force.
- William Anderson Crompton, Constable, Salford City Police Force.

Scotland

- Philip Melville, Constable, Glasgow City Police Force.

Australia

- Hector Charles Vincent Archinal, Constable, New South Wales Police.
- Jack Terbutt, Constable, New South Wales Police.
- Thomas William Lloyd Shipton, Constable, New South Wales Police.
- Edwin Charles Beetham, Constable, Queensland Police.
- George Gladstone Aylett, Trooper, Tasmanian Police.

India

- Mumtaz Ali Khan, Sub-Inspector, United Provinces Police.
- Rai Bahadur Shiam Singh. Indian Police, United Provinces.
- Razi Uddin, Constable, United Provinces Police.
- Henry Donald Mortimer Scott, Indian Police, Punjab.

Colonies, Protectorates and Mandated Territories

- James Herbert Harvey Clark, Inspector of Police, Jamaica. (Bar to the King's Medal)
- Thalahitiyagamarallagey Thethonis Appu, Constable, Ceylon Police.
- Anandan Nayar, late Constable, Madras Police. (posthumous)
- M. R. Ry. Chelamalasetti Venkata Subbayya Nayudu, late Sub-Inspector, Madras Police. (posthumous)
- Krishna Vishram Sawant, late Constable, Bombay Police. (posthumous)
- Nathekhan Bhaikhan, late Constable. Bombay Police. Gilbert Wheeler Cole, late Indian Police, United Provinces. (posthumous)
- Mir Zaman Yusafzai, late Subedaf, Frontier Constabulary, North-West Frontier Province Police. (posthumous)

For Distinguished Service

England and Wales

- Major Jack Becke, OBE Chief Constable, Cheshire Constabulary.
- Thomas Rawson, Chief Constable, Bradford City Police Force.
- James Pool Ker Watson, Chief Constable, Preston Borough Police Force.
- Walter Wilson Thornton, Chief Superintendent, Lancashire Constabulary.
- David Leslie, Chief Superintendent, Liverpool City Police Force.
- Stanley George Woodeson, Superintendent, Norfolk. Constabulary
- George Thornton, Superintendent, North Riding of Yorkshire Constabulary.
- Frederick Ralph Williams, Superintendent, Manchester City Police Force.
- Ernest Lancaster, Chief Inspector, Birmingham City Police Force.

Scotland

- Arthur Johnston Mclntosh, Chief Constable, Dumbarton Constabulary.
- Thomas Crawford, Superintendent, Glasgow City Police Force.

Northern Ireland

- Henry Herbert Davidson, Head Constable, Royal Ulster Constabulary.

Australia

- John Richard Carter, Superintendent, 1st Class, New South Wales Police.
- Thomas Joseph Lynch, Superintendent, 1st Class and Deputy Commissioner, New South Wales Police
- Osborne Holmes Parker, Superintendent, 1st Class, New South Wales Police.
- John Thomas Pattinson, Superintendent, 1st Class, New South Wales Police
- John Thomas Wilkins, Chief Officer, Metropolitan Fire Brigades Board, Melbourne, Victoria.
- Gaiberi, Senior Sergeant, Papua Constabulary.

India

- M. R. Ry. Rao Sahib Poolaricheri Subramanya Ayyar, Jamburamaswami Ayyar, Avl. Deputy Superintendent, Madras Police.
- M. R. Ry. Rao Bahadur Mayavaram Vandirar Japuram Sabhapathi Mudaliyar Vaidyanatha Mudaliyar, Avl. MBE Officiating Deputy Superintendent, Madras Police.
- Saiyid Rahmat-Ul-la Saiyid Usman Sahib Bahadur, Inspector, Madras Police.
- M. R. Ry. Kurapati Venkataramanujam Nayudu Garu, Inspector, Madras Police.
- Norman Percival Arthur Smith, Indian Police, Bombay.
- Surendra Nath Chatarji, Indian Police, Bengal. Abu Hamid Muhammad. Shamsoddoha, Indian Police, Bengal.
- Babu Jamini Mohan Banarji, Officiating Deputy Superintendent, Bengal Police.
- Percy Lancelot Orde, CIE Indian Police. Punjab.
- George Durrant, Indian Police, Punjab.
- Khan Sahib Mirza Mohammed Ata Ullah Khan, Inspector, Punjab Police.
- Archibald Clifford Smith, Indian Police, Burma.
- Sardar Bahadur Partab Singh, IDSM Naib Commandant, Burma Military Police.
- U Than (2), KSM TDM Deputy. Superintendent and Sub-Divisional Police Officer, Burma Police.
- Alakh Kumar Sinha, OBE Indian Police, Bihar.
- Sardar Bahadur Tiku Singh Thapa, Second in Command, Gurkha Military Police, Bihar.
- Rao Bahadur Harishanker Jatashanker Raval, Deputy Superintendent, Western India States Agency Police.

Colonies, Protectorates and Mandated Territories

- Shawki Effendi Fethallah Saad, MBE Assistant Superintendent of Police, Palestine. (Bar to the King's Police Medal)
- Edwin Tongue, lately Assistant Superintendent of Police, Straits Settlements. (Bar to the King's Police Medal)
- Lieutenant-Colonel Harry William Morrey Barnford, CBE MC Inspector General of Police, Gold Coast.
- Philip Norton Banks, Deputy Inspector General of Police, Ceylon.
- Halim Basta, Assistant Superintendent of Police, Palestine.
- Captain Frank Harcourt Bustard, Superintendent of Police, Zanzibar.
- Colonel William Samuel Dickens, MBE Inspector General of Police, Barbados.
- John Alexander Mulloy Faraday, MC Deputy District Superintendent of Police, Palestine.
- Major Gerald Robert Edward Foley, OBE District Superintendent of Police, Palestine.
- William Sutherland Gulloch, Chief of Police, Gibraltar.
- William Cyril Campbell King, Chief Commandant of Police and Inspector of Prisons, Cyprus.

=== Imperial Service Medal ===
- Abdul Wahid, lately Record Sorter in the Foreign and Political Department, Government of India.
- Ghulam Hussain Madar Baksh, lately Jemadar, Indore Residency, Central India.
- Perumal Nayudu Govindaswami Nayudu, lately Jemadar, Office of the Commissioner of Excise, Madras.
- Raghunandan Singh, lately Peon in the Foreign and Political Department, Government of India.
- Rahimtoola Mangroo, lately Postman, Posts and Telegraphs Department, Aden Camp Sub-Office.
- Ram Khilawan Singh, lately Jemadar in the Foreign and Political Department, Government of India.
- Shanker, lately Jemadar, Government Telegraph Office, Rawalpindi.

=== British Empire Medal ===
Military Division

For Gallantry

- Private Frank Naughton, 10th Light Tank Company, Royal Tank Corps.

For Meritorious Service

- Sergeant George Abbott, Royal Army Service Corps.
- Company Quartermaster-Sergeant Stanley Boudeville, Selangor Battalion, Federated Malay States Volunteer Force.
- Transport-Sergeant John Joseph Marshall, 7th (Blythswood) Battalion, The Highland Light Infantry (City of Glasgow Regiment).
- Sergeant Edward John Newmarsh, Royal Corps of Signals.
- Sergeant John Alexander Simpson, Royal Army Service Corps.
- Leading Aircraftman Harold Edgar Gundry, Royal Air Force.

Civil Division

For Gallantry

- Charles Godfrey Duffin, Senior Shipwright Diver, H.M. Dockyard, Portsmouth.
- Adrian Sidney Gilbert Reginald Trapman, Vice-Consul at Addis Ababa.
- George John Adamson, Inspector, River Traffic Police, Calcutta, Bengal,
- Cecil Francis Kelly, Assistant River Surveyor, Port Commissioners, Calcutta, Bengal.
- Ashraf-un-Nisa Begum, Hyderabad, Deccan.

For Meritorious Service

- Alfred Adamson, Special Leading Factory Hand, Royal Arsenal, Woolwich.
- George Frederick Edginton, Supervising Part-time Night Telephonist, Salisbury, General Post Office.
- Harry Rowland Gann, Assistant Superintendent, Leeds Post Office.
- William Jeffrey Graham, Chief Officer (Class I), H.M. Borstal Institution, Portland.
- William Hastie, Aldershot. For services at the Aldershot Tattoo.
- Oliff Mary Low, Sorting Clerk and Telegraphist, Newbury, General Post Office.
- Bertie Rogers, Head Gardener and Caretaker, Imperial War Graves Commission, Belgium.
- William Alfred Smith, Head Postman, Kidderminster, General Post Office.
- William John Tapling, Sorting Clerk and Telegraphist, Liverpool, General Post Office.
- Samuel John Warsap, Artificer, National Physical Laboratory, Department of Scientific and Industrial Research.
- Hilda Wormald, Supervisor, London Telephone Service.
- Mohammed Ehsan Ul Hack. For services in Addis Ababa.
- Gerald Latham, Member of the R.S.PCA. Silver Star Abyssinian Veterinary Unit. For services in Addis Ababa.
- Said Mohammed Mahdar. For services in Addis Ababa.
- William Charles Grant, lately Line Inspector, Postmaster General's Department, Western Australia.
- Walter Watson, lately Foreman Mechanic, Engineering Branch, Postmaster General's Department, Sydney.
- Andrew William Clow, Acting British Inspector, Palestine Police.
- George Ritchie Gibson, Corporal, Palestine Police.
- Harry Gerard Gordon Goddard, Temporary Acting Assistant Superintendent, Palestine Police.
- Henry Clare Kemp, Sergeant, Palestine Police.
- Eric William Medlock, Mounted Sergeant, Palestine Police.
- Geoffrey Jackson Morton, Temporary Acting British Inspector, Palestine Police.
- Thomas Albert Nichols, Sergeant, Palestine Police.
- George Frederick Ring, Inspector, Palestine Police.
- Suleiman Daoud Faddah, Lineman, Posts and Telegraphs Department, Palestine.
- Munir Effendi Abu Fadel, Sub-Inspector, Palestine Police.
- Salem Kirry, Station Master, Palestine Railways, Tulkarm.
- Isaac Rabinowitz. For conspicuous bravery on several occasions while transporting troops under fire in Palestine.
- Mohammad Saadi Shaheen, First Inspector, Palestine Police Force.
- Eliezer Sklartz, Supernumerary Policeman, Palestine.
- Percy Mortimer de Fontaine, Taxidermist, Raffles Museum and Library, Singapore.
- Samuel Ramaswamy Saravanamuttu, Senior Lecturer, Police Training School, Ceylon.

=== Royal Red Cross ===
First Class

- Evelyn Bertram Levay, Matron, Queen Alexandra's Imperial Military Nursing Service, in recognition of the exceptional devotion and competency displayed by her in the performance of her nursing duties in Military Hospitals.
- Evelyn Moriarty, Lady Superintendent, Queen Alexandra's Military Nursing Service for India, in recognition of the exceptional devotion and competency displayed by her in the performance of her nursing duties in India.

Second Class

- Superintending Sister Doris Winifred Beale, Queen Alexandra's Royal Naval Nursing Service.
