= Mary Daly (disambiguation) =

Mary Daly (1928–2010) was an American feminist theologian and academic.

Mary Daly may also refer to:

- Mary C. Daly (born 1962/1963), American economist
- Mary Daly (Australian writer) (1896–1983), Australian author, humanitarian and charity worker
- Mary Daly (sociologist), Irish sociologist and academic
- Mary E. Daly, Irish historian and academic
