= Edwin Charles Cox =

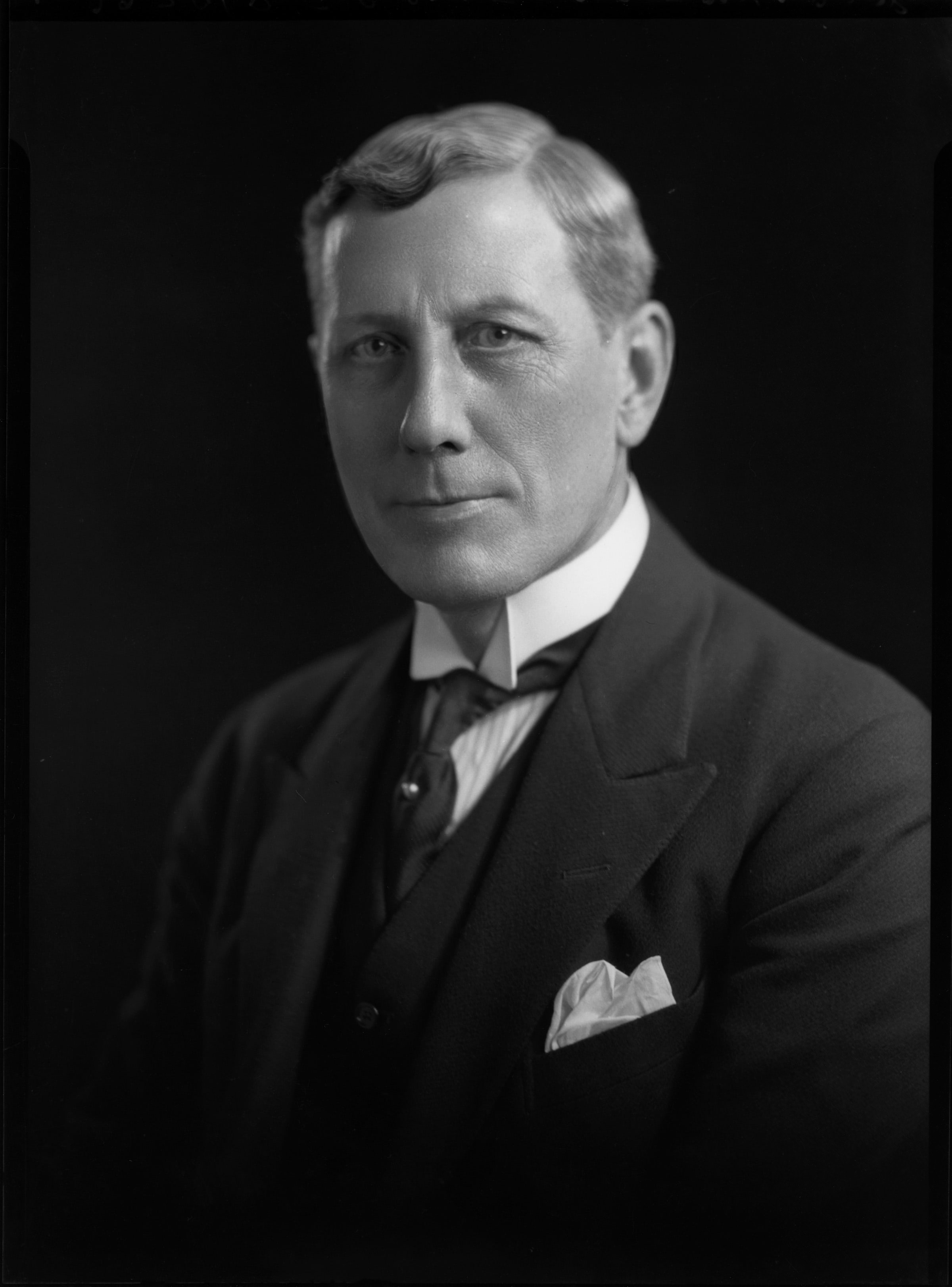
Cox in 1928

Edwin Charles Cox CVO CBE TD (3 January 1868 – 9 December 1958) was a British soldier and railway manager.

He was Traffic Manager, of the Southern Railway from 1930–1936.

He was also a Lt Col. in the Engineer and Railway Staff Corps.

He was appointed a Commander of the Order of the British Empire (CBE) in the 1918 New Year Honours, a Member (4th class) of the Royal Victorian Order (MVO) in the 1926 Birthday Honours, and promoted to Commander of the Order (CVO) in the 1937 New Year Honours. He was awarded the Efficiency Decoration (TD) in 1932.
