= New South Wales Legislative Assembly =

Lower house of the Parliament of New South Wales

Legislative Assembly
- 58th Parliament

Type
- Type: Lower house of the Parliament of New South Wales

History
- Founded: 22 May 1856; 170 years ago

Leadership
- Speaker: Greg Piper, Independent since 9 May 2023
- Deputy Speaker: Sonia Hornery, Labor since 9 May 2023
- Leader of the House: Ron Hoenig, Labor since 5 April 2023
- Government Whip: Nathan Hagarty, Labor since 17 October 2023
- Deputy Government Whip: Liesl Tesch, Labor since 18 March 2025
- Manager of Opposition Business: Alister Henskens, Liberal since 3 May 2023
- Opposition Whip: Adam Crouch, Liberal since 21 April 2023

Structure
- Seats: 93
- Political groups: Government (46): Labor (46); Opposition (35): Liberal (24); Nationals (11); Crossbench (12): Greens (3); Independent (9) (Note: Current independent MLAs: Roy Butler (Barwon), Helen Dalton (Murray), Phil Donato (Orange), Alex Greenwich (Sydney), Judy Hannan (Wollondilly), Joe McGirr (Wagga Wagga), Greg Piper (Lake Macquarie), Michael Regan (Wakehurst) and Jacqui Scruby (Pittwater))
- Length of term: 4 years

Elections
- Voting system: Optional preferential voting
- Last election: 25 March 2023
- Next election: 13 March 2027

Meeting place
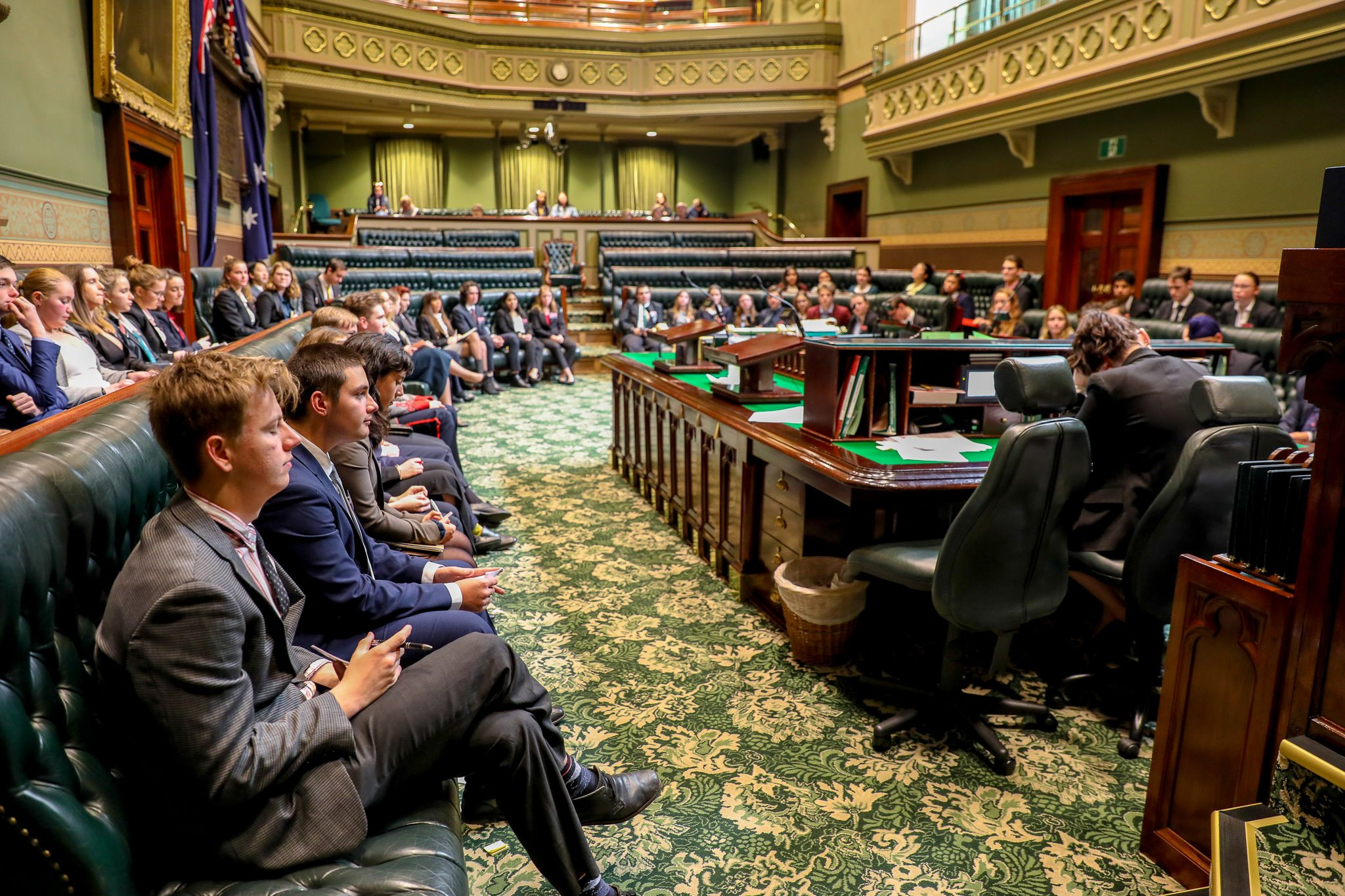
- Legislative Assembly Chamber; Parliament House, Sydney, New South Wales, Australia

Website
- NSW Legislative Assembly

The New South Wales Legislative Assembly is the lower of the two houses of the Parliament of New South Wales, an Australian state. The upper house is the New South Wales Legislative Council. Both the Assembly and Council sit at Parliament House in the state capital, Sydney. The Assembly is presided over by the Speaker of the Legislative Assembly.

The Assembly has 93 members, elected by single-member constituency, which are commonly known as seats. Voting is by the optional preferential system.

Members of the Legislative Assembly have the post-nominals MP after their names. From the creation of the assembly up to about 1990, the post-nominals "MLA" (Member of the Legislative Assembly) were used.

The Assembly is often called the bearpit on the basis of the house's reputation for confrontational style during heated moments and the "savage political theatre and the bloodlust of its professional players" attributed in part to executive dominance.

== History ==
The Legislative Assembly was created in 1856 with the introduction of a bicameral parliament for the Crown Colony of New South Wales, a process led in the Legislative Council by William Charles Wentworth. In the beginning, only men were eligible to be members of the Assembly, and only around one half of men were able to pass the property or income qualifications required to vote. Two years later, the Electoral Reform Act, which was passed despite the opposition of the Legislative Council, saw the introduction of a far more democratic system, allowing any man who had been resident in the colony for six months the right to vote, and removing property requirements to stand as a candidate. Following Australia's federation in 1901, the New South Wales parliament became a State legislature. Women were granted the right to vote in 1902, and gained the right to be members of the Assembly in 1918, with the first successful candidate being elected in 1925.

== Chamber ==
The Legislative Assembly sits in the oldest legislative chamber in Australia. Originally built for the Legislative Council in 1843, it has been in continuous use since 1856. The colour of the Legislative Assembly chamber is green, which follows the British tradition for lower houses.

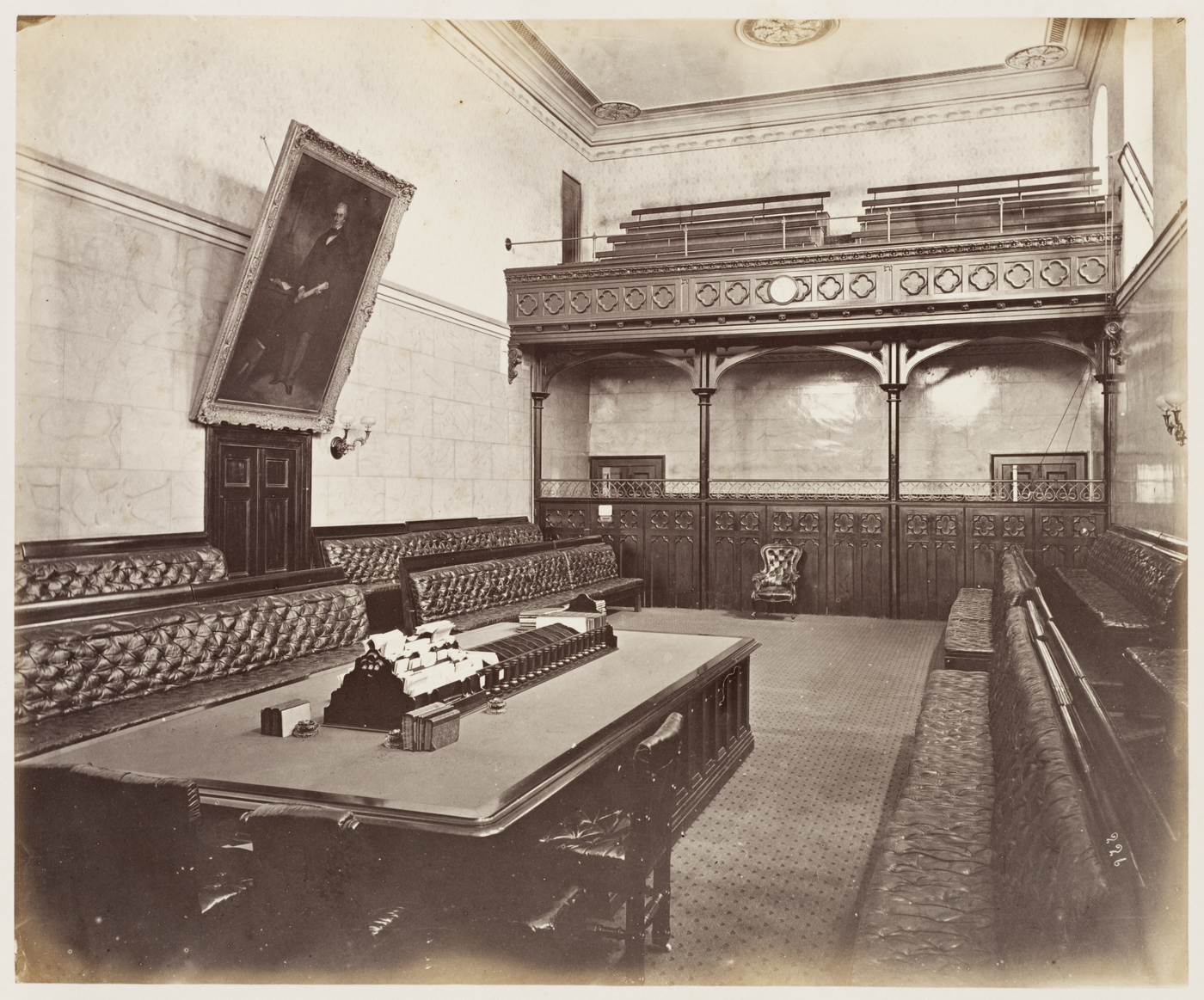
The Legislative Assembly chamber in 1872, with a portrait of William Charles Wentworth on the left.

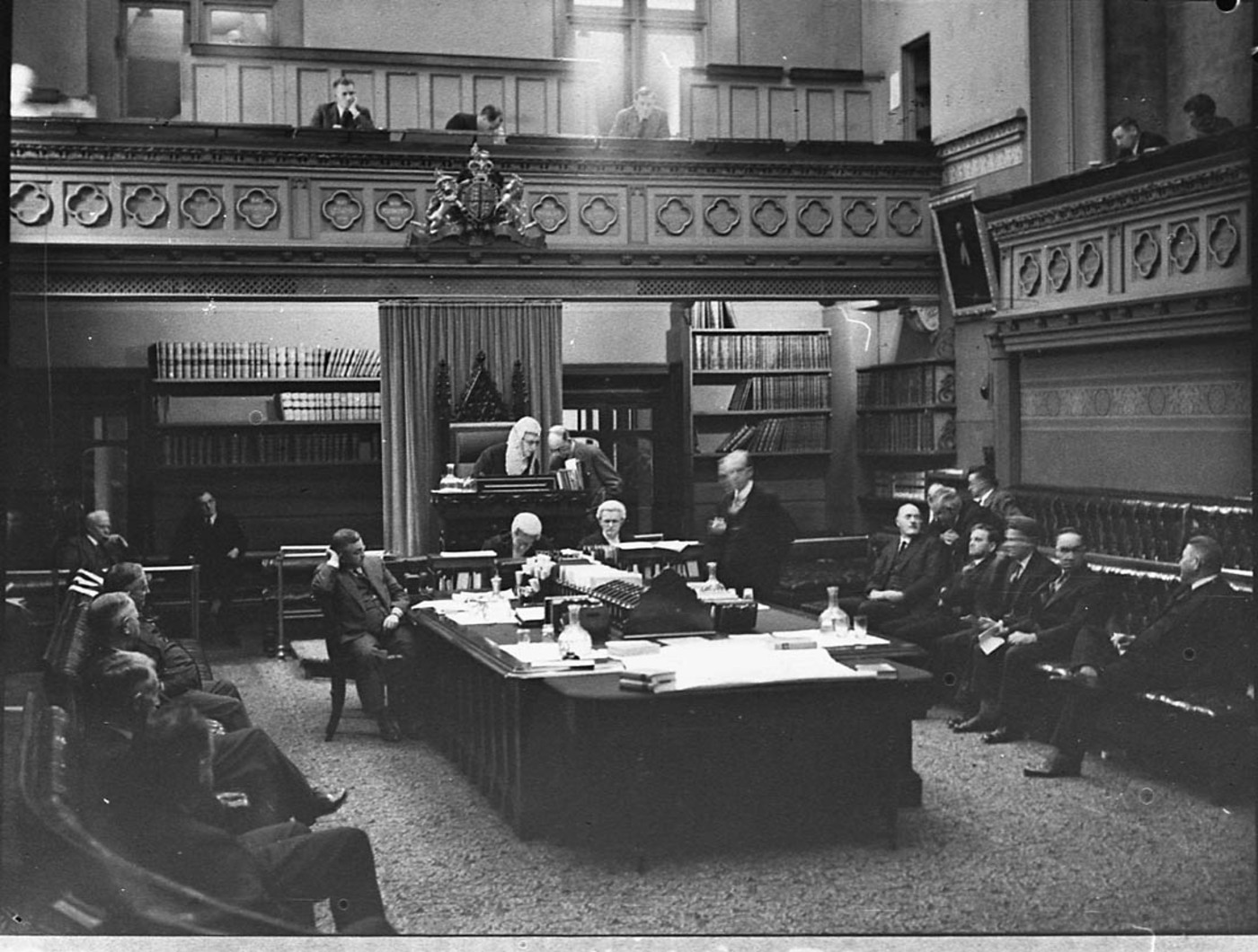
The Legislative Assembly chamber during debate on the Greater Newcastle Bill, 19 November 1937; Speaker Reginald Weaver presiding with the Member for Newcastle, Frank Hawkins speaking.

Since 2010 the Aboriginal Flag has hung next to the NSW state flag in the NSW Legislative Assembly and the Australian National Flag has hung in the Assembly Chamber since 2013.

== Function ==
Most legislation is initiated in the Legislative Assembly. The party or coalition with a majority of seats in the lower house is invited by the Governor to form government. The leader of that party subsequently becomes Premier of New South Wales, and their senior colleagues become ministers responsible for various portfolios. As Australian political parties traditionally vote along party lines, most legislation introduced by the governing party will pass through the Legislative Assembly.

As with the federal parliament and other Australian states and territories, voting in the Assembly election is compulsory for all those over the age of 18. Elections are held every four years on the fourth Saturday in March, as the result of a 1995 referendum to amend the New South Wales Constitution. (Note: Between 1984 and 1995, the maximum term of the Assembly was four years, but could be dissolved earlier.) An early election can only be held if the government fails a vote of no confidence and no alternative government can command a vote of confidence. The Legislative Assembly may also be dissolved on the advice of the Premier or the Executive Council.

== Current distribution of seats ==
Party	Seats held	Current Assembly
Labor	46	
Liberal	24	
National	11	
Greens	3	
Independent	9	

- 47 votes as a majority are required to pass legislation.

== Administrative officers ==
=== Clerk ===
The clerk of the house of the NSW Legislative Assembly is the senior administrative officer. The clerk advises the speaker of the Assembly and members of parliament on matters of parliamentary procedure and management. The office is modelled on the clerk of the House of Commons of the United Kingdom. Notable clerks have included William Rupert McCourt and Ivor Vidler

=== Serjeant-at-arms ===
The ceremonial duties of the serjeant-at-arms are as the custodian of the mace, the symbol of the authority of the House and the speaker, and as the messenger for formal messages from the Legislative Assembly to the Legislative Council. The serjeant has the authority to remove disorderly people, by force if necessary, from the Assembly or the public or press galleries on the instructions of the speaker. The administrative duties of the serjeant include allocation of office accommodation, furniture and fittings for members' offices, co-ordination of car transport for members, mail and courier services for the House, security for the House and arrangements for school visits. Once a meeting has started in an Assembly, the serjeant will usually stand at the door to keep authority and make sure no one else comes in or out.

== See also ==
- 2023 New South Wales state election
- List of New South Wales state by-elections
- Parliaments of the Australian states and territories
- Members of the New South Wales Legislative Assembly
- New South Wales Legislative Assembly electoral districts
- Women in the New South Wales Legislative Assembly
