= Albert G. Lee =

British radio pioneer

- Born: 24 May 1879; Conwy, Wales
- Died: 26 August 1967 (aged 88)
- Awards: IEEE Medal of Honor (1939)
- Scientific career
- Fields: Electrical engineering

Lieutenant Colonel Sir Albert George Lee MC (24 May 1879 – 26 August 1967) was a British radio pioneer.

Lee was born in Conwy, Wales, and in 1903 entered the General Post Office Engineering Service, where he designed and tested submarine and other cables. In World War I he served in the Royal Engineers (Signal Service) commanding a telegraph construction company, and later was Officer-in-Charge, General Headquarters Signal Area. In 1920 Lee became involved with radios, and soon became Staff Engineer in charge of the radio section of the General Post Office. He was associated with the development of a coupled circuit arc, the Rugby, Warwickshire high-power station, and the transatlantic telephone and shortwave telephone service.

Lee was a member of the Institution of Electrical Engineers, and chaired its Wireless Section from 1927 to 1928. He was elected a Fellow of the Institute of Radio Engineers in 1929, knighted in the 1937 New Year Honours and awarded the IRE Medal of Honor in 1939 "for his accomplishments in promoting international radio services and in fostering advances in the art and science of radio communication."
