= 1937 New Year Honours (New Zealand) =

Annual awards for New Zealanders

The 1937 New Year Honours in New Zealand were appointments by King George VI to various orders and honours to reward and highlight good works by New Zealanders. The awards celebrated the passing of 1936 and the beginning of 1937. This was the first honours list of George VI's reign, and its announcement was deferred until 1 February 1937.

The recipients of honours are displayed here as they were styled before their new honour.

== Knight Bachelor ==
- George Harper OBE – chairman of the Metropolitan Relief Committee, Christchurch.
- George Alexander Troup CMG – of Wellington. For public services.
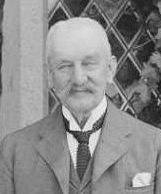
Sir George Harper

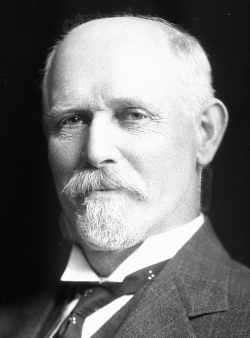
Sir George Troup

== Order of Saint Michael and Saint George ==
=== Companion (CMG) ===
- Professor Hugh Mackenzie MA – foundation professor of English language and literature, Victoria University College, Wellington.

== Order of the British Empire ==
=== Commander (CBE) ===
Civil division

- Joseph William Allan Heenan LLB – of Wellington; under-secretary, Department of Internal Affairs.

Military division

- Captain Llewellyn Vaughan Morgan MVO DSC – Royal Navy; formerly second naval member of the New Zealand Naval Board.

=== Officer (OBE) ===
Civil division

- Anna Elizabeth Jerome Spencer – of Omatua, Rissington, Hawke's Bay; founder of the Women's Institute and the Townswomen's Guild movements in New Zealand. For social-welfare services.
- Eileen May Duggan MA – of Wellington. For contributions to literature.
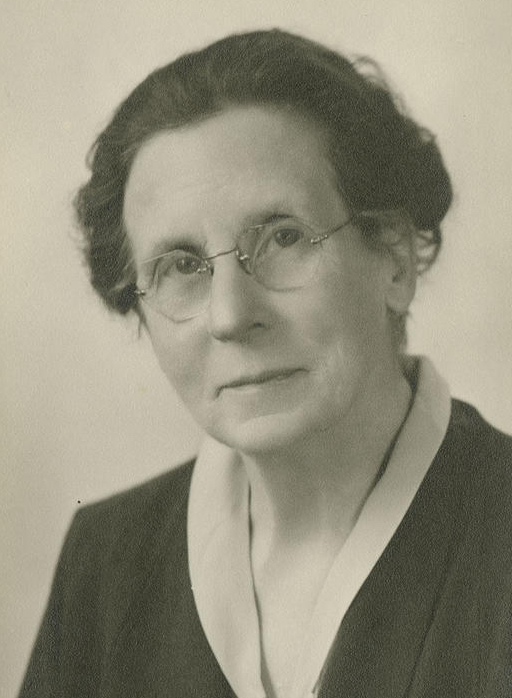
Bessie Spencer

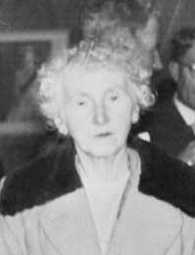
Eileen Duggan

=== Member (MBE) ===
Civil division

- Richard Brown JP – formerly secretary, Wellington Hospital Board.
- Harold Archibald Sommerville – secretary, Auckland Hospital Board.
- William Shakespear Wharton JP – secretary, North Canterbury Hospital Board, Christchurch.
