= Eileen Duggan =

New Zealand poet and writer

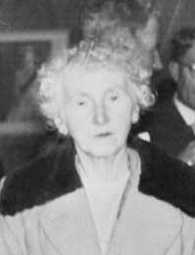
Duggan in 1955

Eileen May Duggan OBE (21 May 1894 – 10 December 1972) was a New Zealand poet and journalist, from an Irish Roman Catholic family. She worked in Wellington as a journalist, and wrote a weekly article for the Catholic weekly The New Zealand Tablet for almost fifty years.

== Early life ==
She was born in Tuamarina near Blenheim in Marlborough, the youngest of four daughters of John and Julia Duggan. They were both from County Kerry, Ireland, and had married in Wellington on 7 October 1885. John was a platelayer on the New Zealand Railways.

She attended Tuamarina School from 1901 to 1910 and Marlborough High School. She taught as a pupil teacher at Tuamarina School from 1912 to 1913, and attended Wellington Teachers Training College from 1914 to 1915. She studied at Victoria University College, Wellington from 1916, receiving a BA in 1916, and a MA with first class honours in history in 1918, and was awarded the Jacob Joseph Scholarship. She taught at Dannevirke High School in 1918, then at Marlborough High School, St Patrick’s College, Wellington, and was an assistant lecturer at Victoria University College for one year. She was deeply affected by the death of her sister Evelyn in 1921, then by the deaths of her father and mother in quick succession in 1923, and after briefly staying with her other married sister Mary moved about 1925 to the Catholic Girls’ Hostel in Wellington. Her other sister Catherine (or Katherine) had entered the Order of Our Lady of the Missions.

== Later life ==
She had continued ill health from a childhood sickness, so decided to give up teaching. Partly for the same reason she decided not to marry in 1918 and in 1940. She supported herself by journalism, with a weekly article in The New Zealand Tablet, writing the women's page under the pen name of Pippa. The first article appeared in the issue of 7 September 1927, and the last posthumously on 17 January 1973. She also wrote items for newspapers like The Dominion of Wellington. She lived in early 1950s in inner-city Wellington in Glencoe Terrace off The Terrace, in a weird canyon in the heart of the city up flights of precipitous stairs and, later, in the 1950s, in Imperial Terrace, Kilbirnie.

== Poet ==
Her first poems were published in The New Zealand Tablet in 1917. Soon after her arrival in Wellington she published her first volume in December 1920. Through her career she published individual poems in various newspapers and journals in New Zealand (including the New Zealand School Journal), Australia (The Bulletin), England (The New English Weekly) and America (America and The Commonweal, both Catholic journals). In the 1930s she was New Zealand's best-known poet, with an Eileen Duggan Society in America. Her 1937 volume of poems had an introduction by Walter de la Mare. However, in spite of this, as Dr Peter Whiteford argues, "changes in literary fashion were reaching New Zealand that would ultimately see her marginalized within the literary community." She stopped writing poems (to "have done with words") about 1951 but continued to earn income from her prose for another twenty years. She wrote some poems on events for the Catholic Church, which treated her at times as an unofficial poet laureate, and a poem when Prime Minister Michael Joseph Savage died.

Some of her poems were anthologised in books of New Zealand poems by Chapman, Bennett and Vincent O’Sullivan, but none of her poems were included in Allen Curnows influential 1960 Penguin anthology because of a disagreement over selection of them. Her reputation declined after her death, from her association with the English Georgian poets and with the inclusion of some of her poems in the 1930 anthology Kowhai Gold which was rather self-consciously New Zealand.

In the 1937 New Year Honours, Duggan was appointed an Officer of the Order of the British Empire, for contributions to literature in New Zealand, one of the first writers to be so honoured. In 1942 Prime Minister Peter Fraser who was a personal friend got her a small pension.

== Publications ==
=== Poems ===
- Poems (1921)
- New Zealand Bird Songs (1929) described by her as rhymes for children
- Poems (1937, American edition 1938 & enlarged edition 1939)
- New Zealand Poems (1940)
- More Poems (1951)
- Eileen Duggan: Selected Poems edited by Peter Whiteford (1994, Victoria University Press, Wellington) ISBN 0-86473-265-1

=== Biographical ===
- A Gentle Poet: A portrait of Eileen Duggan O.B.E. by Grace Burgess (1981)
- A New Zealand Poet for the World in Great Days in New Zealand Writing by Alan Mulgan Chapter 10, pages 90–94 (1962, Reed)
