= William Rupert McCourt =

Australian public servant

William McCourt CMG

Clerk of the New South Wales Legislative Assembly.
- In office 1930–1947

Personal details
- Born: William Rupert McCourt; 1884 Moss Vale, New South Wales
- Died: 1947 (aged 62–63) Vaucluse, New South Wales
- Education: Newington College
- Occupation: Public servant

Military service
- Allegiance: Australia
- Branch/service: Australian Army
- Years of service: World War I
- Rank: Lieutenant

William Rupert McCourt CMG (1884 – 17 February 1947) was an Australian public servant who served as Clerk of the New South Wales Legislative Assembly.

== Family and education ==
McCourt was born in Moss Vale, New South Wales the son of William McCourt MLA (1851–1913), a former Speaker of the NSW Legislative Assembly. He was educated at Newington College in Sydney from 1899 until 1901.

== Public and war service ==
Upon leaving school in 1901, McCourt joined the staff of the Parliament of New South Wales and served in a number of positions before serving as Clerk of the NSW Legislative Assembly from 1930 until 1947. He served as a Lieutenant in World War I and at war's end he and the then second clerk of the Assembly were seconded to the staff of the House of Commons of the United Kingdom for some months.

== Honours and travel ==
McCourt was made a Companion of the Order of St Michael and St George in 1937 in recognition of his services to the New South Wales Parliament. In that year he officially attended the Coronation of King George VI in London.
