= Bessie Spencer =

New Zealand educator, orchardist and community leader (1872–1955

Bessie Spencer OBE
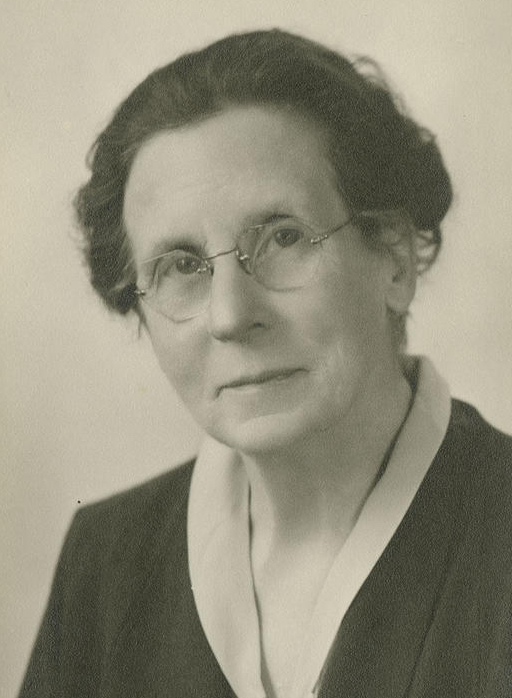
- Spencer in 1945
- Born: Anna Elizabeth Jerome Spencer; 16 November 1872; Napier, New Zealand
- Died: 23 October 1955 (aged 82); Napier, New Zealand
- Occupations: School principal; orchardist; community leader
- Known for: Founder of the New Zealand Federation of Women's Institutes

Anna Elizabeth Jerome Spencer OBE (16 November 1872 – 23 October 1955) was a notable New Zealand school principal, orchardist and community leader. She was born in Napier, New Zealand, in 1872.

Spencer founded the New Zealand Federation of Women's Institutes in 1921, being inspired to do so after attending a craft exhibition in London in 1919.

In the 1937 New Year Honours, Spencer was appointed an Officer of the Order of the British Empire, for social welfare services.

In February 2021 a bronze statue of Spencer was unveiled in Napier.
