= Joe Heenan =

New Zealand public servant and writer

Sir Joseph William Allan Heenan KBE (17 January 1888 – 11 October 1951) was a New Zealand law draftsman, senior public servant, administrator and writer. He was born in Greymouth, New Zealand, on 17 January 1888.

Heenan was awarded the King George V Silver Jubilee Medal in 1935. In the 1937 New Year Honours, he was appointed a Commander of the Order of the British Empire, and the 1949 King's Birthday Honours, he was promoted to Knight Commander of the Order of the British Empire, in recognition of his service as under-secretary of Internal Affairs.
