= P. Raghavendra Rau =

Indian banker

Sir Panambur Raghavendra Rau, IAAS (24 May 1889 – 23 January 1942) was an Indian civil servant.

He was born in Panambur in 1889. He studied at Kundapur High School where he won the M.R.R.Y. Medal for standing first in the Presidency Matriculation Examination in 1904. In 1907, he graduated from Madras Christian College, in which he stood first in all the examinations at the university level, winning the prestigious Gunn Medal.

He joined the Indian Audits and Accounts Service in 1912. He was successively the Assistant Controller of Currency, Assistant Secretary and Under Secretary, Finance Department, Government of India, Assistant Secretary, Lee Commission, and deputy director of Finance, Railway Board. As budget officer and secretary, Public Accounts Committee, he was also the treasurer of Delhi University. He served as Financial Commissioner for the Accounts Service on the Indian Railways between 1932 and 1937, and was the first Indian to hold this post. He served as Accountant-General, Bombay, as government director on the Central Board of the Reserve Bank of India and finally as Additional Secretary of the Finance Department at the Government of India until his death. He was also the first Indian to hold this post.

He was knighted in 1937. Sir P Raghavendra Rau was also the first Indian to sign the one-rupee note but it never went into circulation because he died in 1942 from diabetes before he officially became finance secretary.
