= Bernard William Gilbert =

British civil servant

Sir Bernard William Gilbert, GCB, KBE (1891 – 7 November 1957) was a British civil servant who served as Joint Secretary in HM Treasury from 1944 to 1956.

Born in Nottingham, the son of a hosiery warehouseman, Gilbert was educated at Nottingham High School and St John's College, Cambridge. He joined HM Treasury in 1914, but his career was interrupted by military service during the First World War, during which he served with the Royal Horse Artillery and Royal Garrison Artillery.
