= Arthur Hutchinson (civil servant) =

Sir Arthur Sydney Hutchinson KBE CB CVO (21 March 1896 – 18 January 1981) was a British soldier and civil servant. He was the son of Sir Sydney Hutchinson.

He was awarded the CVO in 1937, the CB 1946; and knighted (KBE) in 1953.
