= Mary Daly (Australian writer) =

Australian writer and humanitarian (1896–1983)

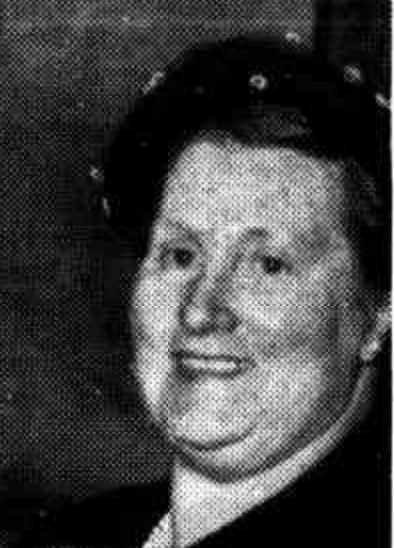
- Born: 24 August 1896; Electoral district of Cootamundra
- Died: Fitzroy
- Resting place: Melbourne General Cemetery
- Awards: Pro Ecclesia et Pontifice (1952); Officer of the Order of the British Empire (1937); Commander of the Order of the British Empire (1949); Dame Commander of the Order of the British Empire (1951); King George V Silver Jubilee Medal (1935)

Dame Mary Dora Daly, DBE CBE OBE (née MacMahon; 24 August 1896 – 11 June 1983) was an Australian writer, humanitarian and charity worker.

== Biography ==
Mary Dora MacMahon was born in Cootamundra, New South Wales, 24 August 1896. Her parents were Thomas Patrick MacMahon, a solicitor, and his wife Mary Ellen (née O'Donnell). She was educated at Loreto convent schools in Normanhurst, New South Wales and Ballarat, Victoria.

On 3 January 1923, at St Canice's Church, Darlinghurst, she married John Joseph Daly (died 1953), a physician and a nephew of the founder of St Vincent's Hospital, Mother Berchmans Daly. The Dalys had two children, John and Marie.

With the outbreak of World War II, Daly was the only woman on the executive of the Catholic Welfare Organisation, founded in Melbourne in 1939 by Archbishop Mannix. She became the CWO's president two years later, in 1941.

She was also affiliated with:

- Member, National Council, Australian Red Cross Society (ARCS)
- Executive Member, Council of the Victorian Division, ARCS
- Fund-raiser, Caritas Christi Hospice
- First woman president (1966–75), Australian Catholic Relief
- Foundation member (president 1975–77), Ryder-Cheshire Foundation (Australia).

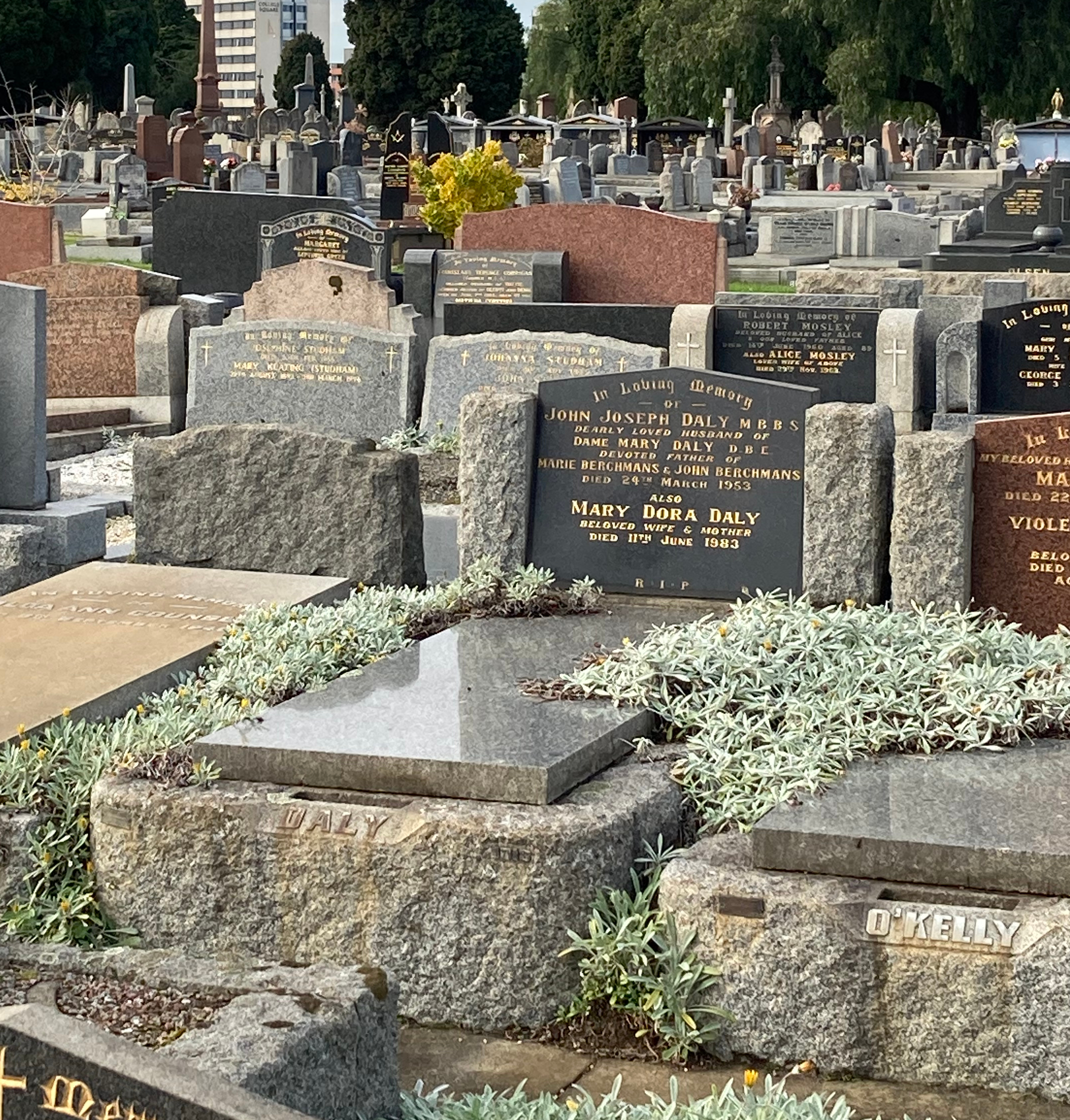
Daly's grave at Melbourne General Cemetery

== Writings ==
- Cinty and the laughing jackasses and other children's stories (1961)
- Timmy's Christmas surprise (1967)
- Holidays at Hillydale: a story for children about a family's holiday spent on an Australian sheep station (1973)
- Catholic Welfare Organisation: its work for the men and women of the Services during World War II, September 1939 - June 1948

== Death ==
Dame Mary Daly died at Fitzroy, Victoria, aged 86, on 11 June 1983. She was buried at Melbourne General Cemetery.

== Honours and awards ==
- King George V Silver Jubilee Medal - 1935.
- Officer of the Order of the British Empire (OBE) - 1937
- Commander of the Order of the British Empire (CBE) - 1949
- Dame Commander of the Order of the British Empire (DBE) - 1951
- The Roman Catholic Church awarded Mary Daly the Cross Pro Ecclesia et Pontifice in 1951, in honour of her work as president of the Catholic Welfare Organization of Victoria.
- Long service medal from the Australian Red Cross Society in 1940 and honorary life membership in 1971.
