= List of Anyphaenidae species =

This page lists all described genera and species of the spider family Anyphaenidae. As of March 2019, the World Spider Catalog accepts 685 species in 56 genera:

== A ==
=== Acanthoceto ===
Acanthoceto Mello-Leitão, 1944

- Acanthoceto acupicta (Nicolet, 1849) (type) — Chile, Argentina, Uruguay, Brazil
- Acanthoceto cinerea (Tullgren, 1901) — Chile, Argentina
- Acanthoceto ladormida Ramírez, 1997 — Chile
- Acanthoceto marina Ramírez, 1997 — Chile
- Acanthoceto pichi Ramírez, 1997 — Chile, Argentina
- Acanthoceto riogrande Ramírez, 1997 — Brazil, Argentina
- Acanthoceto septentrionalis (Berland, 1913) — Colombia, Ecuador

=== Aljassa ===
Aljassa Brescovit, 1997

- Aljassa annulipes (Caporiacco, 1955) (type) — Venezuela
- Aljassa notata (Keyserling, 1881) — Peru
- Aljassa poicila (Chamberlin, 1916) — Peru
- Aljassa subpallida (L. Koch, 1866) — Colombia
- Aljassa venezuelica (Caporiacco, 1955) — Venezuela

=== Amaurobioides ===
Amaurobioides O. Pickard-Cambridge, 1883

- Amaurobioides africana Hewitt, 1917 — Namibia, South Africa
- Amaurobioides chilensis (Nicolet, 1849) — Chile
- Amaurobioides isolata Hirst, 1993 — Australia (South Australia)
- Amaurobioides litoralis Hickman, 1949 — Australia (Tasmania)
- Amaurobioides major Forster, 1970 — New Zealand
- Amaurobioides maritima O. Pickard-Cambridge, 1883 (type) — New Zealand
- Amaurobioides minor Forster, 1970 — New Zealand
- Amaurobioides pallida Forster, 1970 — New Zealand
- Amaurobioides picuna Forster, 1970 — New Zealand
- Amaurobioides piscator Hogg, 1909 — New Zealand (Auckland Is., Campbell Is.)
- Amaurobioides pleta Forster, 1970 — New Zealand
- Amaurobioides pohara Forster, 1970 — New Zealand

=== Anyphaena ===
Anyphaena

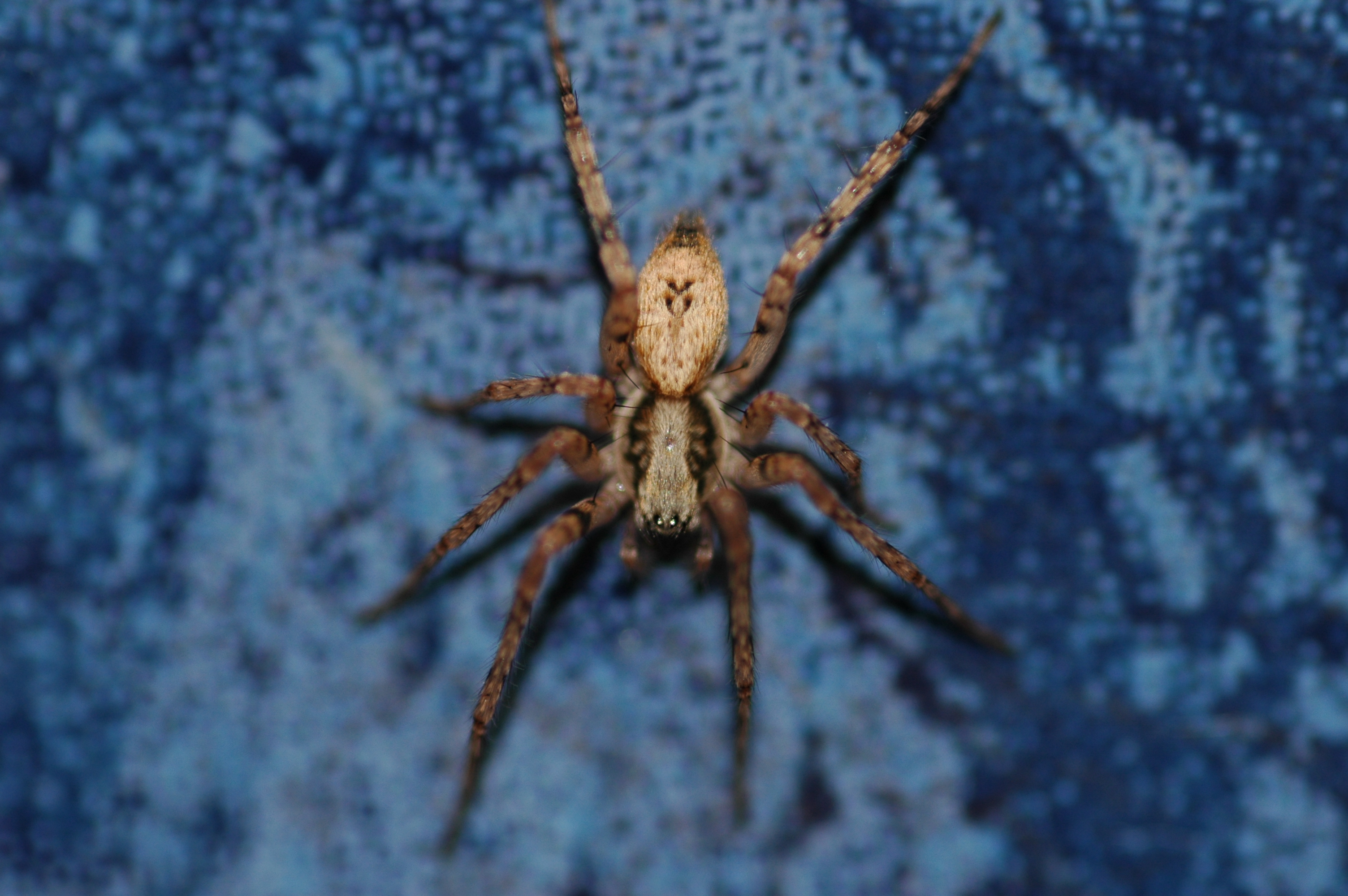
Anyphaena accentuata

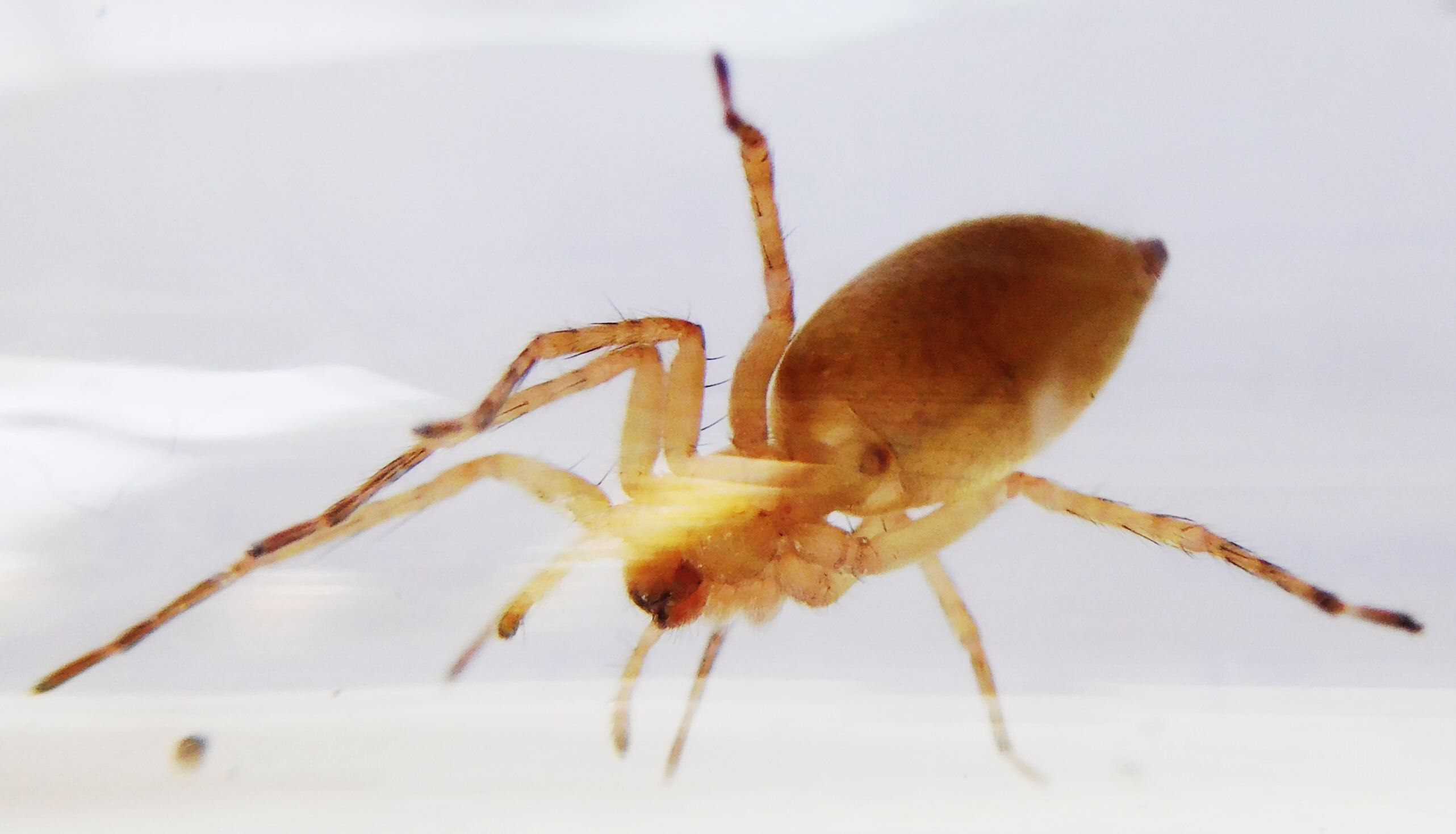
Anyphaena numida

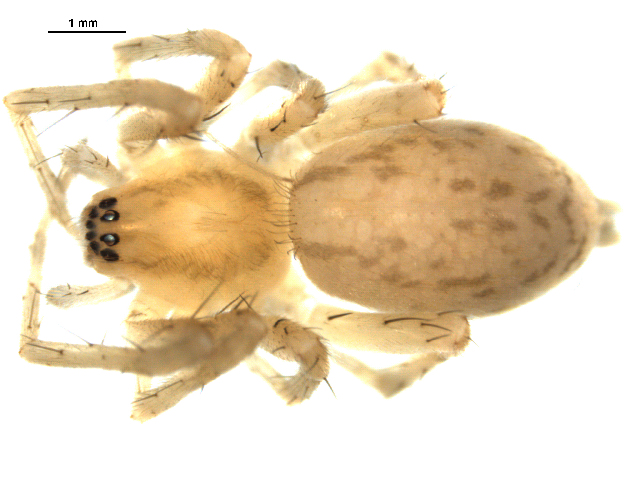
Anyphaena pectorosa

Anyphaena Sundevall, 1833

- Anyphaena accentuata (Walckenaer, 1802) (type) — Europe to Central Asia, Iran
- Anyphaena alachua Platnick, 1974 — USA
- Anyphaena alamos Platnick & Lau, 1975 — Mexico
- Anyphaena alboirrorata Simon, 1878 — Portugal, Spain, France
- Anyphaena andina Chamberlin, 1916 — Peru
- Anyphaena aperta (Banks, 1921) — USA, Canada
- Anyphaena arbida Platnick, 1974 — USA
- Anyphaena autumna Platnick, 1974 — USA
- Anyphaena ayshides Yaginuma, 1958 — Japan
- Anyphaena bermudensis Sierwald, 1988 — Bermuda
- Anyphaena bispinosa Bryant, 1940 — Cuba
- Anyphaena bromelicola Platnick, 1977 — Mexico
- Anyphaena bryantae Roewer, 1951 — Cuba
- Anyphaena californica (Banks, 1904) — USA
- Anyphaena catalina Platnick, 1974 — USA, Mexico
- Anyphaena celer (Hentz, 1847) — USA, Canada
- Anyphaena cielo Platnick & Lau, 1975 — Mexico
- Anyphaena cochise Platnick, 1974 — USA
- Anyphaena cortes Platnick & Lau, 1975 — Mexico
- Anyphaena crebrispina Chamberlin, 1919 — USA
- Anyphaena cumbre Platnick & Lau, 1975 — Mexico
- Anyphaena darlingtoni Bryant, 1940 — Cuba
- Anyphaena decora Bryant, 1942 — Puerto Rico
- Anyphaena diversa Bryant, 1936 — Cuba
- Anyphaena dixiana (Chamberlin & Woodbury, 1929) — USA
- Anyphaena dominicana Roewer, 1951 — Hispaniola
- Anyphaena encino Platnick & Lau, 1975 — Mexico
- Anyphaena felipe Platnick & Lau, 1975 — Mexico
- Anyphaena fraterna (Banks, 1896) — USA
- Anyphaena furcatella Banks, 1914 — Costa Rica
- Anyphaena furva Miller, 1967 — France, Germany, Czech Rep., Slovakia
- Anyphaena gertschi Platnick, 1974 — USA
- Anyphaena gibba O. Pickard-Cambridge, 1896 — Mexico
- Anyphaena gibboides Platnick, 1974 — USA
- Anyphaena gibbosa O. Pickard-Cambridge, 1896 — Mexico
- Anyphaena grovyle Lin & Li, 2021 — China (Hainan)
- Anyphaena hespar Platnick, 1974 — USA, Mexico
- Anyphaena inferens Chamberlin, 1925 — Costa Rica, Panama
- Anyphaena judicata O. Pickard-Cambridge, 1896 — USA to Guatemala
- Anyphaena kurilensis Peelle & Saito, 1932 — Russia (Kurile Is.)
- Anyphaena lacka Platnick, 1974 — USA
- Anyphaena leechi Platnick, 1977 — Mexico
- Anyphaena maculata (Banks, 1896) — USA
- Anyphaena marginalis (Banks, 1901) — USA, Mexico
- Anyphaena modesta Bryant, 1948 — Hispaniola
- Anyphaena mogan Song & Chen, 1987 — China
- Anyphaena mollicoma Keyserling, 1879 — Colombia
- Anyphaena morelia Platnick & Lau, 1975 — Mexico
- Anyphaena nexuosa Chickering, 1940 — Panama
- Anyphaena numida Simon, 1897 — Algeria, Portugal, Spain, France, Britain
- Anyphaena obregon Platnick & Lau, 1975 — Mexico
- Anyphaena otinapa Platnick & Lau, 1975 — Mexico
- Anyphaena pacifica (Banks, 1896) — USA, Canada
- Anyphaena pectorosa L. Koch, 1866 — USA, Canada
- Anyphaena plana F. O. Pickard-Cambridge, 1900 — Panama
- Anyphaena pontica Weiss, 1988 — Romania, Turkey
- Anyphaena pretiosa Banks, 1914 — Costa Rica
- Anyphaena proba O. Pickard-Cambridge, 1896 — Mexico
- Anyphaena pugil Karsch, 1879 — Russia (Sakhalin, Kurile Is.), Korea, Japan
- Anyphaena pusilla Bryant, 1948 — Hispaniola
- Anyphaena quadricornuta Kraus, 1955 — El Salvador
- Anyphaena rhynchophysa Feng, Ma & Yang, 2012 — China
- Anyphaena rita Platnick, 1974 — USA, Mexico
- Anyphaena sabina L. Koch, 1866 — Europe, Turkey, Caucasus
- Anyphaena salto Platnick & Lau, 1975 — Mexico
- Anyphaena sceptile Lin & Li, 2021 — China (Hainan)
- Anyphaena scopulata F. O. Pickard-Cambridge, 1900 — Guatemala
- Anyphaena shenzhen Lin & Li, 2021 — China
- Anyphaena simoni Becker, 1878 — Mexico
- Anyphaena simplex O. Pickard-Cambridge, 1894 — Mexico, Costa Rica
- Anyphaena soricina Simon, 1889 — India
- Anyphaena subgibba O. Pickard-Cambridge, 1896 — Guatemala
- Anyphaena syriaca Kulczyński, 1911 — Lebanon, Israel
- Anyphaena taiwanensis Chen & Huang, 2011 — Taiwan
- Anyphaena tancitaro Platnick & Lau, 1975 — Mexico
- Anyphaena tehuacan Platnick & Lau, 1975 — Mexico
- Anyphaena tibet Lin & Li, 2021 — China
- Anyphaena trifida F. O. Pickard-Cambridge, 1900 — Mexico, Guatemala
- Anyphaena tuberosa F. O. Pickard-Cambridge, 1900 — Guatemala
- Anyphaena wanlessi Platnick & Lau, 1975 — Mexico
- Anyphaena wuyi Zhang, Zhu & Song, 2005 — China, Taiwan
- Anyphaena xochimilco Platnick & Lau, 1975 — Mexico
- Anyphaena yoshitakei Baba & Tanikawa, 2017 — Japan
- Anyphaena zorynae Durán-Barrón, Pérez & Brescovit, 2016 — Mexico
- Anyphaena zuyelenae Durán-Barrón, Pérez & Brescovit, 2016 — Mexico

=== Anyphaenoides ===
Anyphaenoides Berland, 1913

- Anyphaenoides brescoviti Baert, 1995 — Peru
- Anyphaenoides caribensis Martínez, Brescovit & Martinez, 2018 — Colombia
- Anyphaenoides clavipes (Mello-Leitão, 1922) — Brazil, Argentina
- Anyphaenoides cocos Baert, 1995 — Costa Rica (Cocos Is.)
- Anyphaenoides coddingtoni Brescovit, 1998 — Brazil, Bolivia
- Anyphaenoides enigmatica Martínez, Brescovit & Martinez, 2018 — Colombia
- Anyphaenoides foreroi Martínez, Brescovit & Martinez, 2018 — Colombia
- Anyphaenoides hilli Martínez, Brescovit & Martinez, 2018 — Colombia
- Anyphaenoides irusa Brescovit, 1992 — Venezuela, Suriname, Leeward Antilles
- Anyphaenoides katiae Baert, 1995 — Ecuador (Galapagos Is.)
- Anyphaenoides locksae Brescovit & Ramos, 2003 — Brazil
- Anyphaenoides octodentata (Schmidt, 1971) — Venezuela, Ecuador, Peru, Galapagos Is.
- Anyphaenoides pacifica (Banks, 1902) — Trinidad to Chile, Galapagos Is.
- Anyphaenoides placens (O. Pickard-Cambridge, 1896) — Panama, Venezuela
- Anyphaenoides pluridentata Berland, 1913 (type) — Ecuador
- Anyphaenoides samiria Brescovit, 1998 — Peru
- Anyphaenoides sialha Brescovit, 1992 — Peru
- Anyphaenoides sierraensis Martínez, Brescovit & Martinez, 2018 — Colombia
- Anyphaenoides volcan Brescovit, 1998 — Panama
- Anyphaenoides xiboreninho Brescovit, 1998 — Brazil

=== Arachosia ===
Arachosia O. Pickard-Cambridge, 1882

- Arachosia albiventris Mello-Leitão, 1922 — Brazil, Argentina
- Arachosia anyphaenoides O. Pickard-Cambridge, 1882 (type) — Brazil
- Arachosia arachosia Mello-Leitão, 1922 — Venezuela, Brazil
- Arachosia avalosi Rubio & Ramírez, 2015 — Brazil, Argentina
- Arachosia bergi (Simon, 1880) — Brazil, Uruguay, Argentina
- Arachosia bifasciata (Mello-Leitão, 1922) — Brazil, Argentina
- Arachosia carancho Rubio & Ramírez, 2015 — Argentina
- Arachosia cubana (Banks, 1909) — USA, Cuba
- Arachosia freiburgensis Keyserling, 1891 — Brazil, Argentina
- Arachosia honesta Keyserling, 1891 — Brazil, Argentina
- Arachosia kapiipeoi Rubio & Ramírez, 2015 — Venezuela, Brazil, Ecuador, Peru, Bolivia, Chile, Argentina
- Arachosia magna Rubio & Ramírez, 2015 — Brazil, Argentina
- Arachosia minensis (Mello-Leitão, 1926) — Brazil, Argentina
- Arachosia monserrate Rubio & Ramírez, 2015 — Colombia
- Arachosia oblonga (Keyserling, 1878) — Mexico
- Arachosia pinhalito Rubio & Ramírez, 2015 — Argentina
- Arachosia praesignis (Keyserling, 1891) — Brazil, Argentina
- Arachosia proseni (Mello-Leitão, 1944) — Brazil, Argentina, Uruguay
- Arachosia puta O. Pickard-Cambridge, 1892 — Panama, Brazil
- Arachosia striata (Keyserling, 1891) — Brazil
- Arachosia tungurahua Rubio & Ramírez, 2015 — Ecuador

=== Araiya ===
Araiya Ramírez, 2003

- Araiya coccinea (Simon, 1884) — Chile, Argentina
- Araiya pallida (Tullgren, 1902) (type) — Chile, Argentina

=== Australaena ===
Australaena Berland, 1942

- Australaena hystricina Berland, 1942 (type) — French Polynesia (Austral Is.)
- Australaena zimmermani Berland, 1942 — French Polynesia (Society Is.: Tahiti)

=== Axyracrus ===
Axyracrus Simon, 1884

- Axyracrus elegans Simon, 1884 (type) — Chile, Argentina

=== Aysenia ===
Aysenia Tullgren, 1902

- Aysenia araucana Ramírez, 2003 — Chile
- Aysenia barrigai Izquierdo & Ramírez, 2008 — Chile, Argentina
- Aysenia cylindrica Ramírez, 2003 — Chile, Argentina
- Aysenia elongata Tullgren, 1902 (type) — Chile, Argentina
- Aysenia grismadoi González & Ramírez, 2012 — Chile
- Aysenia huayun González & Ramírez, 2012 — Chile
- Aysenia izquierdoi González & Ramírez, 2012 — Chile
- Aysenia paposo Laborda, Ramírez & Pizarro-Araya, 2013 — Chile
- Aysenia segestrioides Ramírez, 2003 — Chile

=== Aysenoides ===
Aysenoides Ramírez, 2003

- Aysenoides colecole Ramírez, 2003 — Chile
- Aysenoides nahuel Izquierdo & Ramírez, 2008 — Chile
- Aysenoides parvus Ramírez, 2003 — Chile, Argentina
- Aysenoides simoi Laborda, Ramírez & Pizarro-Araya, 2013 — Chile, Argentina
- Aysenoides terricola Ramírez, 2003 (type) — Chile

=== Aysha ===
Aysha Keyserling, 1891

- Aysha affinis (Blackwall, 1862) — Brazil
- Aysha albovittata Mello-Leitão, 1944 — Brazil, Argentina
- Aysha basilisca (Mello-Leitão, 1922) — Brazil
- Aysha bonaldoi Brescovit, 1992 — Brazil
- Aysha boraceia Brescovit, 1992 — Brazil
- Aysha borgmeyeri (Mello-Leitão, 1926) — Brazil, Argentina
- Aysha brevimana (C. L. Koch, 1839) — Brazil
- Aysha caxambuensis (Mello-Leitão, 1926) — Brazil, Paraguay, Argentina
- Aysha chicama Brescovit, 1992 — Brazil
- Aysha clarovittata (Keyserling, 1891) — Brazil, Argentina
- Aysha curumim Brescovit, 1992 — Brazil
- Aysha diversicolor (Keyserling, 1891) — Brazil
- Aysha ericae Brescovit, 1992 — Brazil, Argentina
- Aysha fortis (Keyserling, 1891) — Brazil
- Aysha guaiba Brescovit, 1992 — Brazil
- Aysha guarapuava Brescovit, 1992 — Brazil
- Aysha helvola (Keyserling, 1891) — Brazil
- Aysha heraldica (Mello-Leitão, 1929) — Brazil
- Aysha insulana Chickering, 1937 — Panama
- Aysha janaita Brescovit, 1992 — Brazil
- Aysha lagenifera (Mello-Leitão, 1944) — Argentina
- Aysha lisei Brescovit, 1992 — Brazil
- Aysha marinonii Brescovit, 1992 — Brazil, Paraguay, Argentina
- Aysha montenegro Brescovit, 1992 — Brazil, Argentina
- Aysha piassaguera Brescovit, 1992 — Brazil
- Aysha pirassununga Brescovit, 1992 — Brazil, Argentina
- Aysha proseni Mello-Leitão, 1944 — Brazil, Argentina
- Aysha prospera Keyserling, 1891 (type) — Bolivia, Brazil, Uruguay, Argentina
- Aysha robusta (Keyserling, 1891) — Brazil
- Aysha rubromaculata (Keyserling, 1891) — Brazil, Argentina
- Aysha strandi (Caporiacco, 1947) — Guyana
- Aysha striolata (Keyserling, 1891) — Brazil
- Aysha subruba (Keyserling, 1891) — Brazil
- Aysha taeniata (Keyserling, 1891) — Brazil
- Aysha taim Brescovit, 1992 — Brazil
- Aysha tapejara Brescovit, 1992 — Brazil
- Aysha tertulia Brescovit, 1992 — Brazil, Argentina
- Aysha triunfo Brescovit, 1992 — Brazil, Argentina
- Aysha vacaria Brescovit, 1992 — Brazil
- Aysha yacupoi Brescovit, 1992 — Brazil, Argentina
- Aysha zenzesi (Mello-Leitão, 1945) — Brazil, Argentina

== B ==
=== Bromelina ===
Bromelina Brescovit, 1993

- Bromelina kochalkai Brescovit, 1993 — Colombia
- Bromelina oliola Brescovit, 1993 (type) — Brazil
- Bromelina zuniala Brescovit, 1993 — Venezuela

=== Buckupiella ===
Buckupiella Brescovit, 1997

- Buckupiella imperatriz Brescovit, 1997 (type) — Brazil, Argentina

== C ==
=== Coptoprepes ===
Coptoprepes Simon, 1884

- Coptoprepes bellavista Werenkraut & Ramírez, 2009 — Chile
- Coptoprepes campanensis Ramírez, 2003 — Chile
- Coptoprepes casablanca Werenkraut & Ramírez, 2009 — Chile, Argentina
- Coptoprepes contulmo Werenkraut & Ramírez, 2009 — Chile
- Coptoprepes ecotono Werenkraut & Ramírez, 2009 — Chile, Argentina
- Coptoprepes eden Werenkraut & Ramírez, 2009 — Chile
- Coptoprepes flavopilosus Simon, 1884 (type) — Chile, Argentina
- Coptoprepes laudani Barone, Werenkraut & Ramírez, 2016 — Chile, Argentina
- Coptoprepes nahuelbuta Ramírez, 2003 — Chile
- Coptoprepes recinto Werenkraut & Ramírez, 2009 — Chile
- Coptoprepes valdiviensis Ramírez, 2003 — Chile, Argentina
- Coptoprepes variegatus Mello-Leitão, 1940 — Argentina

== F ==
=== Ferrieria ===
Ferrieria Tullgren, 1901

- Ferrieria echinata Tullgren, 1901 (type) — Chile, Argentina

== G ==
=== Gamakia ===
Gamakia Ramírez, 2003

- Gamakia hirsuta Ramírez, 2003 (type) — Chile

=== Gayenna ===
Gayenna Nicolet, 1849

- Gayenna americana Nicolet, 1849 (type) — Chile, Argentina
- Gayenna brasiliensis Roewer, 1951 — Brazil
- Gayenna chrysophila Mello-Leitão, 1926 — Brazil
- Gayenna furcata (Keyserling, 1879) — Peru
- Gayenna ignava Banks, 1898 — Mexico
- Gayenna moreirae (Mello-Leitão, 1915) — Brazil
- Gayenna orizaba Banks, 1898 — Mexico
- Gayenna sigillum Mello-Leitão, 1941 — Argentina
- Gayenna trivittata (Bertkau, 1880) — Brazil
- Gayenna vittata (Keyserling, 1881) — Peru

=== Gayennoides ===
Gayennoides Ramírez, 2003

- Gayennoides losvilos Ramírez, 2003 — Chile
- Gayennoides molles Ramírez, 2003 (type) — Chile

== H ==
=== Hatitia ===
Hatitia Brescovit, 1997

- Hatitia canchaque Brescovit, 1997 — Ecuador, Peru
- Hatitia defonlonguei (Berland, 1913) — Ecuador
- Hatitia perrieri (Berland, 1913) — Ecuador
- Hatitia riveti (Berland, 1913) — Ecuador
- Hatitia sericea (L. Koch, 1866) — Colombia
- Hatitia yhuaia Brescovit, 1997 (type) — Peru

=== Hibana ===
Hibana

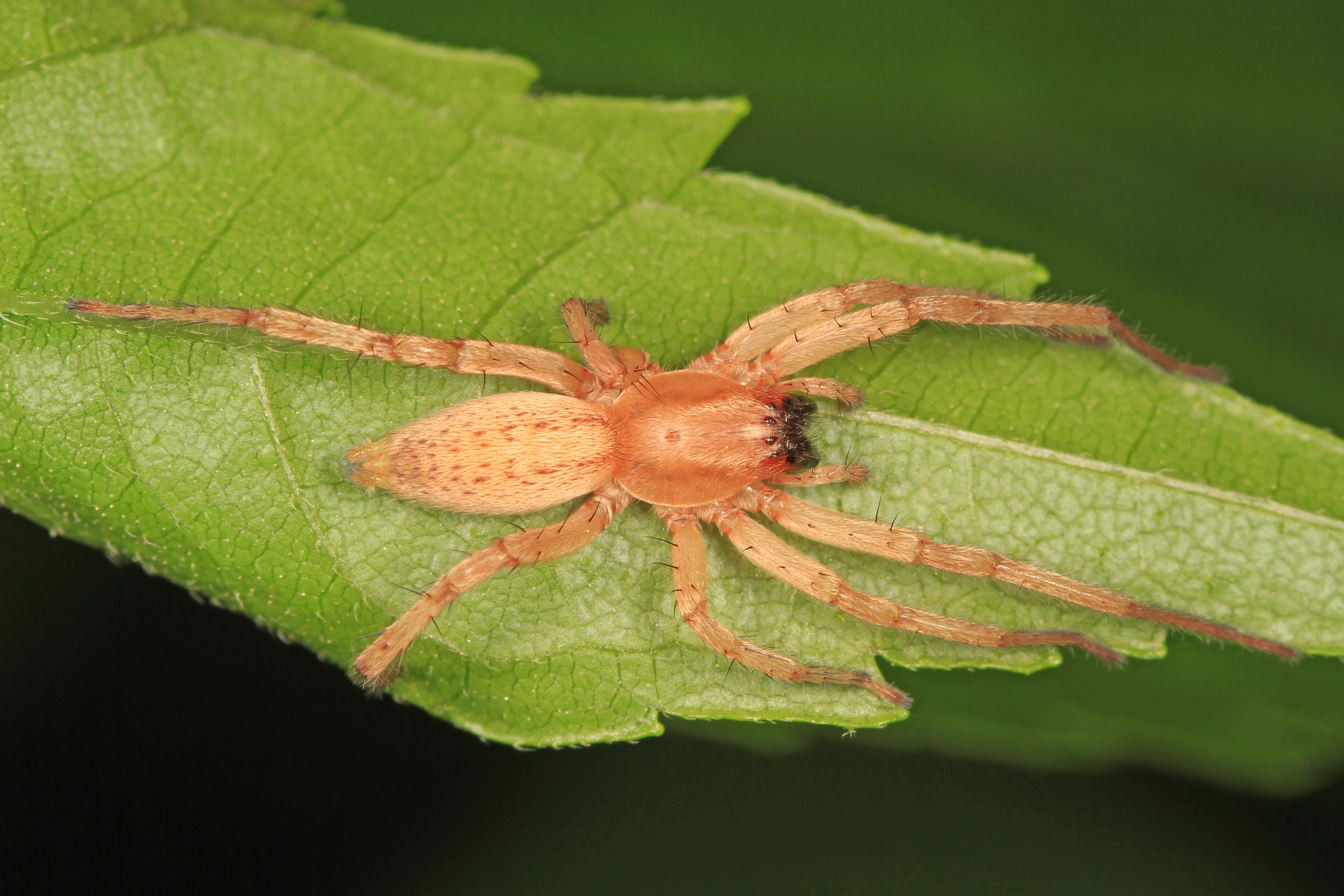
Garden Ghost Spider (Hibana gracilis)

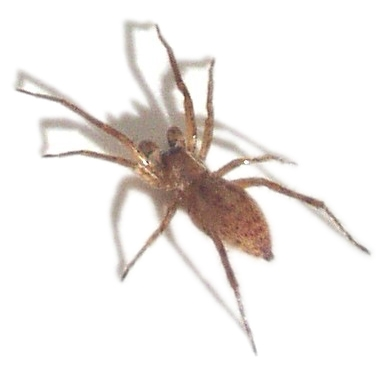
Hibana velox, male

Hibana Brescovit, 1991

- Hibana arunda (Platnick, 1974) — USA, Mexico
- Hibana banksi (Strand, 1906) — USA
- Hibana bicolor (Banks, 1909) — Costa Rica, Colombia
- Hibana cambridgei (Bryant, 1931) — USA, Mexico
- Hibana discolor (Mello-Leitão, 1929) — Brazil, Bolivia
- Hibana flavescens (Schmidt, 1971) — Colombia
- Hibana fusca (Franganillo, 1926) — Cuba
- Hibana futilis (Banks, 1898) — USA to Venezuela, Cuba
- Hibana gracilis (Hentz, 1847) (type) — USA, Canada
- Hibana incursa (Chamberlin, 1919) — USA to Panama
- Hibana longipalpa (Bryant, 1931) — El Salvador, Nicaragua, Costa Rica
- Hibana melloleitaoi (Caporiacco, 1947) — Mexico to Brazil
- Hibana similaris (Banks, 1929) — Mexico to Brazil
- Hibana taboga Brescovit, 1991 — Panama
- Hibana talmina Brescovit, 1993 — Dominican Rep., Trinidad, northern South America
- Hibana tenuis (L. Koch, 1866) — Mexico to Venezuela, Caribbean
- Hibana turquinensis (Bryant, 1940) — Cuba
- Hibana velox (Becker, 1879) — USA, Mexico, Caribbean

== I ==
=== Iguarima ===
Iguarima Brescovit, 1997

- Iguarima censoria (Keyserling, 1891) (type) — Brazil
- Iguarima pichincha Brescovit, 1997 — Ecuador

=== Ilocomba ===
Ilocomba Brescovit, 1997

- Ilocomba marta Brescovit, 1997 (type) — Colombia
- Ilocomba perija Brescovit, 1997 — Colombia

=== Isigonia ===
Isigonia Simon, 1897

- Isigonia camacan Brescovit, 1991 — Brazil
- Isigonia limbata Simon, 1897 (type) — Venezuela, Peru, Brazil
- Isigonia reducta (Chickering, 1940) — Panama

=== Italaman ===
Italaman Brescovit, 1997

- Italaman santamaria Brescovit, 1997 (type) — Colombia, Brazil, Argentina

== J ==
=== Jessica ===
Jessica Brescovit, 1997

- Jessica campesina (Bauab, 1979) — Brazil
- Jessica eden Brescovit, 1999 — Venezuela
- Jessica erythrostoma (Mello-Leitão, 1939) — Colombia to Argentina
- Jessica fidelis (Mello-Leitão, 1922) — Brazil, Bolivia, Paraguay, Argentina
- Jessica glabra (Keyserling, 1891) — Brazil, Paraguay, Argentina
- Jessica itatiaia Brescovit, 1999 — Brazil
- Jessica osoriana (Mello-Leitão, 1922) (type) — Brazil, Paraguay, Argentina
- Jessica pachecoi Brescovit, 1999 — Brazil
- Jessica puava Brescovit, 1999 — Brazil
- Jessica rafaeli Brescovit, 1999 — Brazil
- Jessica renneri Brescovit, 1999 — Brazil
- Jessica sergipana Brescovit, 1999 — Brazil

=== Josa ===
Josa Keyserling, 1891

- Josa analis (Simon, 1897) — Venezuela
- Josa andesiana (Berland, 1913) — Ecuador
- Josa bryantae (Caporiacco, 1955) — Venezuela
- Josa calilegua Ramírez, 2003 — Argentina
- Josa chazaliae (Simon, 1897) — Colombia
- Josa gounellei (Simon, 1897) — Brazil
- Josa keyserlingi (L. Koch, 1866) — Colombia, Brazil
- Josa laeta (O. Pickard-Cambridge, 1896) — Costa Rica
- Josa lojensis (Berland, 1913) — Ecuador
- Josa lutea (Keyserling, 1878) (type) — Colombia, Ecuador
- Josa maura (Simon, 1897) — Venezuela
- Josa nigrifrons (Simon, 1897) — Mexico to Bolivia
- Josa personata (Simon, 1897) — Ecuador
- Josa riveti (Berland, 1913) — Ecuador, Bolivia
- Josa simoni (Berland, 1913) — Ecuador

== K ==
=== Katissa ===
Katissa Brescovit, 1997

- Katissa delicatula (Banks, 1909) — Costa Rica
- Katissa elegans (Banks, 1909) — Costa Rica
- Katissa guyasamini Dupérré & Tapia, 2016 — Ecuador
- Katissa kurusiki Dupérré & Tapia, 2016 — Ecuador
- Katissa lycosoides (Chickering, 1937) — Panama
- Katissa puyu Dupérré & Tapia, 2016 — Ecuador
- Katissa simplicipalpis (Simon, 1898) (type) — Lesser Antilles, Panama, Peru
- Katissa tamya Dupérré & Tapia, 2016 — Ecuador
- Katissa yaya Dupérré & Tapia, 2016 — Ecuador
- Katissa zimarae (Reimoser, 1939) — Costa Rica

== L ==
=== Lepajan ===
Lepajan Brescovit, 1993

- Lepajan edwardsi Brescovit, 1997 — Ecuador
- Lepajan montanus (Chickering, 1940) (type) — Panama

=== Lupettiana ===
Lupettiana Brescovit, 1997

- Lupettiana bimini Brescovit, 1999 — Bahama Is.
- Lupettiana eberhardi Brescovit, 1999 — Costa Rica
- Lupettiana levii Brescovit, 1999 — Hispaniola
- Lupettiana linguanea Brescovit, 1997 (type) — Jamaica, Guadeloupe, Dominica
- Lupettiana manauara Brescovit, 1999 — Brazil
- Lupettiana mordax (O. Pickard-Cambridge, 1896) — USA to Peru, Brazil
- Lupettiana parvula (Banks, 1903) — Cuba, Hispaniola
- Lupettiana piedra Brescovit, 1999 — Cuba
- Lupettiana spinosa (Bryant, 1948) — Hispaniola

== M ==
=== Macrophyes ===
Macrophyes O. Pickard-Cambridge, 1893

- Macrophyes attenuata O. Pickard-Cambridge, 1893 (type) — Mexico
- Macrophyes elongata Chickering, 1937 — Costa Rica, Panama
- Macrophyes jundiai Brescovit, 1993 — Brazil, Argentina
- Macrophyes manati Brescovit, 1993 — Peru
- Macrophyes silvae Brescovit, 1992 — Peru

=== Mesilla ===
Mesilla Simon, 1903

- Mesilla anyphaenoides Caporiacco, 1954 — French Guiana
- Mesilla vittiventris Simon, 1903 (type) — Colombia, Ecuador

=== Monapia ===
Monapia Simon, 1897

- Monapia alupuran Ramírez, 1995 — Chile
- Monapia angusta (Mello-Leitão, 1944) — Uruguay, Argentina
- Monapia carolina Ramírez, 1999 — Argentina
- Monapia charrua Ramírez, 1999 — Uruguay, Argentina
- Monapia dilaticollis (Nicolet, 1849) (type) — Chile, Argentina, Juan Fernandez Is.
- Monapia fierro Ramírez, 1999 — Argentina
- Monapia guenoana Ramírez, 1999 — Uruguay, Argentina
- Monapia huaria Ramírez, 1995 — Chile
- Monapia lutea (Nicolet, 1849) — Chile, Argentina
- Monapia pichinahuel Ramírez, 1995 — Chile, Argentina
- Monapia silvatica Ramírez, 1995 — Chile, Argentina
- Monapia tandil Ramírez, 1999 — Argentina
- Monapia vittata (Simon, 1884) — Chile, Argentina

== N ==
=== Negayan ===
Negayan Ramírez, 2003

- Negayan ancha Lopardo, 2005 — Chile, Argentina
- Negayan argentina Lopardo, 2005 — Argentina
- Negayan cerronegro Lopardo, 2005 — Argentina
- Negayan coccinea (Mello-Leitão, 1943) — Argentina
- Negayan enrollada Lopardo, 2005 — Chile, Argentina
- Negayan excepta (Tullgren, 1901) — Chile, Argentina
- Negayan paduana (Karsch, 1880) — Chile, Argentina, Falkland Is.
- Negayan puno Lopardo, 2005 — Peru, Argentina
- Negayan tarapaca Lopardo, 2005 — Peru, Chile
- Negayan tata Lopardo, 2005 — Chile, Argentina
- Negayan tridentata (Simon, 1886) (type) — Argentina
- Negayan tucuman Lopardo, 2005 — Argentina

== O ==
=== Osoriella ===
Osoriella Mello-Leitão, 1922

- Osoriella domingos Brescovit, 1998 — Brazil
- Osoriella pallidoemanu Mello-Leitão, 1926 — Brazil
- Osoriella rubella (Keyserling, 1891) (type) — Brazil
- Osoriella tahela Brescovit, 1998 — Peru, Brazil, Bolivia, Paraguay, Argentina

=== Otoniela ===
Otoniela Brescovit, 1997

- Otoniela adisi Brescovit, 1997 (type) — Peru, Brazil
- Otoniela quadrivittata (Simon, 1897) — Venezuela, Argentina

=== Oxysoma ===
Oxysoma Nicolet, 1849

- Oxysoma chiloensis (Ramírez, 2003) — Chile, Argentina
- Oxysoma itambezinho Ramírez, 2003 — Brazil
- Oxysoma kuni Aisen & Ramírez, 2015 — Chile
- Oxysoma longiventre (Nicolet, 1849) — Chile, Argentina
- Oxysoma losruiles Aisen & Ramírez, 2015 — Chile
- Oxysoma macrocuspis Aisen & Ramírez, 2015 — Chile
- Oxysoma punctatum Nicolet, 1849 (type) — Chile, Argentina
- Oxysoma saccatum (Tullgren, 1902) — Chile, Argentina

== P ==
=== Patrera ===
Patrera Simon, 1903

- Patrera apora (Chamberlin, 1916) — Peru
- Patrera armata (Chickering, 1940) — Panama, Brazil
- Patrera auricoma (L. Koch, 1866) — Colombia
- Patrera cita (Keyserling, 1891) — Brazil
- Patrera fulvastra Simon, 1903 (type) — Colombia, Ecuador
- Patrera hatunkiru Dupérré & Tapia, 2016 — Ecuador
- Patrera lauta (Chickering, 1940) — Panama
- Patrera longipes (Keyserling, 1891) — Brazil, Argentina
- Patrera philipi Dupérré & Tapia, 2016 — Ecuador
- Patrera procera (Keyserling, 1891) — Brazil, Argentina
- Patrera puta (O. Pickard-Cambridge, 1896) — Costa Rica
- Patrera ruber (F. O. Pickard-Cambridge, 1900) — Guatemala, Costa Rica, Colombia, Ecuador
- Patrera shida Dupérré & Tapia, 2016 — Ecuador
- Patrera stylifer (F. O. Pickard-Cambridge, 1900) — Panama
- Patrera suni Dupérré & Tapia, 2016 — Ecuador
- Patrera virgata (Keyserling, 1891) — Brazil
- Patrera witsu Dupérré & Tapia, 2016 — Ecuador

=== Phidyle ===
Phidyle Simon, 1880

- Phidyle punctipes (Nicolet, 1849) (type) — Chile

=== Philisca ===
Philisca Simon, 1884

- Philisca accentifera Simon, 1904 — Chile, Argentina
- Philisca amaena (Simon, 1884) — Chile, Argentina
- Philisca atrata Soto & Ramírez, 2012 — Chile, Argentina
- Philisca doilu (Ramírez, 1993) — Chile, Argentina
- Philisca hahni Simon, 1884 (type) — Chile, Argentina
- Philisca huapi Ramírez, 2003 — Chile, Argentina
- Philisca hyadesi (Simon, 1884) — Chile, Argentina
- Philisca ingens Berland, 1924 — Chile (Juan Fernandez Is.)
- Philisca ornata Berland, 1924 — Chile (Juan Fernandez Is.)
- Philisca pizarroi Soto & Ramírez, 2012 — Chile (Juan Fernandez Is.)
- Philisca robinson Soto & Ramírez, 2012 — Chile (Juan Fernandez Is.)
- Philisca robusta Soto & Ramírez, 2012 — Chile (Juan Fernandez Is.)
- Philisca tripunctata (Nicolet, 1849) — Chile, Argentina, Falkland Is.
- Philisca viernes Soto & Ramírez, 2012 — Chile (Juan Fernandez Is.)

=== Pippuhana ===
Pippuhana Brescovit, 1997

- Pippuhana calcar (Bryant, 1931) — USA
- Pippuhana donaldi (Chickering, 1940) — Panama
- Pippuhana gandu Brescovit, 1997 (type) — Brazil
- Pippuhana unicolor (Keyserling, 1891) — Brazil

== R ==
=== Rathalos ===
Rathalos Lin & Li, 2022

- Rathalos treecko Lin & Li, 2021 — China (Hainan)
- Rathalos xiushanensis Song & Zhu, 1991 – China

== S ==
=== Sanogasta ===
Sanogasta Mello-Leitão, 1941

- Sanogasta alticola (Simon, 1896) — Peru, Bolivia, Argentina
- Sanogasta approximata (Tullgren, 1901) — Chile, Argentina
- Sanogasta backhauseni (Simon, 1895) — Chile, Argentina, Uruguay
- Sanogasta backhauseni patagonicus (Simon, 1905) — Argentina
- Sanogasta bonariensis (Mello-Leitão, 1940) — Argentina
- Sanogasta maculatipes (Keyserling, 1878) (type) — Peru, Bolivia, Brazil, Uruguay, Argentina, Chile. Introduced to Easter Is.
- Sanogasta maculosa (Nicolet, 1849) — Chile, Argentina, Juan Fernandez Is.
- Sanogasta mandibularis Ramírez, 2003 — Argentina, Paraguay
- Sanogasta minuta (Keyserling, 1891) — Brazil, Argentina
- Sanogasta paucilineata (Mello-Leitão, 1945) — Argentina
- Sanogasta pehuenche Ramírez, 2003 — Chile, Argentina
- Sanogasta puma Ramírez, 2003 — Brazil, Uruguay, Argentina
- Sanogasta rufithorax (Tullgren, 1902) — Chile
- Sanogasta tenuis Ramírez, 2003 — Brazil, Argentina
- Sanogasta x-signata (Keyserling, 1891) — Brazil, Uruguay, Argentina

=== Selknamia ===
Selknamia Ramírez, 2003

- Selknamia minima Ramírez, 2003 (type) — Chile, Argentina

=== Shuyushka ===
Shuyushka Dupérré & Tapia, 2016

- Shuyushka achachay Dupérré & Tapia, 2016 — Ecuador
- Shuyushka moscai Dupérré & Tapia, 2016 — Ecuador
- Shuyushka wachi Dupérré & Tapia, 2016 (type) — Ecuador

=== Sillus ===
Sillus F. O. Pickard-Cambridge, 1900

- Sillus attiguus (O. Pickard-Cambridge, 1896) (type) — Mexico
- Sillus curvispina F. O. Pickard-Cambridge, 1900 — Panama
- Sillus delicatus Mello-Leitão, 1922 — Brazil
- Sillus dubius (Chickering, 1937) — Panama
- Sillus furciger Caporiacco, 1954 — French Guiana
- Sillus imbecillus (Keyserling, 1891) — Brazil
- Sillus longispina F. O. Pickard-Cambridge, 1900 — Guatemala, Costa Rica, Panama
- Sillus lunula F. O. Pickard-Cambridge, 1900 — Guatemala
- Sillus pellucidus (Keyserling, 1891) — Brazil
- Sillus ravus Chickering, 1940 — Panama

=== Sinophaena ===
Sinophaena Lin & Li, 2021

- Sinophaena bivalva Zhang & Song, 2004 — China
- Sinophaena xiweni Lin & Li, 2021 — China

== T ==
=== Tafana ===
Tafana Simon, 1903

- Tafana quelchi (Pocock, 1895) — Venezuela
- Tafana riveti Simon, 1903 (type) — Ecuador
- Tafana silhavyi (Caporiacco, 1955) — Venezuela
- Tafana straminea (L. Koch, 1866) — Colombia

=== Tasata ===
Tasata Simon, 1903

- Tasata centralis Ramírez, 2003 — Argentina
- Tasata frenata (Mello-Leitão, 1947) — Brazil
- Tasata fuscotaeniata (Keyserling, 1891) — Brazil
- Tasata nova (Mello-Leitão, 1922) — Brazil
- Tasata parcepunctata Simon, 1903 (type) — Argentina, Uruguay
- Tasata punctata (Keyserling, 1891) — Brazil
- Tasata quinquenotata (Simon, 1897) — Brazil
- Tasata reticulata (Mello-Leitão, 1943) — Brazil
- Tasata taim Ramírez, 2003 — Brazil
- Tasata taperae (Mello-Leitão, 1929) — Brazil
- Tasata tigris Mello-Leitão, 1941 — Brazil
- Tasata tripunctata (Mello-Leitão, 1941) — Brazil
- Tasata tullgreni Roewer, 1951 — Bolivia
- Tasata unipunctata (Simon, 1897) — Brazil
- Tasata variolosa Mello-Leitão, 1943 — Brazil, Uruguay, Argentina

=== Temnida ===
Temnida Simon, 1896

- Temnida rosario Brescovit, 1997 — Brazil, Paraguay, Argentina
- Temnida simplex Simon, 1897 (type) — Venezuela

=== Teudis ===
Teudis O. Pickard-Cambridge, 1896

- Teudis angusticeps (Keyserling, 1891) — Brazil
- Teudis atrofasciatus Mello-Leitão, 1922 — Brazil
- Teudis bicornutus (Tullgren, 1905) — Bolivia
- Teudis buelowae (Mello-Leitão, 1946) — Paraguay
- Teudis cambridgei Chickering, 1940 — Panama
- Teudis comstocki (Soares & Camargo, 1948) — Brazil
- Teudis concolor (Keyserling, 1891) — Brazil
- Teudis cordobensis Mello-Leitão, 1941 — Argentina
- Teudis dichotomus Mello-Leitão, 1929 — Brazil
- Teudis fatuus (Mello-Leitão, 1942) — Brazil, Argentina
- Teudis formosus (Keyserling, 1891) — Brazil
- Teudis gastrotaeniatus Mello-Leitão, 1944 — Argentina
- Teudis geminus Petrunkevitch, 1911 (type) — Guatemala, Costa Rica, Panama, Ecuador
- Teudis griseus (Keyserling, 1891) — Brazil
- Teudis itatiayae Mello-Leitão, 1915 — Brazil
- Teudis juradoi Chickering, 1940 — Panama
- Teudis lenis (Keyserling, 1891) — Brazil
- Teudis morenus (Mello-Leitão, 1941) — Argentina
- Teudis opertaneus (Keyserling, 1891) — Brazil
- Teudis parvulus (Keyserling, 1891) — Brazil
- Teudis peragrans (O. Pickard-Cambridge, 1898) — Guatemala, Brazil
- Teudis recentissimus (Keyserling, 1891) — Brazil
- Teudis roseus F. O. Pickard-Cambridge, 1900 — Panama
- Teudis suspiciosus (Keyserling, 1891) — Brazil
- Teudis tensipes (Keyserling, 1891) — Brazil
- Teudis tensus (Keyserling, 1891) — Brazil
- Teudis ypsilon Mello-Leitão, 1922 — Brazil

=== Thaloe ===
Thaloe Brescovit, 1993

- Thaloe ennery Brescovit, 1993 — Hispaniola
- Thaloe remotus (Bryant, 1948) (type) — Hispaniola
- Thaloe tricuspis (Bryant, 1940) — Cuba

=== Timbuka ===
Timbuka Brescovit, 1997

- Timbuka bogotensis (L. Koch, 1866) — Colombia, Bolivia
- Timbuka boquete Brescovit, 1997 (type) — Costa Rica, Panama, Colombia
- Timbuka granadensis (Keyserling, 1879) — Colombia
- Timbuka larvata (O. Pickard-Cambridge, 1896) — Mexico
- Timbuka masseneti (Berland, 1913) — Ecuador
- Timbuka meridiana (L. Koch, 1866) — Colombia

=== Tomopisthes ===
Tomopisthes Simon, 1884

- Tomopisthes horrendus (Nicolet, 1849) (type) — Chile, Argentina
- Tomopisthes puconensis (Ramírez, 2003) — Chile, Argentina
- Tomopisthes pusillus (Nicolet, 1849) — Chile, Argentina
- Tomopisthes tullgreni Simon, 1905 — Argentina
- Tomopisthes varius Simon, 1884 — Chile, Argentina

== U ==
=== Umuara ===
Umuara Brescovit, 1997

- Umuara fasciata (Blackwall, 1862) (type) — Venezuela, Brazil
- Umuara freddyi Oliveira & Brescovit, 2015 — Brazil
- Umuara junin Brescovit, 1997 — Peru
- Umuara juquia Brescovit, 1997 — Brazil
- Umuara pydanieli Brescovit, 1997 — Brazil
- Umuara xingo Oliveira & Brescovit, 2015 — Brazil

== W ==
=== Wulfila ===
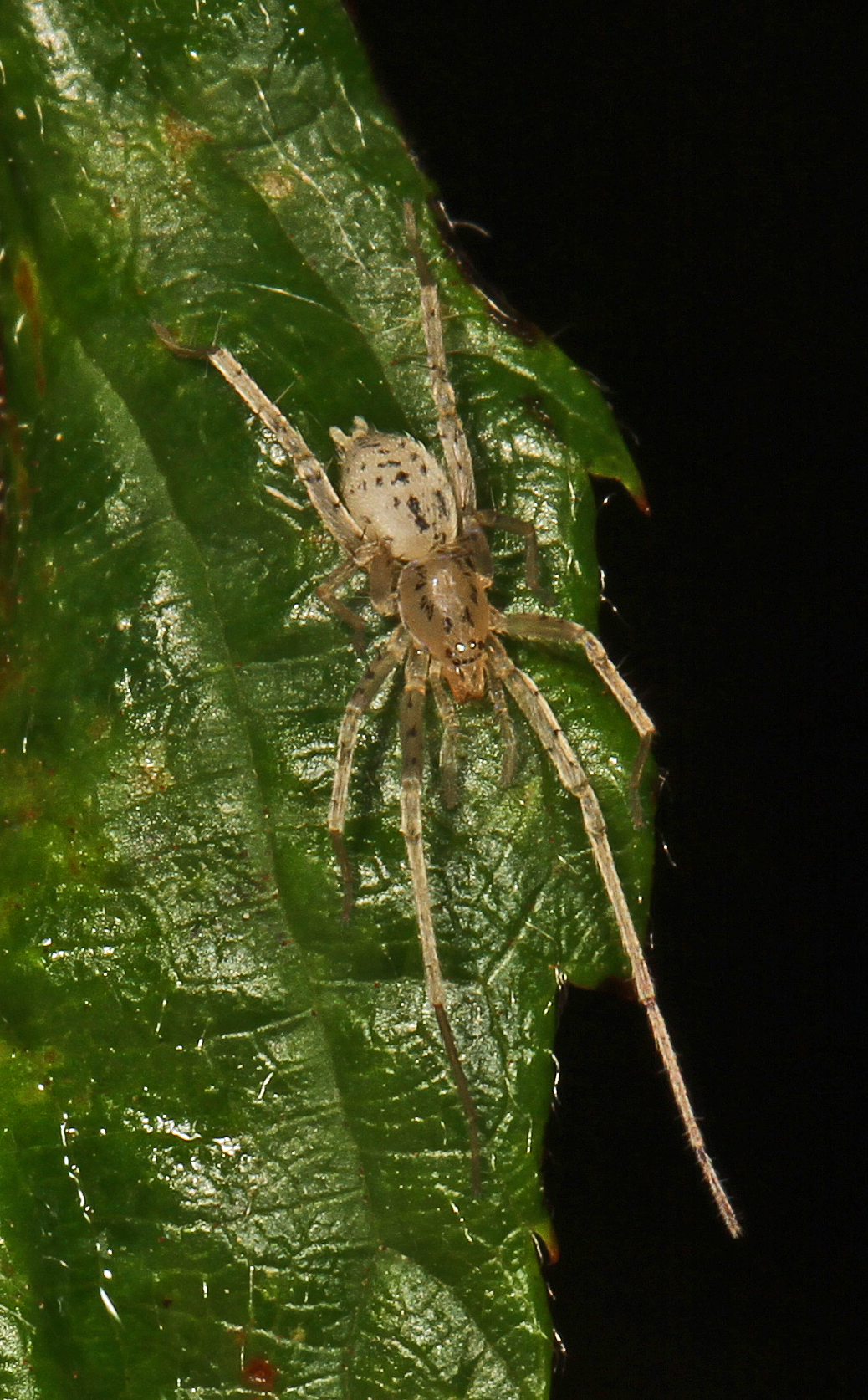
Wulfila saltabundus

Wulfila O. Pickard-Cambridge, 1895

- Wulfila albens (Hentz, 1847) — USA
- Wulfila albus (Mello-Leitão, 1945) — Brazil, Paraguay, Argentina
- Wulfila arraijanicus Chickering, 1940 — Panama
- Wulfila bryantae Platnick, 1974 — USA, Mexico
- Wulfila coamoanus Petrunkevitch, 1930 — Puerto Rico
- Wulfila diversus O. Pickard-Cambridge, 1895 — Mexico
- Wulfila fasciculus (Bryant, 1948) — Hispaniola
- Wulfila fragilis Chickering, 1937 — Panama
- Wulfila fragilis (Bryant, 1948) — Hispaniola
- Wulfila gracilipes (Banks, 1903) — Hispaniola
- Wulfila immaculatus Banks, 1914 — USA, Cuba, Puerto Rico
- Wulfila immaculellus (Gertsch, 1933) — USA, Mexico
- Wulfila inconspicuus Petrunkevitch, 1930 — Puerto Rico
- Wulfila innoxius Chickering, 1940 — Panama
- Wulfila inornatus (O. Pickard-Cambridge, 1898) — Mexico
- Wulfila isolatus Bryant, 1942 — Puerto Rico
- Wulfila longidens Mello-Leitão, 1948 — Guyana
- Wulfila longipes (Bryant, 1940) — Cuba
- Wulfila macer (Simon, 1898) — St. Vincent
- Wulfila macropalpus Petrunkevitch, 1930 — Puerto Rico
- Wulfila maculatus Chickering, 1937 — Panama
- Wulfila mandibulatus (Petrunkevitch, 1925) — Panama
- Wulfila modestus Chickering, 1937 — Panama
- Wulfila pallidus O. Pickard-Cambridge, 1895 (type) — Mexico
- Wulfila parvulus (Banks, 1898) — Mexico
- Wulfila pavidus (Bryant, 1948) — Mexico
- Wulfila pellucidus Chickering, 1937 — Panama
- Wulfila pretiosus Banks, 1914 — Cuba
- Wulfila proximus O. Pickard-Cambridge, 1895 — Mexico
- Wulfila pulverulentus Chickering, 1937 — Panama
- Wulfila saltabundus (Hentz, 1847) — USA, Canada
- Wulfila sanguineus Franganillo, 1931 — Cuba
- Wulfila scopulatus Simon, 1897 — America
- Wulfila spatulatus F. O. Pickard-Cambridge, 1900 — Guatemala
- Wulfila spinosus Chickering, 1937 — Panama
- Wulfila sublestus Chickering, 1940 — Panama
- Wulfila tantillus Chickering, 1940 — USA to Panama
- Wulfila tauricorneus Franganillo, 1935 — Cuba
- Wulfila tenuissimus Simon, 1896 — Jamaica
- Wulfila tinctus Franganillo, 1930 — Cuba
- Wulfila tropicus Petrunkevitch, 1930 — Puerto Rico
- Wulfila ventralis Banks, 1906 — Bahama Is.
- Wulfila wunda Platnick, 1974 — USA, Cuba, Puerto Rico (Mona Is.)

=== Wulfilopsis ===
Wulfilopsis Soares & Camargo, 1955

- Wulfilopsis frenata (Keyserling, 1891) — Brazil
- Wulfilopsis leopoldina Brescovit, 1997 — Brazil
- Wulfilopsis martinsi Brescovit, 1997 — Brazil
- Wulfilopsis pygmaea (Keyserling, 1891) — Brazil
- Wulfilopsis tenuipes (Keyserling, 1891) (type) — Brazil
- Wulfilopsis tripunctata (Mello-Leitão, 1947) — Brazil

== X ==
=== Xiruana ===
Xiruana Brescovit, 1997

- Xiruana affinis (Mello-Leitão, 1922) — Brazil
- Xiruana ajuricaba Oliveira & Brescovit, 2015 — Brazil
- Xiruana aymara Oliveira & Brescovit, 2015 — Bolivia
- Xiruana bifida Oliveira & Brescovit, 2015 — Brazil, Paraguay
- Xiruana cocha Oliveira & Brescovit, 2015 — Peru
- Xiruana fiebrigi Oliveira & Brescovit, 2015 — Paraguay
- Xiruana gracilipes (Keyserling, 1891) (type) — Brazil, Bolivia, Argentina
- Xiruana guaia Oliveira & Brescovit, 2015 — Brazil
- Xiruana hirsuta (Mello-Leitão, 1938) — Venezuela, Brazil, Paraguay, Argentina, Uruguay
- Xiruana jaboticabal Oliveira & Brescovit, 2015 — Brazil
- Xiruana lusitania Oliveira & Brescovit, 2015 — Brazil
- Xiruana minacu Oliveira & Brescovit, 2015 — Brazil
- Xiruana pocone Oliveira & Brescovit, 2015 — Brazil, Paraguay, Argentina
- Xiruana silarae Oliveira & Brescovit, 2015 — Brazil
- Xiruana tapirape Oliveira & Brescovit, 2015 — Brazil
- Xiruana tetraseta (Mello-Leitão, 1939) — Venezuela, Brazil, Paraguay
- Xiruana tribarrense Oliveira & Brescovit, 2015 — Brazil
