= Eldar galadrielae =

Scientific classification
- Kingdom: Animalia
- Phylum: Arthropoda
- Subphylum: Chelicerata
- Class: Arachnida
- Order: Araneae
- Infraorder: Araneomorphae
- Family: Anyphaenidae
- Genus: Eldar; Oliveira & Brescovit, 2025
- Species: E. galadrielae

Binomial name
- Eldar galadrielae Oliveira & Brescovit, 2025

Species of spider

Eldar galadrielae is a species of spider in the family Anyphaenidae. It is the only species in the monotypic genus Eldar. The species is endemic to Brazil.

== Distribution ==
Eldar galadrielae is found in the Brazilian states of Espírito Santo, Rio de Janeiro, and São Paulo.

== Description ==
Males have a total length of 3.7–4.7 mm and females 3.5–5.3 mm. The carapace is brown with darker V-shaped markings in males, while females are pale white. Males have chelicerae approximately half the length of the carapace.

== Taxonomy ==
Eldar was established in 2025 with E. galadrielae as the type species. Males of Eldar resemble those of Aljassa, Hibana, Hatitia, Pippuhana, and Tafana.

Females resemble those of Aljassa, Hatitia, Ilocomba, Macrophyes, Tafana, and Wulfilopsis.

== Etymology ==
The genus name Eldar honors J. R. R. Tolkien, who created the fictional Eldar (the "Star People") in his writings. The name "Eldar" is a term from the Elven language given to all Elves. The specific epithet galadrielae pays tribute to Galadriel, one of Tolkien's elven characters known as the Keeper of Nenya, the Water Ring.
