= Druzia =

Scientific classification
- Kingdom: Animalia
- Phylum: Arthropoda
- Subphylum: Chelicerata
- Class: Arachnida
- Order: Araneae
- Infraorder: Araneomorphae
- Family: Salticidae
- Genus: Druzia; Ruiz & Brescovit, 2013
- Species: D. flavostriata

Binomial name
- Druzia flavostriata (Simon, 1901)

Genus of spiders

Druzia is a monotypic genus of Brazilian jumping spiders containing the single species, Druzia flavostriata. It was first described by G. R. S. Ruiz & Antônio Domingos Brescovit in 2013, and is only found in Brazil.
