= Edilemma =

Scientific classification
- Kingdom: Animalia
- Phylum: Arthropoda
- Subphylum: Chelicerata
- Class: Arachnida
- Order: Araneae
- Infraorder: Araneomorphae
- Family: Salticidae
- Genus: Edilemma; Ruiz & Brescovit, 2006
- Species: E. foraminifera

Binomial name
- Edilemma foraminifera Ruiz & Brescovit, 2006

Genus of spiders

Edilemma is a monotypic genus of Brazilian jumping spiders containing the single species, Edilemma foraminifera. It was first described by G. R. S. Ruiz & Antônio Domingos Brescovit in 2006, and is only found in Brazil.
