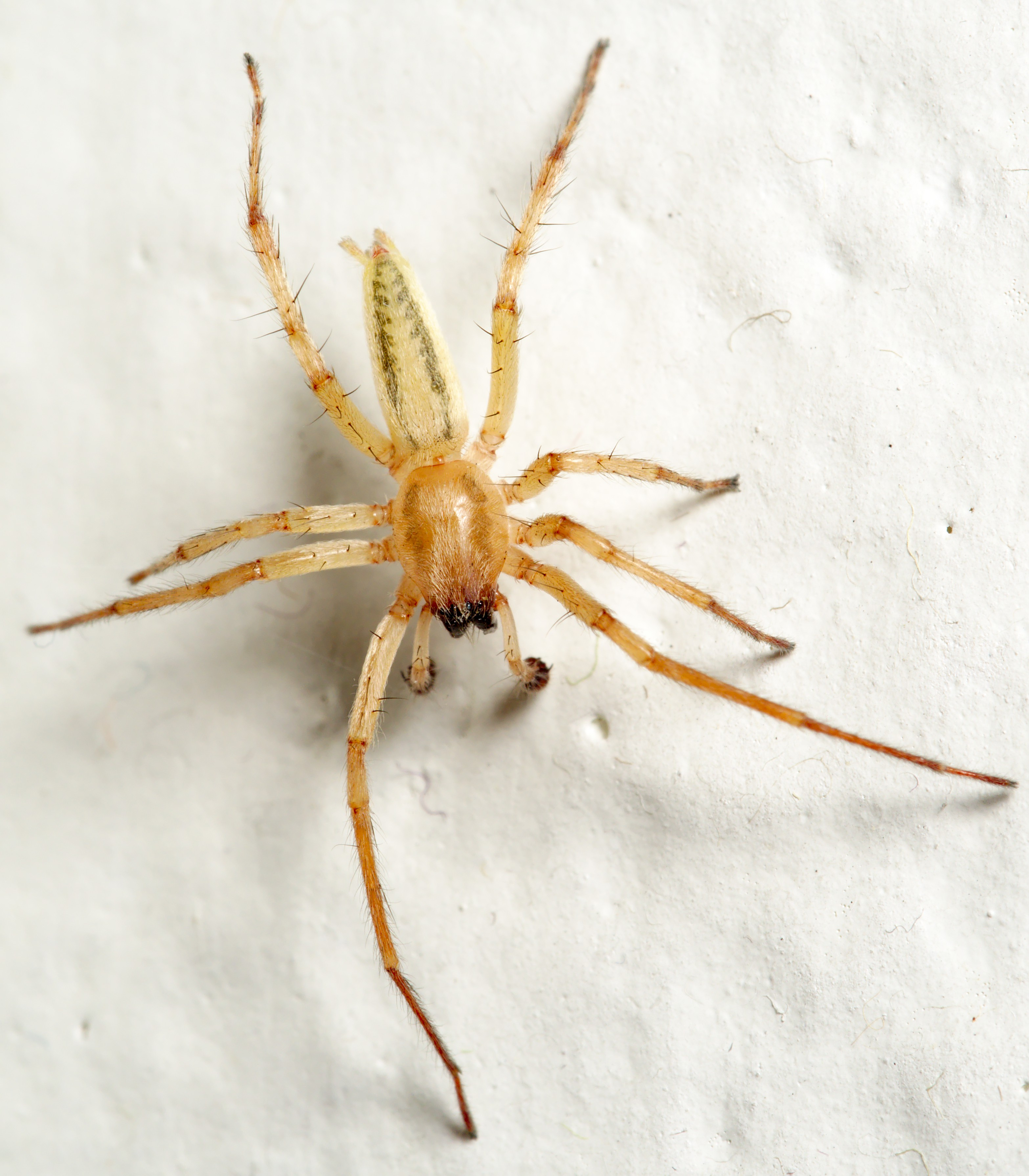
- Ghost spider (Hibana incursa)

Scientific classification
- Kingdom: Animalia
- Phylum: Arthropoda
- Subphylum: Chelicerata
- Class: Arachnida
- Order: Araneae
- Infraorder: Araneomorphae
- Family: Anyphaenidae; Bertkau, 1878

Diversity
- 61 genera, 669 species
- blue: reported countries (WSC) green: observation hotspots (iNaturalist)

= Anyphaenidae =

Anyphaenidae Temporal range: Palaeogene–present

Family of spiders

Anyphaenidae is a family of araneomorph spiders, sometimes called anyphaenid sac spiders or ghost spiders. They are distinguished from the sac spiders of the family Clubionidae and other spiders by having the abdominal spiracle placed one third to one half of the way anterior to the spinnerets toward the epigastric furrow on the underside of the abdomen. In most spiders the spiracle is just anterior to the spinnerets.

Like clubionids, anyphaenids have conical anterior spinnerets and are wandering predators that build silken retreats, or sacs, usually on plant terminals, between leaves, under bark or under rocks. There are more than 600 species in over 60 genera worldwide.

The family is widespread and includes such common genera as Anyphaena (worldwide except tropical Africa and Asia) and Hibana (New World). Only one species (A. accentuata) occurs in northwestern Europe.

Species in the latter genus are important predators in several agricultural systems, especially tree crops. They are able to detect and feed on insect eggs, despite their poor eyesight. They share this ability at least with some miturgid spiders.

== Genera ==
As of October 2026, this family includes 61 genera and 669 species:

- Acanthoceto Mello-Leitão, 1944 – South America
- Aljassa Brescovit, 1997 – Colombia, Peru, Venezuela
- Amaurobioides O. Pickard-Cambridge, 1883 – Namibia, South Africa, Australia, New Zealand, Chile
- Anyphaena Sundevall, 1833 – North Africa, Europe to Central Asia, Asia, North America, Peru
- Anyphaenoides Berland, 1913 – Costa Rica, Panama, South America, Leeward Antilles
- Arachosia O. Pickard-Cambridge, 1882 – Cuba, Panama, Mexico, United States, South America
- Araiya Ramírez, 2003 – Argentina, Chile
- Australaena Berland, 1942 – French Polynesia
- Axyracrus Simon, 1884 – Argentina, Chile
- Aysenia Tullgren, 1902 – Argentina, Chile
- Aysenoides Ramírez, 2003 – Argentina, Chile
- Aysha Keyserling, 1891 – Panama, South America
- Bromelina Brescovit, 1993 – Brazil, Colombia, Venezuela
- Buckupiella Brescovit, 1997 – Argentina, Brazil
- Coptoprepes Simon, 1884 – Argentina, Chile
- Eldar Oliveira & Brescovit, 2025 – Brazil
- Ferrieria Tullgren, 1901 – Argentina, Chile
- Gamakia Ramírez, 2003 – Chile
- Gayenna Nicolet, 1849 – Mexico, South America
- Gayennoides Ramírez, 2003 – Chile
- Hatitia Brescovit, 1997 – South America
- Hibana Brescovit, 1991 – North America, South America, Ascension Islands
- Iguarima Brescovit, 1997 – Brazil, Ecuador
- Ilocomba Brescovit, 1997 – Colombia
- Isigonia Simon, 1897 – Panama, Brazil, Peru, Venezuela
- Italaman Brescovit, 1997 – Argentina, Brazil, Colombia
- Jessica Brescovit, 1997 – South America
- Josa Keyserling, 1891 – Costa Rica, South America
- Katissa Brescovit, 1997 – Costa Rica, Panama, Ecuador, Peru, Lesser Antilles
- Lepajan Brescovit, 1993 – Panama, Ecuador
- Lupettiana Brescovit, 1997 – North America, Brazil
- Macrophyes O. Pickard-Cambridge, 1893 – Costa Rica, Panama, Mexico, South America
- Mesilla Simon, 1903 – Colombia, Ecuador, French Guiana
- Monapia Simon, 1897 – South America
- Negayan Ramírez, 2003 – Argentina, Chile, Peru, Falkland Islands
- Osoriella Mello-Leitão, 1922 – South America
- Otoniela Brescovit, 1997 – South America
- Oxysoma Nicolet, 1849 – Argentina, Brazil, Chile
- Patrera Simon, 1903 – Costa Rica, Guatemala, Panama, South America
- Phidyle Simon, 1880 – Chile
- Philisca Simon, 1884 – Argentina, Chile, Falkland Islands
- Pippuhana Brescovit, 1997 – Panama, Mexico, United States, Brazil
- Rathalos Lin & Li, 2022 – China
- Sanogasta Mello-Leitão, 1941 – South America. Introduced to Easter Islands
- Selknamia Ramírez, 2003 – Argentina, Chile
- Shuyushka Dupérré & Tapia, 2016 – Ecuador
- Sillus F. O. Pickard-Cambridge, 1900 – Costa Rica, Guatemala, Panama, Mexico, Brazil, French Guiana
- Sinophaena Lin & Li, 2021 – China
- Tafana Simon, 1903 – South America, Guayana
- Tasata Simon, 1903 – South America
- Temnida Simon, 1896 – South America
- Teudis O. Pickard-Cambridge, 1896 – Costa Rica, Guatemala, Panama, South America
- Thaloe Brescovit, 1993 – Caribbean, US Virgin Islands
- Timbuka Brescovit, 1997 – Costa Rica, Panama, Mexico, Bolivia, Colombia, Ecuador
- Tomopisthes Simon, 1884 – Argentina, Chile
- Umuara Brescovit, 1997 – Brazil, Peru, Venezuela
- Wulfila O. Pickard-Cambridge, 1895 – North America, Central America, South America
- Wulfilopsis Soares & Camargo, 1955 – Brazil
- Xiruana Brescovit, 1997 – South America
- Yagania Ramírez, Magalhaes, Lencinas & Pastur, 2026 – Tierra del Fuego
- Yinanyphaena Wang & Mi, 2026 – China, Taiwan
