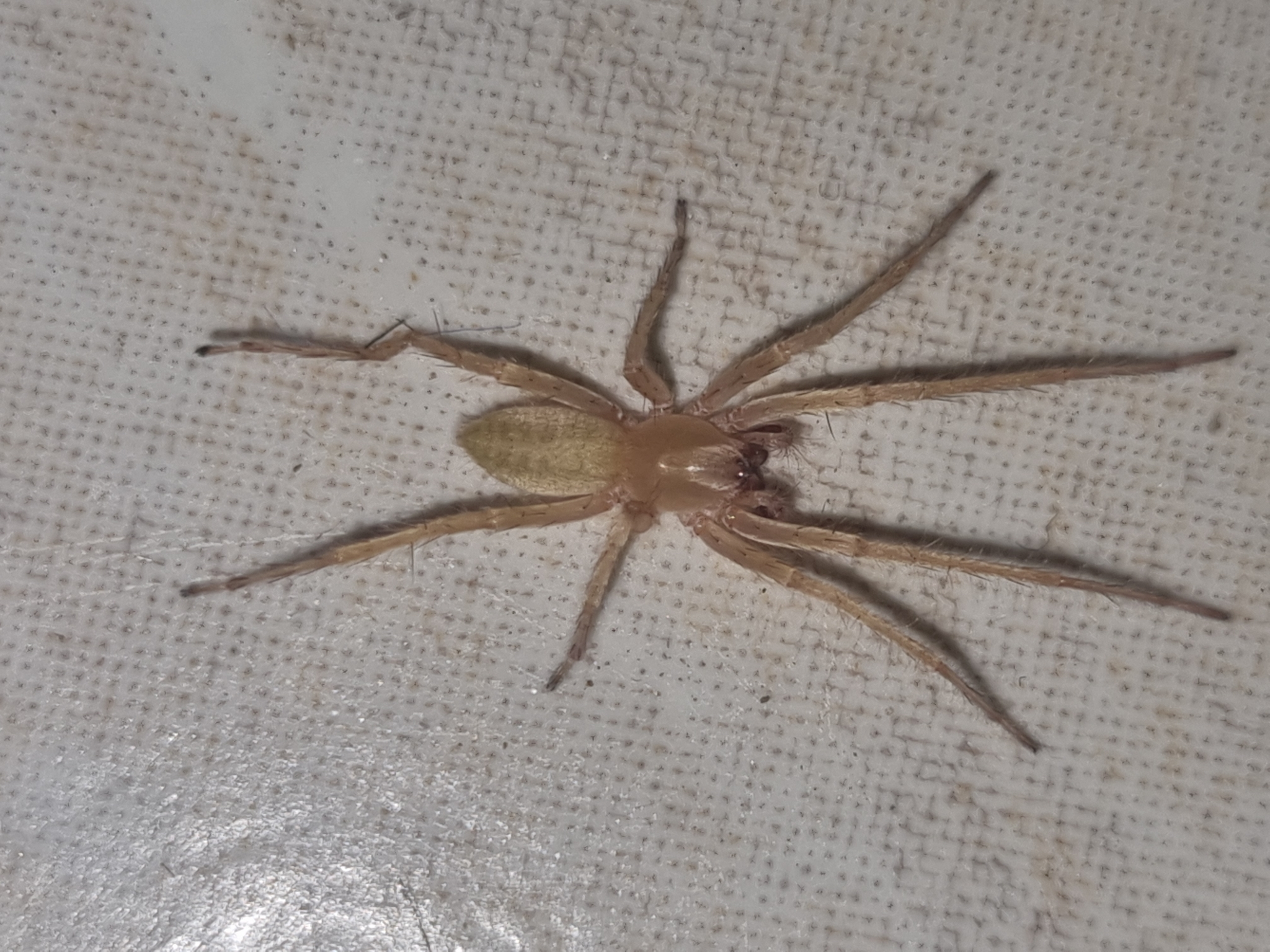

Scientific classification
- Kingdom: Animalia
- Phylum: Arthropoda
- Subphylum: Chelicerata
- Class: Arachnida
- Order: Araneae
- Infraorder: Araneomorphae
- Family: Anyphaenidae
- Genus: Xiruana; Brescovit, 1997

Type species
- X. gracilipes (Keyserling, 1891)

Species
- 17, see text

= Xiruana =

Genus of spiders

Xiruana is a genus of South American anyphaenid sac spiders first described by Antônio Brescovit in 1997.

== Species ==
As of October 2026, it contains 17 species. They include:

- Xiruana affinis (Mello-Leitão, 1922) – Brazil
- Xiruana ajuricaba Oliveira & Brescovit, 2015 – Brazil
- Xiruana aymara Oliveira & Brescovit, 2015 – Bolivia
- Xiruana bifida Oliveira & Brescovit, 2015 – Brazil, Paraguay
- Xiruana cocha Oliveira & Brescovit, 2015 – Peru
- Xiruana fiebrigi Oliveira & Brescovit, 2015 – Paraguay
- Xiruana gracilipes (Keyserling, 1891) – Brazil, Bolivia, Argentina
- Xiruana guaia Oliveira & Brescovit, 2015 – Brazil
- Xiruana hirsuta (Mello-Leitão, 1938) – Venezuela, Brazil, Paraguay, Argentina, Uruguay
- Xiruana jaboticabal Oliveira & Brescovit, 2015 – Brazil
- Xiruana lusitania Oliveira & Brescovit, 2015 – Brazil
- Xiruana minacu Oliveira & Brescovit, 2015 – Brazil
- Xiruana pocone Oliveira & Brescovit, 2015 – Brazil, Paraguay, Argentina
- Xiruana silarae Oliveira & Brescovit, 2015 – Brazil
- Xiruana tapirape Oliveira & Brescovit, 2015 – Brazil
- Xiruana tetraseta (Mello-Leitão, 1939) – Venezuela, Brazil, Paraguay
- Xiruana tribarrense Oliveira & Brescovit, 2015 – Brazil
