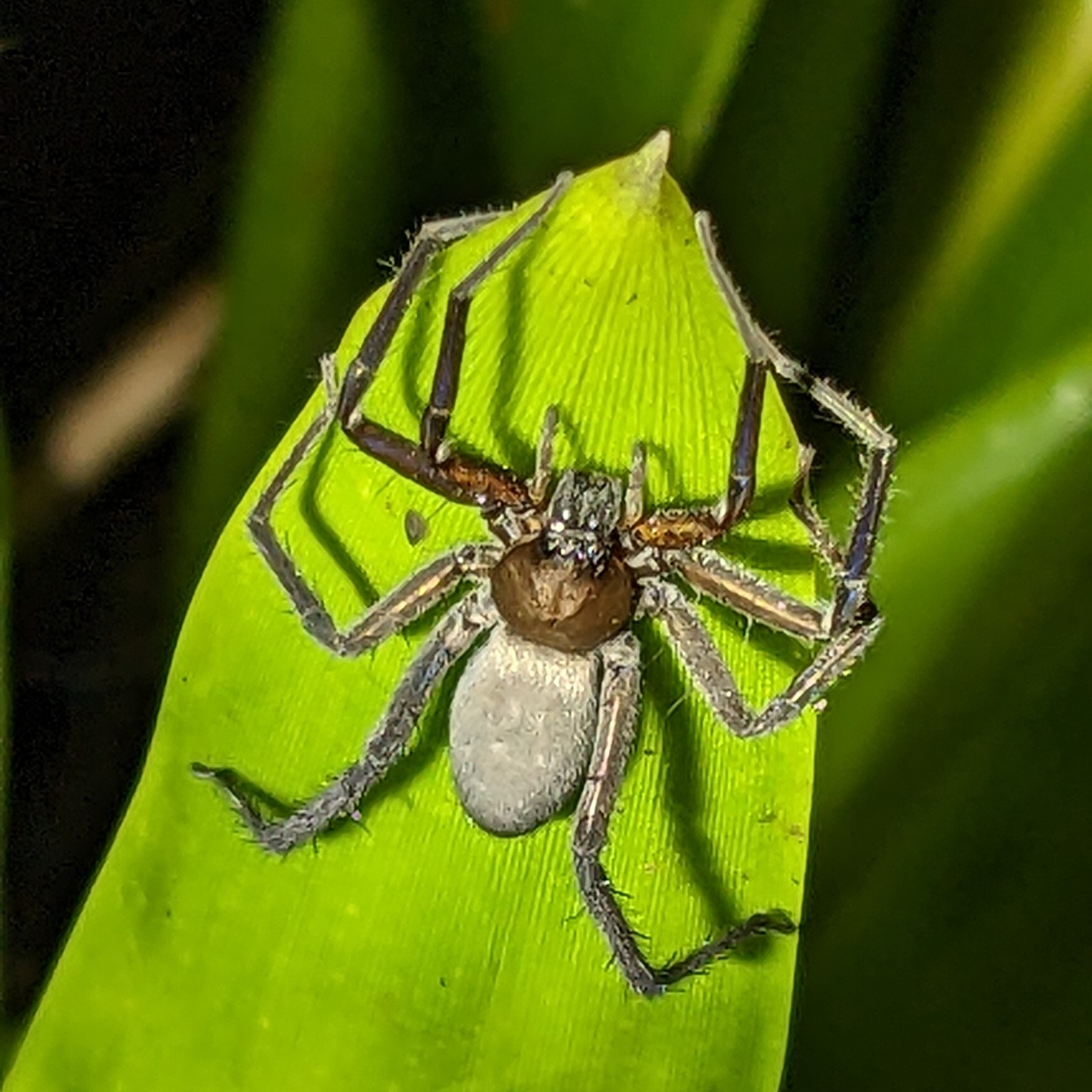
- Bromelina kochalkai

Scientific classification
- Kingdom: Animalia
- Phylum: Arthropoda
- Subphylum: Chelicerata
- Class: Arachnida
- Order: Araneae
- Infraorder: Araneomorphae
- Family: Anyphaenidae
- Genus: Bromelina; Brescovit, 1993

Type species
- B. oliola Brescovit, 1993

Species
- B. kochalkai Brescovit, 1993 – Colombia; B. oliola Brescovit, 1993 – Brazil; B. zuniala Brescovit, 1993 – Venezuela

= Bromelina =

Genus of spiders

Bromelina is a genus of South American anyphaenid sac spiders that was erected by Antônio Brescovit in 1993. As of October 2026 it contains only three species.
