= Lepajan =

Scientific classification
- Kingdom: Animalia
- Phylum: Arthropoda
- Subphylum: Chelicerata
- Class: Arachnida
- Order: Araneae
- Infraorder: Araneomorphae
- Family: Anyphaenidae
- Genus: Lepajan; Brescovit, 1993

Type species
- L. montanus (Chickering, 1940)

Species
- L. edwardsi Brescovit, 1997 – Ecuador; L. montanus (Chickering, 1940) – Panama

Genus of spiders

Lepajan is a genus of anyphaenid sac spiders first described by Antônio Brescovit in 1993.As of October 2026 it contains only two species.
