= Jessica (spider) =

Scientific classification
- Kingdom: Animalia
- Phylum: Arthropoda
- Subphylum: Chelicerata
- Class: Arachnida
- Order: Araneae
- Infraorder: Araneomorphae
- Family: Anyphaenidae
- Genus: Jessica; Brescovit, 1997

Species
- 12, see text

Genus of spiders

Jessica is a genus of South American anyphaenid sac spiders first described by Antônio Domingos Brescovit in 1997.

== Species ==
As of October 2026, this genus includes twelve species:

- Jessica campesina (Bauab-Vianna, 1979) – Brazil
- Jessica eden Brescovit, 1999 – Venezuela
- Jessica erythrostoma (Mello-Leitão, 1939) – Colombia to Argentina
- Jessica fidelis (Mello-Leitão, 1922) – Brazil, Bolivia, Paraguay, Argentina
- Jessica glabra (Keyserling, 1891) – Brazil, Paraguay, Argentina
- Jessica itatiaia Brescovit, 1999 – Brazil
- Jessica osoriana (Mello-Leitão, 1922) – Brazil, Paraguay, Argentina (type species)
- Jessica pachecoi Brescovit, 1999 – Brazil
- Jessica puava Brescovit, 1999 – Brazil
- Jessica rafaeli Brescovit, 1999 – Brazil
- Jessica renneri Brescovit, 1999 – Brazil
- Jessica sergipana Brescovit, 1999 – Brazil
