= Otoniela =

Scientific classification
- Kingdom: Animalia
- Phylum: Arthropoda
- Subphylum: Chelicerata
- Class: Arachnida
- Order: Araneae
- Infraorder: Araneomorphae
- Family: Anyphaenidae
- Genus: Otoniela; Brescovit, 1997

Type species
- O. adisi Brescovit, 1997

Species
- 8, see text

Genus of spiders

Otoniela is a genus of South American anyphaenid sac spiders first described by Antônio Brescovit in 1997.

== Species ==
As of October 2026 it contains eight species:

- O. adisi Brescovit, 1997 — Peru, Brazil
- O. aparecida Oliveira, Alvarenga & Brescovit, 2023 — Brazil
- O. chica Oliveira, Alvarenga & Brescovit, 2023 — Argentina
- O. duovizinhensis Oliveira, Alvarenga & Brescovit, 2023 — Brazil, Argentina
- O. lupercioi Oliveira, Alvarenga & Brescovit, 2023 — Brazil, Paraguay, Argentina
- O. negrinho Oliveira, Alvarenga & Brescovit, 2023 — Brazil
- O. quadrivittata (Simon, 1897) — Venazuela, Argentina
- O. tigre Oliveira, Alvarenga & Brescovit, 2023 — Brazil, Argentina
