= Iguarima =

Scientific classification
- Kingdom: Animalia
- Phylum: Arthropoda
- Subphylum: Chelicerata
- Class: Arachnida
- Order: Araneae
- Infraorder: Araneomorphae
- Family: Anyphaenidae
- Genus: Iguarima; Brescovit, 1997

Type species
- I. censoria (Keyserling, 1891)

Species
- I. censoria (Keyserling, 1891) – Brazil; I. pichincha Brescovit, 1997 – Ecuador

Genus of spiders

Iguarima is a genus of South American anyphaenid sac spiders first described by Antônio Brescovit in 1997.As of October 2026 it contains only two species.
