= Italaman =

Scientific classification
- Kingdom: Animalia
- Phylum: Arthropoda
- Subphylum: Chelicerata
- Class: Arachnida
- Order: Araneae
- Infraorder: Araneomorphae
- Family: Anyphaenidae
- Genus: Italaman; Brescovit, 1997
- Species: I. santamaria

Binomial name
- Italaman santamaria Brescovit, 1997

Genus of spiders

Italaman is a genus of South American anyphaenid sac spiders containing the single species, Italaman santamaria. It was first described by Antônio Brescovit in 1997, and has only been found in Colombia, Brazil, and Argentina.
