= Buckupiella =

Scientific classification
- Kingdom: Animalia
- Phylum: Arthropoda
- Subphylum: Chelicerata
- Class: Arachnida
- Order: Araneae
- Infraorder: Araneomorphae
- Family: Anyphaenidae
- Genus: Buckupiella; Brescovit, 1997
- Species: B. imperatriz

Binomial name
- Buckupiella imperatriz Brescovit, 1997

Genus of spiders

Buckupiella is a genus of South American anyphaenid sac spiders containing the single species, Buckupiella imperatriz. It was first described by Antônio Brescovit in 1997, and has only been found in Brazil and Argentina. This genus is named after the Brazilian arachnologist species:Erica Helena Buckup.
