= Rathalos (spider) =

Scientific classification
- Kingdom: Animalia
- Phylum: Arthropoda
- Subphylum: Chelicerata
- Class: Arachnida
- Order: Araneae
- Infraorder: Araneomorphae
- Family: Anyphaenidae
- Genus: Rathalos; Lin & Li, 2021

Type species
- R. xiushanensis Lin & Li, 2021

Species
- 2, see text

Genus of spiders

Rathalos is a genus of Chinese anyphaenid sac spiders first described by Lin & Li, 2021.

== Species ==
As of October 2026 it contains two species:

- Rathalos treecko (Lin & Li, 2021) – China
- Rathalos xiushanensis (Song & Zhu, 1991)) – China
