= Umuara =

Scientific classification
- Kingdom: Animalia
- Phylum: Arthropoda
- Subphylum: Chelicerata
- Class: Arachnida
- Order: Araneae
- Infraorder: Araneomorphae
- Family: Anyphaenidae
- Genus: Umuara; Brescovit, 1997

Type species
- U. fasciata (Blackwall, 1862)

Species
- 6, see text

Genus of spiders

Umuara is a genus of South American anyphaenid sac spiders first described by Antônio Brescovit in 1997.

== Species ==
As of October 2026 it contains six species:

- Umuara fasciata (Blackwall, 1862) – Venezuela, Brazil
- Umuara freddyi Oliveira & Brescovit, 2015 – Brazil
- Umuara junin Brescovit, 1997 – Peru
- Umuara juquia Brescovit, 1997 – Brazil
- Umuara pydanieli Brescovit, 1997 – Brazil
- Umuara xingo Oliveira & Brescovit, 2015 – Brazil
