= Timbuka =

Scientific classification
- Kingdom: Animalia
- Phylum: Arthropoda
- Subphylum: Chelicerata
- Class: Arachnida
- Order: Araneae
- Infraorder: Araneomorphae
- Family: Anyphaenidae
- Genus: Timbuka; Brescovit, 1997

Type species
- T. boquete Brescovit, 1997

Species
- 6, see text

Genus of spiders

Timbuka is a genus of anyphaenid sac spiders first described by Antônio Brescovit in 1997.

== Species ==
As of October 2026 it contains six species:

- Timbuka bogotensis (L. Koch, 1866) – Colombia, Bolivia
- Timbuka boquete Brescovit, 1997 – Costa Rica, Panama, Colombia
- Timbuka granadensis (Keyserling, 1879) – Colombia
- Timbuka larvata (O. Pickard-Cambridge, 1896) – Mexico
- Timbuka masseneti (Berland, 1913) – Ecuador
- Timbuka meridiana (L. Koch, 1866) – Colombia
