= Thaloe =

Scientific classification
- Kingdom: Animalia
- Phylum: Arthropoda
- Subphylum: Chelicerata
- Class: Arachnida
- Order: Araneae
- Infraorder: Araneomorphae
- Family: Anyphaenidae
- Genus: Thaloe; Brescovit, 1993

Type species
- T. remotus (Bryant, 1948)

Species
- 6, see text

Genus of spiders

Thaloe is a genus of Caribbean anyphaenid sac spiders first described by Antônio Brescovit in 1993.

== Species ==
As of October 2026 it contains six species:

- T. ebano Brescovit & Oliveira, 2019 — Dominican Republic
- T. ennery Brescovit, 1993 — Hispaniola
- T. leboulet Brescovit & Oliveira, 2019 — Haiti
- T. maricao Brescovit & Oliveira, 2019 — Puerto Rico, US Virgin Islands
- T. remotus (Bryant, 1948) — Hispaniola
- T. tricuspis (Bryant, 1948) — Cuba
