= Ferrieria =

Scientific classification
- Domain: Eukaryota
- Kingdom: Animalia
- Phylum: Arthropoda
- Subphylum: Chelicerata
- Class: Arachnida
- Order: Araneae
- Infraorder: Araneomorphae
- Family: Anyphaenidae
- Genus: Ferrieria
- Species: F. echinata

Binomial name
- Ferrieria echinata Tullgren, 1901

Synonyms
- Terupis

Genus of spiders

Ferrieria is a genus of South American anyphaenid sac spiders containing the single species, Ferrieria echinata. It was first described by Albert Tullgren in 1901, and has only been found in Chile and Argentina.
