= Osoriella =

Scientific classification
- Kingdom: Animalia
- Phylum: Arthropoda
- Subphylum: Chelicerata
- Class: Arachnida
- Order: Araneae
- Infraorder: Araneomorphae
- Family: Anyphaenidae
- Genus: Osoriella; Mello-Leitão, 1922

Type species
- O. rubella (Keyserling, 1891)

Species
- 3, see text

Genus of spiders

Osoriella is a genus of South American anyphaenid sac spiders first described by Cândido Firmino de Mello-Leitão in 1922.

== Species ==
As of October 2026 it contains three species:

- Osoriella domingos Brescovit, 1998 – Brazil
- Osoriella rubella (Keyserling, 1891) – Brazil
- Osoriella tahela Brescovit, 1998 – Peru, Brazil, Bolivia, Paraguay, Argentina
