= Selknamia =

Scientific classification
- Kingdom: Animalia
- Phylum: Arthropoda
- Subphylum: Chelicerata
- Class: Arachnida
- Order: Araneae
- Infraorder: Araneomorphae
- Family: Anyphaenidae
- Genus: Selknamia
- Species: S. minima

Binomial name
- Selknamia minima Ramírez, 2003

Genus of spiders

Selknamia is a genus of South American anyphaenid sac spiders containing the single species, Selknamia minima. It was first described by M. J. Ramírez in 2003, and has only been found in Chile and Argentina.
