= Pippuhana =

Scientific classification
- Kingdom: Animalia
- Phylum: Arthropoda
- Subphylum: Chelicerata
- Class: Arachnida
- Order: Araneae
- Infraorder: Araneomorphae
- Family: Anyphaenidae
- Genus: Pippuhana; Brescovit, 1997

Type species
- P. gandu Brescovit, 1997

Species
- 4, see text

Genus of spiders

Pippuhana is a genus of anyphaenid sac spiders first described by Antônio Brescovit in 1997.

== Species ==
As of October 2026, this genus includes four species:

- Pippuhana calcar (Bryant, 1931) – United States, Mexico
- Pippuhana donaldi (Chickering, 1940) – Panama
- Pippuhana gandu Brescovit, 1997 – Brazil (type species)
- Pippuhana unicolor (Keyserling, 1891) – Brazil
