= Aysenia =

Scientific classification
- Kingdom: Animalia
- Phylum: Arthropoda
- Subphylum: Chelicerata
- Class: Arachnida
- Order: Araneae
- Infraorder: Araneomorphae
- Family: Anyphaenidae
- Genus: Aysenia; Tullgren, 1902

Type species
- A. elongata Tullgren, 1902

Species
- 9, see text

Genus of spiders

Aysenia is a genus of South American anyphaenid sac spiders first described by Albert Tullgren in 1902.

== Species ==
As of October 2026 it contains nine species from Chile and Argentina:

- Aysenia araucana Ramírez, 2003 – Chile
- Aysenia barrigai Izquierdo & Ramírez, 2008 – Chile, Argentina
- Aysenia cylindrica Ramírez, 2003 – Chile, Argentina
- Aysenia elongata Tullgren, 1902 – Chile, Argentina
- Aysenia grismadoi González & Ramírez, 2012 – Chile
- Aysenia huayun González & Ramírez, 2012 – Chile
- Aysenia izquierdoi González & Ramírez, 2012 – Chile
- Aysenia paposo Laborda, Ramírez & Pizarro-Araya, 2013 – Chile
- Aysenia segestrioides Ramírez, 2003 – Chile
