= Sanogasta =

Scientific classification
- Kingdom: Animalia
- Phylum: Arthropoda
- Subphylum: Chelicerata
- Class: Arachnida
- Order: Araneae
- Infraorder: Araneomorphae
- Family: Anyphaenidae
- Genus: Sanogasta; Mello-Leitão, 1941

Type species
- S. maculatipes (Keyserling, 1878)

Species
- 15, see text

Genus of spiders

Sanogasta is a genus of South American anyphaenid sac spiders first described by Cândido Firmino de Mello-Leitão in 1941.

== Species ==
As of October 2026 it contains fifteen species:

- Sanogasta alticola (Simon, 1896) — Peru, Bolivia, Argentina
- Sanogasta approximata (Tullgren, 1901) — Chile, Argentina
- Sanogasta backhauseni (Simon, 1895) — Chile, Argentina, Uruguay
  - Sanogasta b. patagonicus (Simon, 1905) — Argentina
- Sanogasta bonariensis (Mello-Leitão, 1940) — Argentina
- Sanogasta maculatipes (Keyserling, 1878) — Peru, Bolivia, Brazil, Uruguay, Argentina, Chile. Introduced to Easter Is.
- Sanogasta maculosa (Nicolet, 1849) — Chile, Argentina, Juan Fernandez Is.
- Sanogasta mandibularis Ramírez, 2003 — Argentina, Paraguay
- Sanogasta minuta (Keyserling, 1891) — Brazil, Argentina
- Sanogasta paucilineata (Mello-Leitão, 1945) — Argentina
- Sanogasta pehuenche Ramírez, 2003 — Chile, Argentina
- Sanogasta puma Ramírez, 2003 — Brazil, Uruguay, Argentina
- Sanogasta rufithorax (Tullgren, 1902) — Chile
- Sanogasta tenuis Ramírez, 2003 — Brazil, Argentina
- Sanogasta x-signata (Keyserling, 1891) — Brazil, Uruguay, Argentina
