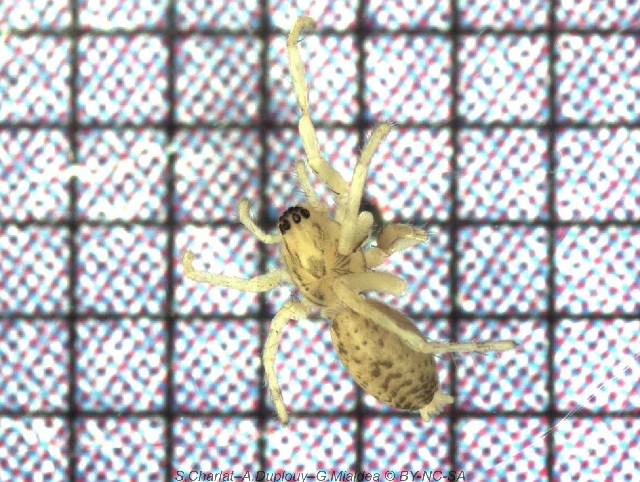
- A. zimmermani

Scientific classification
- Kingdom: Animalia
- Phylum: Arthropoda
- Subphylum: Chelicerata
- Class: Arachnida
- Order: Araneae
- Infraorder: Araneomorphae
- Family: Anyphaenidae
- Genus: Australaena; Berland, 1942

Type species
- A. hystricina Berland, 1942

Species
- A. hystricina Berland, 1942 – French Polynesia (Austral Is.); A. zimmermani Berland, 1942 – French Polynesia (Society Is.: Tahiti)

= Australaena =

Genus of spiders

Australaena is a genus of anyphaenid sac spiders first described by Lucien Berland in 1942. As of October 2026 it contains only two species.
