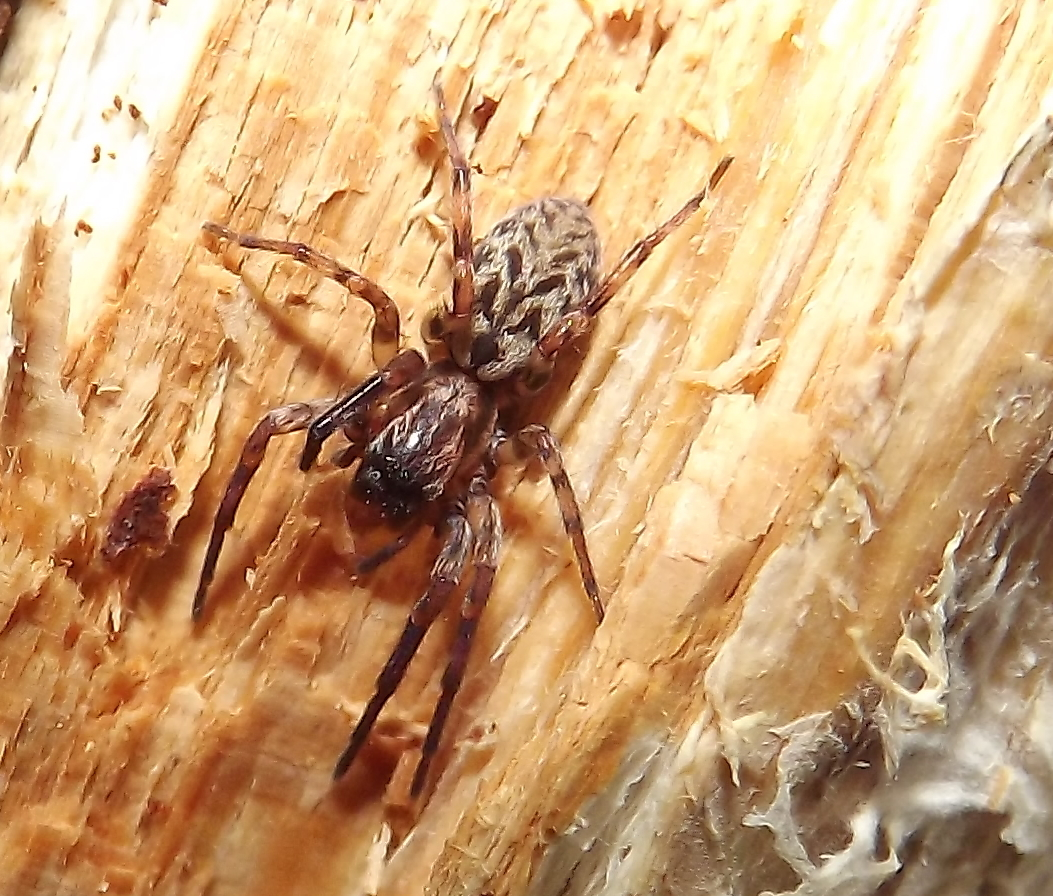

Scientific classification
- Kingdom: Animalia
- Phylum: Arthropoda
- Subphylum: Chelicerata
- Class: Arachnida
- Order: Araneae
- Infraorder: Araneomorphae
- Family: Anyphaenidae
- Genus: Axyracrus
- Species: A. elegans

Binomial name
- Axyracrus elegans Simon, 1884

Synonyms
- Schiapellia

= Axyracrus =

Genus of spiders

Axyracrus is a genus of South American anyphaenid sac spiders containing the single species, Axyracrus elegans. It was first described by Eugène Simon in 1884, and has only been found in Chile and Argentina. It is a senior synonym of "Schiapellia"
