= Gayenna =

Scientific classification
- Kingdom: Animalia
- Phylum: Arthropoda
- Subphylum: Chelicerata
- Class: Arachnida
- Order: Araneae
- Infraorder: Araneomorphae
- Family: Anyphaenidae
- Genus: Gayenna; Nicolet, 1849

Type species
- G. americana Nicolet, 1849

Species
- 9, see text

Synonyms
- Mezenina

Genus of spiders

Gayenna is a genus of anyphaenid sac spiders first described by H. Nicolet in 1849.

== Species ==
As of October 2026 it contains nine species:

- Gayenna americana Nicolet, 1849 – Chile, Argentina
- Gayenna brasiliensis Roewer, 1951 – Brazil
- Gayenna chrysophila Mello-Leitão, 1926 – Brazil
- Gayenna furcata (Keyserling, 1879) – Peru
- Gayenna ignava Banks, 1898 – Mexico
- Gayenna moreirae (Mello-Leitão, 1915) – Brazil
- Gayenna orizaba Banks, 1898 – Mexico
- Gayenna trivittata (Bertkau, 1880) – Brazil
- Gayenna vittata (Keyserling, 1881) – Peru
