= Negayan =

Scientific classification
- Kingdom: Animalia
- Phylum: Arthropoda
- Subphylum: Chelicerata
- Class: Arachnida
- Order: Araneae
- Infraorder: Araneomorphae
- Family: Anyphaenidae
- Genus: Negayan; Ramírez, 2003

Type species
- N. tridentata (Simon, 1886)

Species
- 12, see text

Genus of spiders

Negayan is a genus of South American anyphaenid sac spiders first described by M. J. Ramírez in 2003.

== Species ==
As of October 2026 it contains twelve species:

- Negayan ancha Lopardo, 2005 – Chile, Argentina
- Negayan argentina Lopardo, 2005 – Argentina
- Negayan cerronegro Lopardo, 2005 – Argentina
- Negayan coccinea (Mello-Leitão, 1943) – Argentina
- Negayan enrollada Lopardo, 2005 – Chile, Argentina
- Negayan excepta (Tullgren, 1901) – Chile, Argentina
- Negayan paduana (Karsch, 1880) – Chile, Argentina, Falkland Is.
- Negayan puno Lopardo, 2005 – Peru, Argentina
- Negayan tarapaca Lopardo, 2005 – Peru, Chile
- Negayan tata Lopardo, 2005 – Chile, Argentina
- Negayan tridentata (Simon, 1886) – Argentina
- Negayan tucuman Lopardo, 2005 – Argentina
