= Teudis =

Scientific classification
- Kingdom: Animalia
- Phylum: Arthropoda
- Subphylum: Chelicerata
- Class: Arachnida
- Order: Araneae
- Infraorder: Araneomorphae
- Family: Anyphaenidae
- Genus: Teudis; O. Pickard-Cambridge, 1896

Type species
- T. geminus Petrunkevitch, 1911

Species
- 20, see text

Genus of spiders

Teudis is a genus of anyphaenid sac spiders first described by O. Pickard-Cambridge in 1896.

== Species ==
As of October 2026 it contains twenty species:

- Teudis angusticeps (Keyserling, 1891) – Brazil
- Teudis atrofasciatus Mello-Leitão, 1922 – Brazil
- Teudis bicornutus (Tullgren, 1905) – Bolivia
- Teudis buelowae (Mello-Leitão, 1946) – Paraguay
- Teudis cambridgei Chickering, 1940 – Panama
- Teudis comstocki (Soares & Camargo, 1948) – Brazil
- Teudis cordobensis Mello-Leitão, 1941 – Argentina
- Teudis dichotomus Mello-Leitão, 1929 – Brazil
- Teudis formosus (Keyserling, 1891) – Brazil
- Teudis gastrotaeniatus Mello-Leitão, 1944 – Argentina
- Teudis geminus Petrunkevitch, 1911 – Guatemala, Costa Rica, Panama, Ecuador
- Teudis griseus (Keyserling, 1891) – Brazil
- Teudis juradoi Chickering, 1940 – Panama
- Teudis lenis (Keyserling, 1891) – Brazil
- Teudis morenus (Mello-Leitão, 1941) – Argentina
- Teudis parvulus (Keyserling, 1891) – Brazil
- Teudis peragrans (O. Pickard-Cambridge, 1898) – Guatemala, Brazil
- Teudis roseus F. O. Pickard-Cambridge, 1900 – Panama
- Teudis suspiciosus (Keyserling, 1891) – Brazil
- Teudis ypsilon Mello-Leitão, 1922 – Brazil
