= Monapia =

Scientific classification
- Kingdom: Animalia
- Phylum: Arthropoda
- Subphylum: Chelicerata
- Class: Arachnida
- Order: Araneae
- Infraorder: Araneomorphae
- Family: Anyphaenidae
- Genus: Monapia; Simon, 1897

Type species
- M. dilaticollis (Nicolet, 1849)

Species
- 13, see text

Genus of spiders

Monapia is a genus of South American anyphaenid sac spiders first described by Eugène Simon in 1897.

== Species ==
As of October 2026 it contains thirteen species:

- Monapia alupuran Ramírez, 1995 — Chile
- Monapia angusta (Mello-Leitão, 1944) — Uruguay, Argentina
- Monapia carolina Ramírez, 1999 — Argentina
- Monapia charrua Ramírez, 1999 — Uruguay, Argentina
- Monapia dilaticollis (Nicolet, 1849) — Chile, Argentina, Juan Fernandez Is.
- Monapia fierro Ramírez, 1999 — Argentina
- Monapia guenoana Ramírez, 1999 — Uruguay, Argentina
- Monapia huaria Ramírez, 1995 — Chile
- Monapia lutea (Nicolet, 1849) — Chile, Argentina
- Monapia pichinahuel Ramírez, 1995 — Chile, Argentina
- Monapia silvatica Ramírez, 1995 — Chile, Argentina
- Monapia tandil Ramírez, 1999 — Argentina
- Monapia vittata (Simon, 1884) — Chile, Argentina
