= Aljassa =

Scientific classification
- Kingdom: Animalia
- Phylum: Arthropoda
- Subphylum: Chelicerata
- Class: Arachnida
- Order: Araneae
- Infraorder: Araneomorphae
- Family: Anyphaenidae
- Genus: Aljassa; Brescovit, 1997

Type species
- A. annulipes (Caporiacco, 1955)

Species
- 5, see text

Genus of spiders

Aljassa is a genus of South American anyphaenid sac spiders first described by Antônio Brescovit in 1997.

== Species ==
As of October 2026 it contains five species:

- Aljassa annulipes (Caporiacco, 1955) – Venezuela
- Aljassa notata (Keyserling, 1881) – Peru
- Aljassa poicila (Chamberlin, 1916) – Peru
- Aljassa subpallida (L. Koch, 1866) – Colombia
- Aljassa venezuelica (Caporiacco, 1955) – Venezuela
