= Sinophaena =

Scientific classification
- Kingdom: Animalia
- Phylum: Arthropoda
- Subphylum: Chelicerata
- Class: Arachnida
- Order: Araneae
- Infraorder: Araneomorphae
- Family: Anyphaenidae
- Genus: Sinophaena; Lin & Li, 2021

Type species
- S. xiweni Lin & Li, 2021

Species
- Sinophaena bivalva (Zhang & Song, 2004); Sinophaena xiweni Lin & Li, 2021

Genus of spiders

Sinophaena is a small genus of east Asian anyphaenid sac spiders. It was first described by Y. J. Lin, Yuri M. Marusik and C. X. Gao in 2021. Its two described species are endemic to China.

== Species ==
As of October 2026, this genus includes two species:

- Sinophaena bivalva (Zhang & Song, 2004) – China
- Sinophaena xiweni Lin & Li, 2021 – China
