= Phidyle =

Scientific classification
- Kingdom: Animalia
- Phylum: Arthropoda
- Subphylum: Chelicerata
- Class: Arachnida
- Order: Araneae
- Infraorder: Araneomorphae
- Family: Anyphaenidae
- Genus: Phidyle; Simon, 1880
- Species: P. punctipes

Binomial name
- Phidyle punctipes Simon, 1880

Genus of spiders

Phidyle is a genus of South American anyphaenid sac spiders containing the single species, Phidyle punctipes. It was first described by Eugène Simon in 1880, and has only been found in Chile.
