= Philisca =

Scientific classification
- Kingdom: Animalia
- Phylum: Arthropoda
- Subphylum: Chelicerata
- Class: Arachnida
- Order: Araneae
- Infraorder: Araneomorphae
- Family: Anyphaenidae
- Genus: Philisca; Simon, 1884

Type species
- P. hahni Simon, 1884

Species
- 14, see text

Synonyms
- Liparotoma

Genus of spiders

Philisca is a genus of South American anyphaenid sac spiders first described by Eugène Simon in 1884.

== Species ==
As of October 2026 it contains fourteen species:

- Philisca accentifera Simon, 1904 – Chile, Argentina
- Philisca amaena (Simon, 1884) – Chile, Argentina
- Philisca atrata Soto & Ramírez, 2012 – Chile, Argentina
- Philisca doilu (Ramírez, 1993) – Chile, Argentina
- Philisca hahni Simon, 1884 – Chile, Argentina
- Philisca huapi Ramírez, 2003 – Chile, Argentina
- Philisca hyadesi (Simon, 1884) – Chile, Argentina
- Philisca ingens Berland, 1924 – Chile (Juan Fernandez Is.)
- Philisca ornata Berland, 1924 – Chile (Juan Fernandez Is.)
- Philisca pizarroi Soto & Ramírez, 2012 – Chile (Juan Fernandez Is.)
- Philisca robinson Soto & Ramírez, 2012 – Chile (Juan Fernandez Is.)
- Philisca robusta Soto & Ramírez, 2012 – Chile (Juan Fernandez Is.)
- Philisca tripunctata (Nicolet, 1849) – Chile, Argentina, Falkland Is.
- Philisca viernes Soto & Ramírez, 2012 – Chile (Juan Fernandez Is.)
