= Anyphaenoides =

Anyphaenoides Temporal range: Neogene–present

Scientific classification
- Kingdom: Animalia
- Phylum: Arthropoda
- Subphylum: Chelicerata
- Class: Arachnida
- Order: Araneae
- Infraorder: Araneomorphae
- Family: Anyphaenidae
- Genus: Anyphaenoides; Berland, 1913

Type species
- A. pluridentata Berland, 1913

Species
- 20, see text

Synonyms
- Quechuella

Genus of spiders

Anyphaenoides is a genus of anyphaenid sac spiders first described by Lucien Berland in 1913. It is a senior synonym of "Quechuella"

== Species ==
As of October 2026 it contains twenty species from Central and South America:

- Anyphaenoides brescoviti Baert, 1995 – Peru
- Anyphaenoides caribensis Martínez, Brescovit & Martinez, 2018 – Colombia
- Anyphaenoides clavipes (Mello-Leitão, 1922) – Brazil, Argentina
- Anyphaenoides cocos Baert, 1995 – Costa Rica (Cocos Is.)
- Anyphaenoides coddingtoni Brescovit, 1998 – Brazil, Bolivia
- Anyphaenoides enigmatica Martínez, Brescovit & Martinez, 2018 – Colombia
- Anyphaenoides foreroi Martínez, Brescovit & Martinez, 2018 – Colombia
- Anyphaenoides hilli Martínez, Brescovit & Martinez, 2018 – Colombia
- Anyphaenoides irusa Brescovit, 1992 – Venezuela, Suriname, Leeward Antilles
- Anyphaenoides katiae Baert, 1995 – Ecuador (Galapagos Is.)
- Anyphaenoides locksae Brescovit & Ramos, 2003 – Brazil
- Anyphaenoides octodentata (Schmidt, 1971) – Venezuela, Ecuador, Peru, Galapagos Is.
- Anyphaenoides pacifica (Banks, 1902) – Trinidad to Chile, Galapagos Is.
- Anyphaenoides placens (O. Pickard-Cambridge, 1896) – Panama, Venezuela
- Anyphaenoides pluridentata Berland, 1913 – Ecuador
- Anyphaenoides samiria Brescovit, 1998 – Peru
- Anyphaenoides sialha Brescovit, 1992 – Peru
- Anyphaenoides sierraensis Martínez, Brescovit & Martinez, 2018 – Colombia
- Anyphaenoides volcan Brescovit, 1998 – Panama
- Anyphaenoides xiboreninho Brescovit, 1998 – Brazil
