= Oxysoma =

Scientific classification
- Kingdom: Animalia
- Phylum: Arthropoda
- Subphylum: Chelicerata
- Class: Arachnida
- Order: Araneae
- Infraorder: Araneomorphae
- Family: Anyphaenidae
- Genus: Oxysoma; Nicolet, 1849

Type species
- O. punctatum Nicolet, 1849

Species
- 8, see text

Synonyms
- Aporatea

Genus of spiders

Oxysoma is a genus of South American anyphaenid sac spiders first described by H. Nicolet in 1849.

== Species ==
As of October 2026 it contains eight species:

- Oxysoma chiloensis (Ramírez, 2003) – Chile, Argentina
- Oxysoma itambezinho Ramírez, 2003 – Brazil
- Oxysoma kuni Aisen & Ramírez, 2015 – Chile
- Oxysoma longiventre (Nicolet, 1849) – Chile, Argentina
- Oxysoma losruiles Aisen & Ramírez, 2015 – Chile
- Oxysoma macrocuspis Aisen & Ramírez, 2015 – Chile
- Oxysoma punctatum Nicolet, 1849 – Chile, Argentina
- Oxysoma saccatum (Tullgren, 1902) – Chile, Argentina
