= Acanthoceto =

Scientific classification
- Kingdom: Animalia
- Phylum: Arthropoda
- Subphylum: Chelicerata
- Class: Arachnida
- Order: Araneae
- Infraorder: Araneomorphae
- Family: Anyphaenidae
- Genus: Acanthoceto; Mello-Leitão, 1944

Type species
- A. acupicta (Nicolet, 1849)

Species
- 7, see text

Genus of spiders

Acanthoceto is a genus of South American anyphaenid sac spiders first described by Cândido Firmino de Mello-Leitão in 1944.

== Species ==
As of October 2026, this genus includes seven species:

- Acanthoceto acupicta (Nicolet, 1849) – Chile, Argentina, Uruguay, Brazil
- Acanthoceto cinerea (Tullgren, 1901) – Chile, Argentina
- Acanthoceto ladormida Ramírez, 1997 – Chile
- Acanthoceto marina Ramírez, 1997 – Chile
- Acanthoceto pichi Ramírez, 1997 – Chile, Argentina
- Acanthoceto riogrande Ramírez, 1997 – Brazil, Argentina
- Acanthoceto septentrionalis (Berland, 1913) – Colombia, Ecuador
