= Coptoprepes =

Scientific classification
- Kingdom: Animalia
- Phylum: Arthropoda
- Subphylum: Chelicerata
- Class: Arachnida
- Order: Araneae
- Infraorder: Araneomorphae
- Family: Anyphaenidae
- Genus: Coptoprepes; Simon, 1884

Type species
- C. flavopilosus Simon, 1884

Species
- 12, see text

Genus of spiders

Coptoprepes is a genus of South American anyphaenid sac spiders first described by Eugène Simon in 1884.

== Species ==
As of October 2026 it contains twelve species:

- Coptoprepes bellavista Werenkraut & Ramírez, 2009 – Chile
- Coptoprepes campanensis Ramírez, 2003 – Chile
- Coptoprepes casablanca Werenkraut & Ramírez, 2009 – Chile, Argentina
- Coptoprepes contulmo Werenkraut & Ramírez, 2009 – Chile
- Coptoprepes ecotono Werenkraut & Ramírez, 2009 – Chile, Argentina
- Coptoprepes eden Werenkraut & Ramírez, 2009 – Chile
- Coptoprepes flavopilosus Simon, 1884 – Chile, Argentina
- Coptoprepes laudani Barone, Werenkraut & Ramírez, 2016 – Chile, Argentina
- Coptoprepes nahuelbuta Ramírez, 2003 – Chile
- Coptoprepes recinto Werenkraut & Ramírez, 2009 – Chile
- Coptoprepes valdiviensis Ramírez, 2003 – Chile, Argentina
- Coptoprepes variegatus Mello-Leitão, 1940 – Argentina
