= Gamakia =

Scientific classification
- Kingdom: Animalia
- Phylum: Arthropoda
- Subphylum: Chelicerata
- Class: Arachnida
- Order: Araneae
- Infraorder: Araneomorphae
- Family: Anyphaenidae
- Genus: Gamakia; Ramírez, 2003
- Species: G. hirsuta

Binomial name
- Gamakia hirsuta Ramírez, 2003

Genus of spiders

Gamakia is a genus of South American anyphaenid sac spiders containing the single species, Gamakia hirsuta. It was first described by M. J. Ramírez in 2003, and has only been found in Chile.
