= Aysha (spider) =

Scientific classification
- Kingdom: Animalia
- Phylum: Arthropoda
- Subphylum: Chelicerata
- Class: Arachnida
- Order: Araneae
- Infraorder: Araneomorphae
- Family: Anyphaenidae
- Genus: Aysha; Keyserling, 1891

Type species
- A. prospera Keyserling, 1891

Species
- 40, see text

Genus of spiders

Aysha is a genus of anyphaenid sac spiders first described by Eugen von Keyserling in 1891. They are often called "sac spiders" because of the dwellings that they create for themselves to take shelter in. As is true with most other spiders, the pedipalps of the males are much larger than those of the females. They are found throughout South America up to Panama.

== Species ==
As of October 2026 it contains forty species:

- Aysha affinis (Blackwall, 1862) – Brazil
- Aysha albovittata Mello-Leitão, 1944 – Brazil, Argentina
- Aysha basilisca (Mello-Leitão, 1922) – Brazil
- Aysha bonaldoi Brescovit, 1992 – Brazil
- Aysha boraceia Brescovit, 1992 – Brazil
- Aysha borgmeyeri (Mello-Leitão, 1926) – Brazil, Argentina
- Aysha brevimana (C. L. Koch, 1839) – Brazil
- Aysha caxambuensis (Mello-Leitão, 1926) – Brazil, Paraguay, Argentina
- Aysha chicama Brescovit, 1992 – Brazil
- Aysha clarovittata (Keyserling, 1891) – Brazil, Argentina
- Aysha curumim Brescovit, 1992 – Brazil
- Aysha diversicolor (Keyserling, 1891) – Brazil
- Aysha ericae Brescovit, 1992 – Brazil, Argentina
- Aysha fortis (Keyserling, 1891) – Brazil
- Aysha guaiba Brescovit, 1992 – Brazil
- Aysha guarapuava Brescovit, 1992 – Brazil
- Aysha helvola (Keyserling, 1891) – Brazil
- Aysha heraldica (Mello-Leitão, 1929) – Brazil
- Aysha insulana Chickering, 1937 – Panama
- Aysha janaita Brescovit, 1992 – Brazil
- Aysha lagenifera (Mello-Leitão, 1944) – Argentina
- Aysha lisei Brescovit, 1992 – Brazil
- Aysha marinonii Brescovit, 1992 – Brazil, Paraguay, Argentina
- Aysha montenegro Brescovit, 1992 – Brazil, Argentina
- Aysha piassaguera Brescovit, 1992 – Brazil
- Aysha pirassununga Brescovit, 1992 – Brazil, Argentina
- Aysha proseni Mello-Leitão, 1944 – Brazil, Argentina
- Aysha prospera Keyserling, 1891 – Bolivia, Brazil, Uruguay, Argentina
- Aysha robusta (Keyserling, 1891) – Brazil
- Aysha rubromaculata (Keyserling, 1891) – Brazil, Argentina
- Aysha striolata (Keyserling, 1891) – Brazil
- Aysha subruba (Keyserling, 1891) – Brazil
- Aysha taeniata (Keyserling, 1891) – Brazil
- Aysha taim Brescovit, 1992 – Brazil
- Aysha tapejara Brescovit, 1992 – Brazil
- Aysha tertulia Brescovit, 1992 – Brazil, Argentina
- Aysha triunfo Brescovit, 1992 – Brazil, Argentina
- Aysha vacaria Brescovit, 1992 – Brazil
- Aysha yacupoi Brescovit, 1992 – Brazil, Argentina
- Aysha zenzesi (Mello-Leitão, 1945) – Brazil, Argentina
