= Araiya =

Scientific classification
- Kingdom: Animalia
- Phylum: Arthropoda
- Subphylum: Chelicerata
- Class: Arachnida
- Order: Araneae
- Infraorder: Araneomorphae
- Family: Anyphaenidae
- Genus: Araiya; Ramírez, 2003

Type species
- A. pallida (Tullgren, 1902)

Species
- A. coccinea (Simon, 1884) – Chile, Argentina; A. pallida (Tullgren, 1902) – Chile, Argentina

Genus of spiders

Araiya is a genus of South American anyphaenid sac spiders first described by M. J. Ramírez in 2003.As of October 2026 it contains only two species.
