= Patrera =

Scientific classification
- Kingdom: Animalia
- Phylum: Arthropoda
- Subphylum: Chelicerata
- Class: Arachnida
- Order: Araneae
- Infraorder: Araneomorphae
- Family: Anyphaenidae
- Genus: Patrera; Simon, 1903

Type species
- P. fulvastra Simon, 1903

Species
- 48, see text

Genus of spiders

Patrera is a genus of anyphaenid sac spiders first described by Eugène Simon in 1903.

== Species ==
As of October 2026 it contains forty-eight species:

- Patrera anchicaya Martínez, Brescovit, Villarreal & Oliveira, 2021 – Colombia
- Patrera apora (Chamberlin, 1916) – Peru
- Patrera armata (Chickering, 1940) – Panama, Colombia, Guyana, Brazil
- Patrera auricoma (L. Koch, 1866) – Colombia
- Patrera barbacoas Martínez, Brescovit, Villarreal & Oliveira, 2021 – Colombia
- Patrera bonaldoi Martínez, Brescovit, Villarreal & Oliveira, 2021 – Colombia
- Patrera borjai Martínez, Brescovit, Villarreal & Oliveira, 2021 – Colombia
- Patrera boteroi Martínez, Brescovit, Villarreal & Oliveira, 2021 – Colombia
- Patrera carvalhoi Martínez, Brescovit, Villarreal & Oliveira, 2021 – Colombia
- Patrera chucurui Martínez, Brescovit, Villarreal & Oliveira, 2021 – Colombia
- Patrera cita (Keyserling, 1891) – Brazil
- Patrera concolor (Keyserling, 1891) – Brazil
- Patrera danielae Martínez, Brescovit, Villarreal & Oliveira, 2021 – Colombia
- Patrera dawkinsi Martínez, Brescovit, Villarreal & Oliveira, 2021 – Colombia
- Patrera dentata Martínez, Brescovit, Villarreal & Oliveira, 2021 – Colombia
- Patrera dimar Martínez, Brescovit, Villarreal & Oliveira, 2021 – Colombia
- Patrera dracula Martínez, Brescovit, Villarreal & Oliveira, 2021 – Colombia
- Patrera florezi Martínez, Brescovit, Villarreal & Oliveira, 2021 – Colombia
- Patrera fulvastra Simon, 1903 – Colombia, Ecuador
- Patrera hatunkiru Dupérré & Tapia, 2016 – Ecuador
- Patrera kuryi Martínez, Brescovit, Villarreal & Oliveira, 2021 – Colombia
- Patrera lauta (Chickering, 1940) – Panama
- Patrera longipes (Keyserling, 1891) – Brazil, Argentina
- Patrera longitibialis Martínez, Brescovit, Villarreal & Oliveira, 2021 – Colombia
- Patrera opertanea (Keyserling, 1891) – Brazil
- Patrera pellucida (Keyserling, 1891) – Brazil
- Patrera perafani Martínez, Brescovit, Villarreal & Oliveira, 2021 – Colombia
- Patrera perijaensis Martínez, Brescovit, Villarreal & Oliveira, 2021 – Colombia
- Patrera philipi Dupérré & Tapia, 2016 – Ecuador
- Patrera platnicki Martínez, Brescovit, Villarreal & Oliveira, 2021 – Colombia
- Patrera procera (Keyserling, 1891) – Brazil, Paraguay, Argentina
- Patrera puta (O. Pickard-Cambridge, 1896) – Costa Rica
- Patrera quillacinga Martínez, Brescovit, Villarreal & Oliveira, 2021 – Colombia
- Patrera quimbaya Martínez, Brescovit, Villarreal & Oliveira, 2021 – Colombia
- Patrera ramirezi Martínez, Brescovit, Villarreal & Oliveira, 2021 – Colombia
- Patrera recentissima (Keyserling, 1891) – Brazil
- Patrera rubra (F. O. Pickard-Cambridge, 1900) – Guatemala, Costa Rica, Colombia, Ecuador
- Patrera sampedroi Martínez, Brescovit, Villarreal & Oliveira, 2021 – Colombia
- Patrera shida Dupérré & Tapia, 2016 – Ecuador
- Patrera stylifer (F. O. Pickard-Cambridge, 1900) – Panama
- Patrera suni Dupérré & Tapia, 2016 – Ecuador
- Patrera tensa (Keyserling, 1891) – Brazil
- Patrera teresopolis Oliveira & Brescovit, 2021 – Brazil
- Patrera virgata (Keyserling, 1891) – Brazil
- Patrera witsu Dupérré & Tapia, 2016 – Ecuador
- Patrera wiwa Martínez, Brescovit, Villarreal & Oliveira, 2021 – Colombia
- Patrera yukpa Martínez, Brescovit, Villarreal & Oliveira, 2021 – Colombia
