= Gayennoides =

Scientific classification
- Kingdom: Animalia
- Phylum: Arthropoda
- Subphylum: Chelicerata
- Class: Arachnida
- Order: Araneae
- Infraorder: Araneomorphae
- Family: Anyphaenidae
- Genus: Gayennoides; Ramírez, 2003

Type species
- G. molles Ramírez, 2003

Species
- G. losvilos Ramírez, 2003 – Chile; G. molles Ramírez, 2003 – Chile

Genus of spiders

Gayennoides is a genus of South American anyphaenid sac spiders first described by M. J. Ramírez in 2003. As of October 2026 it contains only two species, both found in Chile.
