= Sillus =

Scientific classification
- Kingdom: Animalia
- Phylum: Arthropoda
- Subphylum: Chelicerata
- Class: Arachnida
- Order: Araneae
- Infraorder: Araneomorphae
- Family: Anyphaenidae
- Genus: Sillus; F. O. Pickard-Cambridge, 1900

Type species
- S. attiguus (O. Pickard-Cambridge, 1896)

Species
- 8, see text

Genus of spiders

Sillus is a genus of anyphaenid sac spiders first described by Frederick Octavius Pickard-Cambridge in 1900.

== Species ==
As of October 2026 it contains eight species:

- Sillus attiguus (O. Pickard-Cambridge, 1896) — Mexico
- Sillus curvispina F. O. Pickard-Cambridge, 1900 — Panama
- Sillus dubius (Chickering, 1937) — Panama
- Sillus furciger Caporiacco, 1954 — French Guiana
- Sillus imbecillus (Keyserling, 1891) — Brazil
- Sillus longispina F. O. Pickard-Cambridge, 1900 — Guatemala, Costa Rica, Panama
- Sillus lunula F. O. Pickard-Cambridge, 1900 — Guatemala
- Sillus ravus Chickering, 1940 — Panama
