= Ilocomba =

Scientific classification
- Kingdom: Animalia
- Phylum: Arthropoda
- Subphylum: Chelicerata
- Class: Arachnida
- Order: Araneae
- Infraorder: Araneomorphae
- Family: Anyphaenidae
- Genus: Ilocomba; Brescovit, 1997

Type species
- I. marta Brescovit, 1997

Species
- I. marta Brescovit, 1997; I. perija Brescovit, 1997; I. yotoco Leonel Martínez, Melisa Eyes-Escalante, Jimmy Cabra-García, 2026

Genus of spiders

Ilocomba is a genus of anyphaenid sac spiders tht are native to Colombia. It is one of the least known genera of the Colombian members of this family.

== Taxonomy ==
The genus was first described by Antônio Brescovit, a Brazilian arachnologist, in 1997. He described two species: Ilocomba marta (type species) and Ilocomba perija. In 2026, morphological and molecular evidence supported the existence of a third species, Ilocomba yotoco.

=== Species ===
As of October 2026 this genus contains three described species. They are listed below:

1. Ilocomba marta Brescovit, 1997 (type species)
2. Ilocomba perija Brescovit, 1997
3. Ilocomba yotoco Leonel Martínez, Melisa Eyes-Escalante, Jimmy Cabra-García, 2026

== Distribution ==
All members of this genus are native only to South America, specifically the Andean region of Colombia.
