= Hatitia =

Scientific classification
- Kingdom: Animalia
- Phylum: Arthropoda
- Subphylum: Chelicerata
- Class: Arachnida
- Order: Araneae
- Infraorder: Araneomorphae
- Family: Anyphaenidae
- Genus: Hatitia; Brescovit, 1997

Type species
- H. yhuaia Brescovit, 1997

Species
- 11, see text

Genus of spiders

Hatitia is a genus of South American anyphaenid sac spiders first described by Antônio Brescovit in 1997.

== Species ==
As of October 2026 it contains eleven species:

- Hatitia cajuata Oliveira & Brescovit, 2025 – Bolivia
- Hatitia canchaque Brescovit, 1997 – Ecuador, Peru
- Hatitia defonlonguei (Berland, 1913) – Ecuador
- Hatitia machiguenga Oliveira & Brescovit, 2025 – Peru
- Hatitia oxpampa Oliveira & Brescovit, 2025 – Peru
- Hatitia perrieri (Berland, 1913) – Ecuador
- Hatitia riveti (Berland, 1913) – Ecuador
- Hatitia sericea (L. Koch, 1866) – Colombia
- Hatitia winayhuayna Oliveira & Brescovit, 2025 – Peru, Bolivia
- Hatitia yhuaia Brescovit, 1997 – Peru
- Hatitia zarate Oliveira & Brescovit, 2025 – Peru
