= Temnida =

Scientific classification
- Kingdom: Animalia
- Phylum: Arthropoda
- Subphylum: Chelicerata
- Class: Arachnida
- Order: Araneae
- Infraorder: Araneomorphae
- Family: Anyphaenidae
- Genus: Temnida; Simon

Species
- Temnida rosario Brescovit, 1997; Temnida simplex Simon, 1897

Genus of spiders

Temnida is a genus of spiders in the family Anyphaenidae. It was first described in 1896 by Simon. As of 2026 it contains 2 species.
