= Aysenoides =

Scientific classification
- Kingdom: Animalia
- Phylum: Arthropoda
- Subphylum: Chelicerata
- Class: Arachnida
- Order: Araneae
- Infraorder: Araneomorphae
- Family: Anyphaenidae
- Genus: Aysenoides; Ramírez

Species
- 5, see text

Genus of spiders

Aysenoides is a genus of spiders in the family Anyphaenidae. It was first described in 2003 by Martín Javier Ramírez. Its five species are found in Chile and Argentina.

== Species ==
As of October 2026, this genus includes five species:

- Aysenoides colecole Ramírez, 2003 – Chile
- Aysenoides nahuel Izquierdo & Ramírez, 2008 – Chile
- Aysenoides parvus Ramírez, 2003 – Chile, Argentina
- Aysenoides simoi Laborda, Ramírez & Pizarro-Araya, 2013 – Chile, Argentina
- Aysenoides terricola Ramírez, 2003 – Chile
