= Isigonia =

Scientific classification
- Kingdom: Animalia
- Phylum: Arthropoda
- Subphylum: Chelicerata
- Class: Arachnida
- Order: Araneae
- Infraorder: Araneomorphae
- Family: Anyphaenidae
- Genus: Isigonia; Simon, 1897

Type species
- I. limbata Simon, 1897

Species
- I. camacan Brescovit, 1991 – Brazil; I. limbata Simon, 1897 – Venezuela, Peru, Brazil; I. reducta (Chickering, 1940) – Panama

Genus of spiders

Isigonia is a genus of anyphaenid sac spiders first described by Eugène Simon in 1897.As of October 2026 it contains only three species.
