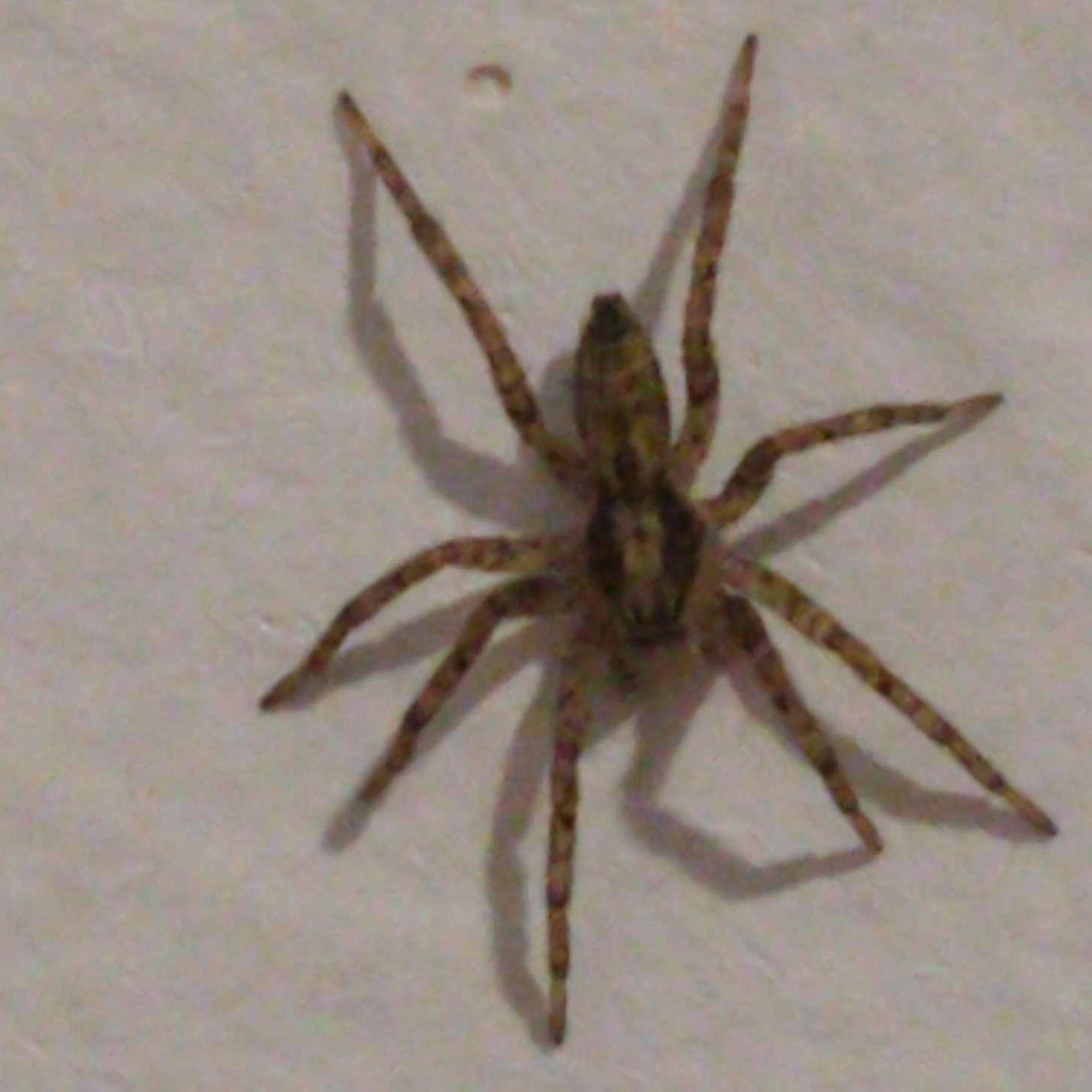
- Tomopisthes varius

Scientific classification
- Kingdom: Animalia
- Phylum: Arthropoda
- Subphylum: Chelicerata
- Class: Arachnida
- Order: Araneae
- Infraorder: Araneomorphae
- Family: Anyphaenidae
- Genus: Tomopisthes; Simon, 1884

Type species
- T. horrendus (Nicolet, 1849)

Species
- 5, see text

Synonyms
- Heterommides

= Tomopisthes =

Genus of spiders

Tomopisthes is a genus of South American anyphaenid sac spiders first described by Eugène Simon in 1884.

== Species ==
As of October 2026 it contains five species:

- Tomopisthes horrendus (Nicolet, 1849) – Chile, Argentina
- Tomopisthes puconensis (Ramírez, 2003) – Chile, Argentina
- Tomopisthes pusillus (Nicolet, 1849) – Chile, Argentina
- Tomopisthes tullgreni Simon, 1905 – Argentina
- Tomopisthes varius Simon, 1884 – Chile, Argentina
