= Shuyushka =

Scientific classification
- Kingdom: Animalia
- Phylum: Arthropoda
- Subphylum: Chelicerata
- Class: Arachnida
- Order: Araneae
- Infraorder: Araneomorphae
- Family: Anyphaenidae
- Genus: Shuyushka; Dupérré & Tapia, 2016

Type species
- Shuyushka wachi Dupérré & Tapia, 2016

Species
- S. achachay Dupérré & Tapia, 2016; S. moscai Dupérré & Tapia, 2016; S. wachi Dupérré & Tapia, 2016

Genus of spiders

Shuyushka is a genus of spiders in the family Anyphaenidae. It was first described in 2016 by Nadine Dupérré and Elicio Tapia. As of 2026, it contains 3 species from Ecuador.
