= Mesilla (spider) =

Scientific classification
- Kingdom: Animalia
- Phylum: Arthropoda
- Subphylum: Chelicerata
- Class: Arachnida
- Order: Araneae
- Infraorder: Araneomorphae
- Family: Anyphaenidae
- Genus: Mesilla; Simon, 1903

Type species
- M. vittiventris Simon, 1903

Species
- M. anyphaenoides Caporiacco, 1954 — French Guiana; M. vittiventris Simon, 1903 — Colombia, Ecuador

Genus of spiders

Mesilla is a genus of South American anyphaenid sac spiders first described by Eugène Simon in 1903. As of October 2026 it contains only two species.
