= Tasata =

Scientific classification
- Kingdom: Animalia
- Phylum: Arthropoda
- Subphylum: Chelicerata
- Class: Arachnida
- Order: Araneae
- Infraorder: Araneomorphae
- Family: Anyphaenidae
- Genus: Tasata; Simon, 1903

Type species
- T. parcepunctata Simon, 1903

Species
- 15, see text

Genus of spiders

Tasata is a genus of South American anyphaenid sac spiders first described by Eugène Simon in 1903.

== Species ==
As of October 2026 it contains fifteen species, most from Brazil:

- Tasata centralis Ramírez, 2003 – Argentina
- Tasata frenata (Mello-Leitão, 1947) – Brazil
- Tasata fuscotaeniata (Keyserling, 1891) – Brazil
- Tasata nova (Mello-Leitão, 1922) – Brazil
- Tasata parcepunctata Simon, 1903 – Argentina, Uruguay
- Tasata punctata (Keyserling, 1891) – Brazil
- Tasata quinquenotata (Simon, 1897) – Brazil
- Tasata reticulata (Mello-Leitão, 1943) – Brazil
- Tasata taim Ramírez, 2003 – Brazil
- Tasata taperae (Mello-Leitão, 1929) – Brazil
- Tasata tigris Mello-Leitão, 1941 – Brazil
- Tasata tripunctata (Mello-Leitão, 1941) – Brazil
- Tasata tullgreni Roewer, 1951 – Bolivia
- Tasata unipunctata (Simon, 1897) – Brazil
- Tasata variolosa Mello-Leitão, 1943 – Brazil, Uruguay, Argentina
