= Tafana =

Scientific classification
- Kingdom: Animalia
- Phylum: Arthropoda
- Subphylum: Chelicerata
- Class: Arachnida
- Order: Araneae
- Infraorder: Araneomorphae
- Family: Anyphaenidae
- Genus: Tafana; Simon, 1903

Type species
- T. riveti Simon, 1903

Species
- 16, see text

Genus of spiders

Tafana is a genus of South American anyphaenid sac spiders first described by Eugène Simon in 1903.

== Species ==
As of October 2026 it contains sixteen species:

- Tafana arawak de Oliveira & Brescovit, 2021 – Venezuela
- Tafana chimire de Oliveira & Brescovit, 2021 – Venezuela
- Tafana huatanay de Oliveira & Brescovit, 2021 – Colombia, Ecuador, Peru, Bolivia
- Tafana humahuaca de Oliveira & Brescovit, 2021 – Argentina
- Tafana kunturmarqa de Oliveira & Brescovit, 2021 – Colombia
- Tafana maracay de Oliveira & Brescovit, 2021 – Venezuela
- Tafana nevada de Oliveira & Brescovit, 2021 – Colombia, Venezuela
- Tafana oliviae de Oliveira & Brescovit, 2021 – Argentina
- Tafana orinoco de Oliveira & Brescovit, 2021 – Venezuela
- Tafana pastaza de Oliveira & Brescovit, 2021 – Ecuador
- Tafana pitieri de Oliveira & Brescovit, 2021 – Venezuela
- Tafana quelchi (Pocock, 1895) – Venezuela, Guayana, Brazil
- Tafana riveti Simon, 1903 – Colombia, Peru, Ecuador
- Tafana ruizi de Oliveira & Brescovit, 2021 – Colombia
- Tafana silhavyi (Caporiacco, 1955) – Venezuela
- Tafana straminea (L. Koch, 1866) – Colombia, Ecuador
