= Macrophyes =

Scientific classification
- Kingdom: Animalia
- Phylum: Arthropoda
- Subphylum: Chelicerata
- Class: Arachnida
- Order: Araneae
- Infraorder: Araneomorphae
- Family: Anyphaenidae
- Genus: Macrophyes; O. Pickard-Cambridge, 1893

Type species
- M. attenuata O. Pickard-Cambridge, 1893

Species
- 8, see text

Genus of spiders

Macrophyes is a genus of anyphaenid sac spiders first described by O. Pickard-Cambridge in 1893.

== Species ==
As of October 2026 it contains eight species:

- Macrophyes attenuata O. Pickard-Cambridge, 1893 – Mexico
- Macrophyes ceratii Martínez, Brescovit & Oliveira, 2020 – Colombia
- Macrophyes elongata Chickering, 1937 – Costa Rica, Panama
- Macrophyes jundiai Brescovit, 1993 – Brazil, Argentina
- Macrophyes manati Brescovit, 1993 – Peru
- Macrophyes pacoti Brescovit, Oliveira, J. C. M. S. M. Sobczak & J. B. Sobczak, 2019 – Brazil
- Macrophyes sanzi Martínez, Brescovit & Oliveira, 2020 – Colombia
- Macrophyes silvae Brescovit, 1992 – Peru
