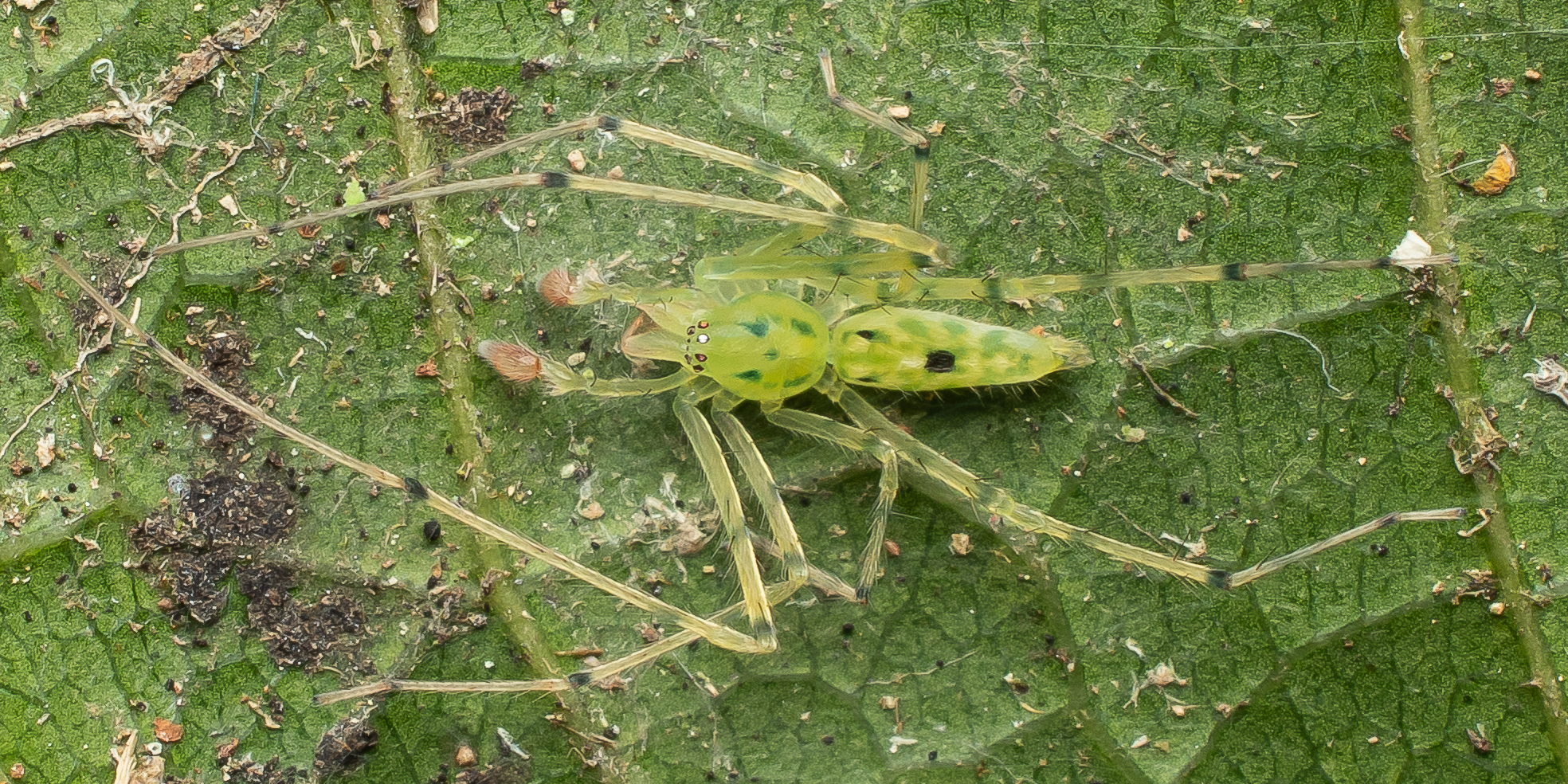

Scientific classification
- Kingdom: Animalia
- Phylum: Arthropoda
- Subphylum: Chelicerata
- Class: Arachnida
- Order: Araneae
- Infraorder: Araneomorphae
- Family: Anyphaenidae
- Genus: Wulfilopsis; Soares & Camargo, 1955

Type species
- W. tenuipes (Keyserling, 1891)

Species
- 6, see text

= Wulfilopsis =

Genus of spiders

Wulfilopsis is a genus of South American anyphaenid sac spiders first described by B. A. M. Soares & Hélio Ferraz de Almeida Camargo in 1955.

== Species ==
As of October 2026 it contains six species, all found in Brazil:

- Wulfilopsis frenata (Keyserling, 1891) – Brazil
- Wulfilopsis leopoldina Brescovit, 1997 – Brazil
- Wulfilopsis martinsi Brescovit, 1997 – Brazil
- Wulfilopsis pygmaea (Keyserling, 1891) – Brazil
- Wulfilopsis tenuipes (Keyserling, 1891) – Brazil
- Wulfilopsis tripunctata (Mello-Leitão, 1947) – Brazil
