= Antônio Brescovit =

Brazilian arachnologist (born 1959)

Antônio Domingos Brescovit
- Born: 1959 (age 66–67)
- Scientific career
- Fields: Arachnology
- Author abbrev. (zoology): Brescovit

Antônio Domingos Brescovit (born 1959) is a Brazilian arachnologist. His first name, Antônio (the spelling used in Brazil), may also be spelled António (the spelling used in Portugal). He develops academic activities at the 'arthropodae laboratorium' at the Butantan Institute, and he is a specialist in Neotropical Arachnida.

== Selected publications ==
- antonio d. Brescovit, alexandre b. Bonaldo, cristina a. Rheims. 2004. A new species of Drymusa Simon, 1891 (Araneae, Drymusidae) from Brazil. Editor Magnolia Press, 5 pp.
- alexandre b. Bonaldo, antonio d. Brescovit. 1997. Revisión del género Macerio y comentarios sobre la ubicación de Cheiracanthium, Tecution y Helebonia (Araeae, Miturgidae, Eutichurinae). Iheringia, ser. Zool. Porto Alegre (82): 43–66
- norman i. Platnick, antonio d. Brescovit. 1995. On Unicorn, a new genus of the spider family Oonopidae (Araneae, Dysderoidea). Nº 3152 de American Museum Novitates. Editor American Museum of Natural History, 12 pp.

=== Books ===
- alexandre b. Bonaldo, antonio d. Brescovit, cristina a. Rheims. 2005a. On a new species of Ericaella Bonaldo (Araneae, Miturgidae, Eutichurinae), with a cladistic analysis of the genus. Editor Magnolia Press, 25 pp.
- ricardo j. Saldierna-Martínez, enrique a. González-Navarro, gerardo Aceves-Medina, probir kumar Bandyopadhyay, juan a. Schnack, alejandro a. Valerio, roberta de Sá Longo, antonio d. Brescovit, adalberto j. Santos. 2005b. Larval development of Symphurus atramentatus (Cynoglossidae: Pleuronectiformes) from the Gulf of California. Editor Magnolia Press, 64 pp.
- antonio d. Brescovit. 1996. Revisão de Anyphaeninae bertkau a nível de gêneros na região neotropical: (araneae, anyphaenidae). Editor Sociedade Brasileira de Zoologia, 187 pp.
