= North Wales (disambiguation) =

North Wales is the northern geographic region of Wales.

North Wales may also refer to:

- North Wales (Senedd electoral region), an electoral region of the Senedd (the Welsh Parliament) covering the North Wales coast.
- North Wales (European Parliament constituency), a former European Parliament constituency in Wales, between 1979-1999.
- North Wales, Pennsylvania, a suburb of Philadelphia, Pennsylvania, US
  - North Wales (SEPTA station)

== See also ==
- Gwynedd in the High Middle Ages
- New North Wales, Canada
