= Dunne Foxe Island =

Island in Nunavut, Canada

- Location within Nunavut Location within Canada

Geography
- Location: Hudson Bay
- Coordinates: 62°18′N 092°13′W
- Archipelago: Arctic Archipelago

Administration
- Canada
- Nunavut: Nunavut
- Region: Kivalliq

Demographics
- Population: Uninhabited

Dunne Foxe Island is one of the Canadian arctic islands in Nunavut, Canada within western Hudson Bay. The hamlet of Whale Cove is 25 km (16 mi) to the west.

The island was named on July 30, 1631, by Arctic explorer, Captain Luke Foxe.
