= Rasmus Jensen (priest) =

Danish priest (died 1620)

Rasmus Jensen (died 20 February 1620) was a Danish Lutheran priest and the first Lutheran cleric in Canada.

Little is known about the life of Jensen, not even the parish where he served as pastor, although his diary during the expedition provides some information. It is known that he was the chaplain aboard an expedition to the New World commissioned by King Christian IV of Denmark and Norway in 1619. The expedition was made up of two small Danish ships Enhiørningen and Lamprenen, with 64 sailors who were Danes, Norwegians, Swedes, and Germans.

Captained by the navigator and explorer, Jens Munk, the ships were searching for the Northwest Passage. After sailing into Frobisher Bay and Ungava Bay, Munk eventually passed through Hudson Strait and reached Digges Island (at the northern tip of Quebec) on August 20. They then set out across the Bay towards the southwest. By early September, they had not yet found a passage. The party arrived in Hudson Bay on September 7, landed at the mouth of Churchill River, settling at what is now Churchill, Manitoba.

The two ships were put side by side and prepared for winter as best as they could. It was a disastrous winter. Cold, famine, and scurvy destroyed most of the men. Jensen had died on 20 February 1620. Only Munk and two sailors survived to return, leaving no settlement in the New World. The frigate Enhiørningen had been broken down by ice during the winter. However, the smaller Lamprenen could be salvaged. The return trip lasted two months. The surviving crew members aboard the Lamprenen reached Bergen, Norway on 20 September 1620.

In the future, the majority of Danish Lutheran missionary activity was concentrated in India and the Danish West Indies, especially Saint Thomas. Rasmus Jensen's commemoration date is February 20 within the Evangelical Lutheran Church in Canada and the Evangelical Lutheran Church in America.

== Other sources ==
- Bente, Friedrich (1919) American Lutheranism Volume 1: Early History of American Lutheranism (St. Louis, Mo: Concordia Publishing House)
- Gosch, C. C. A. (1897) Danish Arctic Expeditions 1605 to 1620, volume ii (London: Hakluyt Society, No. xcvii)
- Pfatteicher, Phillip (1980) Festivals and Commemorations: A Handbook to the Calendar in the Lutheran Book of Worship (Minneapolis: Augsburg Fortress Press)
