= New Britain (Canada) =

Historical region of Canada

Coordinates: 50.1107°N 75.3918°W

New Britain as a historical term of limited usage referred in its day to the poorly mapped lands of North America north of 17th-century New France. The name applied primarily to today's Nunavik and Labrador interiors, though in the 18th century this had grown to include all of the mainland shores of Hudson Bay and James Bay north of the Canadas. British visitors came to sub-divide the district loosely into the territories of New South Wales, New North Wales and Labrador. The name Labrador predates mention of the other names by more than a century.

== Early exploration ==
In 1612, Welsh captain Thomas Button wintered on the shores of Hudson Bay, at the mouth of the river he named the Nelson. He dubbed his encampment Port Nelson, and "the whole of the western shore New Wales." Seven years later, in 1619, Danish captain Jens Munk wintered nearby at the mouth of the Churchill River, naming those environs Nova Dania (Latin for "New Denmark").

The region was again visited twelve years later in 1631 by Captains Thomas James and Luke Foxe. Supposedly, Captain Foxe, upon discovering a cross erected by Button at Port Nelson, christened the shore north of the Nelson River as New North Wales, and all the lands south as New South Wales. Another account attributes the event to Captain James, while crediting Foxe with having bestowed upon the region the since-forgotten label of New Yorkshire.

- New North Wales – Mainland Kivalliq in Nunavut, and the Northern Region in Manitoba south to Port Nelson.
- New South Wales – Northern Manitoba south from Port Nelson to James Bay, including the Kenora District in Ontario.
- Labrador – The eastern coast of Hudson Bay, including Nord-du-Québec in Québec and modern Labrador in Newfoundland and Labrador. During the "New Britain" era, the only European settlements in Labrador were the Moravian Church missions at Nain (1771), Okak (1776), and Hopedale (1782).

139 years later, Captain James Cook more successfully used the name New South Wales for the Australian Colony of New South Wales which eventually encompassed most of New Holland. By this time, the North American name had begun to fall into obscurity.
