= Hibana (disambiguation) =

Hibana is a genus of spiders.

Hibana may also refer to:

- Hibana: Spark, a 2016 Japanese television series
- Hibana World Tour, a 2025 concert tour by Japanese singer Ado
