= Jens Munk =

Danish navigator and explorer (1579–1628)

Jens Eriksen Munk
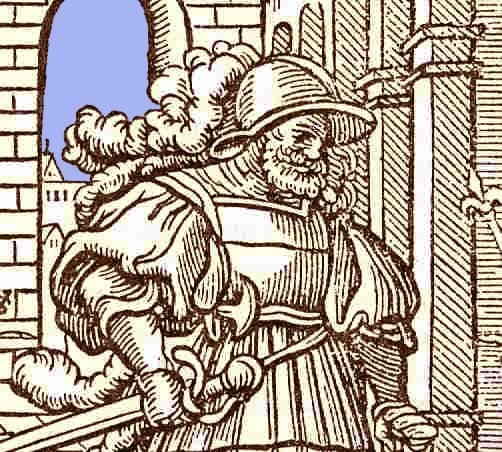
- Jens Eriksen Munk – unknown date and artist
- Born: 3 June 1579; Barbu, Arendal, Denmark–Norway
- Died: 24 June 1628 (aged 49); Pilestræde, Copenhagen, Denmark–Norway

Jens Eriksen Munk (3 June 1579 – 24 June 1628) was a Danish-Norwegian navigator and explorer. He entered into the service of King Christian IV of Denmark–Norway and is most noted for his attempts to find the Northwest Passage.

== Early life ==
Jens Munk was born on his father's estate Barbu (now part of Arendal Municipality) in the county of Nedenes, Norway. His father, Erik Nielsen Munk, had received several fiefs for his achievements in the Northern Seven Years' War. However, his father had a reputation for his brutal rule over his estates which led to several trials. In 1585, he was deposed and imprisoned at Dragsholm Castle in Denmark. At the age of eight, Munk moved to Aalborg with his mother, who became a housekeeper in the home of her husband's sister who was married to the city's mayor.

== Career ==
In 1591, at the age of twelve, Munk went to Porto in Portugal where he worked for the shipping magnate Duart Duez. The following year he sailed with a Dutch convoy to Bahia. Off the Brazilian coast, the convoy was attacked by French pirates. Munk was among the seven survivors. Munk lived in Bahia for six years, where he was in the service of Duart Duez' brother, Miguel. In 1599, under dramatic circumstances, Munk returned to Europe and Copenhagen, where the Danish magnate and Lord Chancellor Henrik Ramel hired him as a ship clerk.

In 1609, he set sail with his partner Jens Hvid for the ice-filled Barents Sea. After two unsuccessful attempts to find the Northeast Passage in 1609 and 1610, he caught the attention of King Christian IV of Denmark–Norway. In 1612, during the Kalmar War (1611–1613), Munk together with the nobleman Jørgen Daa led a successful attack on the Swedish Älvsborg Fortress, near today's Gothenburg. In 1614, he led a search for the privateer Jan Mendoses, whom he fought in a battle at Kanin Nos near the entrance of the White Sea. In the spring of 1617, he recruited eighteen Basque whalemen for the first Danish whaling expedition to Spitsbergen.

In 1618, Christian IV appointed him as commander of the first Danish expedition to East India with five vessels and almost 1,000 men, but only one month before the departure of the expedition, Munk was relegated and replaced by the much younger nobleman Ove Gjedde. The reason for the relegation is unclear, but was most likely caused by a conflict Munk had with the Lord Chancellor, Christian Friis. Munk's setback was compounded by the deaths of his brother Niels and good friend Jørgen Då. A few months earlier, Munk had also lost a vast amount of money as a result of an unsuccessful whaling expedition, which caused loss of social prestige. As an attempt to regain his social position, he started the planning of a much more spectacular expedition in 1619, the search for the Northwest Passage.

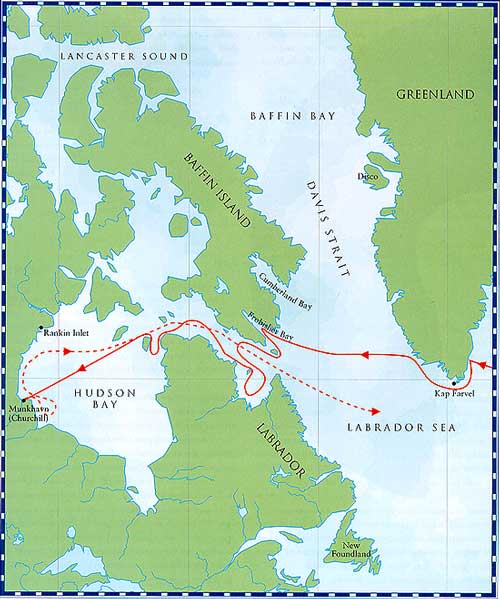
Munk's voyage of 1619–1620

On 9 May 1619, under the auspices of Christian IV, Munk set out with 65 men and two of His Royal Majesty's ships, the frigate Enhiørningen (the unicorn) and the sloop Lamprenen (the lamprey). Both were outfitted under his own supervision. His mission was to discover the Northwest Passage to the East Indies and China. His crew included Rasmus Jensen, a priest who is now recognized to be the first Lutheran cleric in Canada. Munk penetrated Davis Strait as far north as 69°, found Frobisher Bay, and then spent almost a month fighting his way through Hudson Strait.

In September 1619, he found the entrance to Hudson Bay and became the second European after Thomas Button to explore the western parts of the bay. The expedition spent the winter near the mouth of what is now known as the Churchill River, a place Munk named Nova Dania. Hypothermia, famine, and scurvy destroyed so many of his men that only two persons besides himself survived. With these men, he sailed for home with Lamprenen on 16 July 1620, reaching Bergen, Norway, on 20 September 1620. Later, a party of Indians returned to the shore of Hudson Bay where the expedition had camped. They found a number of unburied bodies of strange appearance and Munk's abandoned stores. Not knowing what gunpowder was, they set it alight and many of them were killed.

Munk had planned on a new Northwest journey to take possession of Nova Dania for the Danish crown, but his health was too weak to go on with it. In the subsequent years, Munk served as sea captain in the royal fleet. During the Thirty Years' War, Munk led a blockade on the River Weser in 1626 and 1627. Munk took part in the attacks on Wallenstein's troops at Fehmarn and in the Kieler Förde in March and April 1628.

== Death ==
Munk died on 24 June 1628, probably as a result of being wounded in the battles in the Kieler Förde a couple of months earlier. According to the French scientist Isaac La Peyrère, who served as a legate at the French embassy in Copenhagen, Munk died as a result of a dispute with Christian IV, in which the king attacked Munk with his stick and thus caused his death. Munk was buried at St. Nikolai Lutheran Church, Copenhagen, now Nikolaj cultural centre.

== Legacy ==
An account of Munk's voyage to Hudson Bay in 1619–1620 was published by him in Copenhagen in 1624 as Navigatio Septentrionalis. In 1647, Isaac La Peyrère included in his Relation du Groenland an abstract in French of Munk's account and a new map, both marred by many inaccuracies that would be perpetuated by following writers and mapmakers. New editions by Awnsham and John Churchill (1704 [1650]), An account of a most dangerous voyage perform'd by the famous Captain John Monck, in the years 1619, and 1620; Peter Lauridsen (Copenhagen, 1883), Efterretning af Navigationen og Reisen til det Nye Danmark af Styrmand Jens Munk; and by C. C. A. Gosch, Danish Arctic Expeditions 1605 to 1620, volume ii. Hakluyt Society, No. xcvii (London, 1897).

In 1964, a small scale archaeological excavation at Munk's site on the Churchill River by two Danes, Thorkild Hansen and Peter Seeberg, found a few remains of Enhjiørningen in the tidal flats. They are now in the National Museum of Denmark. Hansen also wrote the popular book The Way to Hudson Bay: The Life and Times of Jens Munk (1969), adapted into a movie in 2015.

Jens Munk Island, located off the coast of Baffin Island, is named after him as is Munk Harbour at the mouth of Churchill River in Hudson Bay. The Jens Munk rose (Hybrid Rugosa Rose Jens Munk) was developed by Agriculture and Agri-Food Canada and was named in his honour.
