= Rasmus Jensen =

Rasmus Jensen may refer to:

- Rasmus Jensen (handballer), Danish handballer
- Rasmus Jensen (priest), first Lutheran priest in Canada
- Rasmus Jensen (speedway rider), Danish motorcycle rider
