= Booth Island (Nunavut) =

Island in Nunavut, Canada

- Location within Nunavut Location within Canada

Geography
- Location: Hudson Bay
- Coordinates: 59°55′N 79°56′W
- Archipelago: Ottawa Islands; Arctic Archipelago
- Area: 5 km^{2} (1.9 sq mi)
- Coastline: 9 km (5.6 mi)

Administration
- Canada
- Nunavut: Nunavut
- Region: Qikiqtaaluk

Demographics
- Population: Uninhabited
- Source: Booth Island at Atlas of Canada

Booth Island is an uninhabited island in the Qikiqtaaluk Region, Nunavut, Canada. It is one of 24 islands that make up the Ottawa Islands, situated in the eastern portion of Hudson Bay.

Other islands in the vicinity include Bronson Island, Gilmour Island, Perley Island, J. Gordon Island, Pattee Island, and Eddy Island.
