= Perley Island =

Uninhabited island in the Canadian Arctic

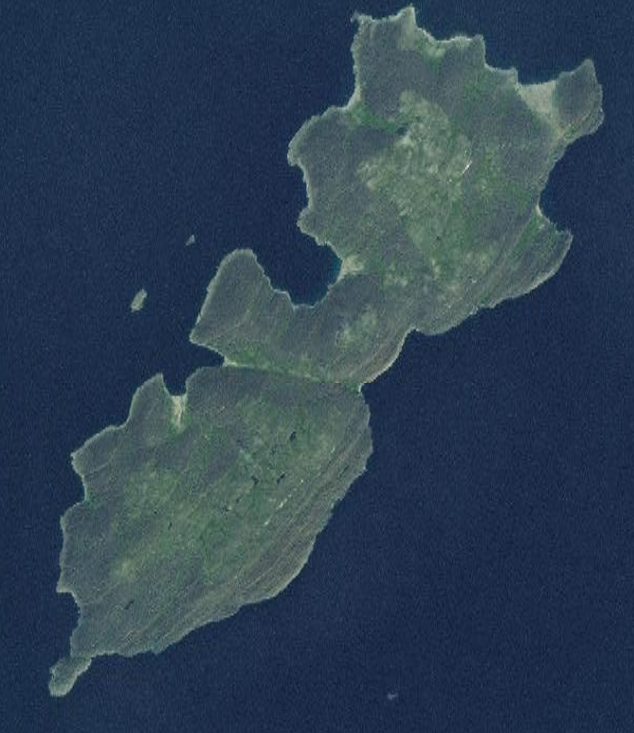
- Satellite picture of Perley Island.

- Location in Nunavut

Geography
- Location: Hudson Bay
- Coordinates: 59°40′N 80°16′W
- Archipelago: Ottawa Islands; Arctic Archipelago
- Area: 45 km^{2} (17 sq mi)
- Coastline: 37 km (23 mi)

Administration
- Canada
- Province: Nunavut
- Region: Qikiqtaaluk

Demographics
- Population: Uninhabited
- Source: Perley Island at Atlas of Canada

Perley Island is an uninhabited island in Qikiqtaaluk Region, Nunavut, Canada. It is one of 24 islands that make up the Ottawa Islands, situated in the eastern portion of Hudson Bay.

Other islands in the vicinity include Booth Island, Bronson Island, Eddy Island, J. Gordon Island, Pattee Island, and Gilmour Island.
