= Pattee Island =

Island in Canada

- Location within Nunavut Location within Canada

Geography
- Location: Hudson Bay
- Coordinates: 59°40′N 80°26′W
- Archipelago: Ottawa Islands; Arctic Archipelago
- Area: 12 km^{2} (4.6 sq mi)
- Coastline: 23 km (14.3 mi)

Administration
- Canada
- Nunavut: Nunavut
- Region: Qikiqtaaluk

Demographics
- Population: Uninhabited
- Source: Pattee Island at Atlas of Canada

Pattee Island is an uninhabited island in Qikiqtaaluk Region, Nunavut, Canada. It is one of 24 islands that make up the Ottawa Islands, situated in the eastern portion of Hudson Bay.

Other islands in the vicinity include Booth Island, Bronson Island Gilmour Island, J. Gordon Island, Eddy Island, and Perley Island.
