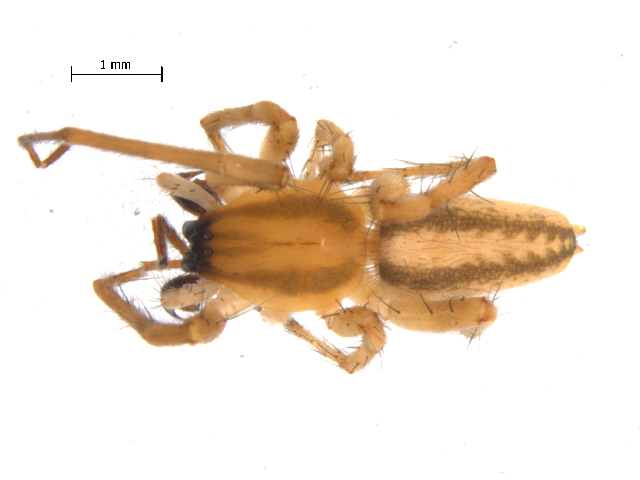

Scientific classification
- Domain: Eukaryota
- Kingdom: Animalia
- Phylum: Arthropoda
- Subphylum: Chelicerata
- Class: Arachnida
- Order: Araneae
- Infraorder: Araneomorphae
- Family: Anyphaenidae
- Genus: Hibana
- Species: H. futilis

Binomial name
- Hibana futilis (Banks, 1898)

= Hibana futilis =

Species of spider

Hibana futilis is a species of ghost spider in the family Anyphaenidae. It is found in a range from the United States to Venezuela and Cuba.
