= J. Gordon Island =

Island in Nunavut, Canada

- Location within Nunavut Location within Canada

Geography
- Location: Hudson Bay
- Coordinates: 59.67°N 80.55°W
- Archipelago: Ottawa Islands; Arctic Archipelago

Administration
- Canada
- Nunavut: Nunavut
- Region: Qikiqtaaluk

J. Gordon Island is an uninhabited island in Qikiqtaaluk Region, Nunavut, Canada. It is one of 24 islands that make up the Ottawa Islands, situated in the eastern portion of Hudson Bay.

Other islands in the vicinity include Booth Island, Bronson Island, Eddy Island, Gilmour Island, Pattee Island, and Perley Island.
