= Ottawa Islands =

Canadian island group in Hudson Bay

Arviliit (Inuit) Arqvilliit (Inuktitut)
- Location within Nunavut Location within Canada

Geography
- Location: Hudson Bay, Nunavik Marine Region
- Coordinates: 59°30′N 80°25′W
- Archipelago: Arctic Archipelago
- Total islands: 24
- Major islands: Booth Island, Bronson Island, Eddy Island, Gilmour Island, J. Gordon Island, Pattee Island, Perley Island
- Highest elevation: 549 m (1801 ft)

Administration
- Canada
- Nunavik

Demographics
- Population: Currently Uninhabited, access and harvest rights by Nunavik Inuit
- Source: Ottawa Islands at Atlas of Canada

The Ottawa Islands (Inuit: Arviliit or Arqvilliit in Inuktitut meaning "place where you see bowhead whales") are a group of currently uninhabited islands situated in the eastern edge of Canada's Hudson Bay. The group comprises 24 small islands, located at approximately 60°N 80°W. The main islands include Booth Island, Bronson Island, Eddy Island, Gilmour Island, J. Gordon Island, Pattee Island, and Perley Island. The highest point is on Gilmour Island, which rises to over 1,800 ft (550 m). Located a short distance off the northwest coast of Quebec's Ungava Peninsula, they, like the other coastal islands in Hudson Bay, were historically part of the Northwest Territories, and became Crown Land upon the creation of Nunavut in 1999. Nunavik Inuit have occupied these islands since time immemorial and gained constitutionally-protected harvest and access rights under the Nunavik Inuit Land Claim Agreement signed in 2007.

== Geography ==
The Ottawa Islands are situated on the barren and rocky east coast of Hudson Bay. By 1610, Hudson Bay had been explored and named by Henry Hudson in his quest for a Northwest Passage. It was not until 1631 when Luke Foxe (or Fox) on a voyage from "Vltimum Vale" (Cape Henrietta Maria), near 57° 40' N, indicated that "Mr. Hudson calls those islands by the name of 'Lancaster's Iles.'" According to historian T.H. Manning, there is no other record of Henry Hudson naming islands in that region. A little further north, near 58° 5' N, Capt. Foxe says "Wee came by a small Iland at clocke one, the highest I haue seene since I came from Brook Cobham; the deep 70 fathome. I named the Ile Sleepe." Foxe named the islands just north of Lancaster Isle, "Ile Sleepe". According to Manning, the name, having eventually changed to "Sleeper Island" or "The Sleepers", could be used "for the islands between and including Lancaster and Ottawa Islands."

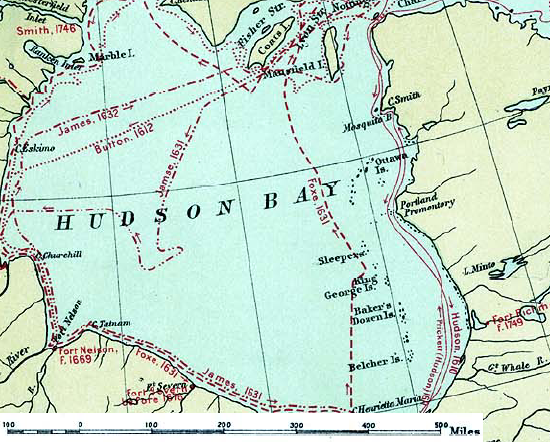
Canada, Routes of Explorers, 1497 to 1905

=== Further coordinate readings ===
- 59°48′N 080°03′W

== Geology ==
According to a survey conducted by Natural Resources Canada in 2007, the Ottawa Islands contain komatiite basalt rocks with various concentrations of magnesium from the Paleoproterozoic era. Lower concentration of magnesium are found on J. Gordon Island and Pattee Island.

== Fauna ==
The Ottawa Islands and the southwardly Belcher Islands are a breeding ground for "the Hudson Bay subspecies of the Common Eider". In 1765 commercial whaling of bowheads was started by Churchill-based sloops of the Hudson's Bay Company with some whales being harvested in the Ottawa Islands. The islands are important habitat for polar bears and many waterfowl. The waters surrounding the islands are important habitat for seals, walrus and bowhead and beluga whales.

== See also ==
- Arctic Archipelago
- Glacial landform

== Bibliography ==
- Manning, T. H. Birds and Mammals of the Belcher, Sleeper, Ottawa and King George Islands, and Northwest Territories. Ottawa: Canadian Wildlife Service, 1976.
- Manning, T.H., "Ruins of Eskimo Stone Houses on the East Side of Hudson Bay". American Antiquity, Vol. 11, No. 3 (Jan., 1946), pp. 201–202. doi:10.2307/275565, Republished by JSTOR, Web Link, Accessed 01-26-2007.
