= Erik Munk =

Danish military officer

Erik Nielsen Munk
- Born: c. 1532 or 1550; Halland, Denmark-Norway
- Died: January 1, 1594; Dragsholm Castle, Zealand, Denmark-Norway

Erik Nielsen Munk (c. 1532 or 1550- January 1, 1594) was a Danish military officer who was ennobled and received several fiefs in Norway for his military achievements. He was the father of the navigator and explorer Jens Munk and Niels Eriksen Munk (1577-1617).

== Biography ==
Erik Munk's year and place of birth remain unknown but his father was Niels Munk, apparently a member of an old noble family from Halland whose title had been lost through marriages. Little is known about his early life but he participated in the First French War of Religion in 1562 and was later posted at Vardøhus Fortress in Norway. In the Northern Seven Years' War, he led the expeditions to rescue Trondheim and Akershus. After the war, in reward, he was given several fiefs in Norway, and on 11 August 1580 he received a latter of ennoblement. However, it may only have confirmed an existing status.

Munk's brutal rule over his estates led to several trials against him and in 1586 he was deposed and imprisoned at Dragsholm Castle, near Kalundborg, west of Copenhagen. After in vain writing several letters of defense to the king, he died by suicide in 1594 by hanging.
