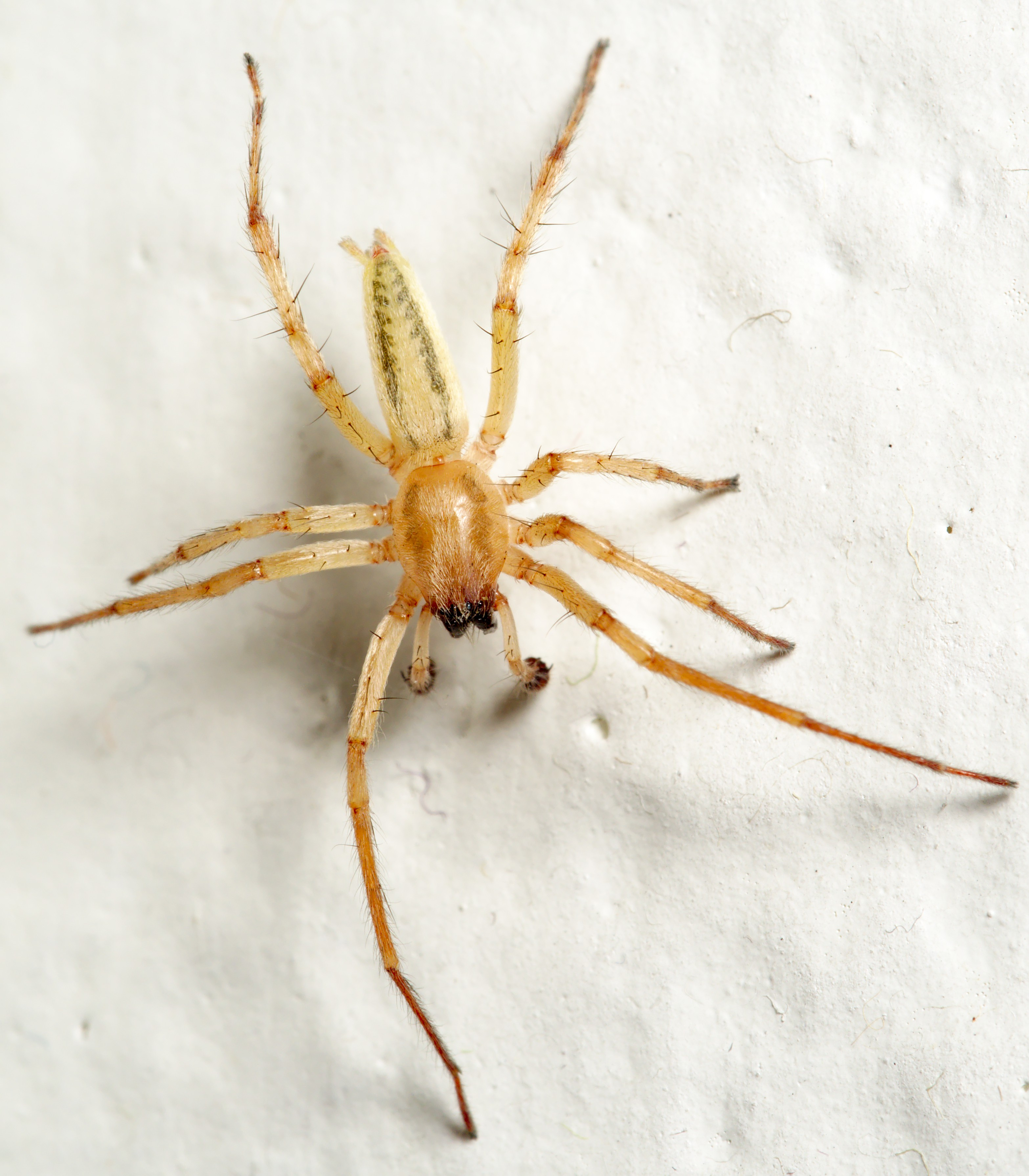
- H. incursa
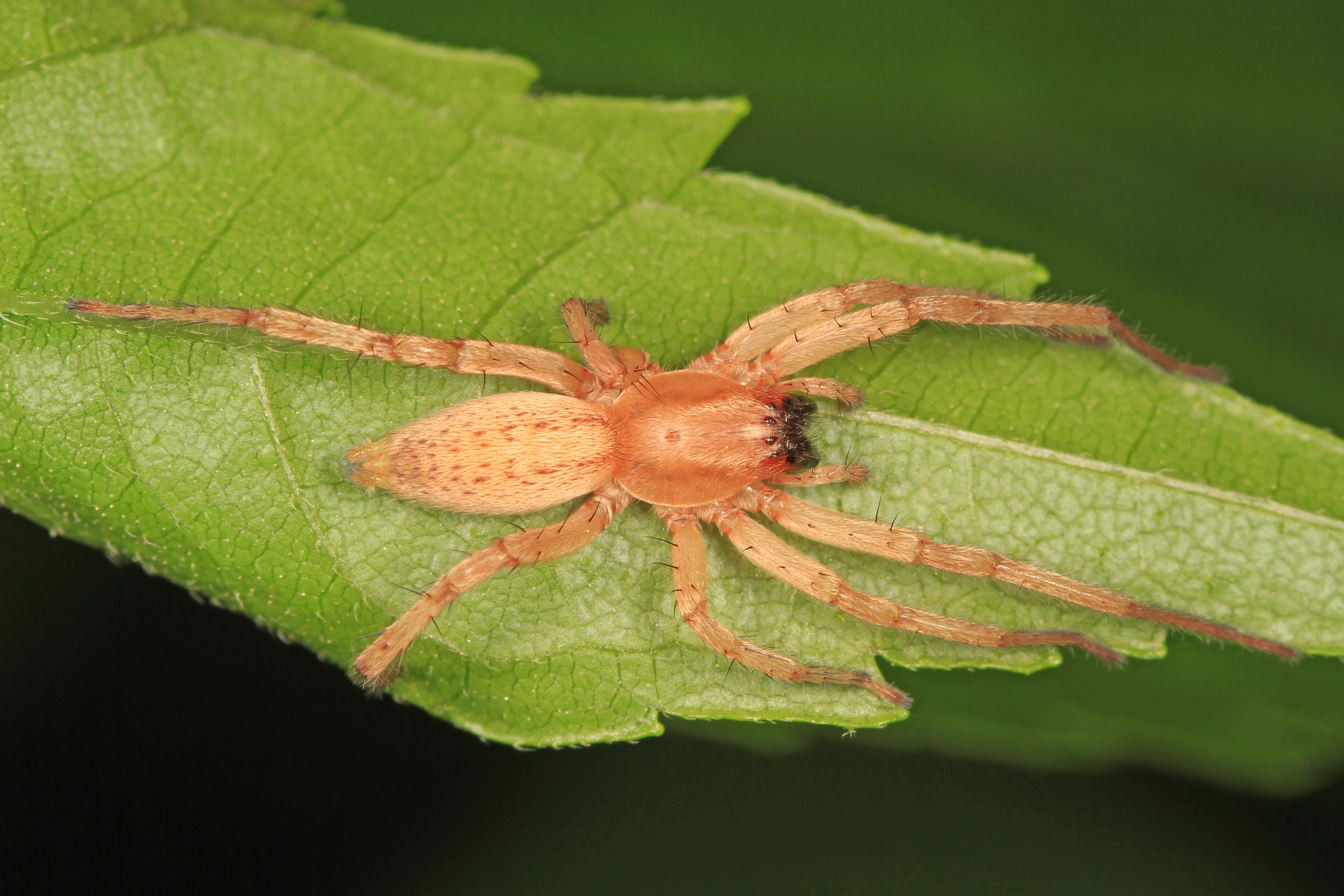
- H. gracilis

Scientific classification
- Kingdom: Animalia
- Phylum: Arthropoda
- Subphylum: Chelicerata
- Class: Arachnida
- Order: Araneae
- Infraorder: Araneomorphae
- Family: Anyphaenidae
- Genus: Hibana; Brescovit, 1991

Type species
- H. gracilis (Hentz, 1847)

Species
- 20, see text

= Hibana =

Genus of spiders

Hibana is a genus of anyphaenid sac spiders first described by Antônio Brescovit in 1991. It is found from the United States to Brazil, including the West Indies. It includes North America's yellow ghost spider, formerly categorized as Aysha velox.

== Species ==
As of October 2026 it contains twenty species:

- Hibana arunda (Platnick, 1974) – USA, Mexico
- Hibana ascensionensis Sherwood, Marusik, Sharp & Wilkins, 2024 – Ascension Islands
- Hibana banksi (Strand, 1906) – USA
- Hibana bicolor (Banks, 1909) – Costa Rica, Colombia
- Hibana cambridgei (Bryant, 1931) – USA, Mexico
- Hibana discolor (Mello-Leitão, 1929) – Brazil, Bolivia
- Hibana flavescens (Schmidt, 1971) – Colombia
- Hibana fusca (Franganillo, 1926) – Cuba
- Hibana futilis (Banks, 1898) – USA to Venezuela, Cuba
- Hibana gracilis (Hentz, 1847) – USA, Canada
- Hibana incursa (Chamberlin, 1919) – USA to Panama
- Hibana labonita Galvis & Brescovit, 2020 – Dominica
- Hibana longipalpa (Bryant, 1931) – El Salvador, Nicaragua, Costa Rica
- Hibana melloleitaoi (Caporiacco, 1947) – Mexico to Brazil
- Hibana similaris (Banks, 1929) – Mexico to Brazil
- Hibana taboga Brescovit, 1991 – Panama
- Hibana talmina Brescovit, 1993 – Dominican Republic, Trinidad, northern South America
- Hibana tenuis (L. Koch, 1866) – Mexico to Venezuela, Caribbean
- Hibana turquinensis (Bryant, 1940) – Cuba
- Hibana velox (Becker, 1879) – USA, Mexico, Caribbean
