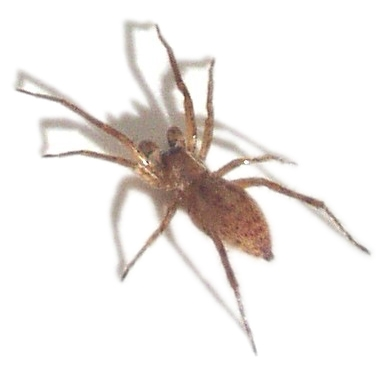
- Male Hibana velox

Scientific classification
- Kingdom: Animalia
- Phylum: Arthropoda
- Subphylum: Chelicerata
- Class: Arachnida
- Order: Araneae
- Infraorder: Araneomorphae
- Family: Anyphaenidae
- Genus: Hibana
- Species: H. velox

Binomial name
- Hibana velox (Becker, 1879)

Synonyms
- Anyphaena velox Anyphaena floridana Aysha orlandensis Anyphaena verrilli Chiracanthium falculum Anyphaena pallidula Aysha velox

= Hibana velox =

Yellow ghost spider

Species of spider

Hibana velox (formerly known as Aysha velox), commonly called the yellow ghost spider, is a spider species in the family Anyphaenidae, native to North America. It is found in foliage and in houses, and is an effective predator of insects such as the citrus leafminer, Phyllocnistis citrella (Gracillariidae).

== Taxonomy ==
The Hibana genus was described by Antônio Brescovit in 1991. Hibana velox belongs to the family Anyphaenidae, commonly referred to as sac spiders or ghost spiders, from which its common name derives. Anyphaenidae is distinguished from the related family Clubionidae by the placement of the abdominal spiracle.

== Description ==
Hibana velox is a relatively small spider, with a body length ranging from 1/4 to 1/2 inch. The abdomen is elongated and bears pairs of spinnerets located near the epigastric furrow on its underside. Coloration varies and may include shades of brown, yellow, beige, and tan; some individuals display dark markings on the dorsal surface. The species can be identified by its short retrolateral tibial apophysis and the absence of a ventral tibial apophysis. The chelicerae bear four promarginal teeth and eight retromarginal denticles. The eyes number eight in total, arranged in two groups of four.

== Distribution and habitat ==
Hibana velox is found from the United States south to South America, and is a common species throughout its range. Within North America, the family Anyphaenidae is predominantly found along the east coast and throughout the southern United States, ranging from Texas and Florida north to the Carolinas and into Canada. The species is particularly abundant in Florida, where it is present year-round. In Florida, the species has also been recorded colonizing mangrove islands.

The species favors hot, humid, and tropical environments. It is typically found in foliage, and silken retreats are constructed under rocks, behind tree bark, and within leaf litter. Hibana velox is nocturnal and generally remains hidden in its retreat during the day.

== Behavior and diet ==
Most spiders are terrestrial carnivores or opportunistic feeders, and Hibana velox is no exception. Its diet varies by season and location, and consists primarily of tree crops, insect egg sacs, and small invertebrates. Tree crops provide natural sugars and nectar that serve as an energy source. When engaging in oophagy, the species shows a preference for lepidopteran eggs and the eggs of other spiders, though as an opportunistic feeder it may also consume coleopteran eggs.

== Relationship with humans ==
=== Venom and bites ===
Although Hibana velox is capable of biting humans, its venom is not generally considered dangerous. Some bites may result in localized swelling and soreness, and, if left untreated, the affected area can become necrotic.

=== Agricultural use ===
Within the agricultural industry, the yellow ghost spider is used as a method of biological pest control in citrus orchards. It frequently preys on the citrus leafminer (Phyllocnistis citrella), a pest that can cause significant damage to orchard crops.
