= Gilmour Island =

Island in Nunavut, Canada

- Location within Nunavut Location within Canada

Geography
- Location: Hudson Bay
- Coordinates: 59°47′59″N 80°1′59″W
- Archipelago: Ottawa Islands; Arctic Archipelago
- Area: 84 km^{2} (32 sq mi)
- Coastline: 53 km (32.9 mi)
- Highest elevation: 549 m (1801 ft)

Administration
- Canada
- Nunavut: Nunavut
- Region: Qikiqtaaluk

Demographics
- Population: Uninhabited
- Source: Gilmour Island at Atlas of Canada

Gilmour Island is an uninhabited island in the Qikiqtaaluk Region, Nunavut, Canada. It is one of 24 islands that make up the Ottawa Islands, situated in the eastern portion of Hudson Bay. The highest point is over 549 m (1,801 ft).

Other islands in the vicinity include Booth Island, Bronson Island, Eddy Island, J. Gordon Island, Pattee Island, and Perley Island.
