= Ascension Islands =

Canadian arctic islands group

- Location within Nunavut Location within Canada

Geography
- Location: Foxe Channel
- Coordinates: 64°22′19″N 081°41′15″W

Administration
- Canada
- Territory: Nunavut
- Region: Kivalliq

Demographics
- Population: Uninhabited

One of the Southampton Island offshore island groups, the Ascension Islands are uninhabited islands located in Foxe Basin's Foxe Channel, northwest of Caribou Island. They are part of the Kivalliq Region, in the Canadian territory of Nunavut.
