= Jan Mendoses =

European pirate

Jan Mendoses was a European pirate or merchant who lived during the 17th century. It is possible that Jan Mendoses' real name was Juan [de] Mendoza. There is considerable doubt about his nationality, some sources claiming he was from the Spanish Netherlands and named Mandaus, others that he was Spanish. He may even have been a merchant heading for the Tsardom of Russia, rather than the "notorious pirate" claimed by Danish sources.

According to the Danes, he had earlier been raiding the Faroe Islands with the English pirate Thomas Tucker who had formerly served under the English pirate Admiral Easton. In 1614, Tucker fitted out his first pirate command in Morocco and seems to have recruited Mendoses there. Mendoses was captured by the Danish Admiral Jørgen Daa off the north coast of Norway outside Vardø, in 1615. The future explorer Jens Munk served on Daa's ship, and a book which Munk took from Mendoses' ship is now in the Danish Royal Library. Mendoses was taken back to Copenhagen where he was hanged.
