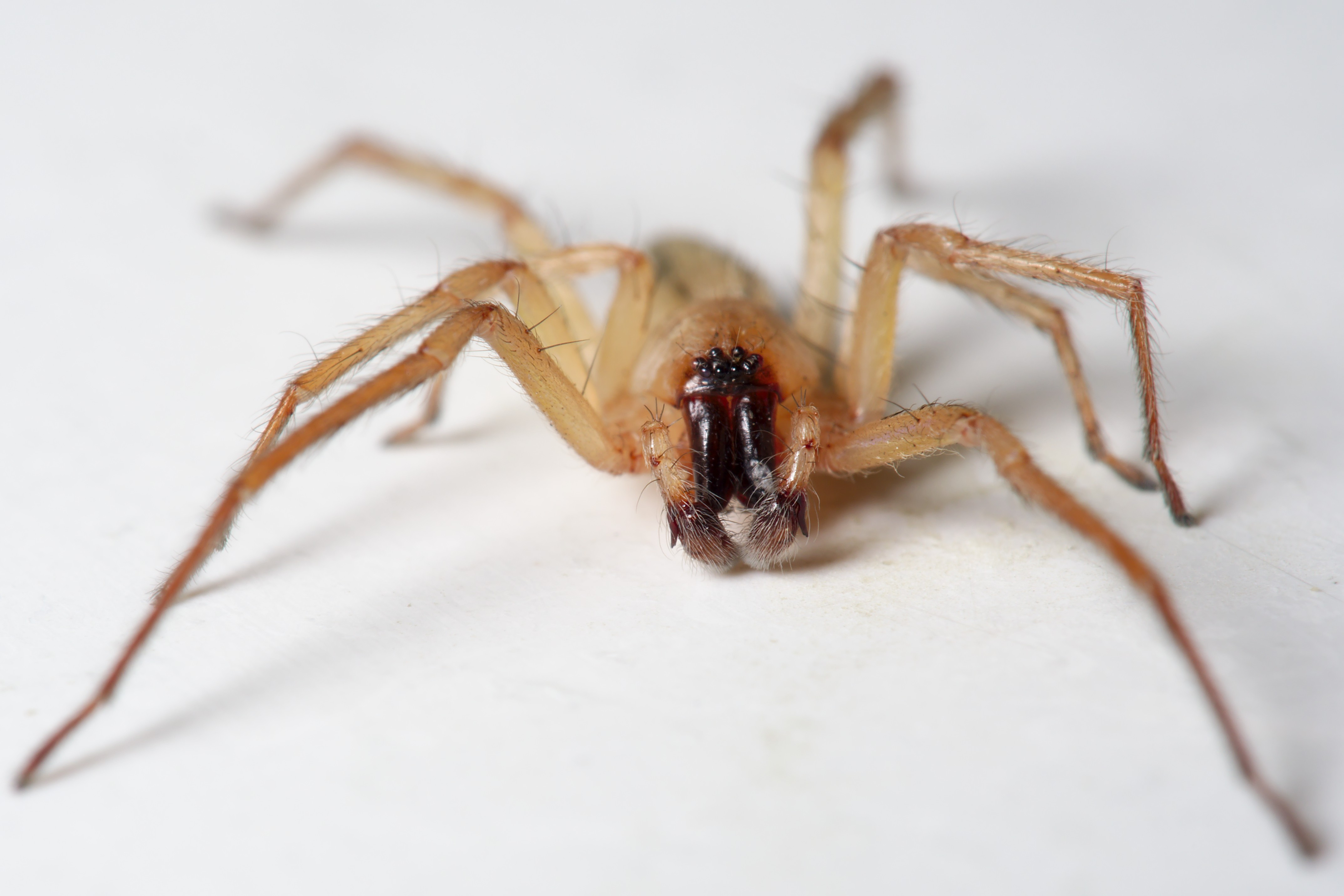

Scientific classification
- Kingdom: Animalia
- Phylum: Arthropoda
- Subphylum: Chelicerata
- Class: Arachnida
- Order: Araneae
- Infraorder: Araneomorphae
- Family: Anyphaenidae
- Genus: Hibana
- Species: H. incursa

Binomial name
- Hibana incursa (Chamberlin, 1919)

= Hibana incursa =

Species of spider

Hibana incursa is a species of ghost spider in the family Anyphaenidae. It is found in USA to Panama.

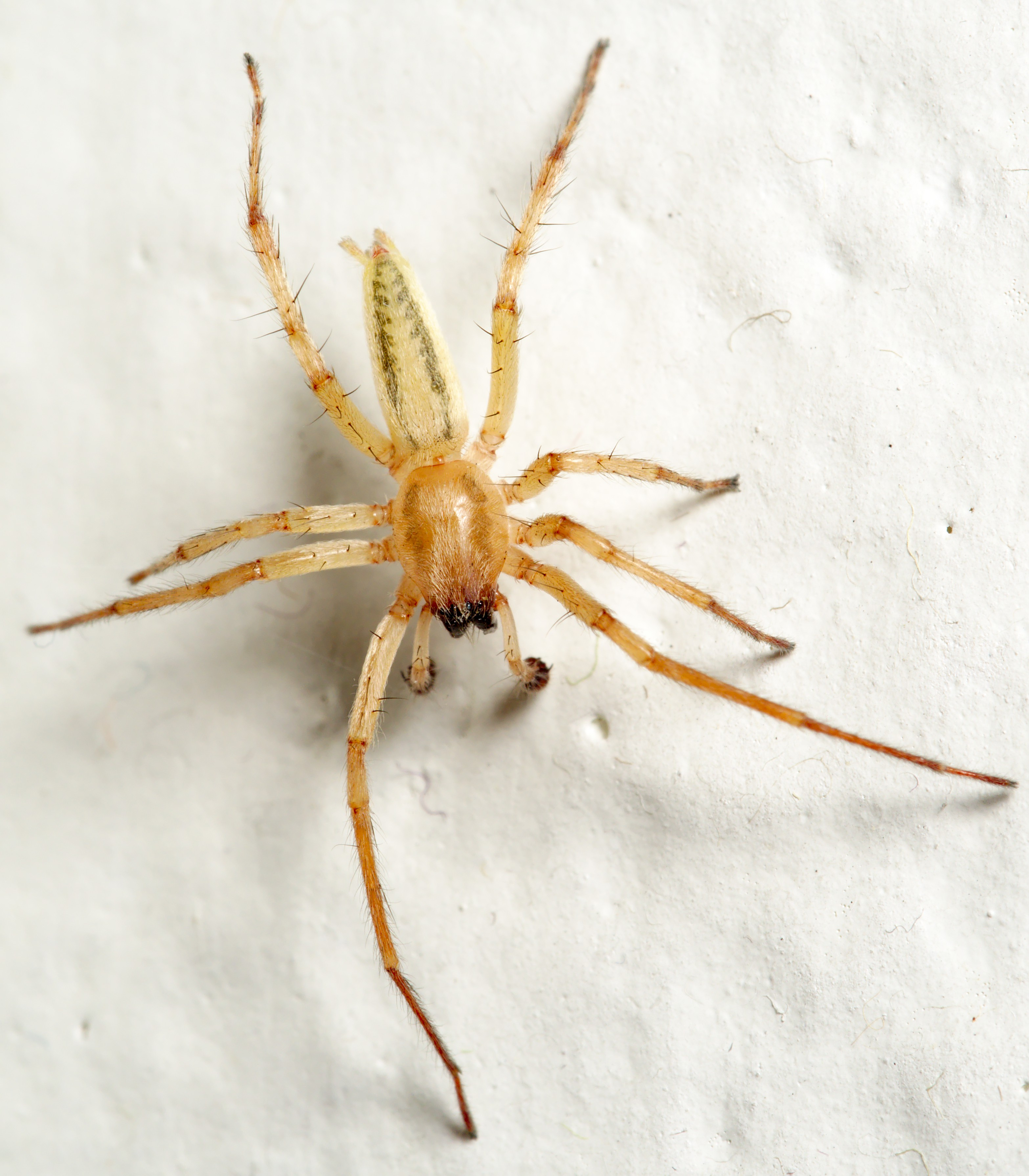
