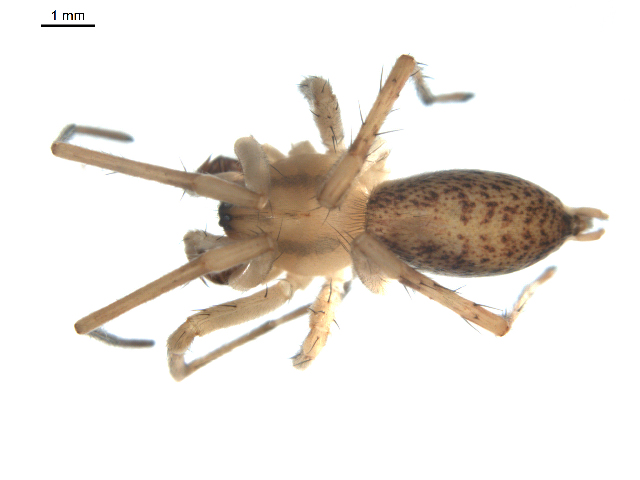
- H. gracilis, adult male
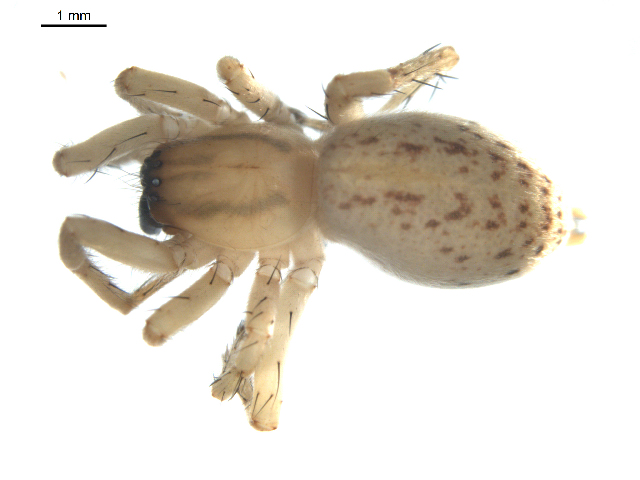
- H. gracilis, adult female

Scientific classification
- Domain: Eukaryota
- Kingdom: Animalia
- Phylum: Arthropoda
- Subphylum: Chelicerata
- Class: Arachnida
- Order: Araneae
- Infraorder: Araneomorphae
- Family: Anyphaenidae
- Genus: Hibana
- Species: H. gracilis

Binomial name
- Hibana gracilis (Hentz, 1847)

= Hibana gracilis =

Species of spider

Hibana gracilis, the garden ghost spider, is a species of ghost spider in the family Anyphaenidae. It is found in the United States and Canada.

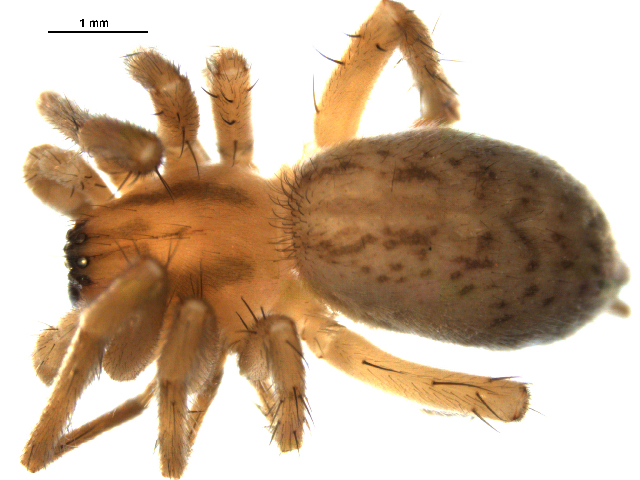
Garden ghost spider, Hibana gracilis
