= Thomas James (sea captain) =

Welsh sailor, navigator and explorer (1593–1635)

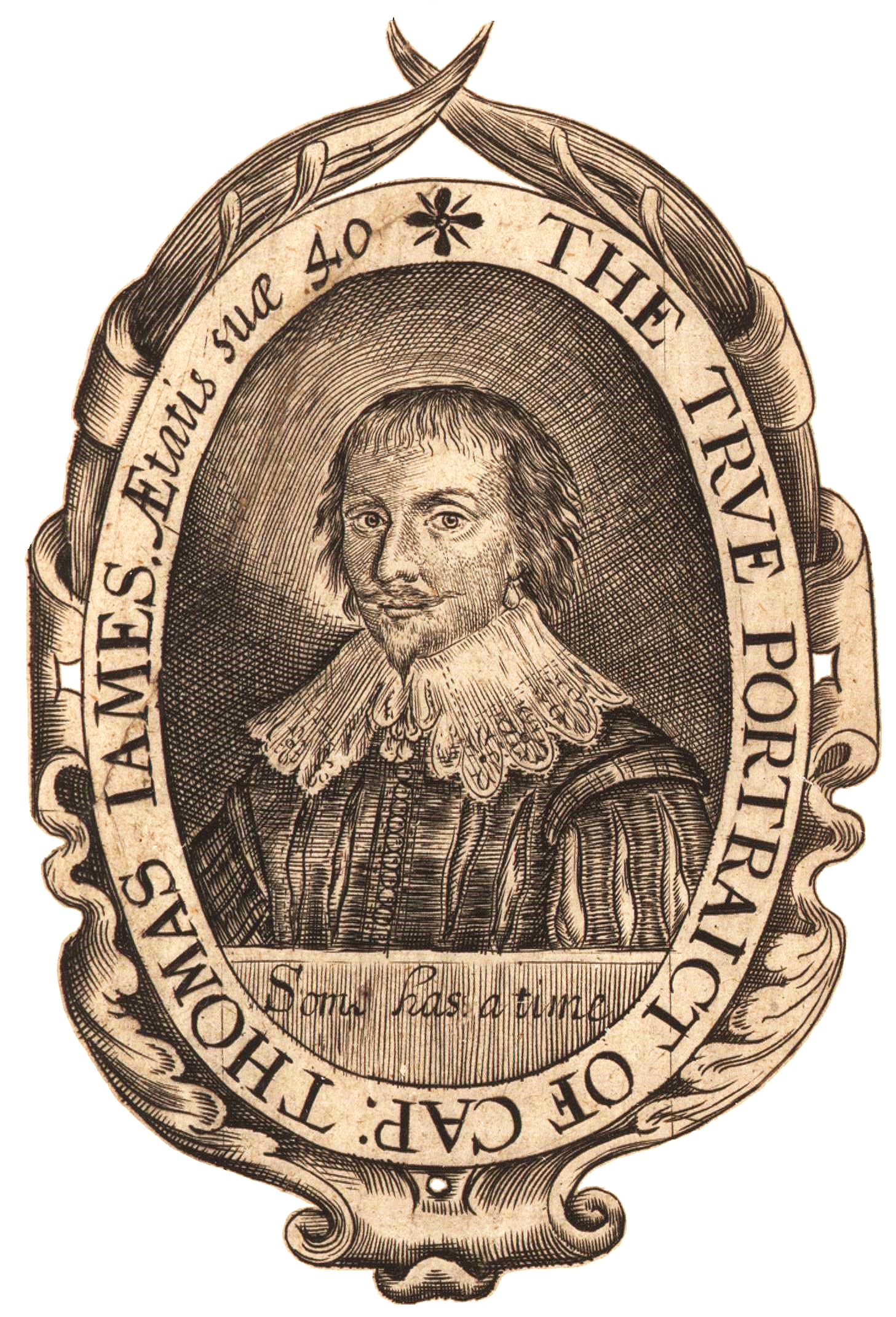
- Born: 1593; Abergavenny, Wales
- Died: 1635 (aged 41–42); Bristol, England
- Occupations: Sailor, navigator, explorer

Captain Thomas James (1593–1635) was a Welsh sailor, navigator and explorer, who set out to discover the Northwest Passage, the hoped for ocean route around the top of North America to Asia.

== Early life ==
James was probably born in 1590 at Wern-y-cym, near Abergavenny in Wales, the son of James ap John ap Richard Herbert. He trained as a lawyer in London but at some point after 1612 he abandoned this life and became a mariner. By 1628, he was the captain of a privateer, the Dragon of Bristol. When the Society of Merchant Venturers of Bristol appointed him to lead their expedition in 1631, they referred to him as skilled navigator and mathematician, suggesting he was both experienced and respected.

== Expedition of 1631–32 ==
James's map of his 1631-1632 exploration of Hudson Bay and James Bay

James left Bristol in May 1631 on Henrietta Maria, took a month to pass Hudson Strait, was blocked by ice from going north, went west, met Luke Foxe on 29 July, reached land near Churchill, Manitoba on 11 August, went southeast to the entrance of James Bay at Cape Henrietta Maria (which James named after the wife of King Charles I), went down the west shore of James Bay and in October chose Charlton Island as a wintering post. On 29 November, the ship was deliberately sunk to keep her from being swept away or crushed by ice. The ship was refloated in June. He left of 1 July 1632, took 3 weeks to exit James Bay, worked his way north through ice, reached the mouth of Hudson Strait, went north into Foxe Channel only to 65°30', turned back and reached Bristol on 22 October in a vessel that was barely seaworthy.

He named the southern coast of Hudson Bay the "New Principality of South Wales", after his native land. James' harrowing experiences during his voyage, in which he repeatedly came close to death in the ice of the Arctic Ocean, are recounted in his published account of the voyage, The Strange and Dangerous Voyage of Captaine Thomas James, published in 1633.

Some critics have opined that Samuel Taylor Coleridge's work The Rime of the Ancient Mariner was inspired by James' experience in the Arctic. Anne Fleming's 2024 novel Curiosities includes an account of the grim winter James and his crew spent on an island in James Bay.

== Contemporary accounts ==
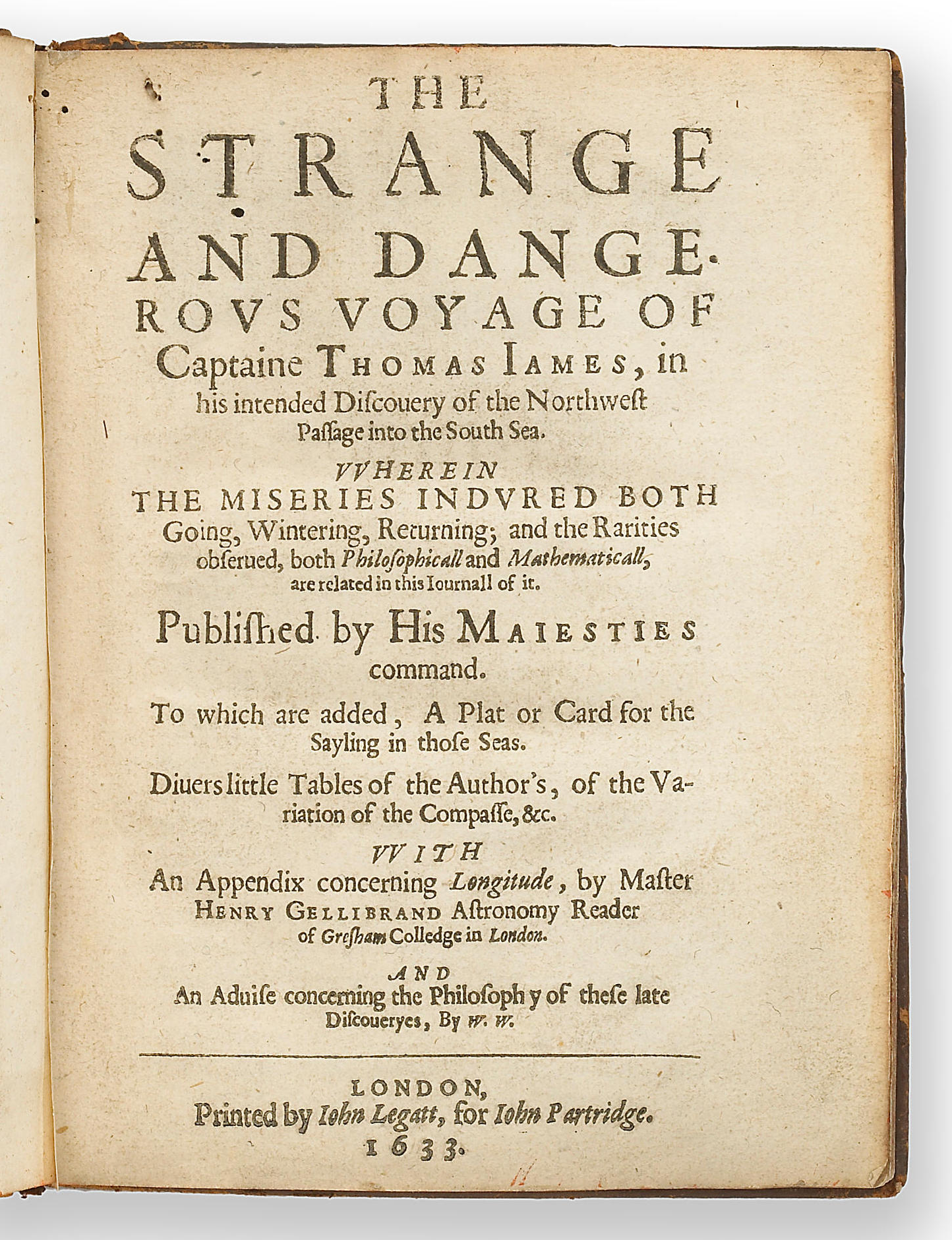
Title page of James's voyage account (1633)

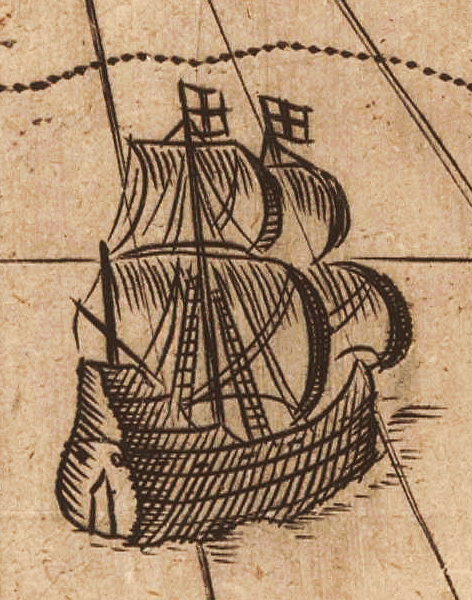
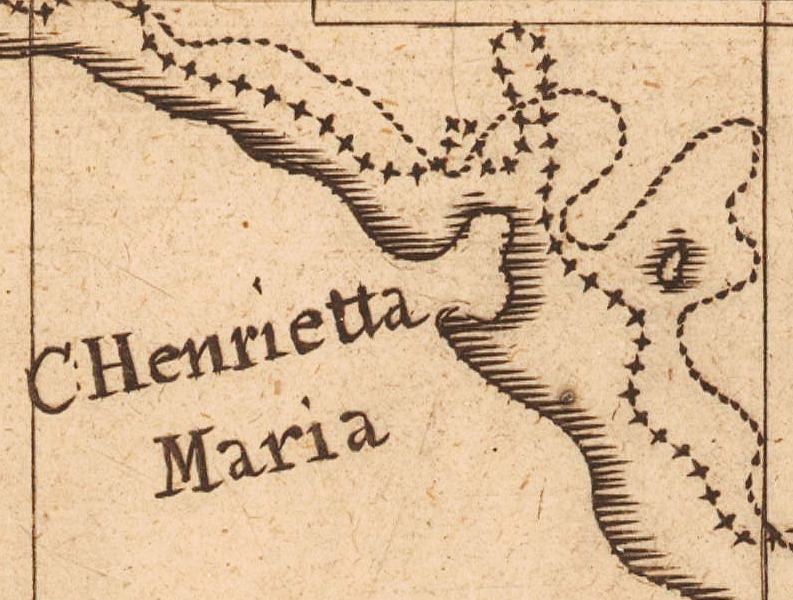
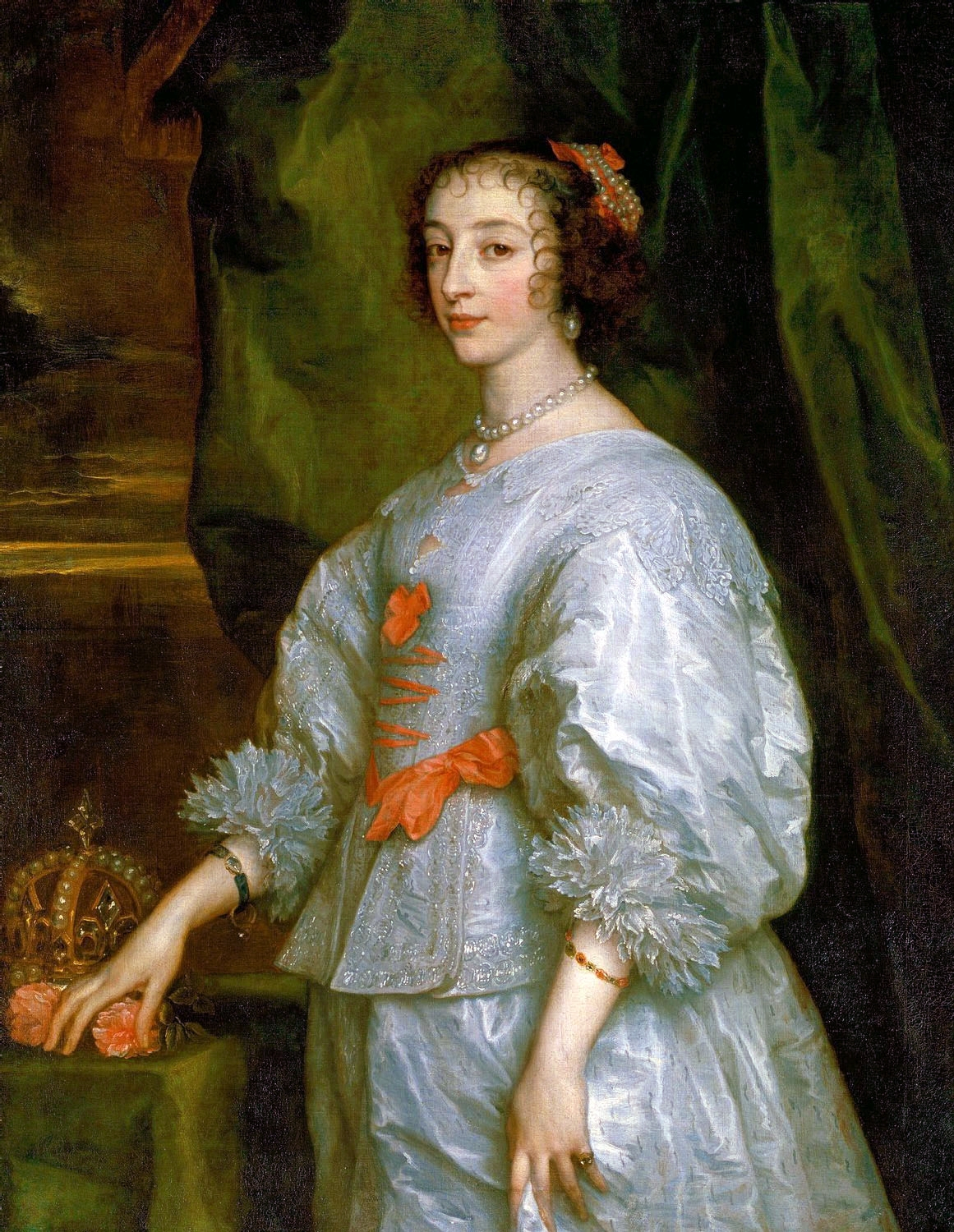
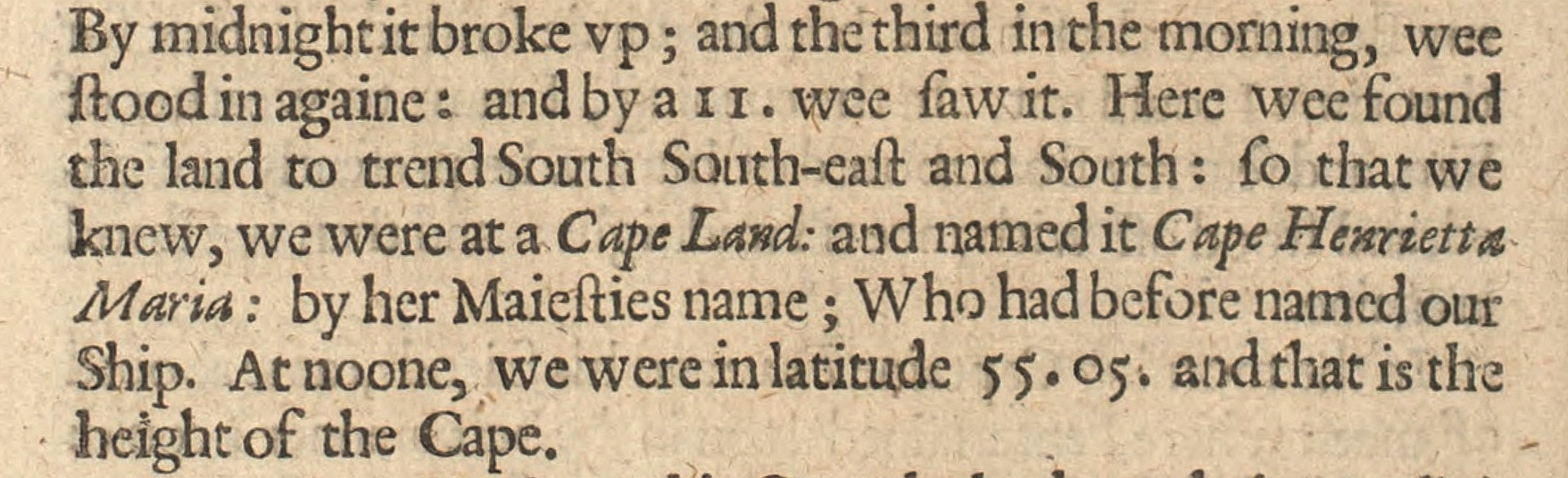
Two map details and an excerpt from James's voyage account, where he tells how, on 3 September 1631, Cape Henrietta Maria was named after England's Queen consort (shown here in a 1632 portrait by van Dyck), as already was James's ship, the Henrietta Maria.
- James, T. (1633). The strange and dangerous voyage of Captaine Thomas James, in his intended discovery of the Northwest Passage into the South Sea wherein the miseries indured both going, wintering, returning, and the rarities observed, both philosophicall and mathematicall, are related in this journall of it, published by His Majesties command : to which are added a plat or card for the sayling in those seas, divers little tables of the author's, of the variation of the compasse, &c. : with an appendix concerning longitude, by Master Henry Geophy of these late discoveries by W.W. London: Printed by John Legatt, for John Partridge. ISBN 0-665-35345-6.
