= HDMS Enhiørningen (1609) =

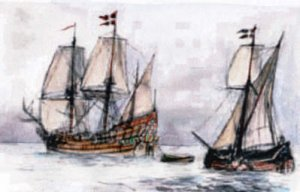
- Enhiørningen (left), together with HDMS Lamprenen in a modern artist's conception

History

Denmark–Norway
- Name: Enhiørningen
- Builder: Copenhagen
- Laid down: 1609
- Fate: Abandoned, 1620

General characteristics
- Class & type: frigate
- Propulsion: Sails
- Sail plan: Full-rigged

Enhiørningen or Enhjørningen (Danish for Unicorn) was a frigate built in Copenhagen for the navy of Denmark–Norway.

Enhiørningen was the ship of Danish-Norwegian explorer Jens Munk on his journey to the Hudson Bay i 1619-1620 (together with the navy yacht Lamprenen). Ships and crews overwintered in the mouth of Churchill River. All but Jens Munk and two sailors succumbed to scurvy during the winter. The three survivors returned to Bergen with Lamprenen and abandoned Enhiørningen. The cannons of the ship were found in the 18th century and the remains of the wreck itself rediscovered in 1964.

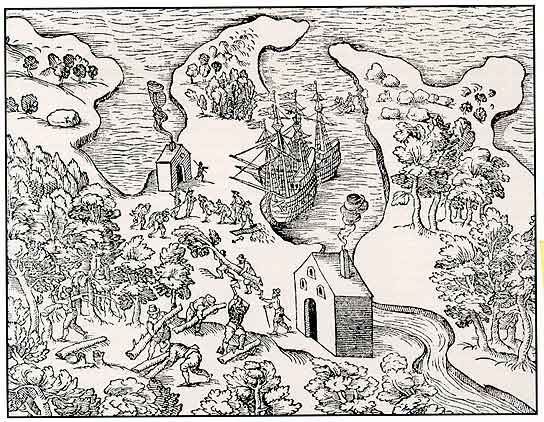
Contemporary illustration of Munk's ships in Hudson Bay. From the book Navigatio septemtrionalis (1624).
