= HDMS Lamprenen =

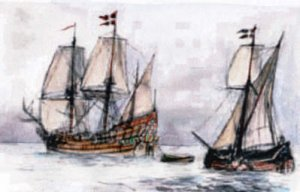
- Lamprenen (right), together with HDMS Enhiørningen in a modern artist's conception

History

Sweden
- Name: Lamprellen
- Captured: 1612
- Fate: Seized by the Danish King

History

Denmark–Norway
- Name: Lamprenen
- Acquired: 1612
- Out of service: 1628
- Fate: Sunk at the Weser in 1628

General characteristics
- Class & type: Yacht
- Propulsion: Sails
- Sail plan: Lateen

Lamprenen (Danish) or Lamprellen (Swedish), both meaning the lamprey was a one-masted Swedish navy-yacht. It was sunk by the navy of Denmark–Norway during the siege of the castle Älvsborg (outside modern day Gothenburg) as part of the Kalmar war. After the castle was captured, Lamprenen was taken to Copenhagen as a Danish prize and entered the Royal Dano-Norwegian Navy.

Lamprenen was part of the journey of Danish-Norwegian explorer Jens Munk to the Hudson Bay i 1619-1620 (together with the larger frigate Enhiørningen). Ships and crews overwintered in the mouth of Churchill River. All but Jens Munk and two sailors succumbed to scurvy during the winter. The three survivors returned to Bergen with Lamprenen and abandoned Enhiørningen.

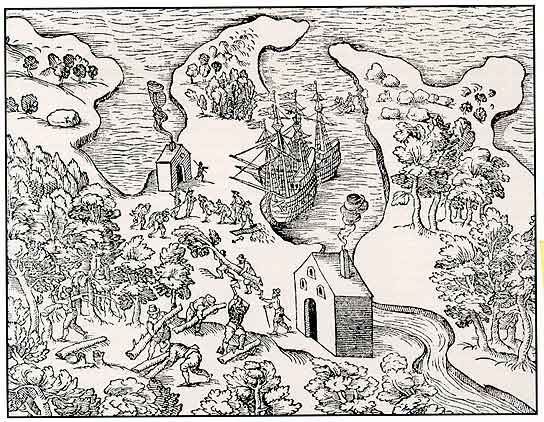
Contemporary illustration of Munk's ships in Hudson Bay. From the book Navigatio septemtrionalis (1624).

Lamprenen took part in the thirty years' war in the navy of Danish Christian IV. It was damaged and sunk in battle in the mouth of the German river Weser.
