= Foxe Channel =

Area of sea in Qikiqtaaluk Region, Nunavut, Canada

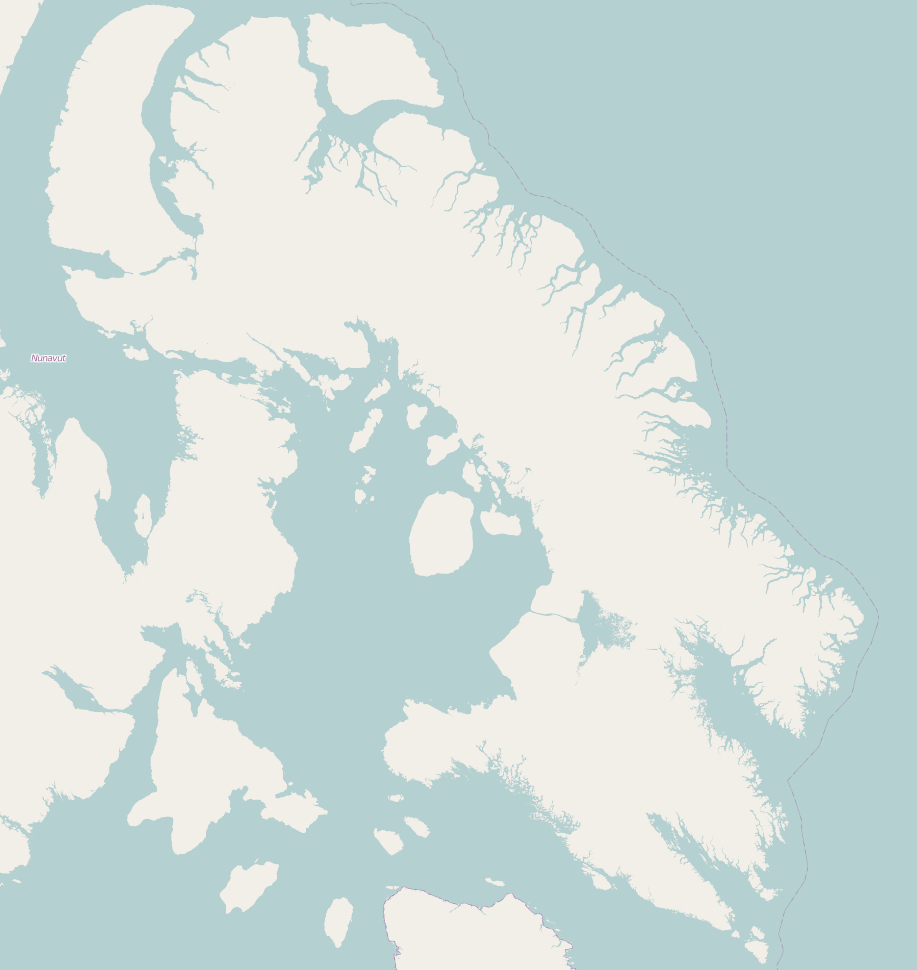
Foxe Channel near Baffin Island

Foxe Channel (65°N 80°W), formerly Fox Channel is an area of sea in Qikiqtaaluk Region, Nunavut, Canada. It separates the Foxe Basin (to the north) from Hudson Bay and the Hudson Strait (to the south). To the west and south-west is Southampton Island, to the east is Baffin Island, and to the north-west is the Melville Peninsula.

The channel takes its name from the English explorer Luke Foxe who reached it in 1631.
