= Luke Foxe =

English explorer (1586 – 1635)

- Born: 20 October 1586; Kingston-upon-Hull, England
- Died: c. 15 July 1635; Whitby, England
- Occupations: sea captain, explorer

Luke Foxe (or Fox) (20 October 1586 – c. 15 July 1635) was an English explorer, born in Kingston-upon-Hull, Yorkshire, who searched for the Northwest Passage across North America. In 1631, he sailed much of the western Hudson Bay before concluding no such passage was possible. Foxe Basin, Foxe Channel and Foxe Peninsula were named after him.

He left the Thames in May 1631 in the Charles, took 20 days to work through Hudson Strait, reaching the Bay on 11 July. Blocked by ice to the northward, he went south of Southampton Island to Roes Welcome Sound and south along the west shore to Port Nelson, Manitoba where he found Thomas Button's winter camp of 18 years before, turned north-east, met Thomas James on 29 August, went north into Foxe Channel and into the lower part of Foxe Basin, turned back at 66°47'N, passed Hudson Strait in 10 days and reached England in October without any deaths among his crew.

== Early life ==
The son of Richard Fox, seaman and assistant of the Trinity House at Kingston-upon-Hull, he was born at Hull 20 October 1586. He acquired knowledge of seamanship in voyages southward to France, Spain, and the Mediterranean, and northward to the Baltic, Denmark, and Norway, also working along the coasts of England and crossing the North Sea. In 1606 he offered his services as mate to John Knight for a voyage to Greenland, but was rejected as too young.

== Greenland voyage ==
After Hawkridge's abortive voyage of 1619, Foxe became the successor of Robert Bylot and William Baffin (1615) in Arctic exploration. In the meantime voyages had been made by Sir Thomas Button in 1612, by Henry Hudson in 1606, after George Waymouth in 1585-7 [probably 1605]. Foxe's first patron was Henry Briggs, who with Sir John Brooke, directed royal attention to Foxe's voyage. The project first took shape in 1629, in a Petition of Luke Fox to the king for a small supply of money towards the discovery of a passage by the north-west to the South Sea, Hudson and Sir Thomas Button having discovered a great way, and given great hopes of opening the rest. A pinnace of the Royal Navy of seventy tons was placed at the disposal of the adventurers, but the setting forth was deferred until the following year. In the interval Briggs died; half the adventurers having dropped out, the voyage might have been abandoned, but for news that Bristol merchants had projected a similar voyage from their port (under Thomas James, leaving left Bristol 3 May 1631). London merchants, with Sir Thomas Roe and the merchant-adventurer Sir John Wolstenholme, supported Foxe in the Charles pinnace with a crew of twenty men and two boys victualled for eighteen months.

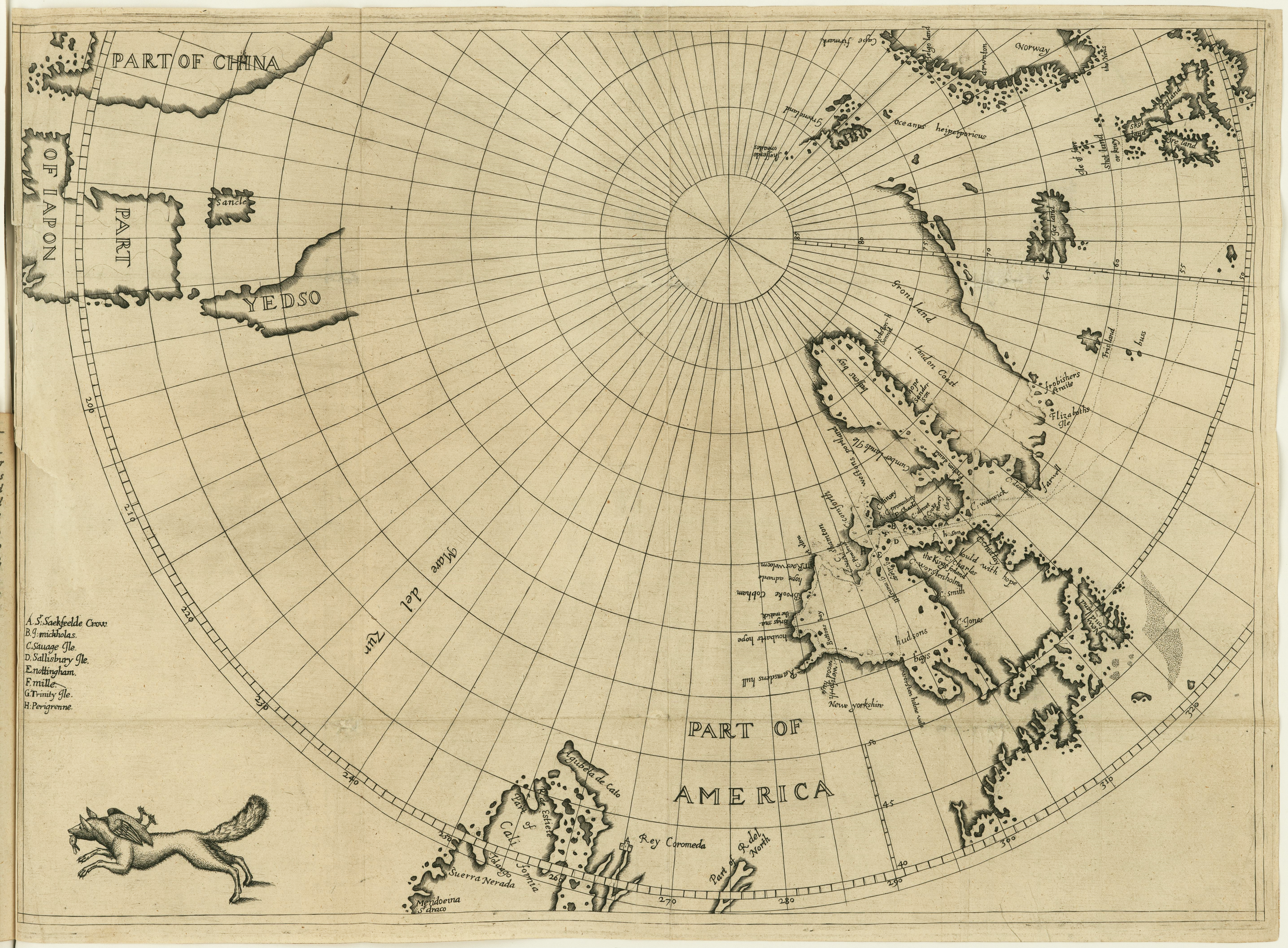
Foxe's polar map of North America and of his 1631 exploration of Hudson Bay

Foxe sailed from the Pool below London Bridge 30 April 1631. He anchored off Whitby, where he landed, and reached Kirkwall in Orkney on 19 May. Sailing due west on the sixtieth parallel he made land 20 June on the north side of Frobisher Bay; two days later he sighted Cape Chidley, off the south shore of Hudson's Strait, six leagues distant. Passing Resolution Island two leagues south on 23 June, his crew saw in the harbour on the west side the smoke of the camp-fire of Captain James, who had put in there for repairs. From this date until 11 July Foxe worked his way along the north shore of Hudson's Strait until he reached a position between Mill and Salisbury Islands.

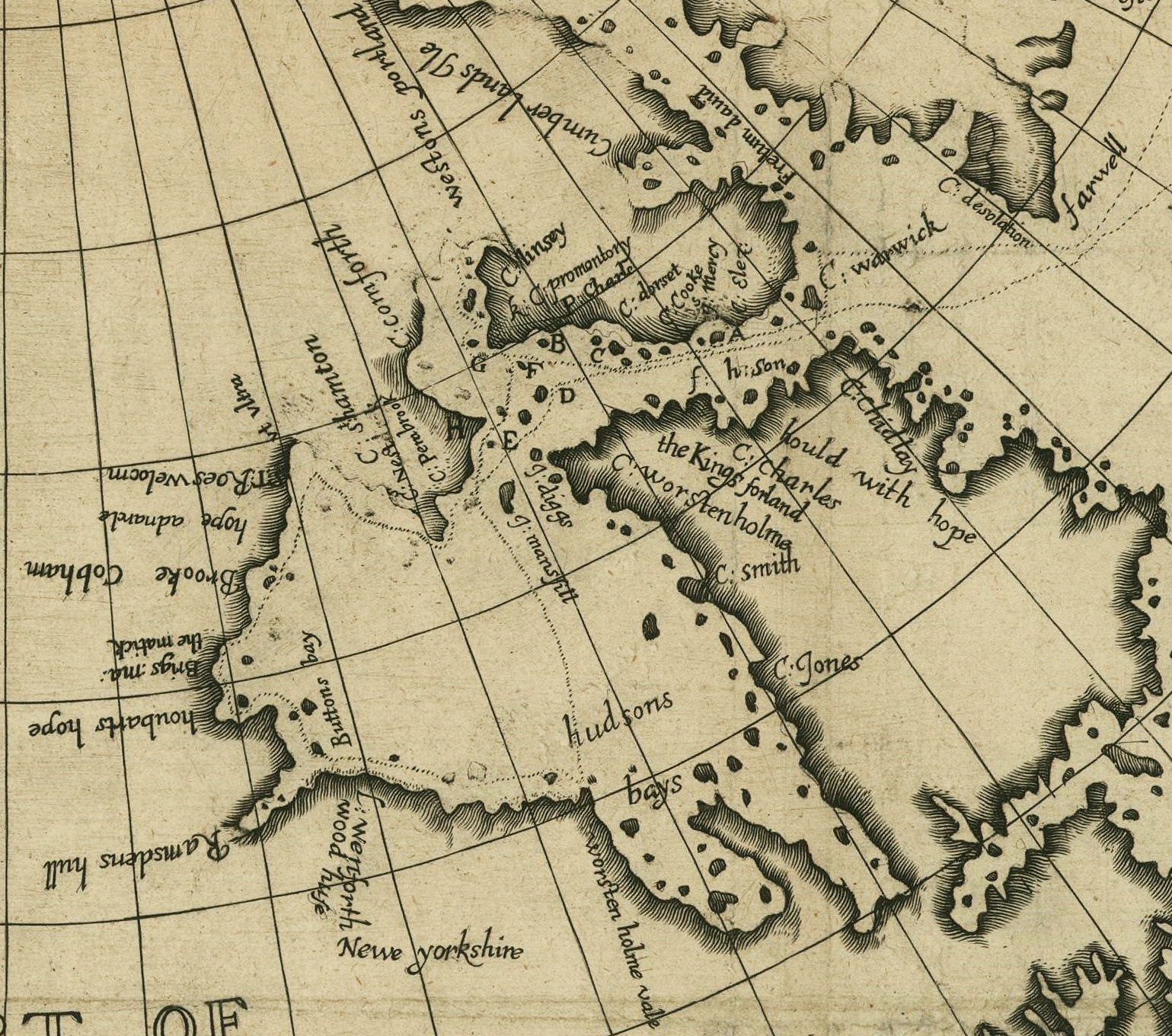
Detail from Foxe's map showing his route through Hudson Strait and in Hudson Bay

From this point Foxe sailed south of Coats Island until 19 July, when he commenced his search for the north-west passage. On 27 July he reached the furthest point of Button's voyage, on Southampton Island, where he found traces of native sepulture. Prohibited by his instructions from proceeding to a higher latitude than 63° N. in this direction, he turned southward along the west shore of Hudson Bay until 27 August, when he entered the mouth of the Nelson River, where he found the remaining half of an inscribed board erected by Button, which he replaced by a new one of his own. He sailed on E.S.E. sixty-one leagues until 30 August, when he met his rival, Captain James, in the Maria of Bristol, with whom, after some trouble in getting on board, he dined and spent seventeen hours.

Foxe then proceeded on his course down to 55° 14', later known as Cape Henrietta Maria, at the head of James Bay. On 3 September he turned the head of his ship northward until he reached Cape Pembroke on Coats Island five days later. From 15 to 20 September Foxe made observations on the channel that bears his name on the west shore of what is now Baffin Land. On 22 September he turned homeward, among the numerous islands and sounds off the north shore of Hudson's Strait. Foxe found himself once more off Resolution Island, at the entrance to the strait. On 5 October he made Cape Chidley.

Foxe's course homeward was south-east to the English Channel instead of the shorter, but more dangerous one by way of the North Sea. On 31 October he came into the Downs with all his crew safe.

== Later life ==
Foxe was financially burdened after the voyage. He became a younger brother of Trinity House, and died at Whitby in July 1635.

== Works ==
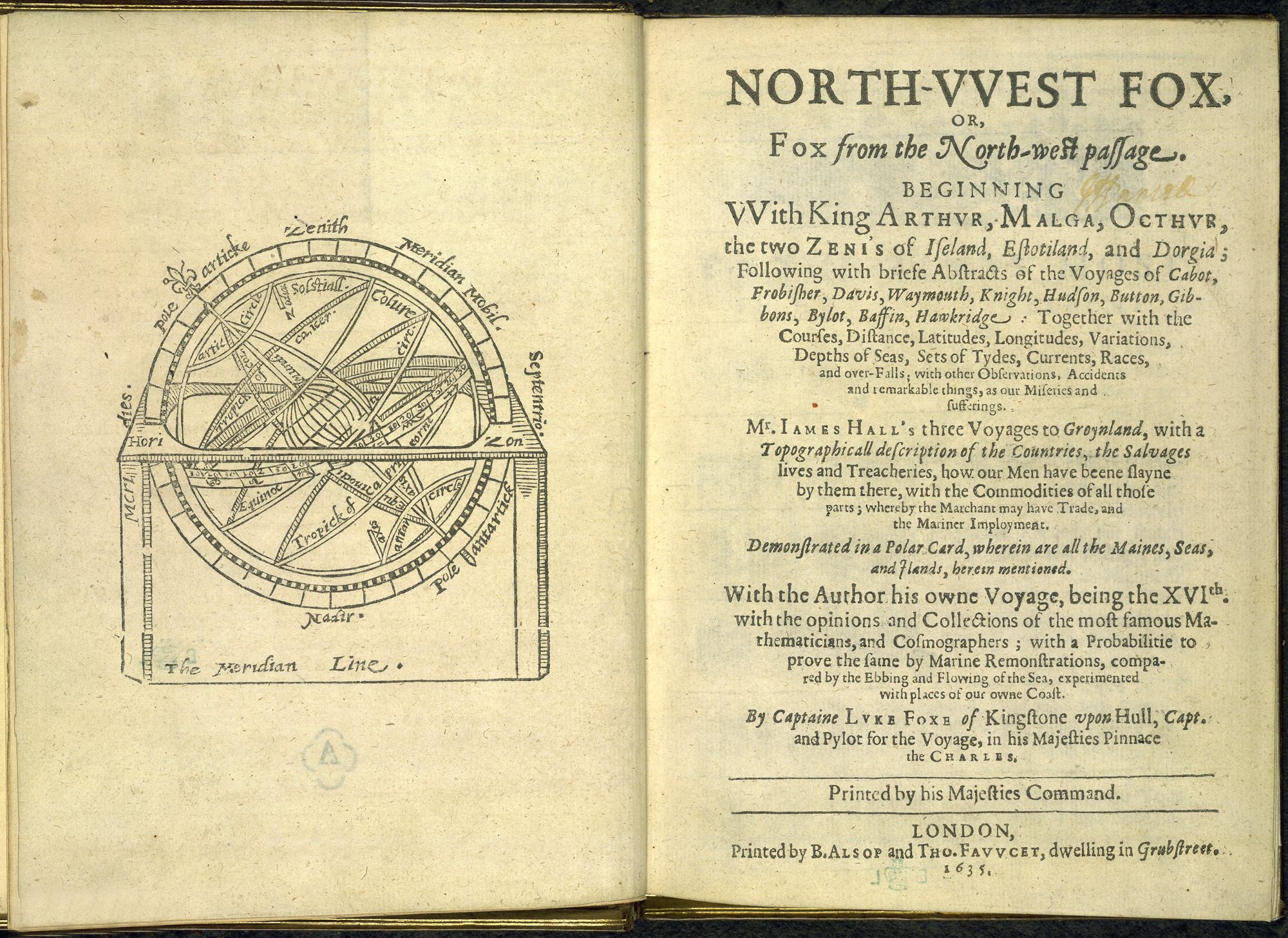
Frontispiece and title page of Foxe's voyage account (1635)

Foxe is best known for the work which contains the results of his voyage: North-west Fox, or Fox from the Northwest Passage . . . with briefe Abstracts of the Voyages of Cabot, Frobisher, Davis, Weymouth, Knight, Hudson, Button, Gibbons, Bylot, Baffin, Hawkridge ... Mr. James Hall's three Voyages to Groynland ... with the Author his owne Voyage, being the xvith ... T. Fawcett and B. Alsop, imp. London, 1635. It was entered at the Stationers' Company on 15 December 1634. It was accompanied by a large folded map of the Arctic regions.

In his book North-West Fox, on page 319 of the second volume of the Hakluyt Society’s edition, he mentions an isle at 64 d. 10 m. of latitude, which he states contains the remains of savages, none of which lies longer than 4 feet. He further claims that they were left on the stony ground under sleds, all facing westward. This claim would be the only report of “little people” by a European in North America. However, there is no island in that location, though he may be referring to one of the islands in the southern end for Foxe Channel.

== Legacy ==
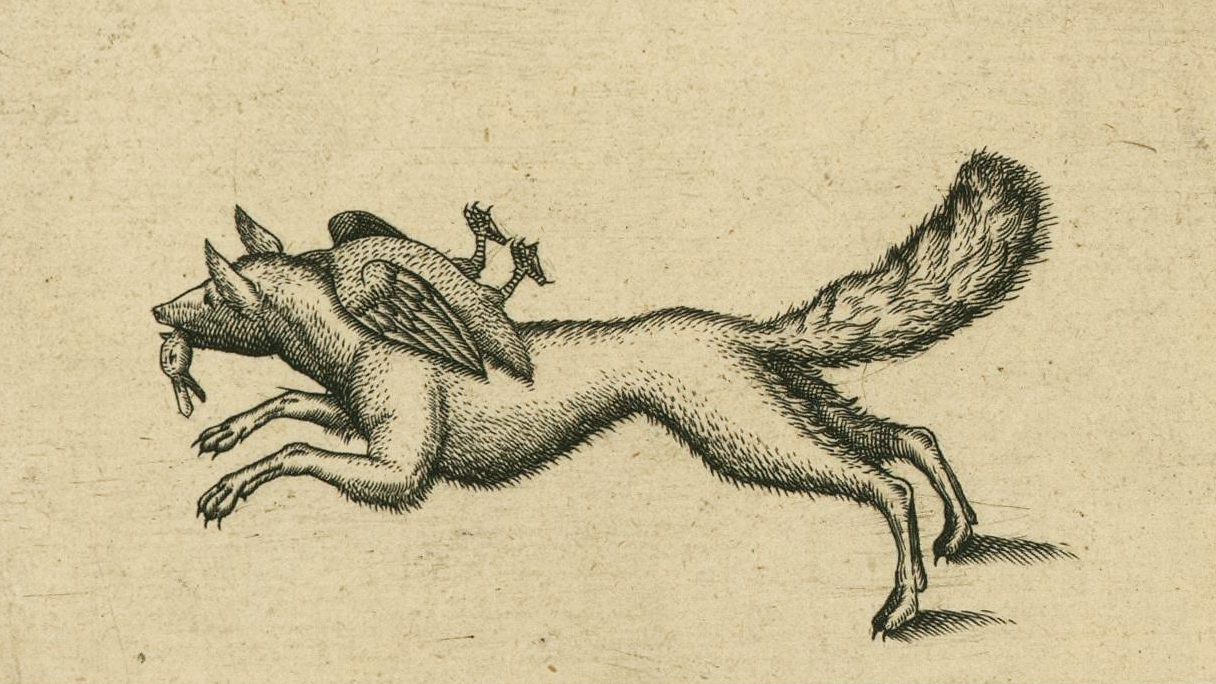
There is no known portrait of Foxe, but he left a visual pun signature of a fox grabbing a goose at the bottom left of his map.

Foxe gave names to 27 locations during his voyages, eight of which exist in current usage. These include Roe's Welcome Sound, named after his friend and sponsor, Sir Thomas Roe and Cape Dorset, named after Edward Sackville, 4th Earl of Dorset on 24 September 1631. In the 20th century this cape gave its name to the Dorset culture – a Paleo-Eskimo culture (500 BC – AD 1500) that preceded the Inuit culture in Arctic North America – whose remains were first found there.

Thus, this name could also be indirectly attributed to Captain Foxe.

== See also ==
- Ottawa Islands
