= Eddy Island =

Island in Nunavut, Canada

- Location within Nunavut Location within Canada

Geography
- Location: Hudson Bay
- Coordinates: 59°25′59″N 80°28′00″W
- Archipelago: Ottawa Islands; Arctic Archipelago
- Area: 12 km^{2} (4.6 sq mi)
- Coastline: 24 km (14.9 mi)

Administration
- Canada
- Nunavut: Nunavut
- Region: Qikiqtaaluk

Demographics
- Population: Uninhabited
- Source: Eddy Island at Atlas of Canada

Eddy Island is an uninhabited island in Qikiqtaaluk Region, Nunavut, Canada. Situated in the eastern portion of Hudson Bay, it is one of 24 islands that make up the Ottawa Islands.

Other islands in the vicinity include J. Gordon Island, Pattee Island, Gilmour Island, and Perley Island.
