= Eleanor Island =

Eleanor Island may refer to:

- Eleanor Island (Alaska)
- Eleanor Island (Canada)
- Eleanor Island (New Zealand)
