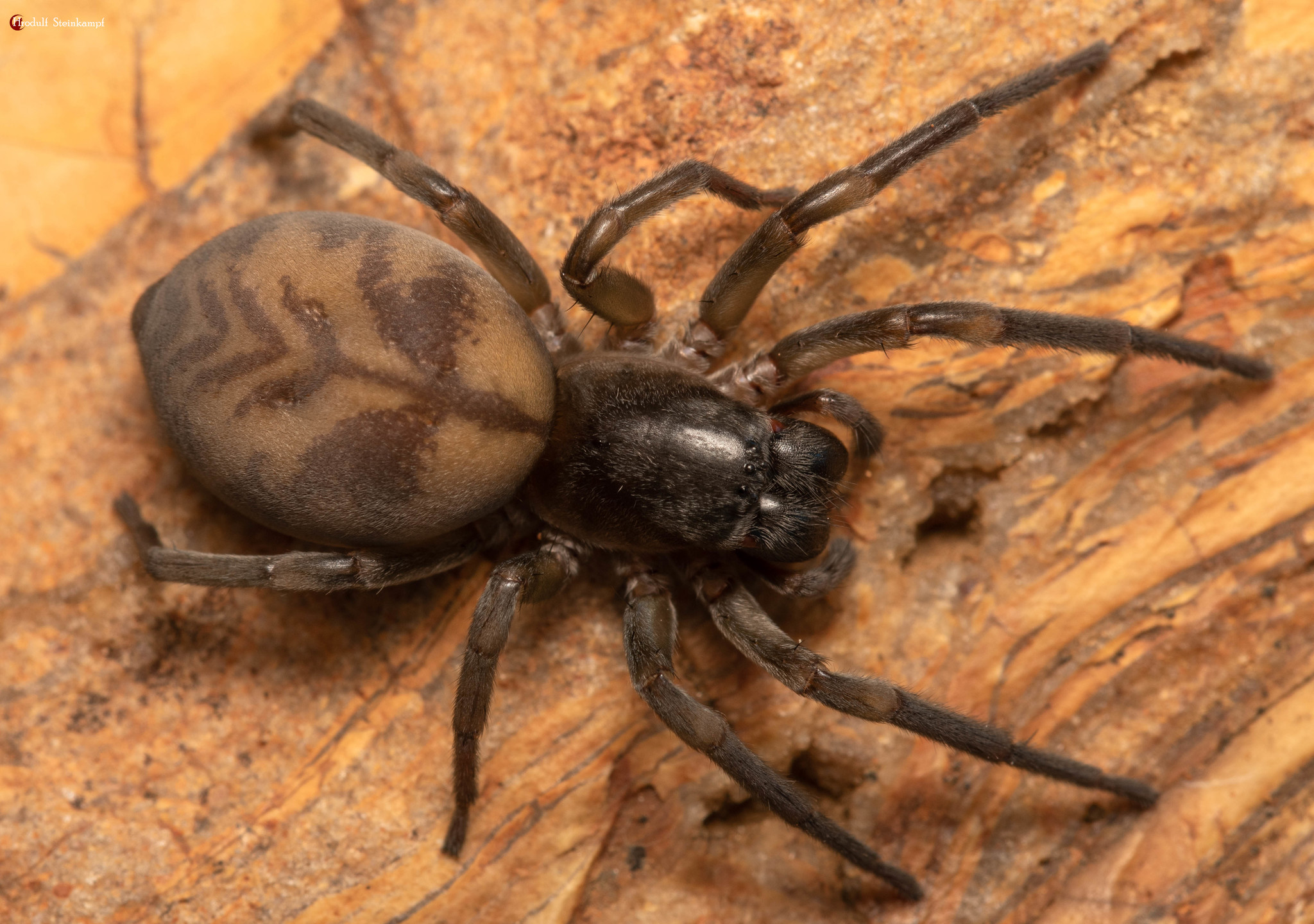
- A. africana, adult female

Conservation status
- Least Concern (IUCN 3.1)

Scientific classification
- Kingdom: Animalia
- Phylum: Arthropoda
- Subphylum: Chelicerata
- Class: Arachnida
- Order: Araneae
- Infraorder: Araneomorphae
- Family: Anyphaenidae
- Genus: Amaurobioides
- Species: A. africana

Binomial name
- Amaurobioides africana Hewitt, 1917

Synonyms
- Amaurobioides africanus Hewitt, 1917

= Amaurobioides africana =

African sea-shore spider

Species of spider

Amaurobioides africana is a species of spider of the genus Amaurobioides. It is endemic to southern Africa, where it inhabits rocky coastal areas.

== Taxonomy ==
The species was originally described by John Hewitt in 1917 as Amaurobioides africanus, based on specimens collected at East London by Dr. Geo. Rattray and his son. The species was later transferred to feminine gender as A. africana. It had previously been considered a synonym of Amaurobioides maritima but was recognized as a distinct species by Lehtinen in 1967.

== Distribution ==
Amaurobioides africana has been recorded from coastal regions of South Africa and Namibia. In South Africa, the species occurs along rocky coastlines from East London in the Eastern Cape to several localities in the Western Cape and northward to Port Nolloth in the Northern Cape. Its extent of occurrence is approximately 294,238 km², with an area of occupancy of 44 km².

The discovery of this species on African shores raised questions about the biogeography of the genus Amaurobioides. Hewitt noted that the species closely resembles other members of the genus, particularly Amaurobioides maritima from New Zealand and A. piscator from the Campbell Islands. The genus shows a remarkable disjunct distribution in the Southern Hemisphere, with species recorded from Southern Africa, Madagascar, New Zealand, Australia, Tasmania, and Chile.

Hewitt suggested that the wide distribution of these intertidal spiders might be explained through passive dispersal on floating seaweeds. This hypothesis is supported by the spiders' occurrence among entangled seaweeds at low water and their ability to survive submersion in waterproof silk-lined retreats.

The pattern of ocean currents in the southern Indian Ocean provides a plausible mechanism for such dispersal. A strong western equatorial current meets the east coasts of Madagascar and mainland Africa before being deflected southwards, gradually diminishing as it approaches Cape Agulhas.

Additionally, an antarctic current flows in a south-easterly direction from the Cape to Australia, dividing into portions that run along Australia's south coast and northward into the equatorial region. Many tropical and subtropical marine algae are transported to Natal and Cape Agulhas by these warm currents flowing southward from the Indian Ocean, potentially carrying spider passengers.

== Habitat ==
Amaurobioides africana is a free-running ground dweller found exclusively on rocky coasts. The species inhabits the higher shore regions in the zone extending from high water neaps to high water springs, an area infrequently flooded by salt water. In areas with strong wave action, spiders line the interior of empty shells with silk to make them waterproof, retaining enough air to survive periods of prolonged immersion. Their retreats are mainly located in crevices or under rocks in the spray zone, while in areas with weak wave action, they take refuge under rocks and seldom build nests.

== Description ==
The species shows pronounced sexual dimorphism, with females being larger than males.

Females have a total length of 13 mm with a carapace length of 4.5 mm. The carapace is brown, becoming black-brown on the ocular area. The chelicerae are black-brown throughout except for the terminal half of the fang, which is reddish. The upper surface of the opisthosoma is yellow with a distinctive pattern of six dark transverse chevrons, with the three anterior ones being connected by a median stripe. The epigyne features a fairly large genital plate with a median rounded area that is strongly convex, bounded on either side by a deep furrow.

Males are smaller, with a total length of 9.8 mm and a carapace length of 3.75 mm. The male carapace is more decidedly narrowed anteriorly than that of the female. The fangs are weaker than those of females, and the pedipalp extends only slightly beyond the apex of the femur of the first leg.

Both sexes have legs with the first being slightly longer than the second, which is distinctly longer than the fourth, while the third leg is shortest.

== Ecology ==
The species serves as a host for the intertidal spider egg parasitoid scelionine wasp Echthrodesis lamorali.

== Conservation status ==
Amaurobioides africana is classified as Least Concern due to its wide geographical range and lack of known threats. The species is partly protected within the De Hoop Nature Reserve.
