= Catherine Island =

Catherine Island may refer to:

- Catherine Island (New Zealand)
- Catherine Island (Alaska), United States
- Île Caterine (Catherine Island, off the coast of Rodrigues, Mauritius at 19°45′00″S 63°19′20″E)

== See also ==
- St. Catherine's Island, Georgia, United States
- Katharine Island, part of Ujae Atoll in the Marshall Islands
