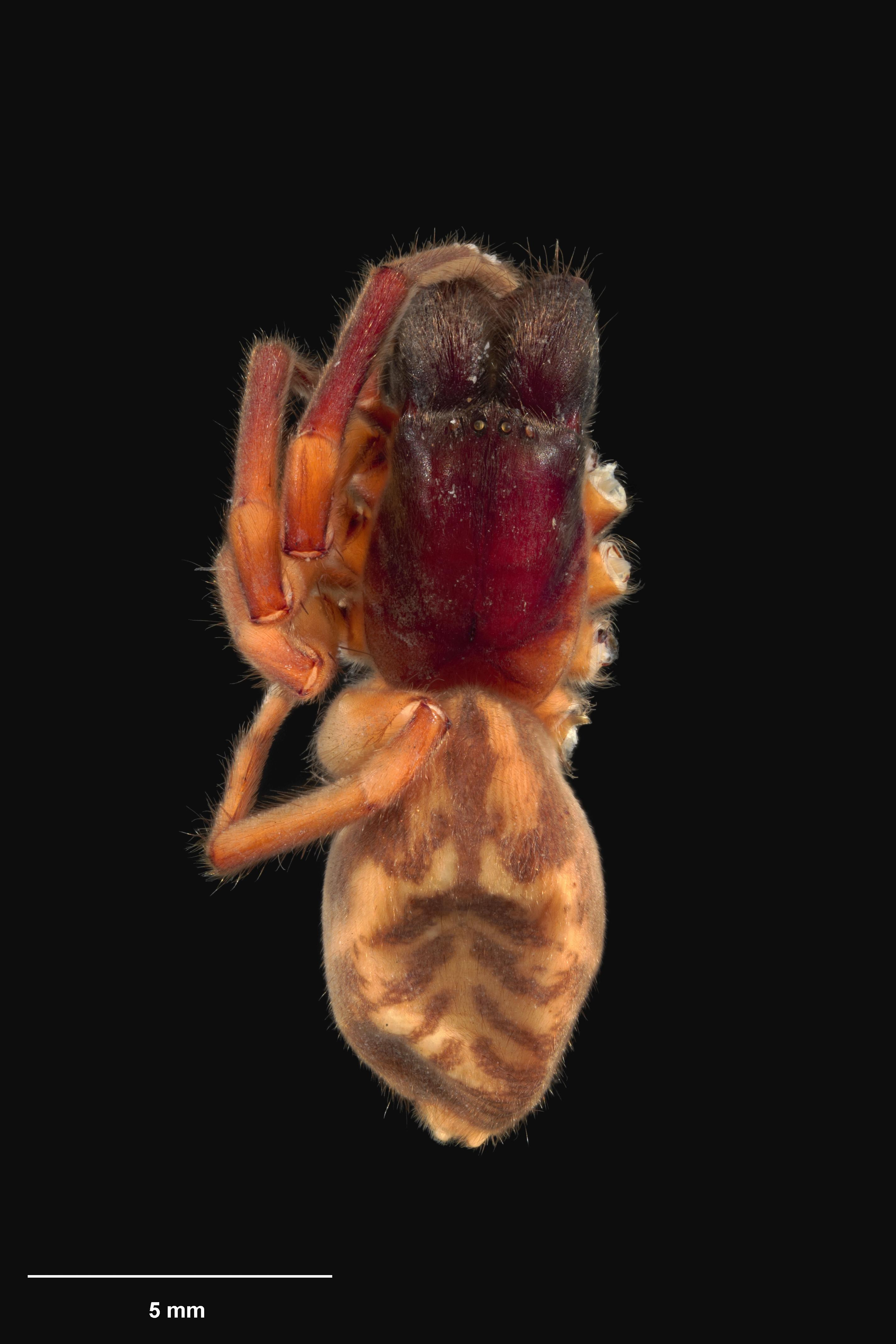

Conservation status
- Data Deficit (NZ TCS)

Scientific classification
- Kingdom: Animalia
- Phylum: Arthropoda
- Subphylum: Chelicerata
- Class: Arachnida
- Order: Araneae
- Infraorder: Araneomorphae
- Family: Anyphaenidae
- Genus: Amaurobioides
- Species: A. major

Binomial name
- Amaurobioides major Forster, 1970

= Amaurobioides major =

Species of spider

Amaurobioides major is a species of Anyphaenidae spider that is endemic to New Zealand.

== Taxonomy ==
This species was described in 1970 by Ray Forster from a female specimen collected in Caswell Sound. The holotype is stored in Te Papa Museum under registration number AS.000062.

== Description ==
The female is recorded at 11.72mm in length. This species has a reddish brown carapace and a brown abdomen that has pale chevron markings dorsally.

== Distribution ==
This species is only known from Caswell Sound in Fiordland, New Zealand. Like all Amaurobioides, it lives along the spray zone of rocky coasts.

== Conservation status ==
Under the New Zealand Threat Classification System, this species is listed as "Data Deficient" with the qualifiers of "Climate Impact", "Data Poor: Size", "Data Poor: Trend", "One Location" and "Range Restricted".
