= Amaurobioides piscator =

Conservation status
- Naturally Uncommon (NZ TCS)

Scientific classification
- Domain: Eukaryota
- Kingdom: Animalia
- Phylum: Arthropoda
- Subphylum: Chelicerata
- Class: Arachnida
- Order: Araneae
- Infraorder: Araneomorphae
- Family: Anyphaenidae
- Genus: Amaurobioides
- Species: A. piscator

Binomial name
- Amaurobioides piscator Hogg, 1909

Species of spider

Amaurobioides piscator is a species of Anyphaenidae spider that is endemic to New Zealand.

== Taxonomy ==
This species was described in 1909 by Henry Roughton Hogg from specimens collected on Campbell Island. It was most recently revised in 1970. The lectotype is stored in Otago Museum.

== Description ==
The female is recorded at 12.04mm in length whereas the male is 9.01mm. This species has a reddish brown carapace and a brown abdomen that has pale chevron markings dorsally.

== Distribution ==
This species is only known from Auckland Island and Campbell Island in New Zealand.

== Conservation status ==
Under the New Zealand Threat Classification System, this species is listed as "Naturally Uncommon" with the qualifiers of "Climate Impact" and "Range Restricted".
