= Irene River (New Zealand) =

River in Southland Region, New Zealand

- Route of the Irene River
- Mouth of the Irene River Irene River (New Zealand) (South Island)

Location
- Country: New Zealand

Physical characteristics
- Source
  - location: Museum Range
  - coordinates: 45°13′09″S 167°16′20″E
- Mouth
  - location: Taiporoporo / Charles Sound
  - coordinates: 45°06′29″S 167°12′59″E
- Length: 25 kilometres (16 mi)

Basin features
- Progression: Irene River → Taiporoporo / Charles Sound → Tasman Sea
- Tributaries
  - right: Marjorie Creek

The Irene River is a river of New Zealand, flowing into Charles Sound, Fiordland.

The river flows generally north from the northern slope of Coronation Peak, a mountain in the Museum Range of the Southern Alps. It follows a roughly semicircular path, initially flowing northeast before turning north, northwest, and finally west before entering the northern (Emelius) arm of Charles Sound.

== See also ==
- List of rivers of New Zealand
