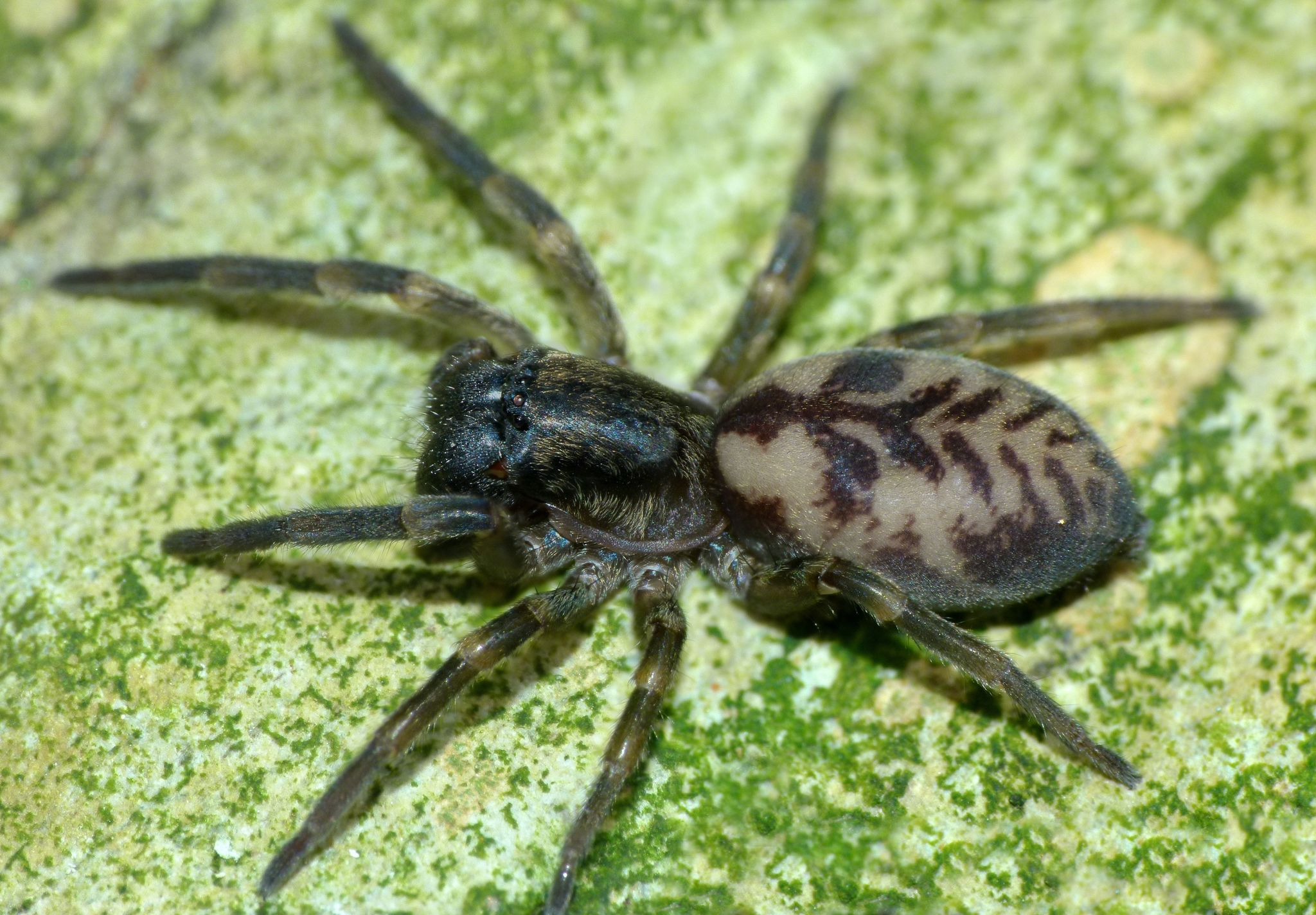
- A. maritima from New Zealand
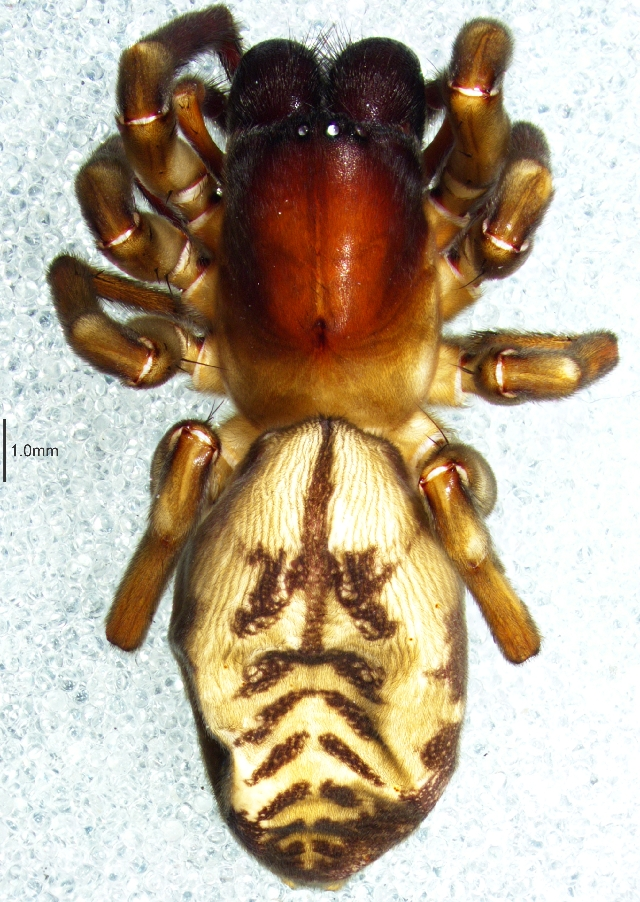
- A. africana, adult female

Scientific classification
- Kingdom: Animalia
- Phylum: Arthropoda
- Subphylum: Chelicerata
- Class: Arachnida
- Order: Araneae
- Infraorder: Araneomorphae
- Family: Anyphaenidae
- Genus: Amaurobioides; O. Pickard-Cambridge, 1883

Type species
- A. maritima O. Pickard-Cambridge, 1883

Species
- 12, see text

Synonyms
- Cluilius

= Amaurobioides =

Genus of spiders

Amaurobioides is a genus of anyphaenid sac spiders first described by O. Pickard-Cambridge in 1883.

== Distribution ==
The genus Amaurobioides shows a remarkable disjunct distribution across the Southern Hemisphere, with species found along the rocky coastlines of South Africa, Namibia, Madagascar, New Zealand, Australia, Tasmania, and Chile.

Hewitt (1917) proposed that the wide distribution might be explained through passive dispersal on floating seaweeds, facilitated by the ocean currents of the southern oceans. This hypothesis is supported by the genus's ecological preferences for intertidal zones and their ability to survive submersion in waterproof silk-lined retreats. The Antarctic Circumpolar Current and various equatorial currents in the Indian Ocean could provide mechanisms for such long-distance dispersal, potentially transporting spiders on drifting algae between continents.

== Species ==
As of October 2026, this genus includes twelve species:

- Amaurobioides africana Hewitt, 1917 – Namibia, South Africa
- Amaurobioides chilensis (Nicolet, 1849) – Chile
- Amaurobioides isolata Hirst, 1993 – Australia (South Australia)
- Amaurobioides litoralis Hickman, 1949 – Australia (Tasmania)
- Amaurobioides major Forster, 1970 – New Zealand
- Amaurobioides maritima O. Pickard-Cambridge, 1883 – New Zealand (type species)
- Amaurobioides minor Forster, 1970 – New Zealand
- Amaurobioides pallida Forster, 1970 – New Zealand
- Amaurobioides picuna Forster, 1970 – New Zealand
- Amaurobioides piscator Hogg, 1909 – New Zealand (Auckland Is., Campbell Is.)
- Amaurobioides pleta Forster, 1970 – New Zealand
- Amaurobioides pohara Forster, 1970 – New Zealand
