= Stillwater River (New Zealand) =

- Route of the Stillwater River
- Mouth of the Stillwater River Stillwater River (New Zealand) (South Island)

Location
- Country: New Zealand

Physical characteristics
- Source
  - coordinates: 45°03′08″S 167°30′24″E
- Mouth
  - location: Lake Marchant
  - coordinates: 45°03′17″S 167°19′47″E

Basin features
- Progression: Stillwater River → Lake Marchant → Taitetimu / Caswell Sound → Tasman Sea
- Tributaries
  - left: Feldspar Stream
  - right: Ethne Stream, Madman Stream, Expectation Stream
- Waterfalls: Twin Falls

The Stillwater River is a river in New Zealand, flowing into Caswell Sound, Fiordland.

== See also ==
- List of rivers of New Zealand
