= Amaurobioides pleta =

Conservation status
- Naturally Uncommon (NZ TCS)

Scientific classification
- Kingdom: Animalia
- Phylum: Arthropoda
- Subphylum: Chelicerata
- Class: Arachnida
- Order: Araneae
- Infraorder: Araneomorphae
- Family: Anyphaenidae
- Genus: Amaurobioides
- Species: A. pleta

Binomial name
- Amaurobioides pleta Forster, 1970

Species of spider

Amaurobioides pleta is a species of Anyphaenidae spider that is endemic to New Zealand.

== Taxonomy ==
This species was described in 1970 by Ray Forster from female and male specimens collected in Kaikoura. The holotype is stored in Otago Museum.

== Description ==
The female is recorded at 9.48mm in length whereas the male is 5.61mm. This species has a reddish brown carapace and a brown abdomen that has pale chevron markings dorsally.

== Distribution ==
This species is only known from north eastern South Island, New Zealand.

== Conservation status ==
Under the New Zealand Threat Classification System, this species is listed as "Naturally Uncommon" with the qualifiers of "Climate Impact", "Data Poor: Trend" and "Range Restricted".
