= Juno River =

- Route of the Juno River
- Mouth of the Juno River Juno River (South Island) Juno River (New Zealand)

Location
- Country: New Zealand

Physical characteristics
- Source
  - coordinates: 45°04′01″S 167°12′05″E
- Mouth
  - location: Tasman Sea
  - coordinates: 45°02′00″S 167°06′17″E

Basin features
- Progression: Juno River → Tasman Sea

The Juno River is a river of Fiordland, New Zealand. It rises west of Lake Shirley and flows westward into the Tasman Sea between Taitetimu / Caswell Sound and Taiporoporo / Charles Sound.

== See also ==
- List of rivers of New Zealand
