= Charles Sound =

Fiord of the South Island of New Zealand

- Taiporoporo (Māori)
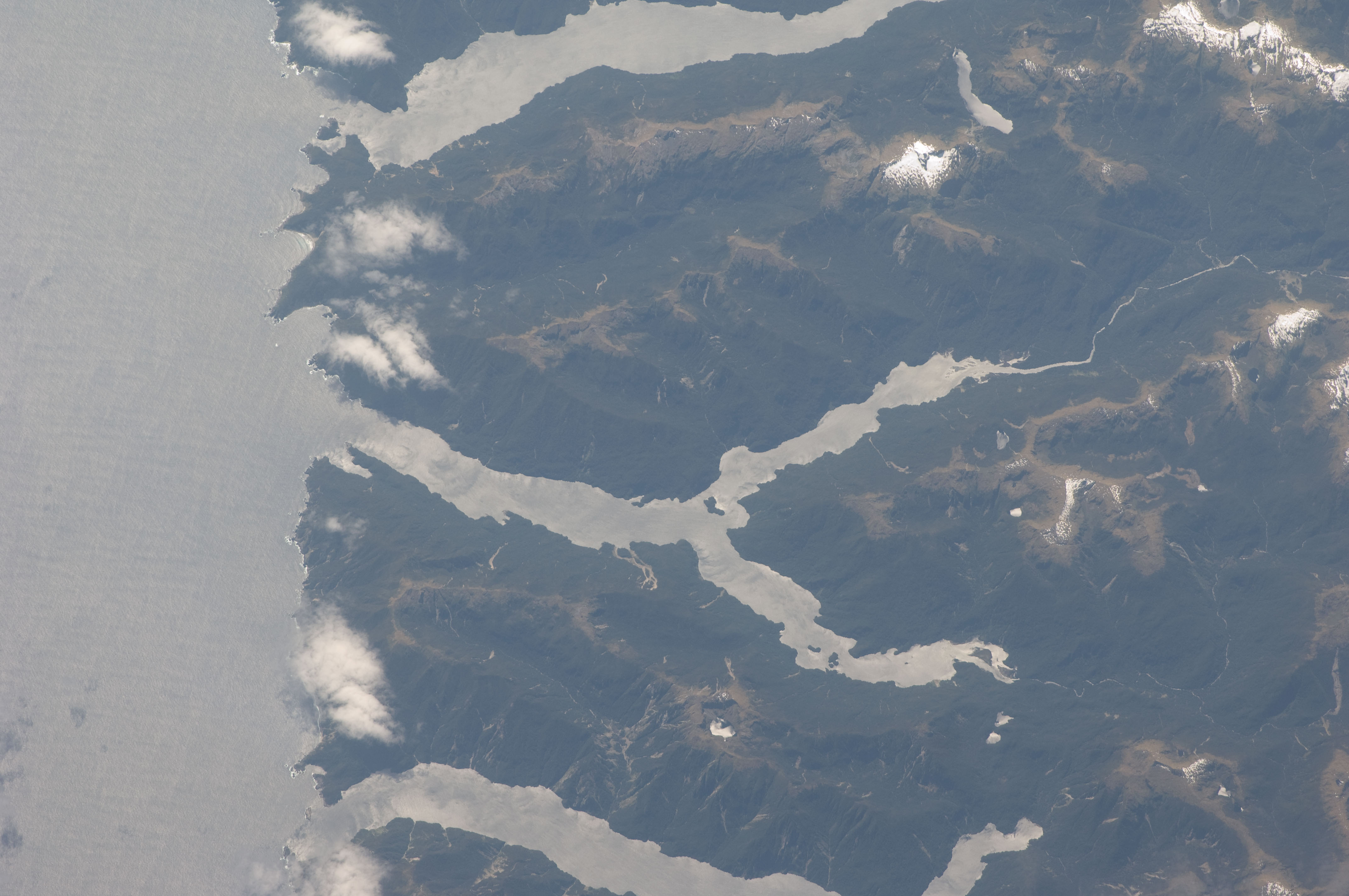
- View of Charles Sound taken from the International Space Station

- Location in New Zealand Charles Sound (New Zealand)
- Interactive map of Charles Sound
- Location: Tasman Sea
- Coordinates: 45.05°S 167.083°E
- Etymology: Named after Taiporoporo, a tūpuna (ancestor) of local Māori, and Charles McLaren, captain of a sealing boat.
- River sources: Irene River, Windward River
- Ocean/sea sources: Tasman Sea
- Catchment area: 276 square kilometres (107 sq mi)
- Basin countries: New Zealand
- Max. length: 14 kilometres (8.7 mi)
- Max. width: 1 kilometre (0.62 mi)
- Surface area: 17.4 square kilometres (6.7 sq mi)
- Max. depth: 221 metres (725 ft)

Charles Sound (Māori: Taiporoporo; officially Taiporoporo / Charles Sound) is a fiord of the South Island of New Zealand. It is one of the fiords that form the coast of Fiordland.

== Geography ==
Extending south from Milford Sound / Piopiotahi, Charles Sound is the sixth fiord in Fiordland, on the southwest coast of New Zealand's South Island, situated between Taitetimu / Caswell Sound to the north and Hinenui / Nancy Sound to the south. At a length of just under 14 kilometres (8.7 mi), it is the second shortest standalone fiord in Fiordland (after Te Rā / Dagg Sound). Despite this, Charles Sound has the deepest sill depth of the northern fiords, with a depth of 83 metres (272 ft) before deepening to a maximum depth of 221 metres (725 ft) in the main basin of the fiord. The main body of the fiord extends in a southeasterly direction from the outer Fiordland coast, before splitting into two arms of similar length in its upper reaches: the Emelius Arm (to the north) and the Gold Arm (to the south). The latter of these is protected by the Kahukura (Gold Arm) Marine Reserve. Other parts of the fiord are included in the Taumoana (Five Fingers Peninsula) Marine Reserve.

The Irene and Windward Rivers flow respectively into the ends of the Emelius and Gold Arms. The short Juno River enters to Tasman Sea just to the north of the fiord's mouth.

Several small islands are located within the fiord, in the Gold Arm these are Catherine Island, Fanny Island and Lloyd Island, and at the mouth of the Emelius Arm sits Eleanor Island.

== History ==
Charles Sound was known as Charlie's Sound during the early to mid-19th century. It was very probably named after Charles MacLaren, the captain of the Sydney Cove, a sealing boat that visited the sound in 1810.

During his hydrographic survey of the New Zealand coastline aboard HMS Acheron, Captain John Lort Stokes charted and named several geographical features within Charles Sound in Fiordland.

The sound divides into two main branches: Emelius Arm and Gold Arm. Where the fiord forks into these two arms sits Eleanor Island.

The names of these surrounding features were directly linked to Colonel Charles Emilius Gold of Wellington. Both Emelius Arm and Gold Arm were named in his honour by Captain Stokes, while Eleanor Island was named after Colonel Gold's wife, Eleanor Geddes.

In October 2019, the name of the fiord was officially altered to Taiporoporo / Charles Sound.

=== 2003 tsunami ===
During the magnitude 7.0 23 August 2003 Fiordland earthquake, a significant landslide swept into Charles Sound causing a 4- to 5-metre high tsunami that damaged a wharf and helipad in the sound.
