= Coronation Peak =

Mountain in Fiordland, New Zealand

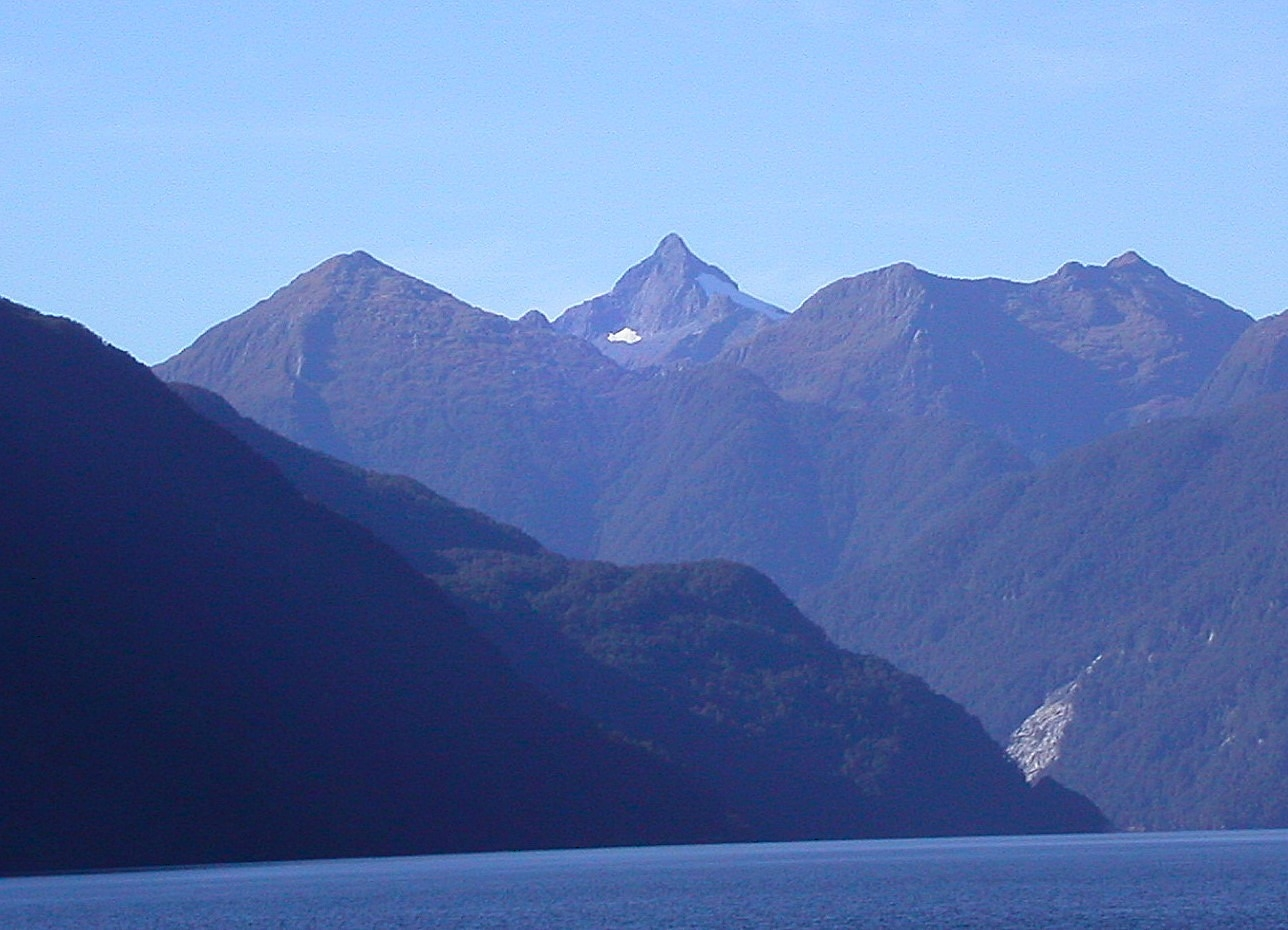
- West aspect, centred in back

Highest point
- Elevation: 1,769 m (5,804 ft)
- Prominence: 641 m (2,103 ft)
- Isolation: 8.97 km (5.57 mi)
- Coordinates: 45°13′56″S 167°16′23″E

Naming
- Etymology: Coronation of Elizabeth II

Geography
- Location within New Zealand
- Interactive map of Coronation Peak
- Location: South Island
- Country: New Zealand
- Region: Southland
- Protected area: Fiordland National Park
- Parent range: Museum Range
- Topo map: Topo50 CC06

Coronation Peak is a 1,769-metre-elevation (5,804-foot) mountain in Fiordland, New Zealand.

== Description ==
Coronation Peak is the highest point of the Museum Range. The prominent peak is located 40 kilometres (25 mi) west-northwest of the town of Te Anau in the Southland Region of the South Island, and is set within Fiordland National Park which is part of the Te Wahipounamu UNESCO World Heritage Site. Precipitation runoff from the mountain's north slope drains into the headwaters of the Irene River, whereas the west slope drains into the headwaters of the Misty River, and the other slopes drain to the Camelot River. Topographic relief is significant as the summit rises 1,200 metres (3,937 feet) above the Misty River in two kilometres. The nearest higher neighbour is Mount Irene, nine kilometres to the northeast.

== Etymology ==
The mountain was named in 1953 by the Canterbury Museum Fiordland Expedition (January–February 1953), the coronation year of Queen Elizabeth II. The peak was first sighted at close range on 15 February 1953, and the expedition party suggested that it be called Coronation Peak. The toponym has been officially approved by the New Zealand Geographic Board.

== Climate ==
Based on the Köppen climate classification, Coronation Peak is located in a marine west coast climate zone. Prevailing westerly winds blow moist air from the Tasman Sea onto the mountains, where the air is forced upward by the mountains (orographic lift), causing moisture to drop in the form of rain or snow. This climate supports a glacieret on the south slope. The months of December through February offer the most favourable weather for viewing or climbing this peak.

== Gallery ==
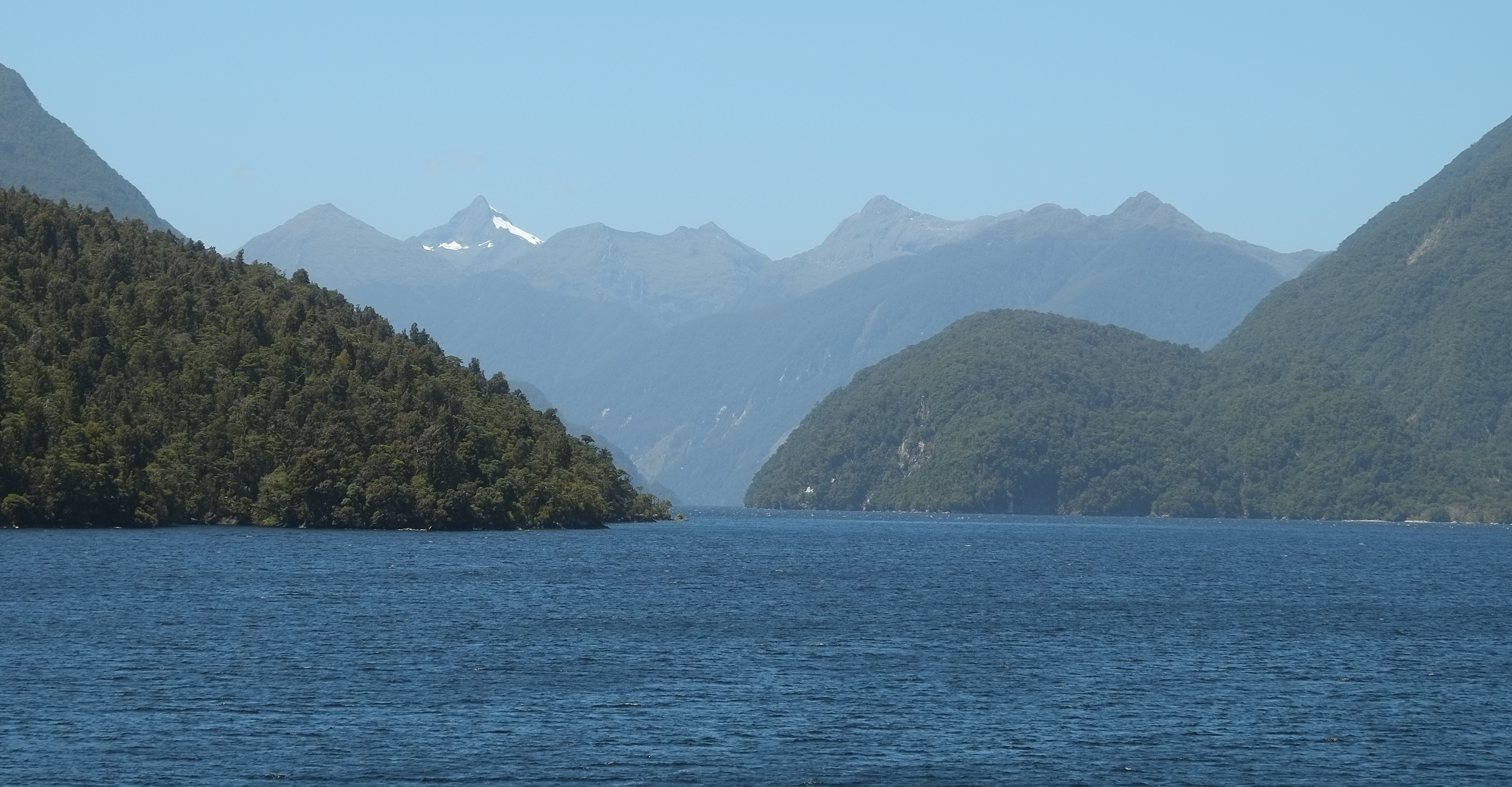
Coronation Peak with snow patches, from Bradshaw Sound

== See also ==
- List of mountains of New Zealand by height
