= Eleanor Island (New Zealand) =

Island in the Charles Sound, New Zealand

- Interactive map of Eleanor Island

Geography
- Location: Fiordland National Park
- Coordinates: 45°05′55″S 167°08′30″E
- Area: 7.5 ha (19 acres)
- Length: 500 m (1600 ft)
- Width: 200 m (700 ft)

Administration
- New Zealand
- Region: Southland

Demographics
- Population: uninhabited

Eleanor Island is an island in the Taiporoporo / Charles Sound in the South Island of New Zealand. It lies at the junction of the two main arms of the sound, Emelius Arm and Gold Arm.

The island was named by Captain John Lort Stokes.
