= Catherine Island (New Zealand) =

Island in the Charles Sound, New Zealand

- Interactive map of Catherine Island

Geography
- Location: Fiordland National Park
- Coordinates: 45°07′55″S 167°08′20″E
- Area: 2.8 ha (6.9 acres)
- Length: 200 m (700 ft)
- Width: 200 m (700 ft)

Administration
- New Zealand
- Region: Southland

Demographics
- Population: uninhabited

Catherine Island is an island in the Gold Arm of Taiporoporo / Charles Sound in the South Island of New Zealand.
