= Windward River =

Location
- Country: New Zealand
- Region: Southland,
- District: Southland

Physical characteristics
- Source: Double Peak
  - coordinates: 45°11′49″S 167°15′54″E
- Mouth: Gold Arm
  - location: Charles Sound
  - coordinates: 45°6′S 167°8′E
  - elevation: Sea Level
- Length: 16 kilometres (9.9 mi)

The Windward River is a river in Fiordland, New Zealand, flowing into Gold Arm, Charles Sound. The estuary of the Windward River is protected by the Kahukura (Gold Arm) Marine Reserve.

== See also ==
- List of rivers of New Zealand
