= Eleanor Island (Alaska) =

Island in Prince William Sound, Alaska

- Interactive map of Eleanor Island

Geography
- Location: Prince William Sound
- Coordinates: 60°32′59″N 147°34′46″W
- Length: 4 mi (6 km)

Administration
- United States
- State: Alaska
- Borough: Chugach Borough

Eleanor Island is an island in Prince William Sound, Alaska, 4 miles (6.4 km) southwest of Naked Island and 24 miles (39 km) northeast of Chenega, Alaska, Chugach Mountains.
