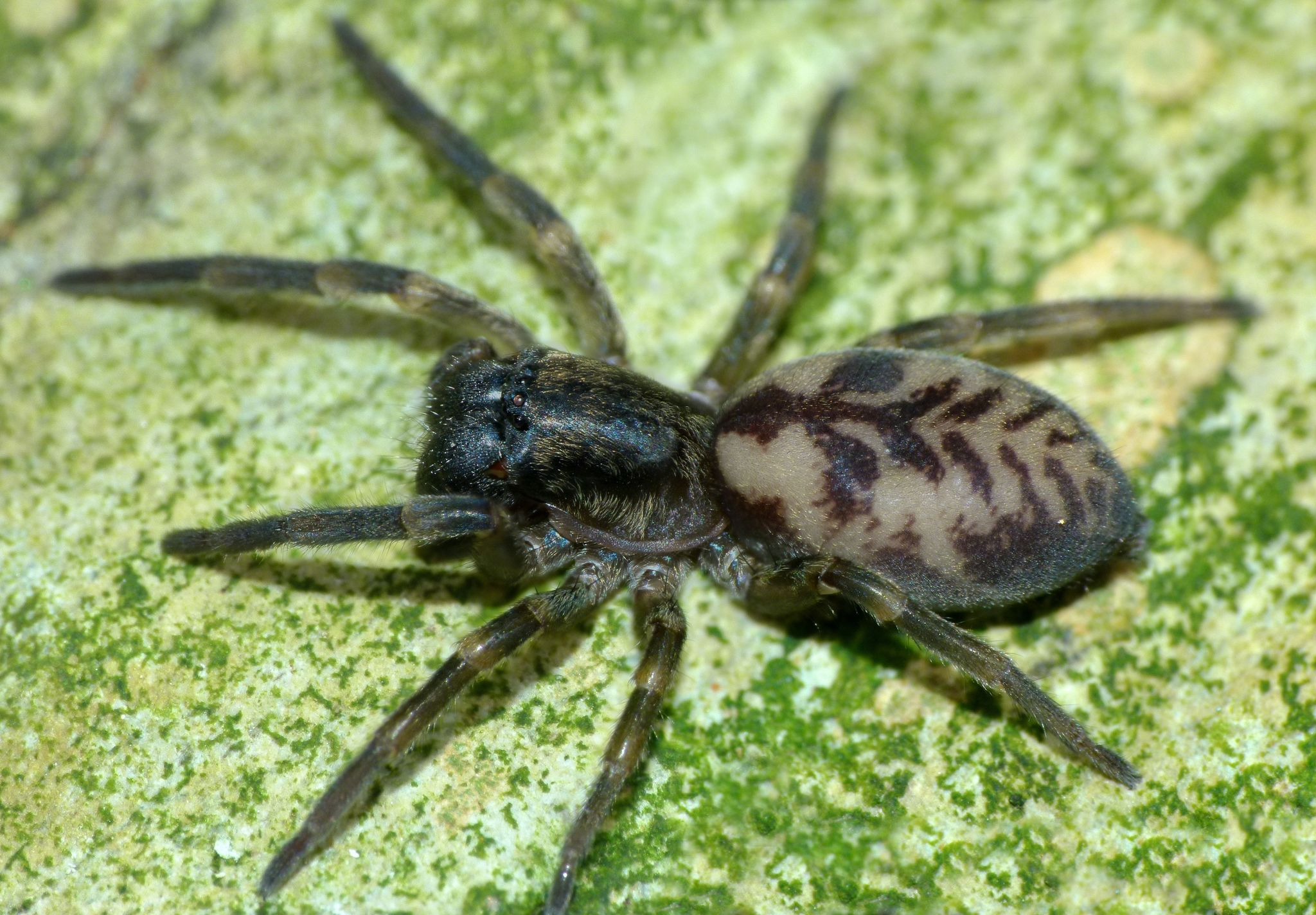

Conservation status
- Naturally Uncommon (NZ TCS)

Scientific classification
- Kingdom: Animalia
- Phylum: Arthropoda
- Subphylum: Chelicerata
- Class: Arachnida
- Order: Araneae
- Infraorder: Araneomorphae
- Family: Anyphaenidae
- Genus: Amaurobioides
- Species: A. maritima

Binomial name
- Amaurobioides maritima Pickard-Cambridge, 1883

= Amaurobioides maritima =

Species of spider

Amaurobioides maritima is a species of Anyphaenidae spider that is endemic to New Zealand.

== Taxonomy ==
This species was described in 1883 by Octavius Pickard-Cambridge from female specimens collected in Allday Bay. It was most recently revised in 1970, in which the male was described. The holotype is stored in Oxford University Museum of Natural History.

== Description ==
The female is recorded at 13.6mm in length whereas the male is 8.45mm. This species has a reddish brown carapace and a brown abdomen that has pale chevron markings dorsally.

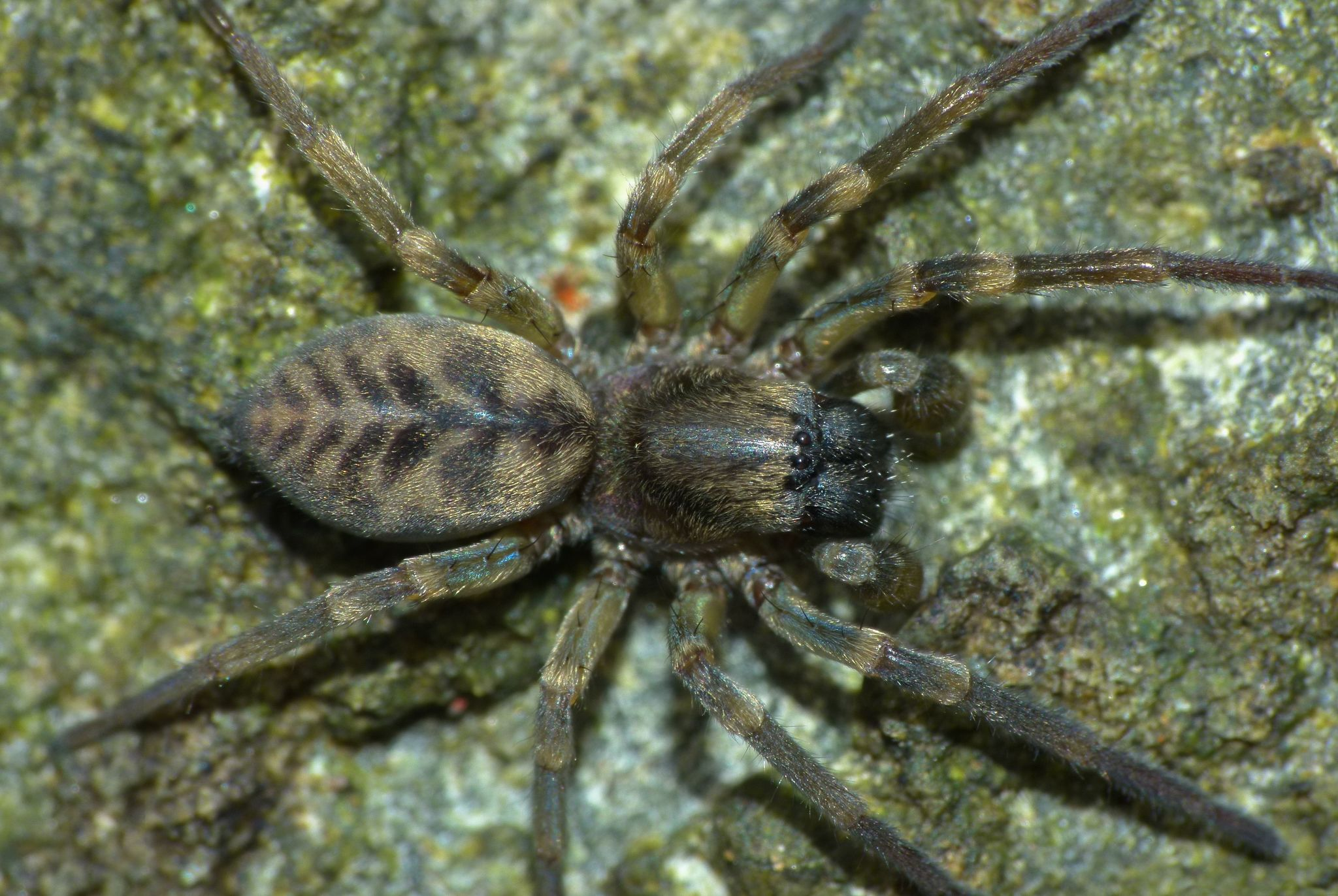

== Distribution ==
This species is only known from Otago, New Zealand.

== Conservation status ==
Under the New Zealand Threat Classification System, this species is listed as "Naturally Uncommon" with the qualifiers of "Climate Impact", "Data Poor: Trend" and "Range Restricted".
