= Caswell Sound =

Fiord of the South Island of New Zealand

Taitetimu / Caswell Sound
- Taitetimu (Māori)
- Location in New Zealand Taitetimu / Caswell Sound (New Zealand)
- Interactive map of Taitetimu / Caswell Sound
- Location: Tasman Sea
- Coordinates: 45°0′0″S 167°07′30″E
- River sources: Stillwater River
- Basin countries: New Zealand
- Max. length: 16 km (9.9 mi)
- Max. width: 1 km (0.62 mi)

Taitetimu / Caswell Sound is a fiord of the South Island of New Zealand. It is one of the fiords that form the coast of Fiordland.

== Geography ==
The fiord is located between Te Houhou / George Sound and Taiporoporo / Charles Sound, on the central Fiordland coast. It is 16 kilometres in length, and extends in a roughly west-northwestern direction. The fiord is relatively straight except near its mouth, when it turns northward, and has no major arms or indentations. A small island, Styles Island, sits close to the southern shore at the fiord's entrance to the Tasman Sea.

A straight ridge of peaks lies parallel with the fiord's south shore, between it and the valley of the Juno River. The highest point of these peaks, at 1,485 metres (4,872 ft), lies just to the west of the small mountain lake, Lake Shirley, which flows into the fiord over the Shirley Falls. Mountains also stand against the northern shore of the fiord, several of them rising above 1,200 metres (3,900 ft).

Several small rivers enter the fiord along its southern and northern shores, but the main river feeding the fiord is the Stillwater River, which flows into the fiord's eastern end. Shortly before entering the fiord it flows into the northeastern edge of Lake Marchant, exiting to the fiord at the lake's northwest. Lake Marchant is also fed by the Large Burn, which enters the lake's southern end.

== Name ==
A. W. Reed lists four plausible origins for the fiord's name in his seminal Place Names of New Zealand (1975). The most favoured of these possibilities is that it was named for Jim Caswell, a half-caste Māori or Australian Aborigine guide to an early 19th-century sealing party. Reed does, however, also detail correspondence he had received that suggested that Royal Navy Commander William Caswell was in charge of a survey of the sounds during the 1830s and that other place names in the area make his a likely origin of the name. Confusing things further is the presence of two other naval officers with the surname Caswell (George and Thomas) who had visited the area.

In October 2019, the name of the fiord was officially altered to Taitetimu / Caswell Sound.
