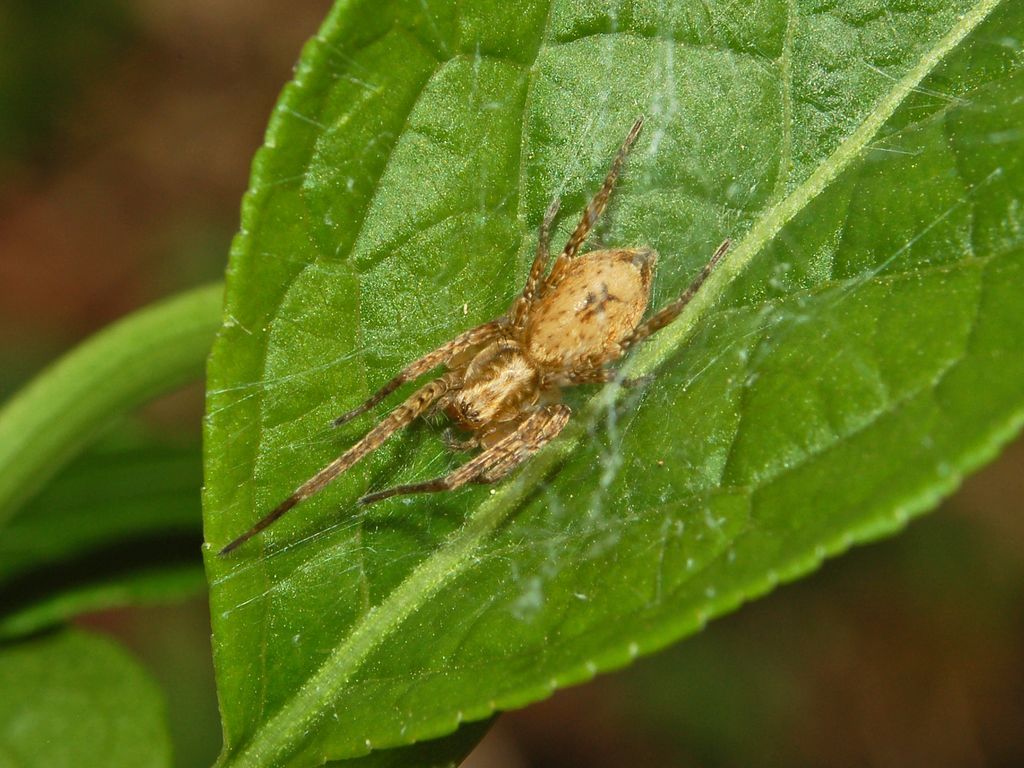
- Anyphaena sp.

Scientific classification
- Kingdom: Animalia
- Phylum: Arthropoda
- Subphylum: Chelicerata
- Class: Arachnida
- Order: Araneae
- Infraorder: Araneomorphae
- Family: Anyphaenidae
- Genus: Anyphaena; Sundevall, 1833

Type species
- A. accentuata (Walckenaer, 1802)

Species
- 111, see text

= Anyphaena =

Anyphaena Temporal range: Palaeogene–present

Genus of spiders

Anyphaena is a genus of anyphaenid sac spiders first described by Carl Jakob Sundevall in 1833.

The eye arrangement of spiders in the genus Anyphaena

They are yellow or brownish in coloration, with a concave carapace that narrows gradually towards the head.

== Species ==
As of October 2026 it contains 111 species in North America, Europe, Middle East and Southern and Eastern Asia:

- A. accentuata (Walckenaer, 1802) – Europe to Central Asia, Iran
- A. adnani Rivera-Quiroz & Álvarez-Padilla, 2023 – Mexico
- A. alachua Platnick, 1974 – USA
- A. alamos Platnick & Lau, 1975 – Mexico
- A. alboirrorata Simon, 1878 – Portugal, Spain, France
- A. andina Chamberlin, 1916 – Peru
- A. aperta (Banks, 1921) – USA, Canada
- A. arbida Platnick, 1974 – USA
- A. autumna Platnick, 1974 – USA
- A. ayshides Yaginuma, 1958 – Japan
- A. bermudensis Sierwald, 1988 – Bermuda
- A. bifurcata Rivera-Quiroz & Álvarez-Padilla, 2023 – Mexico
- A. bispinosa Bryant, 1940 – Cuba
- A. brescoviti García-García, 2026 – Mexico
- A. bromelicola Platnick, 1977 – Mexico
- A. bryantae Roewer, 1951 – Cuba
- A. californica (Banks, 1904) – USA
- A. catalina Platnick, 1974 – USA, Mexico
- A. celer (Hentz, 1847) – USA, Canada
- A. cielo Platnick & Lau, 1975 – Mexico
- A. cochise Platnick, 1974 – USA
- A. cortes Platnick & Lau, 1975 – Mexico
- A. crebrispina Chamberlin, 1919 – USA
- A. cumbre Platnick & Lau, 1975 – Mexico
- A. darlingtoni Bryant, 1940 – Cuba
- A. decora Bryant, 1942 – Puerto Rico
- A. diversa Bryant, 1936 – Cuba
- A. dixiana (Chamberlin & Woodbury, 1929) – USA
- A. dominicana Roewer, 1951 – Hispaniola
- A. dulceae Rivera-Quiroz & Álvarez-Padilla, 2023 – Mexico
- A. encino Platnick & Lau, 1975 – Mexico
- A. epicardia Rivera-Quiroz & Álvarez-Padilla, 2023 – Mexico
- A. estriada García-García, 2026 – Mexico
- A. felipe Platnick & Lau, 1975 – Mexico
- A. fernandae Rivera-Quiroz & Álvarez-Padilla, 2023 – Mexico
- A. franciscoi Rivera-Quiroz & Álvarez-Padilla, 2023 – Mexico
- A. fraterna (Banks, 1896) – USA
- A. furcatella Banks, 1914 – Costa Rica
- A. furva Miller, 1967 – France, Germany, Czech Republic, Slovakia
- A. gertschi Platnick, 1974 – USA
- A. gibba O. Pickard-Cambridge, 1896 – Mexico
- A. gibboides Platnick, 1974 – USA
- A. gibbosa O. Pickard-Cambridge, 1896 – Mexico
- A. grovyle Lin & Li, 2021 — Hainan
- A. hespar Platnick, 1974 – USA, Mexico
- A. ibarrai Rivera-Quiroz & Álvarez-Padilla, 2023 – Mexico
- A. inferens Chamberlin, 1925 – Costa Rica, Panama
- A. jimenzae Rivera-Quiroz & Álvarez-Padilla, 2023 – Mexico
- A. judicata O. Pickard-Cambridge, 1896 – USA to Guatemala
- A. kurilensis Peelle & Saito, 1932 – Kuril Islands
- A. lacka Platnick, 1974 – USA
- A. leechi Platnick, 1977 – Mexico
- A. leidashi Yao & Liu, 2024 – China
- A. maculata (Banks, 1896) – USA
- A. marginalis (Banks, 1901) – USA, Mexico
- A. martinezae García-García, 2026 – Mexico
- A. mateoi García-García, 2026 – Mexico
- A. megamedia Rivera-Quiroz & Álvarez-Padilla, 2023 – Mexico
- A. miniducta Rivera-Quiroz & Álvarez-Padilla, 2023 – Mexico
- A. modesta Bryant, 1948 – Hispaniola
- A. mogan Song & Chen, 1987 – China
- A. monserratae García-García, 2026 – Mexico
- A. morelia Platnick & Lau, 1975 – Mexico
- A. natachae Rivera-Quiroz & Álvarez-Padilla, 2023 – Mexico
- A. nexuosa Chickering, 1940 – Panama
- A. noctua Rivera-Quiroz & Álvarez-Padilla, 2023 – Mexico
- A. numida Simon, 1897 – Algeria, Portugal, Spain, France, Britain
- A. obregon Platnick & Lau, 1975 – Mexico
- A. otinapa Platnick & Lau, 1975 – Mexico
- A. pacifica (Banks, 1896) – USA, Canada
- A. pectorosa L. Koch, 1866 – USA, Canada
- A. plana F. O. Pickard-Cambridge, 1900 – Panama
- A. platnicki García-García, 2026 – Cuba
- A. pontica Weiss, 1988 – Romania, Turkey
- A. porta Rivera-Quiroz & Álvarez-Padilla, 2023 – Mexico
- A. pretiosa Banks, 1914 – Costa Rica
- A. proba O. Pickard-Cambridge, 1896 – Mexico
- A. pugil Karsch, 1879 – Sakhalin, Kuril Islands, Korea, Japan
- A. pusilla Bryant, 1948 – Hispaniola
- A. quadrata Rivera-Quiroz & Álvarez-Padilla, 2023 – Mexico
- A. quadricornuta Kraus, 1955 – El Salvador
- A. rebecae Rivera-Quiroz & Álvarez-Padilla, 2023 – Mexico
- A. reynae García-García, 2026 – Mexico
- A. rita Platnick, 1974 – USA, Mexico
- A. sabina L. Koch, 1866 – Europe, Turkey, Caucasus
- A. salgueiroi Rivera-Quiroz & Álvarez-Padilla, 2023 – Mexico
- A. salto Platnick & Lau, 1975 – Mexico
- A. sceptile Lin & Li, 2021 — Hainan
- A. scopulata F. O. Pickard-Cambridge, 1900 – Guatemala
- A. shenzhen Lin & Li, 2021 — China
- A. simoni Becker, 1878 – Mexico
- A. simplex O. Pickard-Cambridge, 1894 – Mexico, Costa Rica
- A. sofiae Rivera-Quiroz & Álvarez-Padilla, 2023 – Mexico
- A. soricina Simon, 1889 – India
- A. stigma Rivera-Quiroz & Álvarez-Padilla, 2023 – Mexico
- A. subgibba O. Pickard-Cambridge, 1896 – Guatemala
- A. sundevalli García-García, 2026 – Mexico
- A. syriaca Kulczyński, 1911 – Lebanon, Israel
- A. taiwanensis Chen & Huang, 2011 – Taiwan
- A. tancitaro Platnick & Lau, 1975 – Mexico
- A. tehuacan Platnick & Lau, 1975 – Mexico
- A. tonoi Rivera-Quiroz & Álvarez-Padilla, 2023 – Mexico
- A. triangularis Rivera-Quiroz & Álvarez-Padilla, 2023 – Mexico
- A. tibet Lin & Li, 2021 — China
- A. treecko Lin & Li, 2021 — Hainan
- A. trifida F. O. Pickard-Cambridge, 1900 – Mexico, Guatemala
- A. tuberosa F. O. Pickard-Cambridge, 1900 – Guatemala
- A. urieli Rivera-Quiroz & Álvarez-Padilla, 2023 – Mexico
- A. wanlessi Platnick & Lau, 1975 – Mexico
- A. xochimilco Platnick & Lau, 1975 – Mexico
- A. yoshitakei Baba & Tanikawa, 2017 – Japan
- A. zorynae Durán-Barrón, Pérez & Brescovit, 2016 – Mexico
- A. zuyelenae Durán-Barrón, Pérez & Brescovit, 2016 – Mexico
