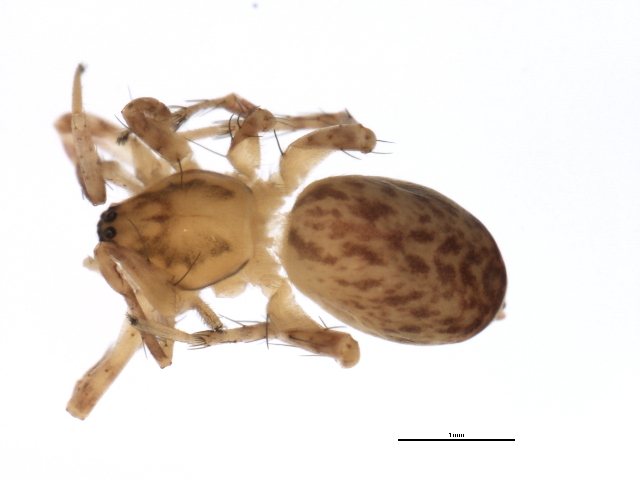
- A. pacifica, immature

Conservation status
- Secure (NatureServe)

Scientific classification
- Kingdom: Animalia
- Phylum: Arthropoda
- Subphylum: Chelicerata
- Class: Arachnida
- Order: Araneae
- Infraorder: Araneomorphae
- Family: Anyphaenidae
- Genus: Anyphaena
- Species: A. pacifica

Binomial name
- Anyphaena pacifica (Banks, 1896)

= Anyphaena pacifica =

Species of spider

Anyphaena pacifica is a species of ghost spider in the family Anyphaenidae. It is found in the United States and Canada.
