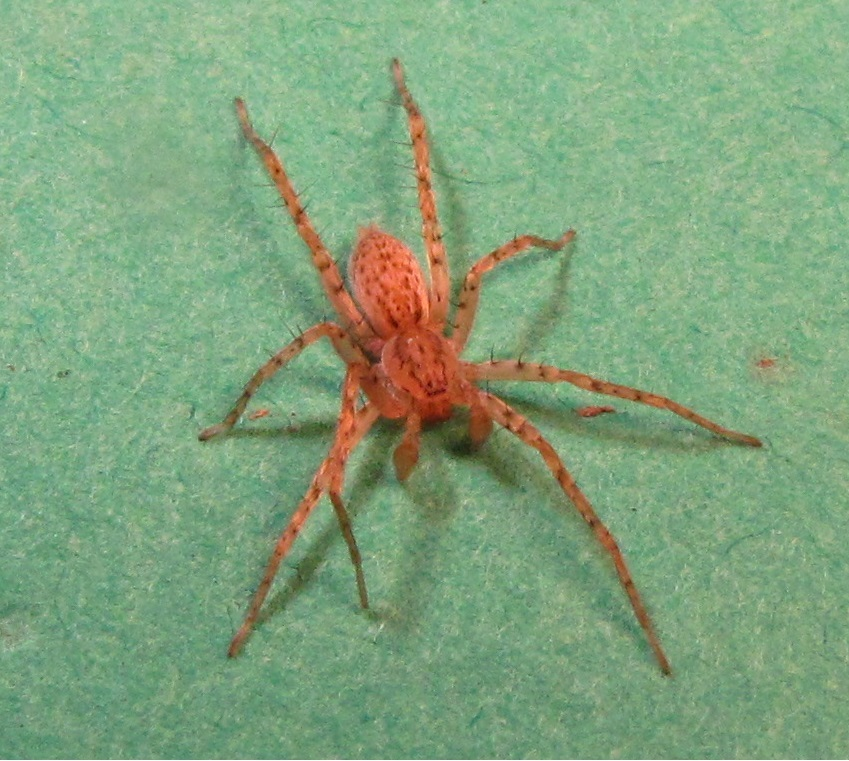
- Charlotte County, North Carolina, 2018

Scientific classification
- Domain: Eukaryota
- Kingdom: Animalia
- Phylum: Arthropoda
- Subphylum: Chelicerata
- Class: Arachnida
- Order: Araneae
- Infraorder: Araneomorphae
- Family: Anyphaenidae
- Genus: Anyphaena
- Species: A. fraterna

Binomial name
- Anyphaena fraterna (Banks, 1896)

= Anyphaena fraterna =

Species of spider

Anyphaena fraterna is a species of ghost spider in the family Anyphaenidae. It is found in the USA.
