= Anyphaena treecko =

Scientific classification
- Kingdom: Animalia
- Phylum: Arthropoda
- Subphylum: Chelicerata
- Class: Arachnida
- Order: Araneae
- Infraorder: Araneomorphae
- Family: Anyphaenidae
- Genus: Anyphaena
- Species: A. treecko

Binomial name
- Anyphaena treecko Lin & Li, 2021

Synonyms
- Rathalos treecko (Lin & Li, 2021)

Species of spider

Anyphaena treecko is a species of ghost spider found in China.

== Etymology ==
The species is named after Treecko, a fictional character from the Pokémon franchise of video games.

== Taxonomy and systematics ==
The male of A. treecko is similar to A. xiushanensis in having a similarly shaped median apophysis, conductor, and retrolateral tibial apophysis, but can be distinguished by the retrolateral tibial apophysis, which narrows toward the terminus and has an obvious bifurcation, and by the well-developed, triangular cymbial apophysis. Females are similar to A. xiushanensis in the shape of the epigyne, but in A. treecko the epigyne is anteriorly narrow and flat and the copulatory ducts are narrow.

== Description ==
The male holotype has a total length of 5.26 mm. The carapace is 2.12 mm long and 1.31 mm wide, pale yellow. The opisthosoma is 3.14 mm long and 1.42 mm wide, pale yellow. The legs are yellow and covered with many setae. Leg formula is 1432. The palp has a well-developed ventral tibial basal apophysis. The retrolateral tibial apophysis is bifurcated. The cymbial apophysis is triangular. The sperm duct lacks spirals. The median apophysis is irregular polygon-shaped with a flat terminus bearing a hook. The conductor is arc-shaped distally and cone-shaped mesally. The embolus is filamentous.

The female paratype has a total length of 6.82 mm. The carapace is 2.21 mm long and 1.91 mm wide, pale yellow. The opisthosoma is 4.61 mm long and 2.53 mm wide. Leg formula is 1423. The epigyne is longer than wide and triangular. The copulatory openings are inconspicuous. The copulatory ducts are almost straight. The accessory glands are distinct and located at the middle of the copulatory ducts. The spermathecae are inconspicuous and oval.

== Distribution and habitat ==
The species is known only from the type locality: Dongsizhan, Bawangling, Changjiang County, Hainan, China.
