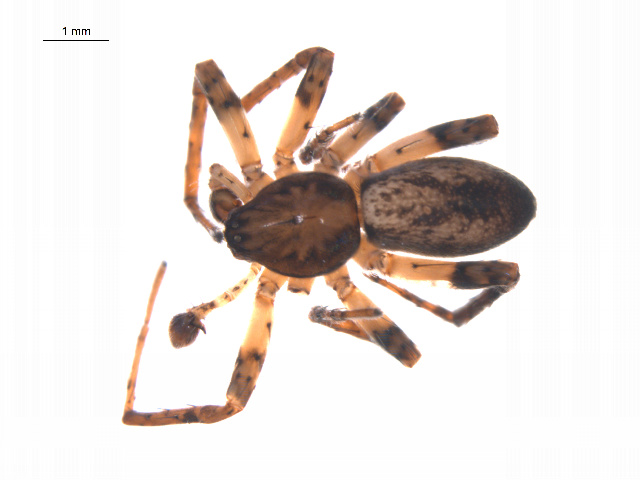
- A. aperta, adult male
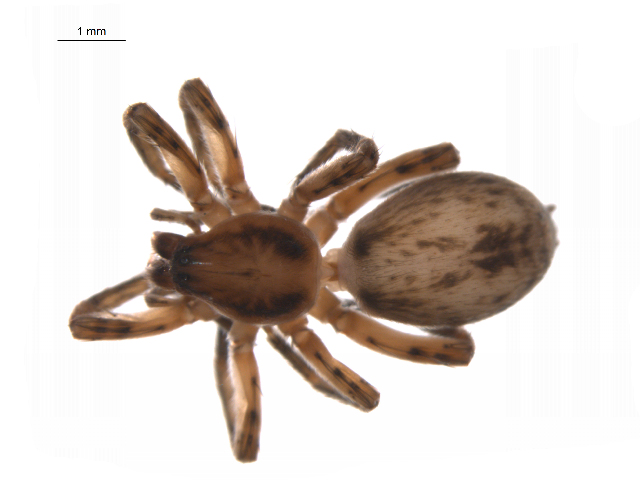
- A. aperta, adult female

Scientific classification
- Domain: Eukaryota
- Kingdom: Animalia
- Phylum: Arthropoda
- Subphylum: Chelicerata
- Class: Arachnida
- Order: Araneae
- Infraorder: Araneomorphae
- Family: Anyphaenidae
- Genus: Anyphaena
- Species: A. aperta

Binomial name
- Anyphaena aperta (Banks, 1921)

= Anyphaena aperta =

Species of spider

Anyphaena aperta is a species of ghost spider in the family Anyphaenidae. It is found in the United States and Canada. It has adapted to the presence of Australian tea tree plants as an invasive species in North America, using said plants as habitat.
