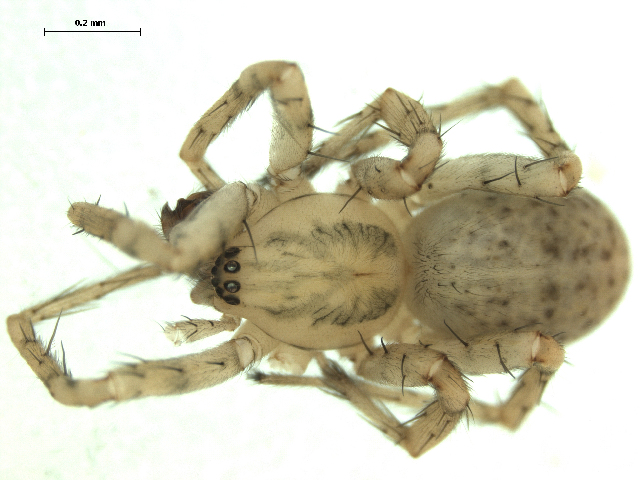
- A. celer, adult female

Scientific classification
- Domain: Eukaryota
- Kingdom: Animalia
- Phylum: Arthropoda
- Subphylum: Chelicerata
- Class: Arachnida
- Order: Araneae
- Infraorder: Araneomorphae
- Family: Anyphaenidae
- Genus: Anyphaena
- Species: A. celer

Binomial name
- Anyphaena celer (Hentz, 1847)

= Anyphaena celer =

Species of spider

Anyphaena celer is a species of ghost spider in the family Anyphaenidae. It is found in the United States and Canada.
