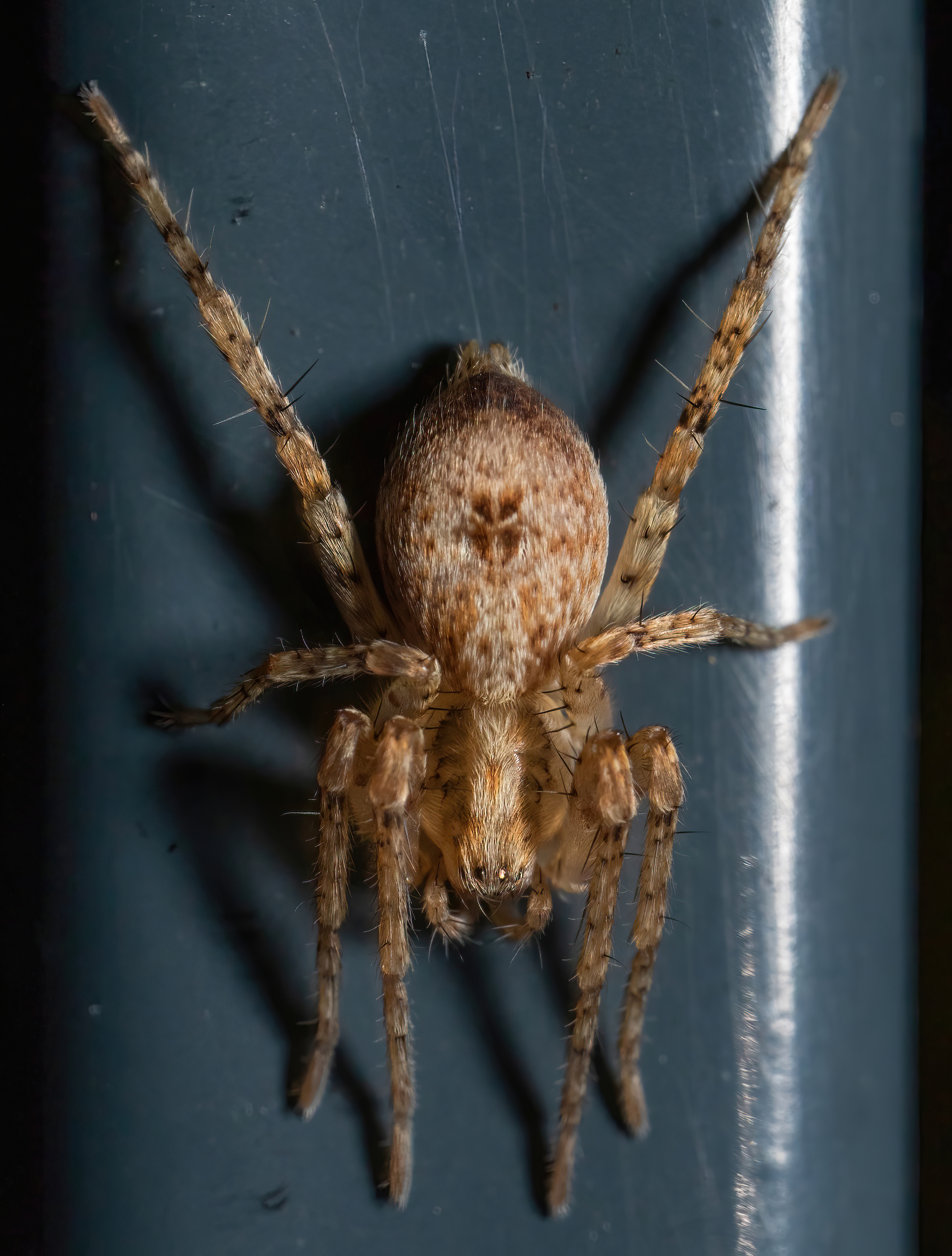

Scientific classification
- Kingdom: Animalia
- Phylum: Arthropoda
- Subphylum: Chelicerata
- Class: Arachnida
- Order: Araneae
- Infraorder: Araneomorphae
- Family: Anyphaenidae
- Genus: Anyphaena
- Species: A. accentuata

Binomial name
- Anyphaena accentuata (Walckenaer, 1802)

= Anyphaena accentuata =

Species of spider

Anyphaena accentuata is a species of spider in the Order Araneae.

== Description ==
The female specimens have a body length that range between 5 and 9 mm, the male specimens are between 4 and 7 mm.

== Range ==
The range spreads from Europe to Central Asia.

== Habitat ==
The species lives in trees, conifers and shrubs. During the day they hide in their woven tubes. During the night they hunt. They can also be found in houses and apartments.

A study conducted in lowland forests in the Czech Republic found that A. accentuata often overwinter in bird nesting boxes. They remain active and, unlike other species, do not build web nests. During warmer seasons, they dwell in bark and tree trunks.

== Gallery ==
Anyphaena accentuata female

Anyphaena accentuata male

Anyphaena accentuata young male with larva of cardinal beetle Schizotus pectinicornis

Anyphaena accentuata male

Anyphaena accentuata male

Anyphaena accentuata male
