= Awaroa =

Awaroa may refer to the following in New Zealand:

- Awaroa, the Māori name for Godley Head in Christchurch
- Awaroa Inlet, an inlet in Abel Tasman National Park
- Awaroa River (disambiguation), various rivers
