= Awapoto River =

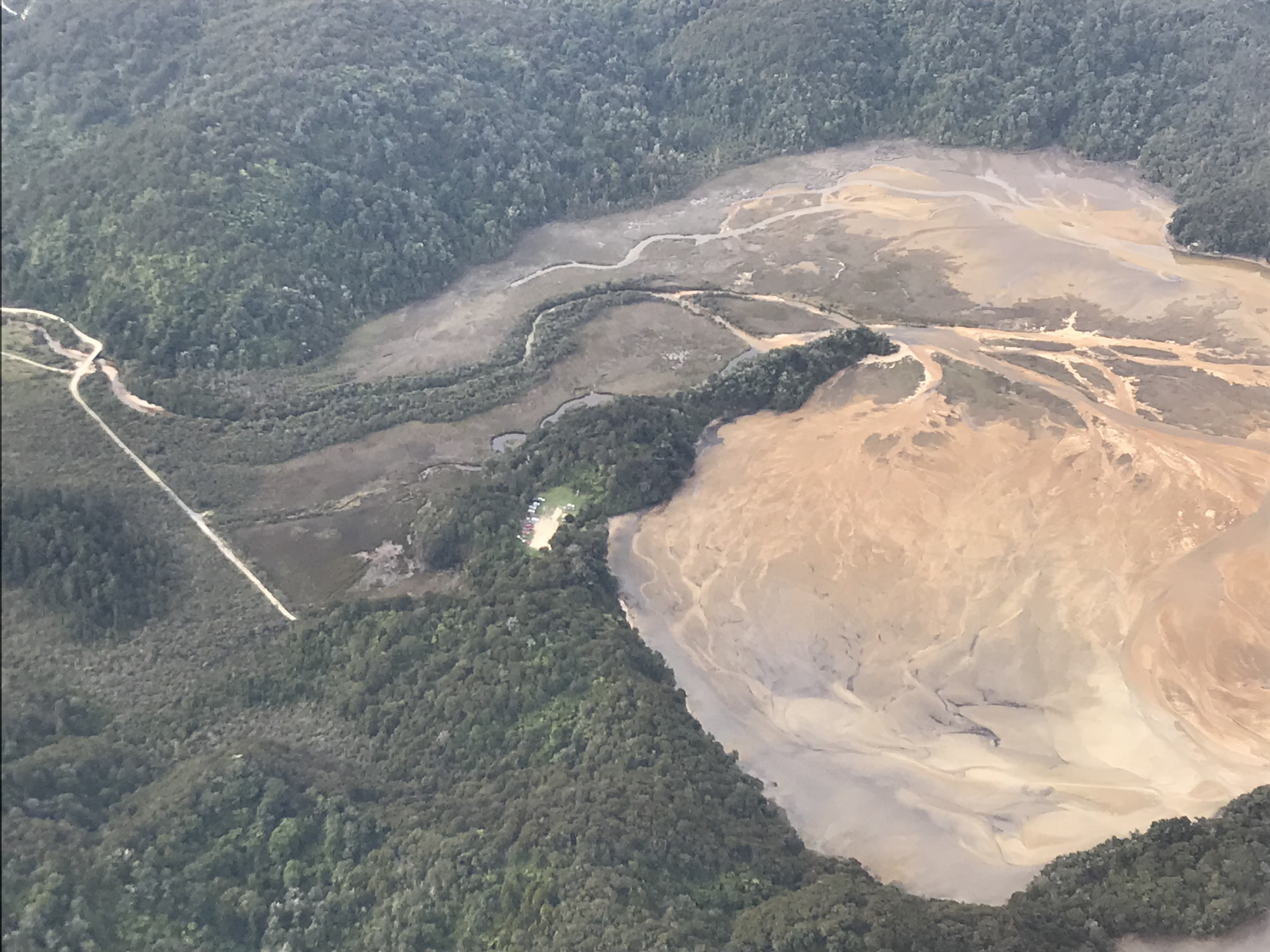
- Awapoto River (left) flowing into the Awaroa Inlet; Awaroa Road (far left) is also visible
- Route of the Awapoto River
- Mouth of the Awapoto River Awapoto River (South Island)

Location
- Country: New Zealand

Physical characteristics
- Source
  - location: Evans Ridge
  - coordinates: 40°54′11″S 172°56′02″E
  - elevation: 975 metres (3,199 ft)
- Mouth
  - location: Awaroa Inlet
  - coordinates: 40°51′32″S 172°59′49″E
  - elevation: 0 metres (0 ft)

Basin features
- Progression: Awapoto River → Awaroa Inlet → Awaroa Bay → Tasman Sea

The Awapoto River, also known as Little River as a literal translation from Māori, is a river in the Tasman District of New Zealand. It rises east of Evans Ridge. There are no named peaks near the source, but the Abel Tasman Inland Track follows Evans Ridge near the river's source. The Awapoto River initially flows north-east and then east through the Abel Tasman National Park. It flows through Hadfield Clearing and then passes under Awaroa Road before entering the Awaroa Inlet.

What became known as Hadfield Clearing is part of the 1,000 acres (400 ha) of land purchased by Frederick Hadfield in 1863; the river flows through this land. Together with William Lightband, he had also leased 2,000 acres (810 ha) north of Abel Head, on the south side of Awaroa Inlet, from the previous year. Two of Frederick Hadfield's sons would take up farming in this area: William Hadfield (1844–1920) farmed along the Awapoto River; and Harry Hadfield (1847–1913) farmed along the Awaroa River that flows into the southern reaches of Awaroa Inlet. William Hadfield had a modest homestead on his land and raised a family of two girls and seven boys. One of his sons was Darcy Hadfield, the winner of New Zealand's first Olympic medal in rowing (in the single sculls in 1920).

Hadfield Clearing was farmed by the family until 2004, when Bill Hadfield died. In November 2006, the descendants sold the land—by now 790 hectares (2,000 acres)—to the Department of Conservation; it was the last significant block of land to be incorporated into Abel Tasman National Park.

Since 2017, the Department of Conservation and Project Janszoon have released just under 300 brown teal in the Awapoto River. The birds are successfully breeding in that location. Fiordland's Arthur Valley is the only other mainland site in the South Island where brown teal live in the wild.
