= Rowing at the 1920 Summer Olympics – Men's single sculls =

Olympic rowing event

Men's single sculls at the Games of the VII Olympiad
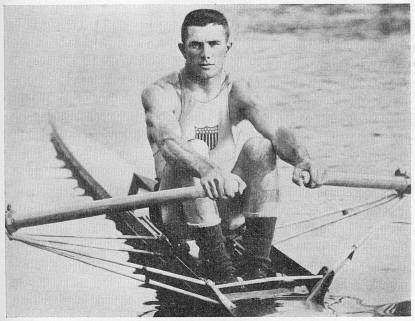
- Gold medalist Jack Kelly
- Venue: Brussels–Scheldt Maritime Canal
- Dates: 27–29 August 1920
- Competitors: 10 from 10 nations
- Winning time: 7:35.0

Medalists
1st place, gold medalist(s)		John B. Kelly Sr. United States
2nd place, silver medalist(s)		Jack Beresford; Great Britain
3rd place, bronze medalist(s)		Darcy Hadfield; New Zealand

The men's single sculls event was part of the rowing programme at the 1920 Summer Olympics. The competition, the fifth appearance of the event, was held from 27 to 29 August 1920. Ten rowers, each from a different nation, competed. The event was won by John B. Kelly Sr. of the United States, the nation's second victory in the event (tying Great Britain for most among nations at the time). It was the first of Kelly's three Olympic gold medals; he would also win in the double sculls about an hour later (a double that has never been repeated) as well as in the 1924 double sculls. In the final, Kelly defeated Great Britain's Jack Beresford in "of the greatest sculling races ever contested." Beresford led most of the way, with Kelly passing him late and winning by one second—a very close race in single sculls. The final held particular significance to Kelly, who had only decided to participate in the Olympics after being excluded from the 1920 Diamond Challenge Sculls; Kelly had wanted "to get a crack at the man who wins the diamond sculls"—which had turned out to be Beresford.

Darcy Hadfield took bronze, the first Olympic medal for New Zealand as a separate nation (New Zealand had previously competed with Australia as "Australasia" in 1908 and 1912).

== Background ==
This was the fifth appearance of the event. Rowing had been on the programme in 1896 but was cancelled due to bad weather. The single sculls has been held every time that rowing has been contested, beginning in 1900.

The competition featured a historically great field. John B. Kelly Sr. and Jack Beresford are cited as the best scullers to have ever come from the United States and Great Britain, respectively. Kelly had won six national championships and put together a 126-race winning streak in 1919 and 1920. Beresford had won the 1920 Diamond Challenge Sculls in 1920 and would win the Wingfield Sculls seven consecutive times, as well as winning five Olympic medals at five different Games (and in four different rowing events). Kelly had been excluded from the Diamond Challenge Sculls in 1920, primarily due to a ban on the Vesper Boat Club to which he belonged, though his work as a bricklayer was also cited as a violation of amateurism rules. Other prominent scullers competing in Antwerp included 1920 European champion Max Schmid of Switzerland and 1919 Inter-Allied champion Darcy Hadfield of New Zealand.

Czechoslovakia, the Netherlands, New Zealand, Sweden, and Switzerland each made their debut in the event. Great Britain made its fourth appearance, most among nations, having missed only the 1904 Games in St. Louis.

== Competition format ==
The competition featured three rounds (quarterfinals, semifinals, and a final), with more than two boats to a race for the first time since 1904. The quarterfinals consisted of four heats of either two or three boats each, with the top sculler in each heat advancing. The four quarterfinal winners were separated into two semifinals of two boats each; the winner of each advanced to the final. There was no bronze medal race, but only one of the semifinal losers received bronze. The course used the 2000 metres distance that became the Olympic standard in 1912.

== Schedule ==
Date	Time	Round
Friday, 27 August 1920	14:00	Quarterfinals
Saturday, 28 August 1920	15:15	Semifinals
Sunday, 29 August 1920	15:30	Final

== Results ==
=== Quarterfinals ===
==== Quarterfinal 1 ====
Rank	Rower	Nation	Time	Notes
1	Jack Beresford	Great Britain	7:45.0	Q
2	Max Schmid	Switzerland	7:49.0	
3	Gustav Zinke	Czechoslovakia	Unknown	

==== Quarterfinal 2 ====
Rank	Rower	Nation	Time	Notes
1	Frits Eijken	Netherlands	7:50.0	Q
2	Nino Castelli	Italy	7:59.0	
3	Jacques Haller	Belgium	Unknown	

==== Quarterfinal 3 ====
Rank	Rower	Nation	Time	Notes
1	John B. Kelly Sr.	United States	7:44.2	Q
2	Nils Ljunglöf	Sweden	7:49.6	

==== Quarterfinal 4 ====
Rank	Rower	Nation	Time	Notes
1	Darcy Hadfield	New Zealand	8:05.0	Q
2	Theodor Eyrich	Denmark	8:11.0	

=== Semifinals ===
==== Semifinal 1 ====
Rank	Rower	Nation	Time	Notes
1	Jack Beresford	Great Britain	7:45.0	Q
2	Frits Eijken	Netherlands	7:50.4	

==== Semifinal 2 ====
Rank	Rower	Nation	Time	Notes
1	John B. Kelly Sr.	United States	7:46.2	Q
3rd place, bronze medalist(s)	Darcy Hadfield	New Zealand	7:49.2	

=== Final ===
Rank	Rower	Nation	Time
1st place, gold medalist(s)	John B. Kelly Sr.	United States	7:35.0
2nd place, silver medalist(s)	Jack Beresford	Great Britain	7:36.0

== Results summary ==
Rank	Rower	Nation	Quarterfinals	Semifinals	Final
1st place, gold medalist(s)	John B. Kelly Sr.	United States	7:44.2	7:46.2	7:35.0
2nd place, silver medalist(s)	Jack Beresford	Great Britain	7:45.0	7:45.0	7:36.0
3rd place, bronze medalist(s)	Darcy Hadfield	New Zealand	8:05.0	7:49.2	Did not advance
4	Frits Eijken	Netherlands	7:50.0	7:50.4	Did not advance
5	Max Schmid	Switzerland	7:49.0	Did not advance	
6	Nils Ljunglöf	Sweden	7:49.6	Did not advance	
7	Nino Castelli	Italy	7:59.0	Did not advance	
8	Theodor Eyrich	Denmark	8:11.0	Did not advance	
9	Gustav Zinke	Czechoslovakia	Unknown	Did not advance	
9	Jacques Haller	Belgium	Unknown	Did not advance	

== Sources ==
- Belgium Olympic Committee (1957). Olympic Games Antwerp 1920: Official Report (in French).
- Wudarski, Pawel (1999). "Wyniki Igrzysk Olimpijskich" (in Polish).
