= Eyrich =

Eyrich is a surname. Notable people with the surname include:

- George Eyrich (1925–2006), American Major League Baseball player
- Lou Eyrich, American fashion designer
- Theodor Eyrich (1893–1979), Danish rower
