= Awaroa River (Tasman) =

River in New Zealand

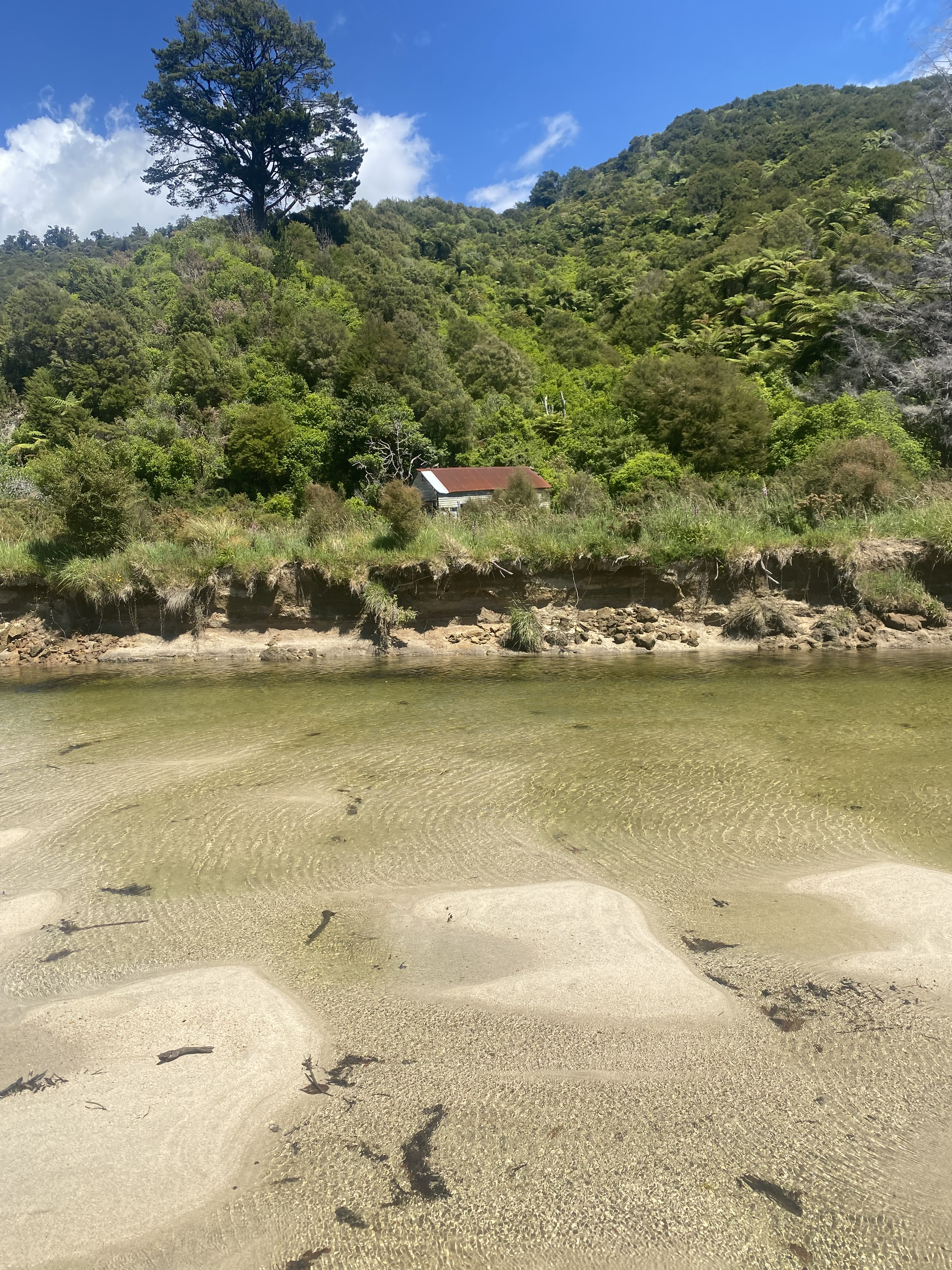
- view across the river near its mouth
- Route of the Awaroa River
- Location within New Zealand Location within South Island

Physical characteristics
- Source
  - location: Confluence of Evans Creek and an unnamed stream
  - coordinates: 40°55′04″S 172°59′02″E
- Mouth
  - location: Awaroa Inlet
  - coordinates: 40°52′19″S 172°59′46″E
  - elevation: 0 metres (0 ft)

Basin features
- Progression: Awaroa River → Awaroa Inlet → Awaroa Bay → Tasman Sea
- Tributaries
  - left: Table Creek, Kurī Creek, Camp Creek, Waterfall Creek
  - right: Long Branch Creek

Awaroa River is a river in Abel Tasman National Park in Tasman District, New Zealand.

The Awaroa River originates at the confluence of Evans Creek with an unnamed creek. The nearest named feature is Glennie Clearing. It flows into Awaroa Inlet.

== See also ==
- Awapoto River
