= Adele Island =

Adele Island may refer to:

- Adele Island (New Zealand), off the northern coast of the South Island of New Zealand
- Adele Island (Western Australia), off the Kimberley coast of Western Australia
