= Gustav Zinke =

German-Czech rower

Personal information
- Nationality: German-Czech
- Citizenship: Czechoslovakia
- Born: Gustav Philip Zinke; 1 April 1891 Roudnice nad Labem, Bohemia, Austria-Hungary
- Died: 11 November 1967 (aged 76) Ústí nad Labem, Czechoslovakia
Medal record
Men's rowing
Representing Czechoslovakia
European Rowing Championships
Bronze medal – third place	1923 Como	Men's single sculls
Bronze medal – third place	1924 Zurich	Men's single sculls

Gustav Philip Zinke (1 April 1891 – 11 November 1967) was a German-Czech rower who represented Czechoslovakia at the 1920 Summer Olympics.

Zinke's father was Prater Zinke, who was a pharmacist and had been a mayor of Roudnice nad Labem for nearly thirty years, he also had been a pioneer in sports in the area, not only would Gustav follow in his father's footsteps and become a pharmacist, he would also become an all round sportsman.

After 1918 Zinke went on to become the Czechoslovak rowing champion five times and was selected for the single sculls at the 1920 Summer Olympics being held in Antwerp, in his first round heat he finished in third place behind Jack Beresford from Great Britain, who went on to win the silver medal and the Swiss rower Max Schmid, so he didn't advance any further.

Zinke went on to compete three times at the European Rowing Championships and twice returned home with bronze medals in 1923 in Como and one year later in Zurich.

After retiring from racing, he kept active within the Czech Athletic Club and the Czech Rowing Union, as well as commuting for his normal job, which he was doing when he was 76 years old, he fell under the wheels of a passing train. He died on 11 November 1967.
