= Darcy Hadfield =

New Zealand rower

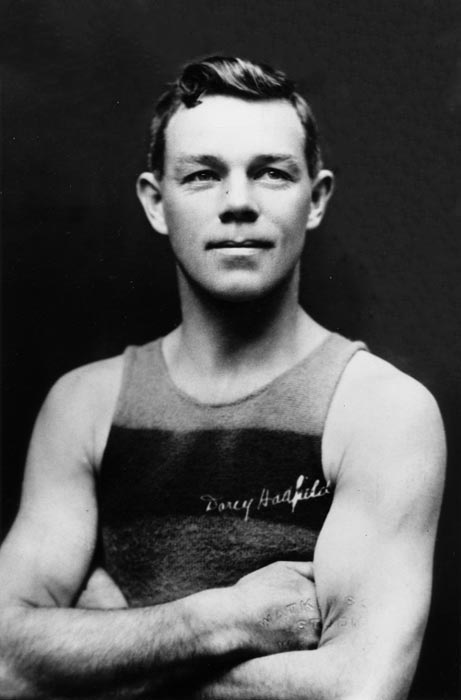
- Darcy Hadfield in 1922

Personal information
- Nationality: New Zealand
- Born: 1 December 1889 Tasman Bay, New Zealand
- Died: 15 September 1964 (aged 74)

Sport
- Sport: Rowing
- Club: New Zealand Expeditionary Force Rowing Club
Medal record
Representing New Zealand
Olympic Games
Bronze medal – third place	1920 Antwerp	Single sculls

Darcy Clarence Hadfield (1 December 1889 – 15 September 1964) was a New Zealand rower who won a bronze medal at the 1920 Summer Olympics in Antwerp. In doing so, he became the first Olympic medallist who represented New Zealand; previous New Zealand medallists had represented Australasia. Subsequently he became the third New Zealander to hold the professional World Sculling Championship.

== Biography ==
Hadfield's parents were William and Adele (née Snow). Since their wedding in 1878, they had lived in the cottage that he had built at the Awapoto River. The location was secluded and his father saw his Harry brother only sporadically as it involved travel across the Awaroa Inlet, for which the tide had to be right. His mother was unhappy with their isolation and they built a homestead—Meadowbank—close to his brother's place. They moved there in 1884; the homestead still stands and is now tourist accommodation on the Abel Tasman Coast Track.

Darcy Clarence Hadfield was born at Meadowbank Homestead on 1 December 1889. He was named after two of his mother's brothers: Darcy Stuart Snow (1871–1939) and Clarence Herbert Snow (1867–1930). In 1890, the Hadfield brothers had 11 children between them who were over the age of 5, and they decided to build a school that year. It was here that Darcy Hadfield received his education.

Hadfield moved to Auckland in December 1910 shortly after turning 21. He had helped his father building boats and found work in Auckland as a carpenter. Encouraged by his employer, he took up rowing as a sport. He wrote to his family, telling them that he had won the 1913 sculling championship on the Waitematā Harbour. It caused great amusement with his brothers, as rowing was their way of life and often seen as a chore. Darcy did not stand out as a particularly strong rower and his brother Fred, ten years his senior, would always beat him in a straight race, but Darcy was dominant in Auckland. He won the New Zealand single sculls title in three consecutive years, from 1913 to 1915. In 1916 he married Sarita May Coyle. He joined the army and served in World War I where he was wounded in the head.

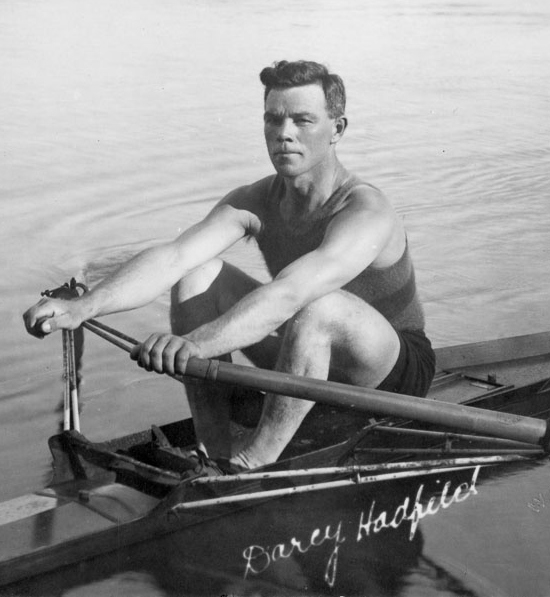
Darcy Hadfield c. 1920

After the war Hadfield competed at the Inter-Allied Games where he won the single sculls. The same year, 1919, he won the Kingswood Cup for single sculls at the 1919 Henley Regatta. He was then part of the first separate New Zealand Olympic team and was the only medallist.

In 1922 Hadfield turned professional and won the World Sculling Title on the Wanganui River on 5 January.

After retiring from competitive international rowing Hadfield was involved many aspects of the sport until his death in 1964. In 1990 he was inducted into the New Zealand Sports Hall of Fame.
