= Armchair Island =

Island in New Zealand

- Interactive map of Armchair Island

Geography
- Coordinates: 40.95770°S 173.06883°E

Administration
- New Zealand
- Region: Tasman

Demographics
- Population: uninhabited

Armchair Island is an island in the Anchor Bay of Tasman, New Zealand. It is north of Motuareronui / Adele Island.
