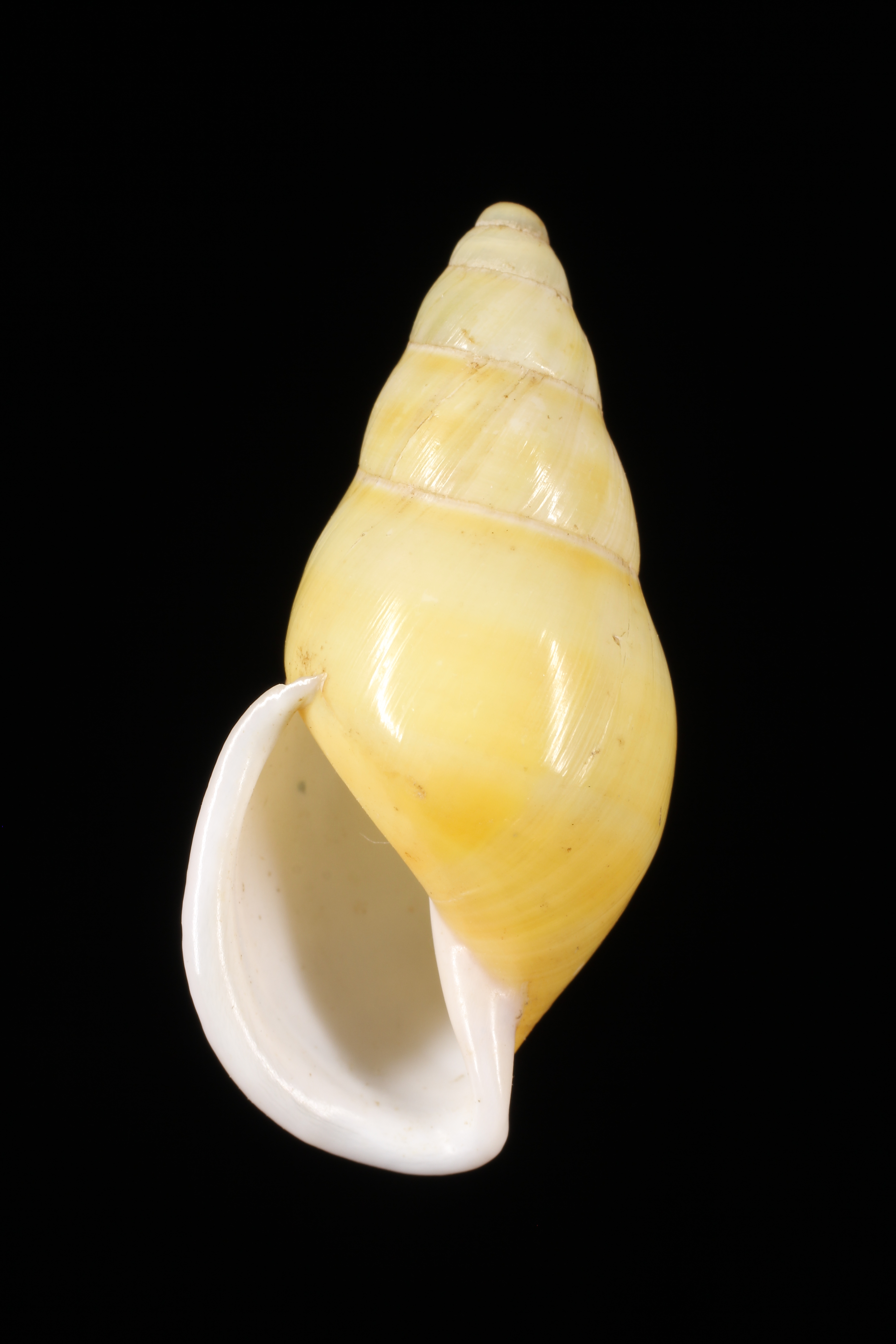
- Shell of Amphidromus feliciae (holotype at the MNHN, Paris)

Scientific classification
- Kingdom: Animalia
- Phylum: Mollusca
- Class: Gastropoda
- Order: Stylommatophora
- Family: Camaenidae
- Genus: Amphidromus
- Species: A. feliciae

Binomial name
- Amphidromus feliciae Thach & Abbas, 2020

= Amphidromus feliciae =

Species of tree snail

Amphidromus feliciae is a species of air-breathing tree snail, an arboreal gastropod mollusk in the family Camaenidae.

== Description ==
The length of this sinister shell attains 32.9 mm.

== Distribution ==
This species is endemic to Tonga Island.
