= Janus Ooms =

Dutch rower

J.J.K (Janus) Ooms (15 Augustus 1866, in Amsterdam – 6 November 1924, in Amsterdam) was a Dutch rower who was the first non-Briton to win the Diamond Challenge Sculls at Henley Royal Regatta (in 1892).

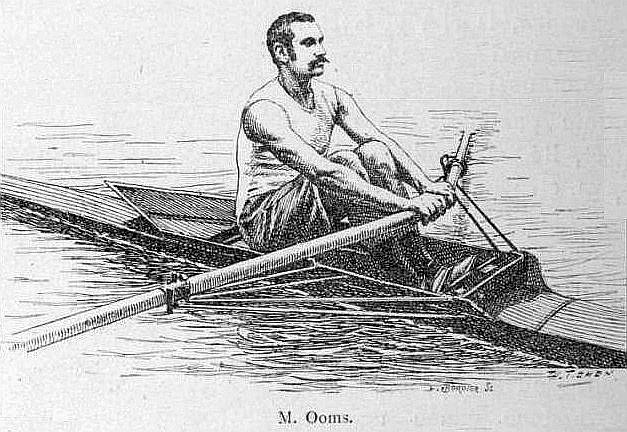
Janus Ooms (1891).

Ooms rowed for Neptune Rowing Club, Amsterdam, and was trained by Rudolf Meurer who also trained the Olympic champions François Brandt and Roelof Klein. In 1886, a group of interested sportsmen established a regatta in Amsterdam after meeting at the café Suisse "to establish the “Committee for the Championships of the Netherlands for gentlemen amateurs in single scull outriggers".

Five years later, in 1891, Ooms won the French Rowing championship (skiff), created in 1876 (first foreigner).

One year later, in 1892, Ooms became the first competitor from outside the United Kingdom to win the Diamond Challenge Sculls at Henley. On his return to Amsterdam he was greeted by huge crowds and a fireworks display.

After Ooms' victory, the Dutch Rowing Club awarded him a Golden Belt with the figure of a rower on it. In 1921 he passed this on to the next Dutch rower to win the Diamond Challenge Sculls Frits Eijken.
