= Frits Eijken =

Dutch rower

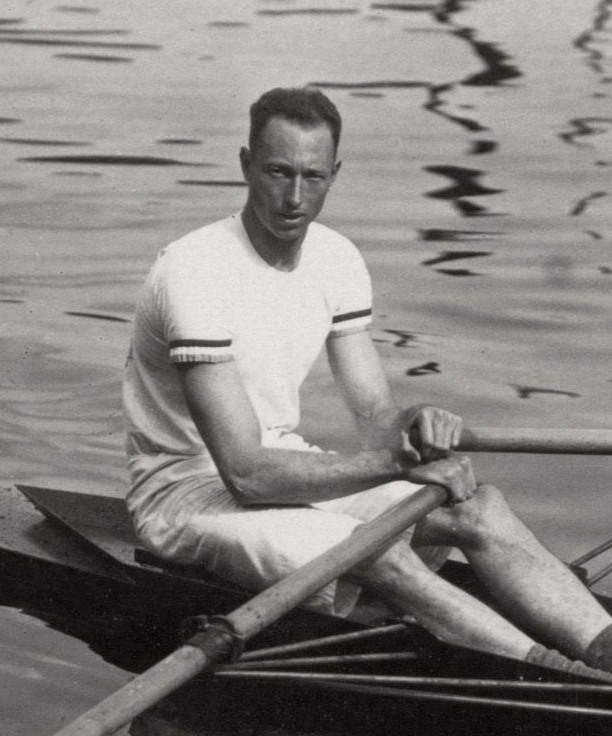
- Eijken at the 1920 Olympics

Personal information
- Born: Frits Evert Eijken; 30 June 1893 Jakarta, Indonesia
- Died: 6 June 1978 (aged 84) Zwolle, the Netherlands

Sport
- Sport: Rowing
- Club: Laga, Delft
Medal record
Men's rowing
Representing the Netherlands
European Rowing Championships
Gold medal – first place	1921 Amsterdam	Single sculls

Frits Evert Eijken (30 June 1893 – 6 June 1978) was a Dutch rower. He competed at the 1920 Summer Olympics in the single sculls, but failed to reach the final. In 1921, Eijken won the Diamond Challenge Sculls at Henley Royal Regatta beating Jack Beresford in the final. Following Eijken's victory, Janus Ooms passed on to him the "Golden Belt" he was awarded in 1892. Eijken, in turn, passed it on to the next Dutch Diamonds winner Bert Gunther in 1929.
