= Fisherman Island (New Zealand) =

Island in the Tasman District, New Zealand

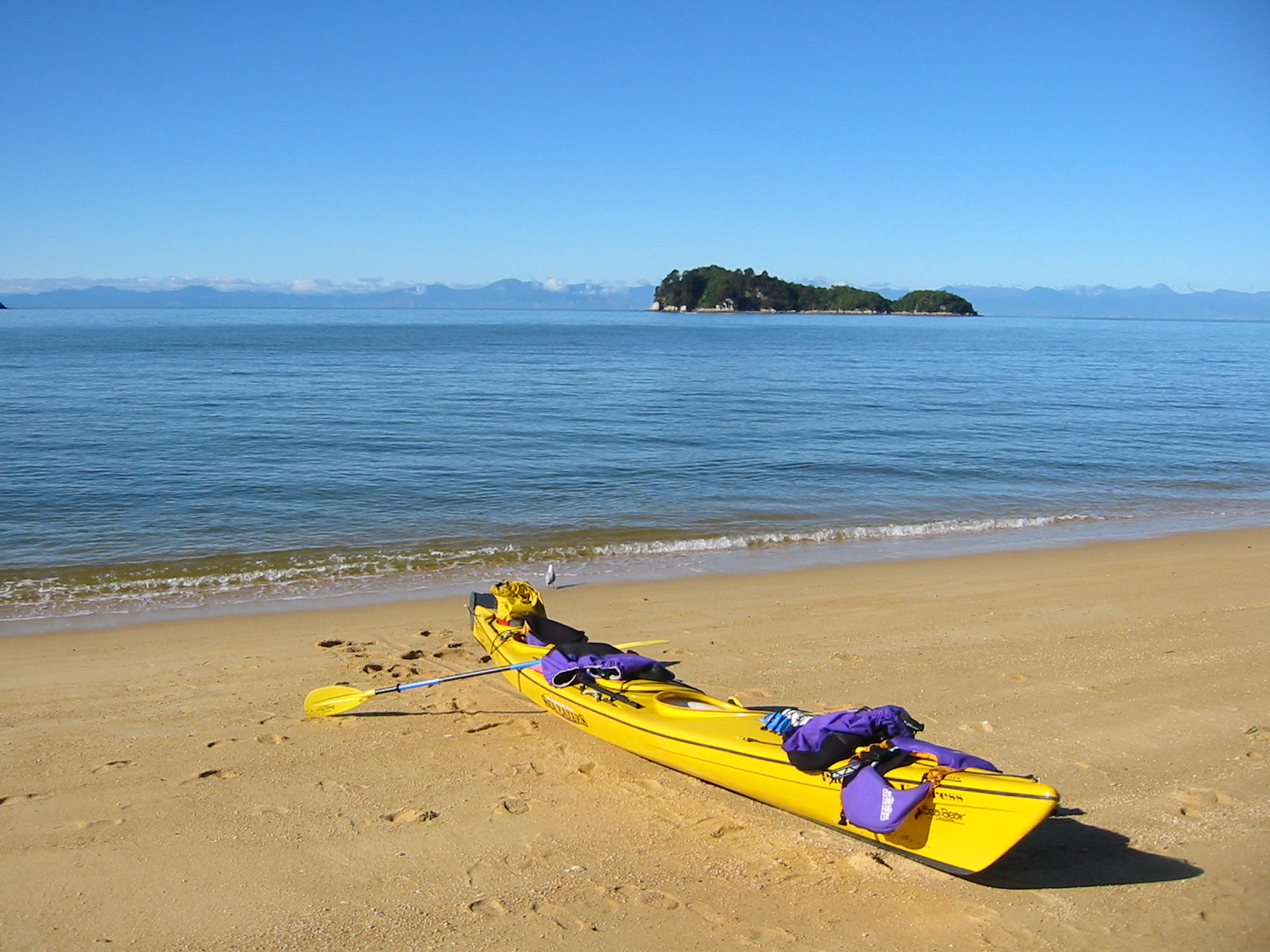
- The island from the sandy spit on Adele Island

- Location within South Island Location within New Zealand

Geography
- Location: Tasman Bay / Te Tai-o-Aorere
- Coordinates: 40°59′33″S 173°03′03″E
- Total islands: 1

Administration
- New Zealand

Fisherman Island is a small uninhabited island off the coast of New Zealand. It is contained within Abel Tasman National Park and adjacent to Motuareronui / Adele Island.

In August 2014, the name of the neighbouring island was officially altered to Motuareronui / Adele Island. Motu means island, arero is a tongue and nui is big; hence, Motuareronui literally means the big island shaped like a tongue, which makes Motuareroiti / Fisherman Island (with iti meaning little) the little island shaped like a tongue; however, in his comprehensive book on natural and cultural history of Abel Tasman National Park, Philip Simpson suggests the two islands are incorrectly named, as follows:

Tongues (arero) are important to Māori culture... the islands are not, however, noticeable tongue shaped. A recent official change as a result of the Treaty settlement is that Tasman Bay is shared with Te Tai o Aorere. This supports the suggestion that the two islands are incorrectly named and should be Motuaorerenui and Motuaorereiti.

== See also ==
- Desert island
- List of islands
