= Nino Castelli =

Italian rower

Personal information
- Full name: Giovanni Giulio Valentino Castelli
- Nationality: Italian
- Born: 7 February 1897 Lecco, Italy
- Died: 24 May 1925 (aged 28) Lecco, Italy

Sport
- Sport: Rowing

Nino Castelli (1897–1925) was an Italian rower. He competed in the men's single sculls event at the 1920 Summer Olympics.

"Nino" was just his nickname as the rowing fellows used to shorten his name this way when he arrived at Canottieri Lecco.

He also entered the Lecco Football Club when first founded in December 1908.
