= Nils Ljunglöf =

Swedish rower

Personal information
- Nationality: Swedish
- Born: 5 January 1896 Stockholm, Sweden
- Died: 18 August 1976 (aged 80) Stockholm, Sweden

Sport
- Sport: Rowing

Nils Ljunglöf (5 January 1896 – 18 August 1976) was a Swedish rower. He competed in the men's single sculls event at the 1920 Summer Olympics.
