= Awaroa River =

Awaroa River in New Zealand may refer to:

- Awaroa River (Far North), in Far North District
- Awaroa River (Kaipara), in Kaipara District
- Awaroa River (Waikato River tributary), in Waikato District
- Awaroa River (Kawhia Harbour tributary), in Ōtorohanga District
- Awaroa River (Tasman), in Tasman District
