= Jacques Haller =

Belgian rower

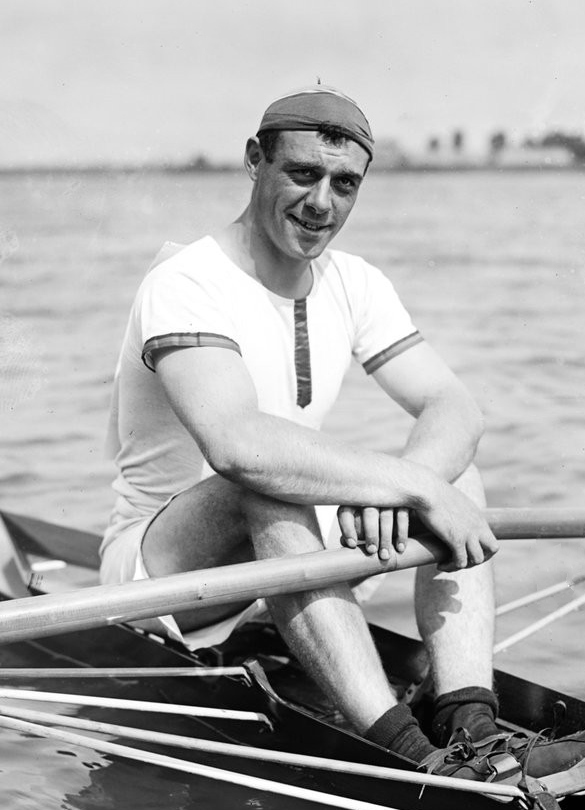
- Jacques Haller at the 1920 European Championships

Personal information
- Born: Jacques Edmond Haller; 3 March 1897 Ghent, Belgium
- Died: 19 December 1961 (aged 64) Ghent, Belgium

Sport
- Sport: Rowing
- Club: KRCG, Gent
Medal record
Men's rowing
Representing Belgium
European Rowing Championships
| Bronze medal – third place | 1920 Mâcon | Single sculls |
| Bronze medal – third place | 1921 Amsterdam | Eight |

Jacques Edmond Haller (3 March 1897 – 19 December 1961) was a Belgian rower who won two bronze medals at the European championships of 1920–1921. He competed at the 1920 Summer Olympics in the single scull event, but failed to reach the final.
