= Tonga Island =

Island in New Zealand

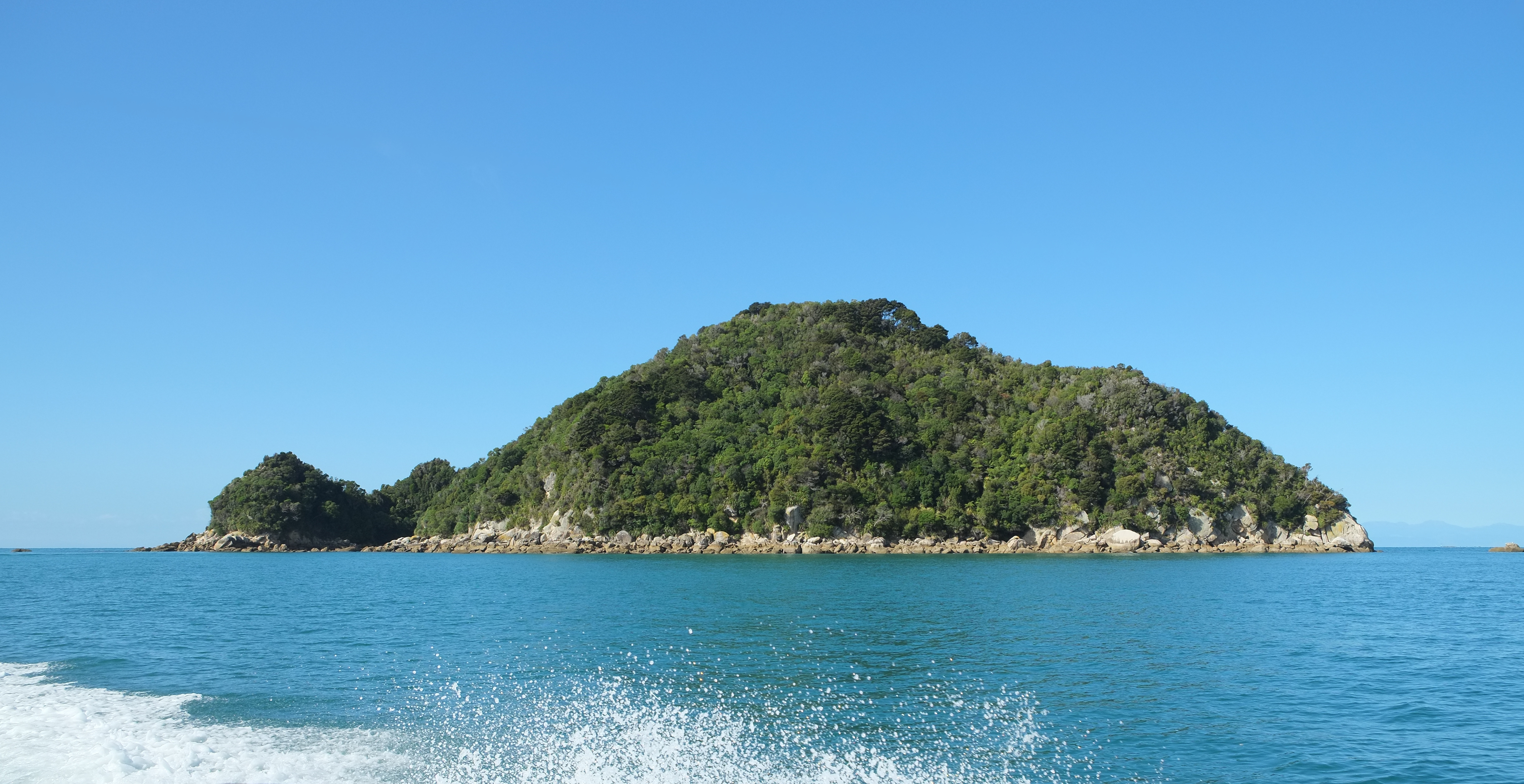
- Tonga Island from water taxi

- Location within South Island Location within New Zealand

Geography
- Location: Tasman Bay / Te Tai-o-Aorere, New Zealand
- Coordinates: 40°53′25″S 173°04′02″E
- Total islands: 1
- Area: 0.15 km^{2} (0.058 sq mi)
- Length: 0.5 km (0.31 mi)
- Width: 0.5 km (0.31 mi)
- Highest elevation: 83 m (272 ft)

Administration
- New Zealand

Tonga Island is a small (0.15 km^{2}) island in Tasman Bay / Te Tai-o-Aorere, off the northern coast of the South Island of New Zealand. It lies within the Abel Tasman National Park, about 1 kilometre (0.62 mi) off Onetahuti Beach. The island has a flourishing fur seal colony, and is surrounded by the Tonga Island Marine Reserve, which was inaugurated in 1993.

The island is accessible by water taxi or kayak and visible from the Abel Tasman Coast Track.

The first peoples named the place after a small island in their east Polynesian homeland.

== See also ==
- List of islands of New Zealand
- List of islands
- Desert island
