= Tonga Island Marine Reserve =

Marine reserve in New Zealand

- Location within New Zealand
- Location: New Zealand
- Nearest city: Nelson
- Coordinates: 40.8802°S 173.0745°E
- Area: 1,835 ha (4,530 acres)
- Established: 1993
- Governing body: Department of Conservation

Tonga Island Marine Reserve is a protected area on the northern coast of the South Island of New Zealand. It surrounds Tonga Island and is next to the Abel Tasman National Park. The marine reserve was created in 1993 and covers an area of 1,835 hectares (7.08 sq mi).

== See also ==
- Marine reserves of New Zealand
