= Abel Tasman National Park =

National park in New Zealand

- IUCN category II (national park)
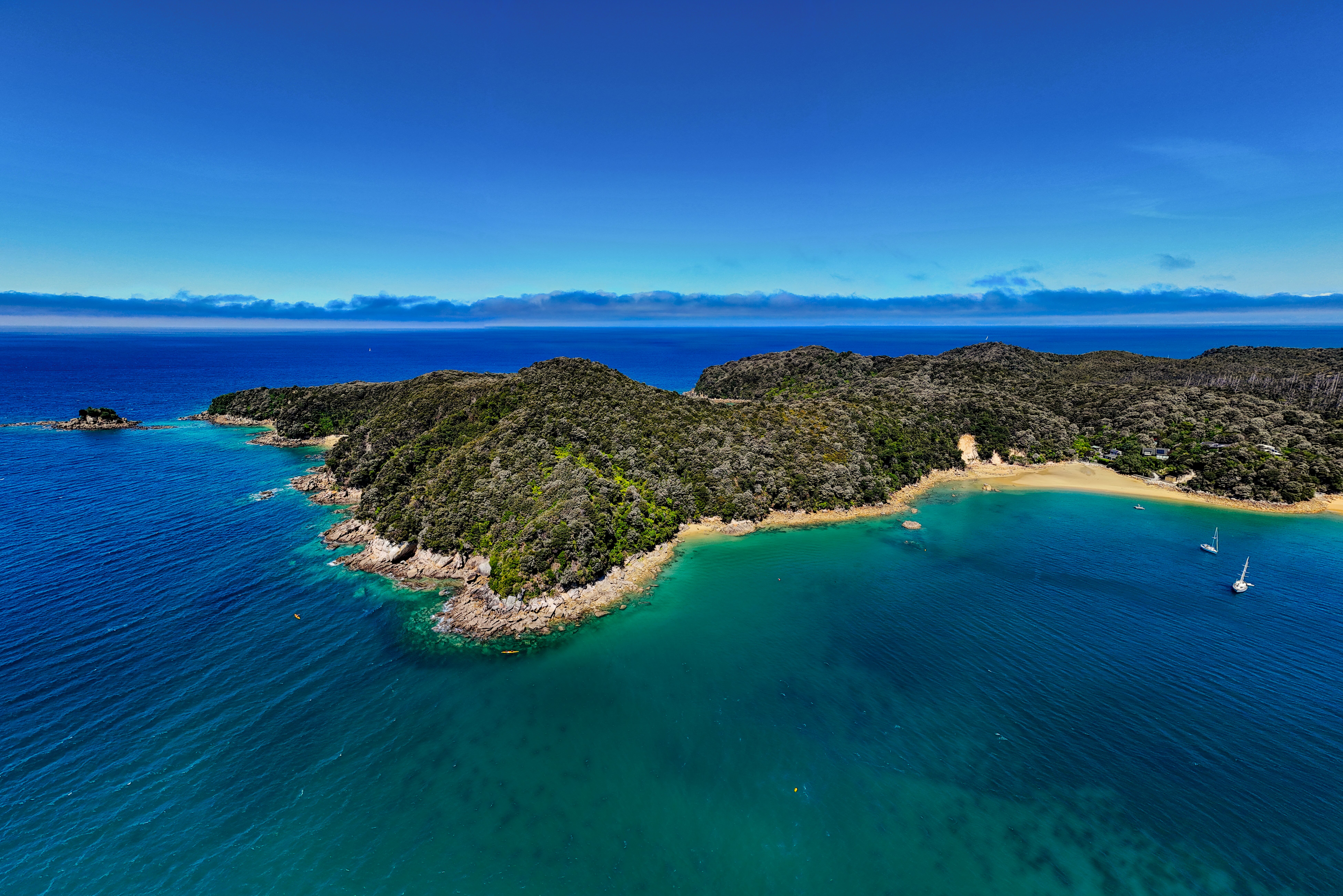
- Pitt Head
- Interactive map of Abel Tasman National Park
- Location: Tasman District, New Zealand
- Nearest town: Motueka · Tākaka
- Coordinates: 40.900°S 172.971°E
- Area: 237.1 km^{2} (91.5 sq mi)
- Established: 1942
- Governing body: Department of Conservation

Abel Tasman National Park is a national park at the north end of New Zealand's South Island. It covers 237.1 km^{2} (91.5 sq mi) of land between Golden Bay / Mohua and Tasman Bay / Te Tai-o-Aorere, making it the smallest of New Zealand's national parks. Despite this, the park is one of the most visited, partially due to the popularity of the Abel Tasman Coast Track which spans 60 km (37 mi) along the eastern and northern coastal areas of the park.

The area of the park has seen human interaction for approximately 700 years, with evidence of habitation dating back to early Māori iwi such as Waitaha and Rapuwai during the early periods of Māori habitation in New Zealand. Following the arrival of Pākehā in the 19th century, the area saw widespread deforestation, farming, and quarrying, significantly modifying the area's environment. As a result of this, the park is one of the most modified landscapes of any of New Zealand's national parks, with management of the park largely focusing on regeneration and restoration of the traditional ecosystem.

The park was first established in 1942 to commemorate the 300th anniversary of Abel Tasman's 1642 visit in New Zealand, when he became the first European to sight the islands. It has since been progressively expanded from its original borders, the most recent of which involved the addition of 7 hectares (17 acres) in Awaroa Inlet after a successful crowdfunding campaign.

== History ==
The coastal area was inhabited for hundreds of years by Māori prior to the arrival of Europeans, with sites throughout the area occupied both seasonally and permanently. In addition to harvesting food from the local forests, estuaries and waters, locals grew kūmara.

Historical records indicate a pā was established at Auckland Point by Pohea, who travelled there around 1450 from the Whanganui area. From the mid-1500s Muaūpoko (formerly known as Ngāi Tara) occupied the area until the early 1600s, when they were ousted by Ngāti Tūmatakōkiri. Ngāti Tūmatakōkiri were present when Abel Tasman reached Golden Bay / Mohua in 1642.

=== Park establishment ===
The park was founded in 1942, largely through the efforts of ornithologist and author Pérrine Moncrieff to have land reserved for the purpose. Moncrieff served on the park board from 1943 to 1974.

The park was opened on 18 December 1942 to mark the 300th anniversary of Abel Tasman's visit. Those in attendance at the opening ceremony at Tarakohe included Charles van der Plas, as personal representative of the Netherlands' Queen, Wilhelmina. The Queen was made Patron of the park.

The idea for the park had been under consideration since June 1938. The Crown set aside 15,225 hectares (37,622 acres), comprising 8,900 hectares (21,900 acres) of proposed state forest, 5,809 hectares (14,354 acres) of Crown land and 554 hectares (1,368 acres) of other reserve land for the national park. The Golden Bay Cement Company donated the land where the Abel Tasman Monument and a memorial plaque was sited. The area's primary historic interest was the visit of Tasman in 1642, D'Urville in 1827, and the New Zealand Company barques Whitby and Will Watch, and brig Arrow in 1841. The site was also of significant botanical interest.

=== Expansion ===
By 1946 the park had reached 15,534 hectares (38,386 acres) in area with additional land purchases. A further 844 hectares (2,085 acres) at Tōtaranui, formerly owned by William Gibbs, was acquired from J S Campbell in 1949 and added to the park. About 6,100 hectares (15,000 acres) have been added since. In 2008 an extra 7.9 km^{2} (790 ha; 3.1 sq mi), including the formerly private land known as Hadfields Clearing, were added to the park.

In 2016, a further 7 hectares (17 acres) in Awaroa Inlet was purchased by New Zealanders in a crowdfunding campaign.

== Geography ==
=== Location and size ===
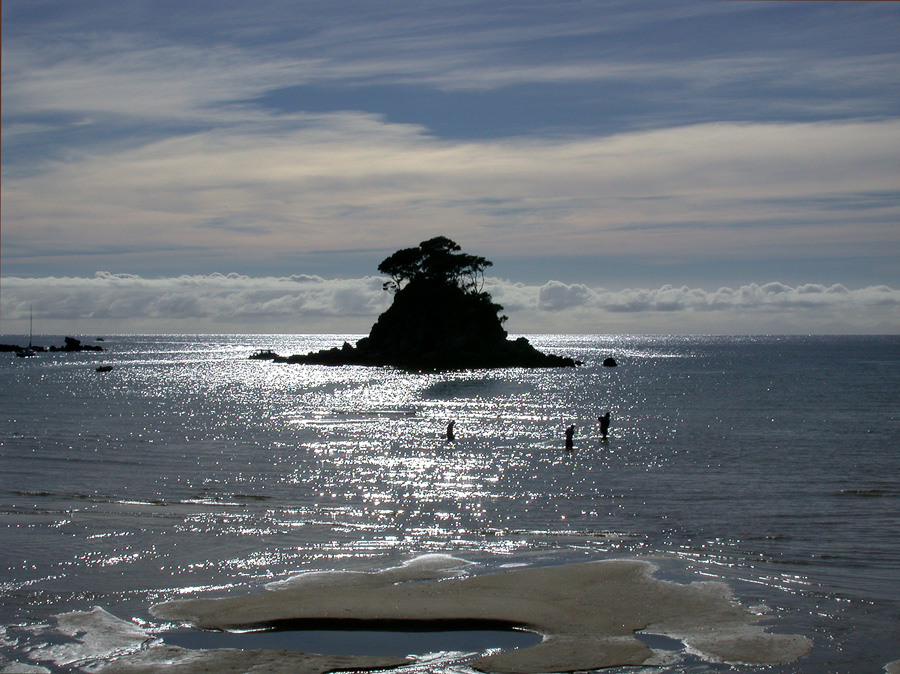
Rākauroa / Torrent Bay at Abel Tasman National Park

Covering an area of 237 km^{2} (92 sq mi; 59,000 acres), the park is the smallest of New Zealand's national parks. It consists of forested, hilly country to the north of the valleys of the Tākaka and Riwaka Rivers, and is bounded to the north by the waters of Golden Bay / Mohua and Tasman Bay. The park contains some of the islands off the coast including the Tata Islands in Golden Bay / Mohua, and Tonga Island, Motuareronui / Adele Island, and Fisherman Island in Tasman Bay.

The park does not extend beyond Mean High Water Mark on the adjacent coast. Between Mean High Water and Mean Low Water Springs, the beaches are gazetted as a Scenic Reserve, covering 7.74 km^{2} (2.99 sq mi) in total. The Tonga Island Marine Reserve adjoins part of the park.

The Abel Tasman Monument, located in an exclave of the main park, commemorates the first contact between Europeans and Māori and is located near the northern end of the park.

=== Climate ===
Climate data for Tōtaranui (1981–2010)
Month	Jan	Feb	Mar	Apr	May	Jun	Jul	Aug	Sep	Oct	Nov	Dec	Year
Mean daily maximum °C (°F)	22.4 (72.3)	22.6 (72.7)	21.0 (69.8)	18.3 (64.9)	16.2 (61.2)	13.7 (56.7)	13.1 (55.6)	13.7 (56.7)	15.4 (59.7)	16.9 (62.4)	18.5 (65.3)	20.4 (68.7)	17.7 (63.8)
Daily mean °C (°F)	17.4 (63.3)	17.8 (64.0)	16.3 (61.3)	13.8 (56.8)	11.7 (53.1)	9.5 (49.1)	8.6 (47.5)	9.3 (48.7)	10.9 (51.6)	12.3 (54.1)	13.9 (57.0)	15.9 (60.6)	13.1 (55.6)
Mean daily minimum °C (°F)	12.3 (54.1)	12.9 (55.2)	11.6 (52.9)	9.3 (48.7)	7.2 (45.0)	5.2 (41.4)	4.0 (39.2)	4.9 (40.8)	6.5 (43.7)	7.7 (45.9)	9.3 (48.7)	11.4 (52.5)	8.5 (47.3)
Source: NIWA

== Ecology ==
Abel Tasman National Park stands out from most other National parks of New Zealand, given that a large area of it has undergone extensive environmental modification in its history. Early European settlers burned or cleared much of the forest, only to find that the soil was unsuitable for farming. This practise not only destroyed much of the shrubland and forests, but also introduced invasive plants found throughout the modern-day park. However, as time progresses, the original ecosystems and forests are slowly returning.

The park contains varied habitats, including coastal forests, sub-alpine bogs, and sand dunes. As a result of this diversity, many different species can be found. The islands of the park, in particular Tonga Island, Motuareronui / Adele Island and Fisherman Island which are the largest, have been disturbed less and have no introduced mammalian predators. As a result the islands have species not found elsewhere in the park and there are more restrictions to visitor access.

=== Flora ===
Though much of the parkland is pasture or covered with shrubs, valley areas contain forests of rātā, mataī, miro and hinau.

=== Fauna ===
Over 70 species of birds have been recorded in the park. Some of the birds that can frequently be seen are petrels, shags, penguins, gulls, terns, and herons. Possums, wild pigs, deer, and goats can also be seen in the park.

== Conservation and human interaction ==
=== Activities and access ===
The Abel Tasman Coast Track is a popular tramping track that follows the coastline and is one of the Department of Conservation's Great Walks; the Abel Tasman Inland Track is less frequented. Other walks in the park, such as the Wainui Falls Track are considered "short walks". Kayaking, camping and sightseeing are other activities.

Access to the park is usually via the small settlement of Mārahau or Kaiteretere (by water taxi). The nearest large town is Motueka, 20 kilometres (12 mi) to the south. Dogs (excepting guide dogs) are not allowed in the park.

=== Management ===
The Department of Conservation administers the National Park. The Scenic Reserve is administered by the Tasman District Council Chief Executive and Department of Conservation's Nelson / Marlborough Conservator. Activities in adjoining coastal waters are Tasman District Council's responsibility. These areas operate under separate regulations.

Management of the national park is divided into three types of "places", where visitor access and use differs between type:

1. The Coast, making up the coastal margin along the eastern side of the park inland to within 500 m of the Abel Tasman Coast Track. Management priorities include, but are not limited to, restoring wetlands and dune areas, preserving threatened plants, controlling pests, and advocacy related to land adjacent to the park. Other activities pertain to coastal access points and facilities for trampers and visitors.
2. The Interior, consisting of the park areas further inland. Park plans include ecological surveys, pest control, and protection of heritage areas and caves.
3. The Islands, encompassing all islands within the park, some of which are closed to the public. key priorities include keeping them free of invasive pests, reintroducing native species, and minimizing human impacts.
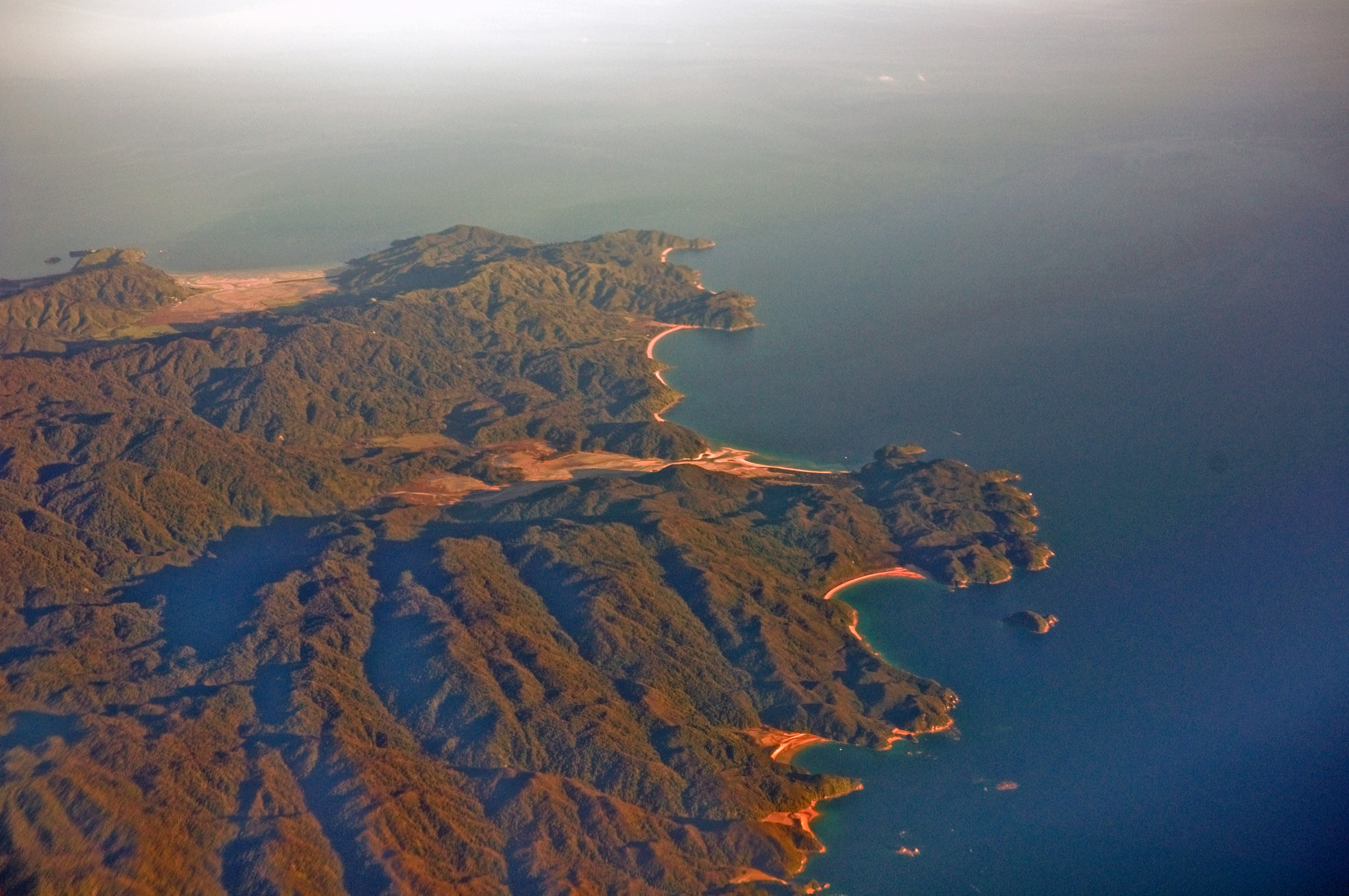
Abel Tasman National Park from the air

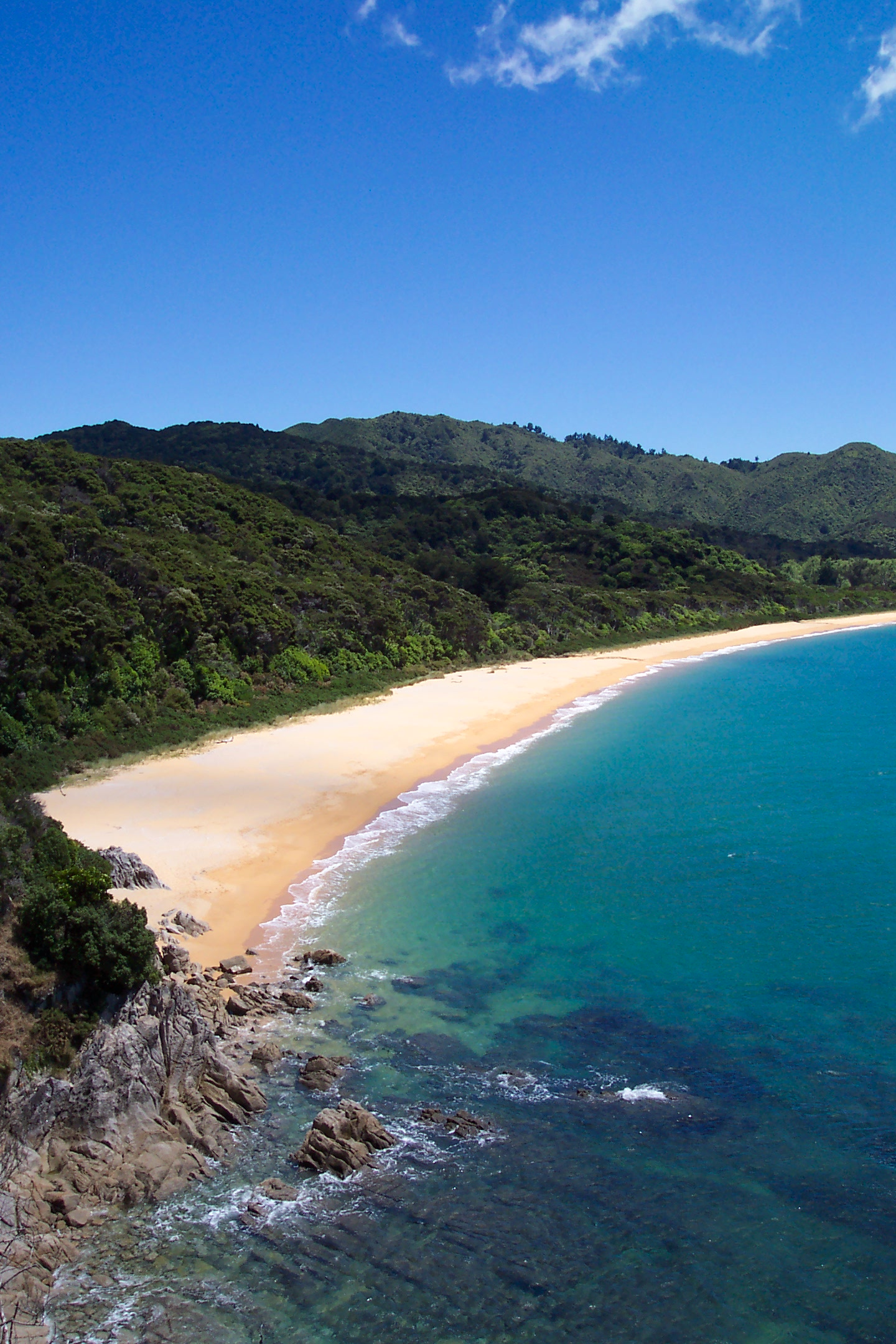
Tōtaranui, a 1 km long beach and the location of a large campsite

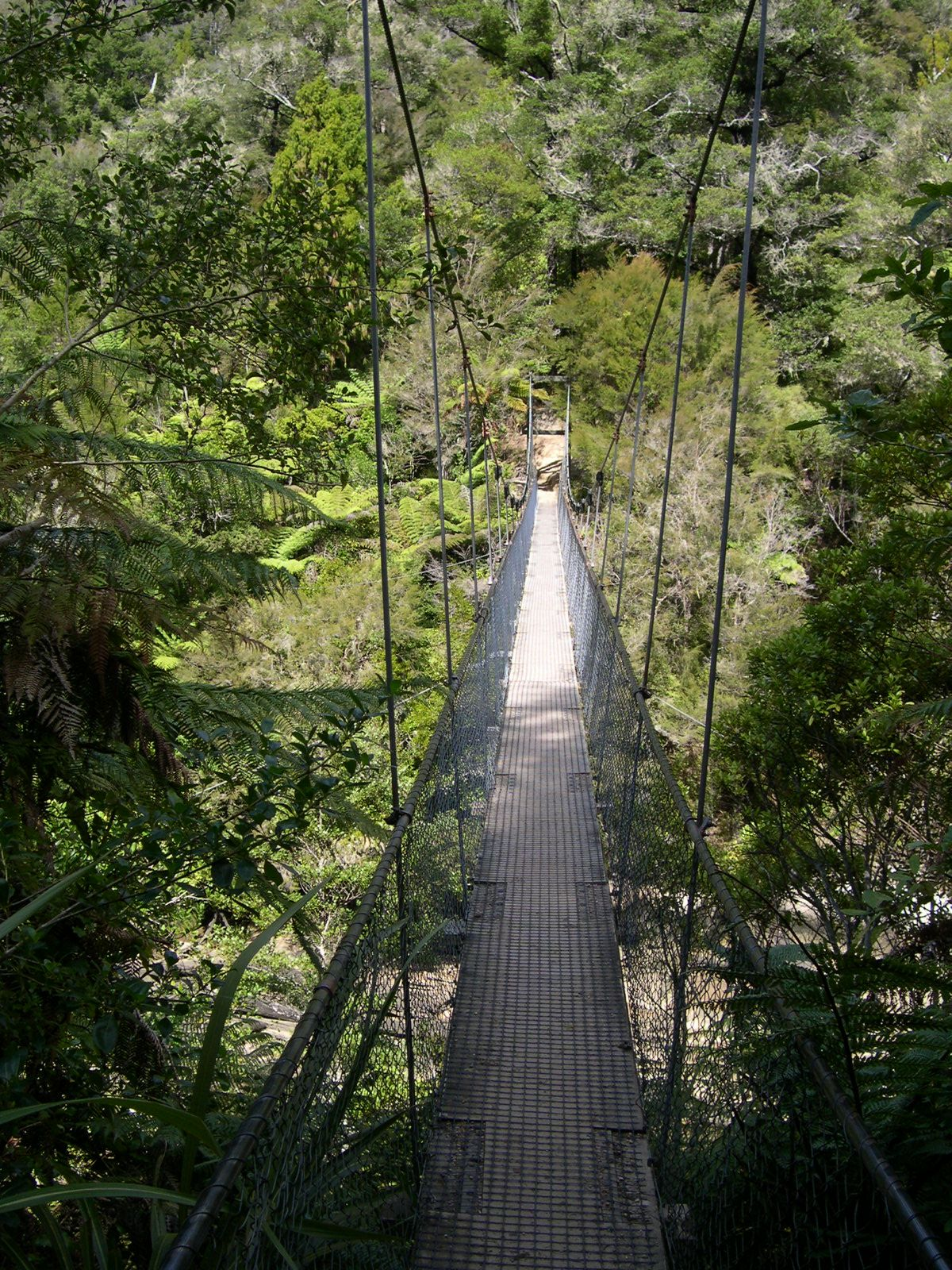
Swingbridge on the track

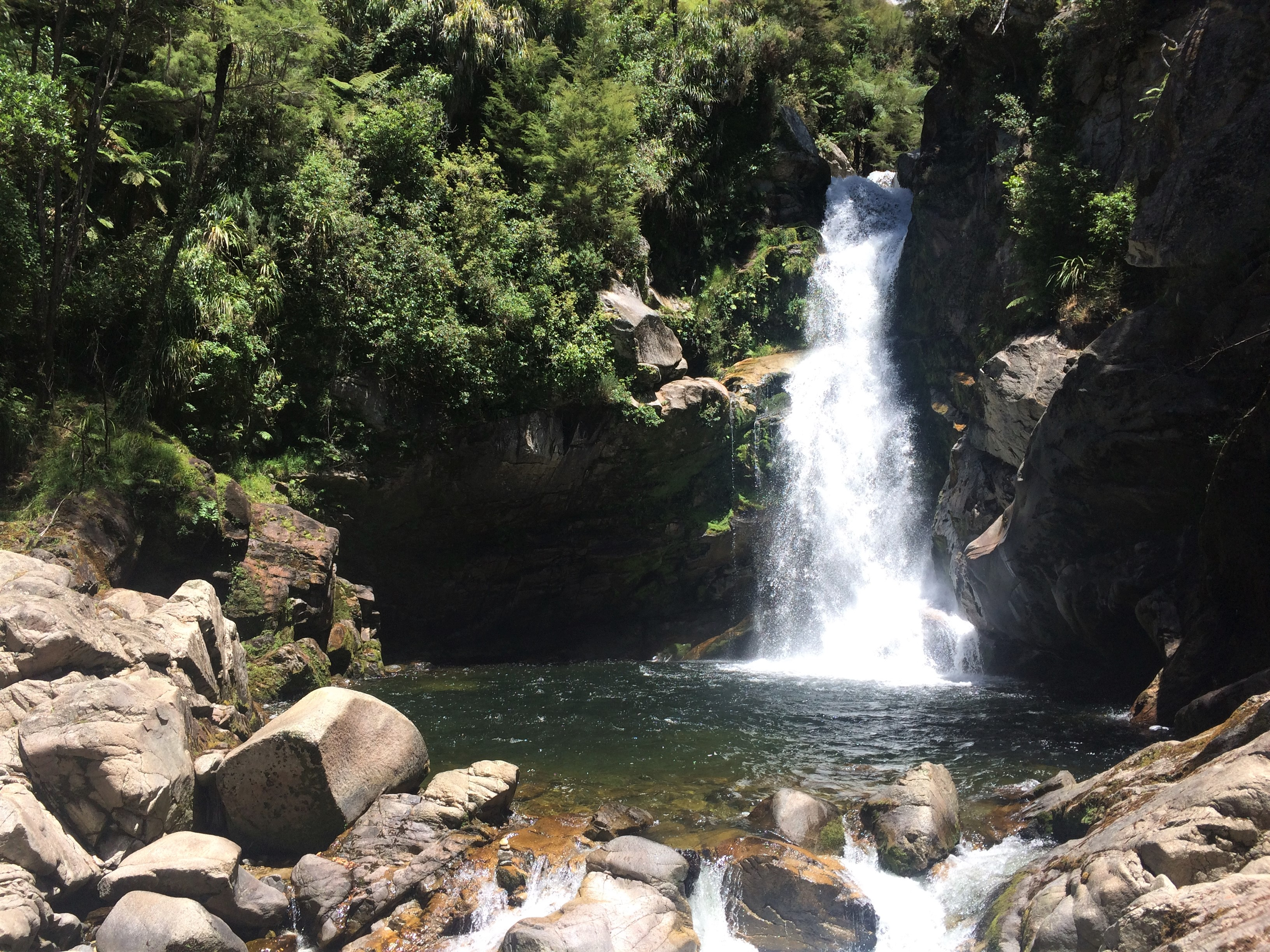
Wainui Falls, at the end of a short walk that begins in Wainui Bay

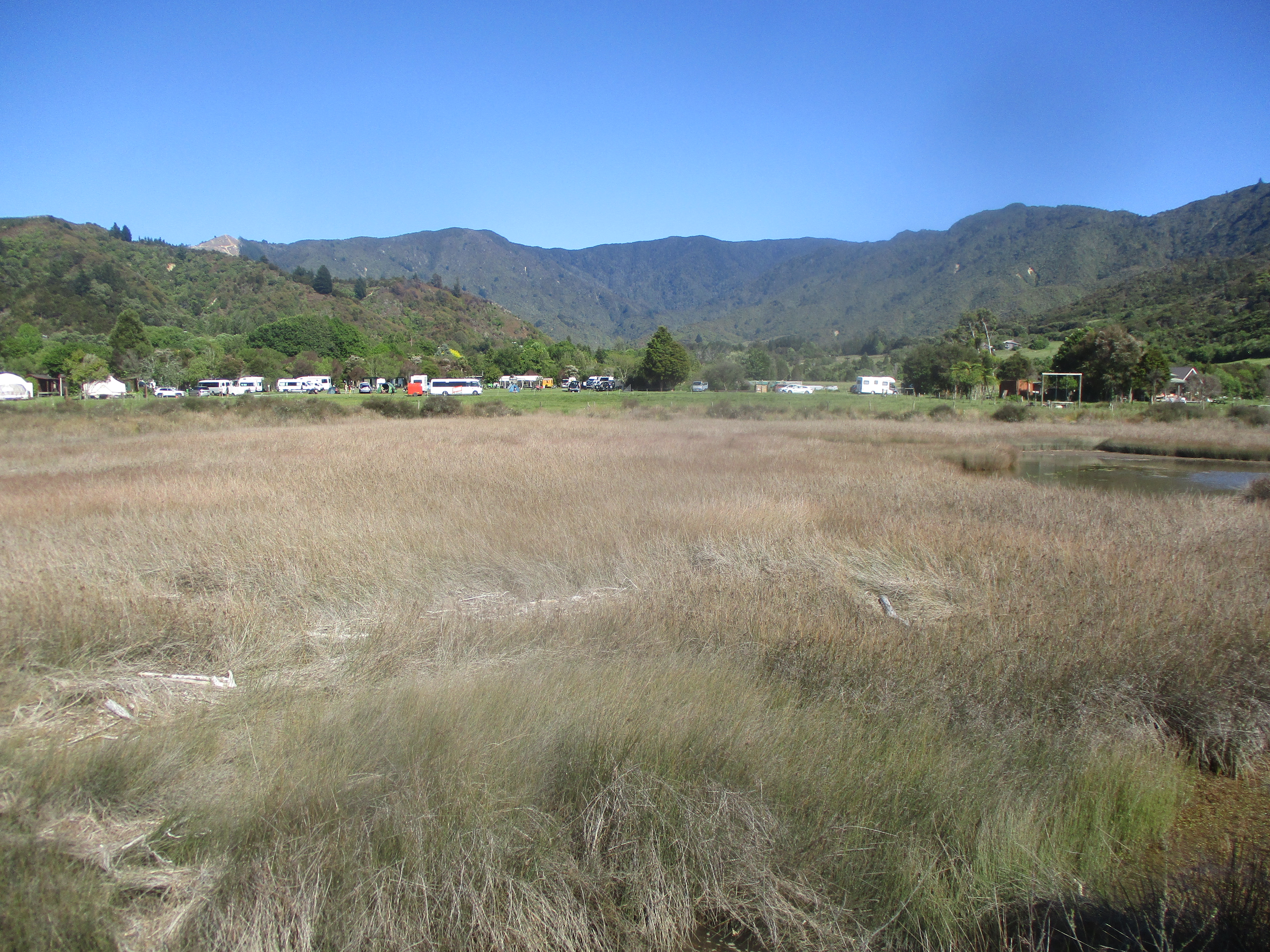

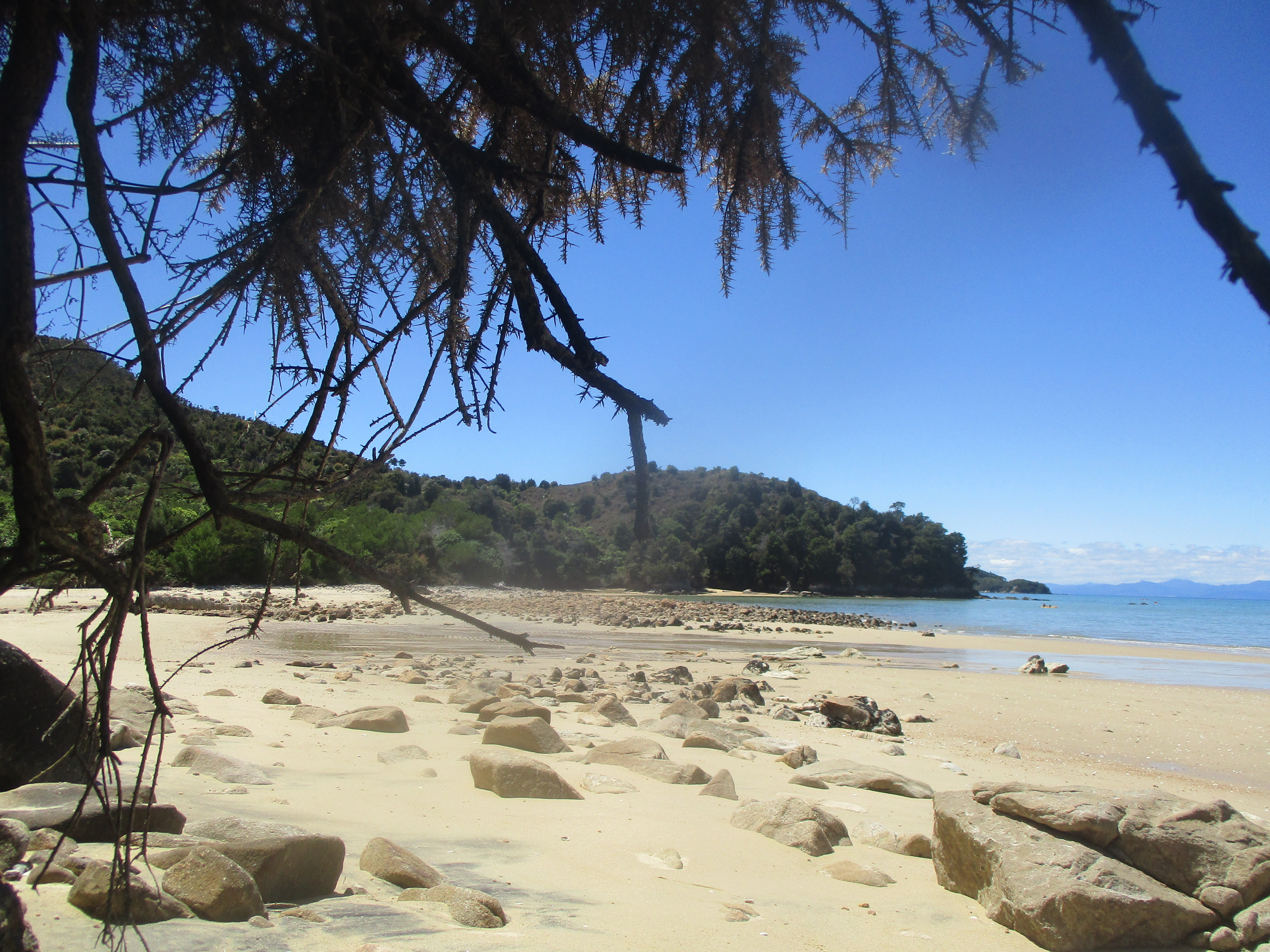

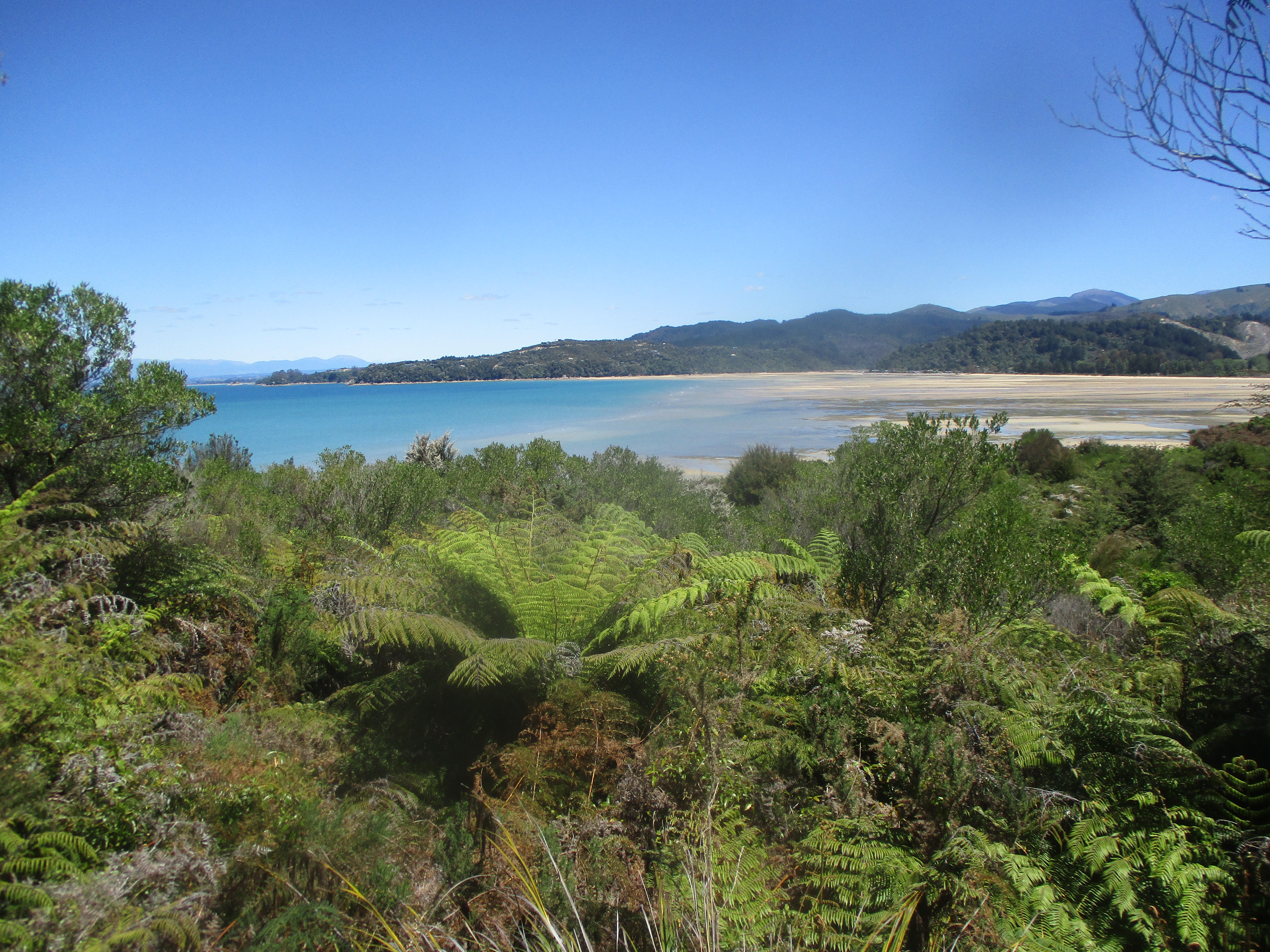

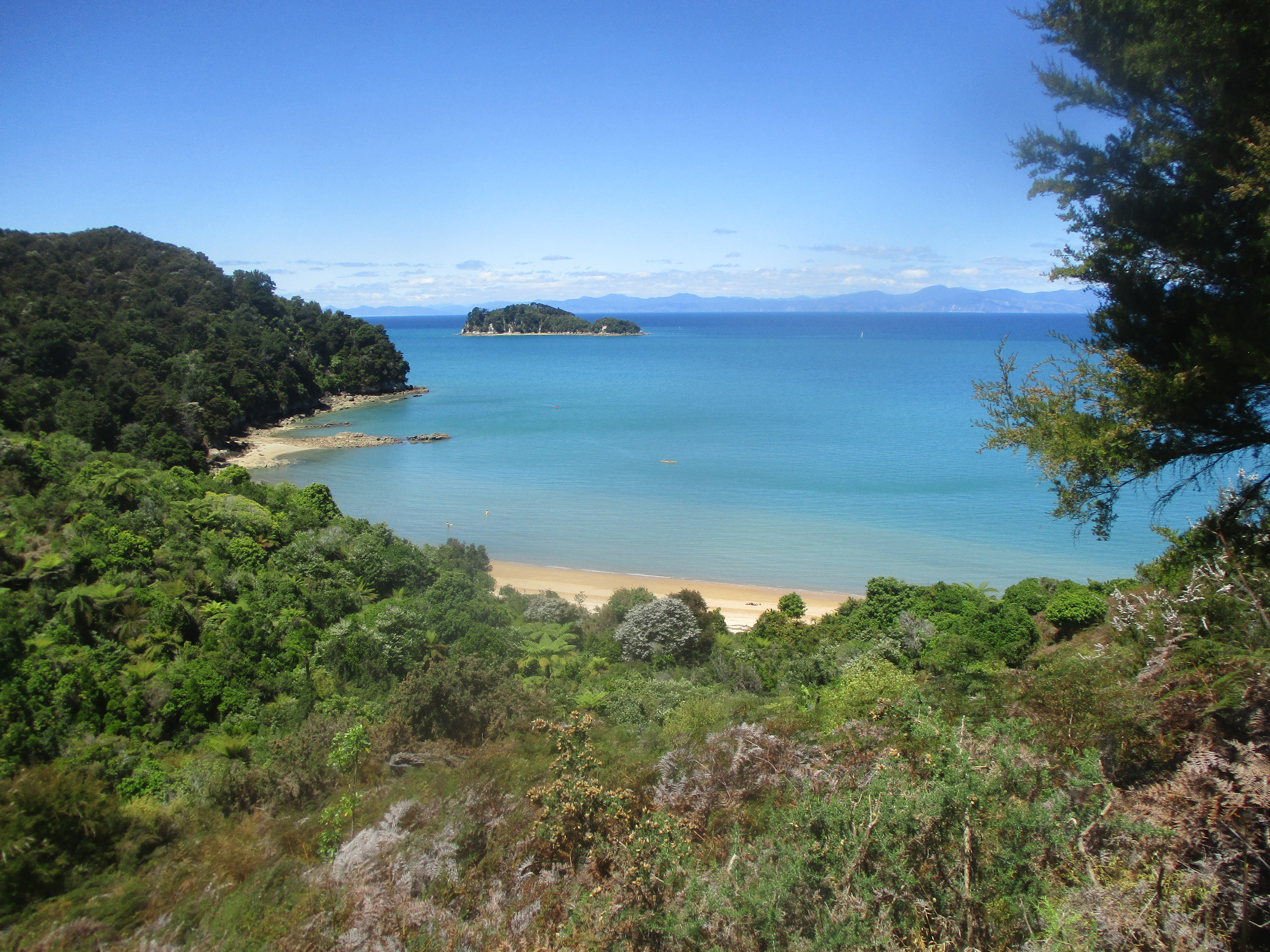

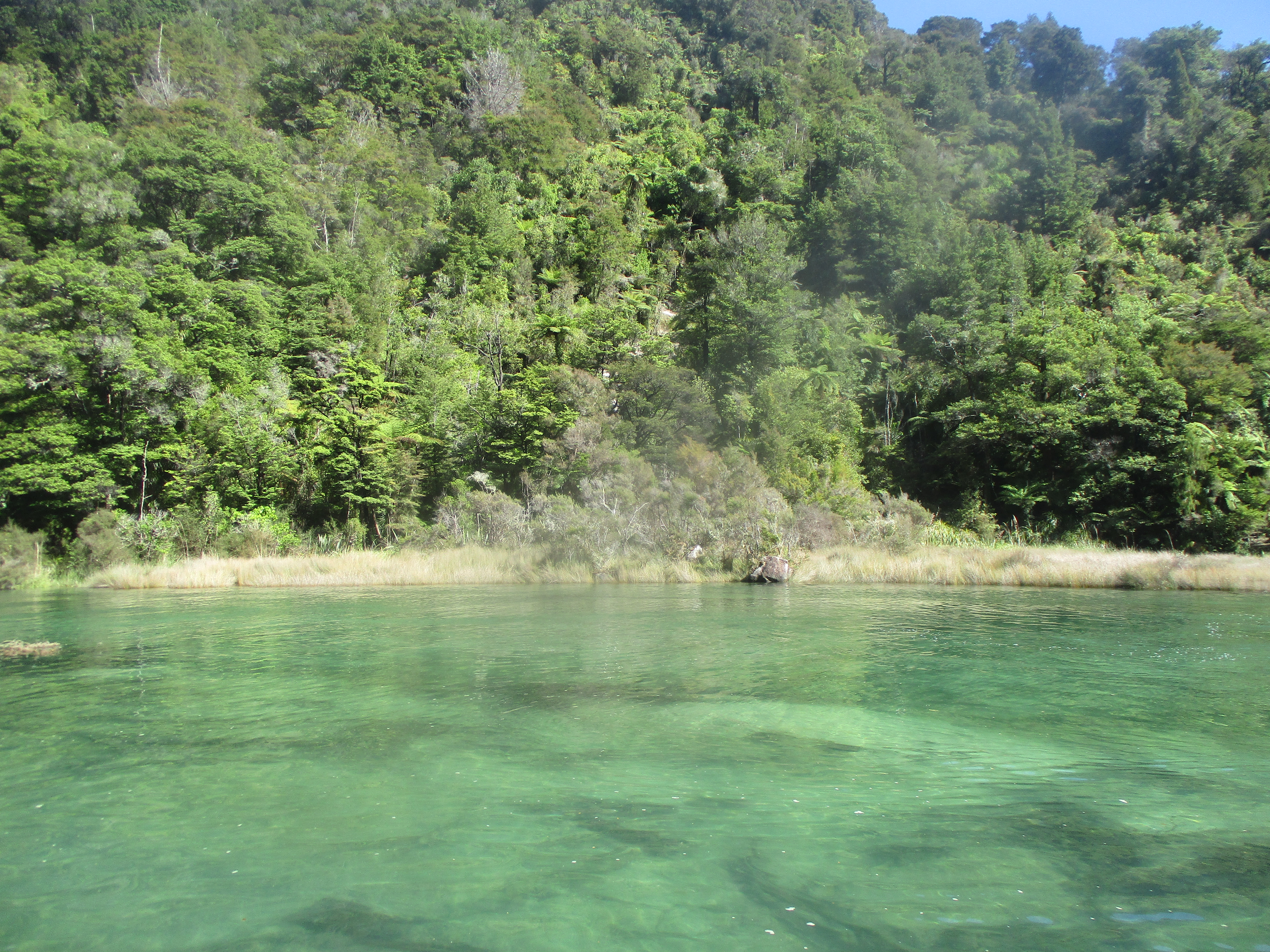

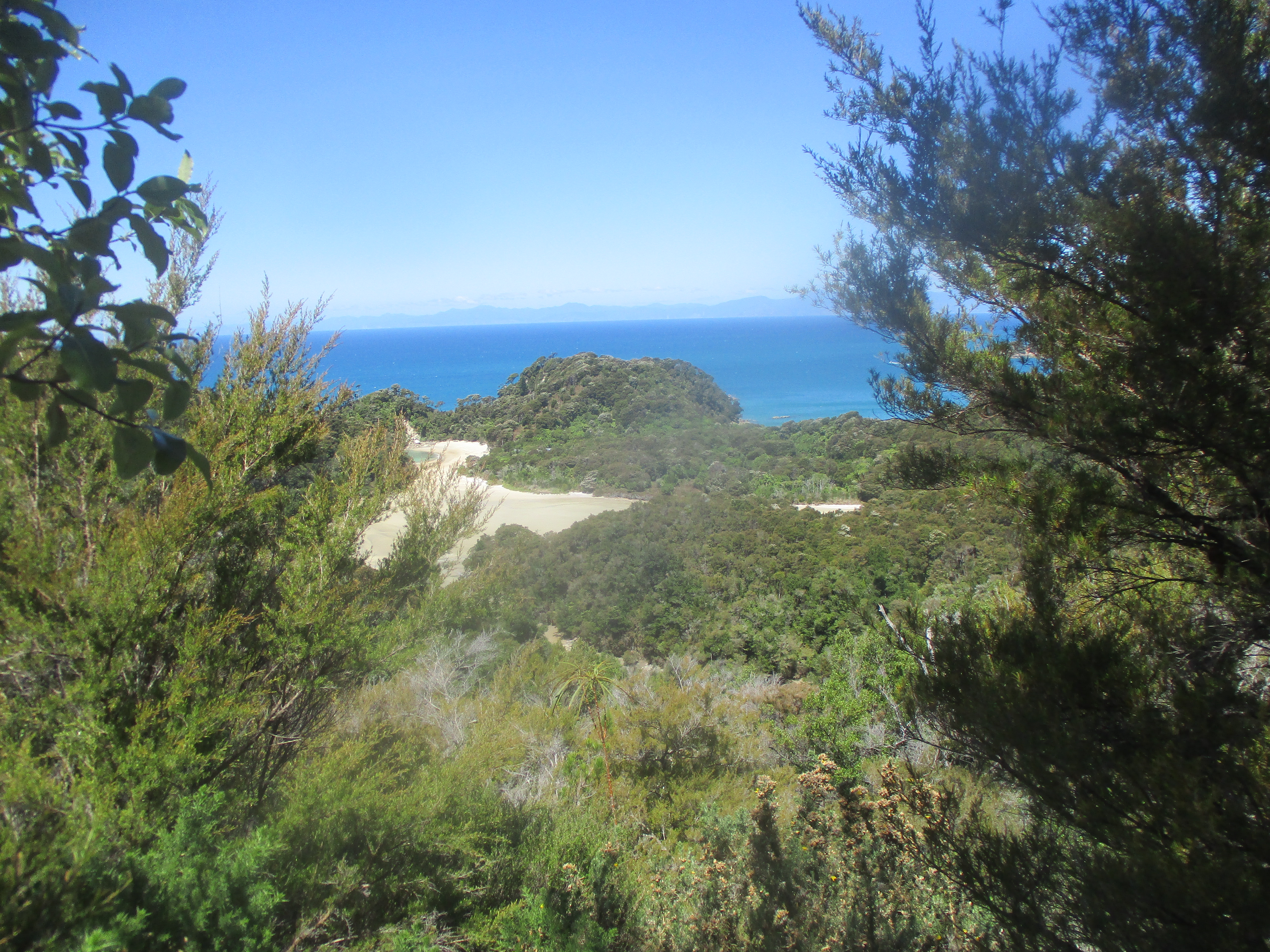

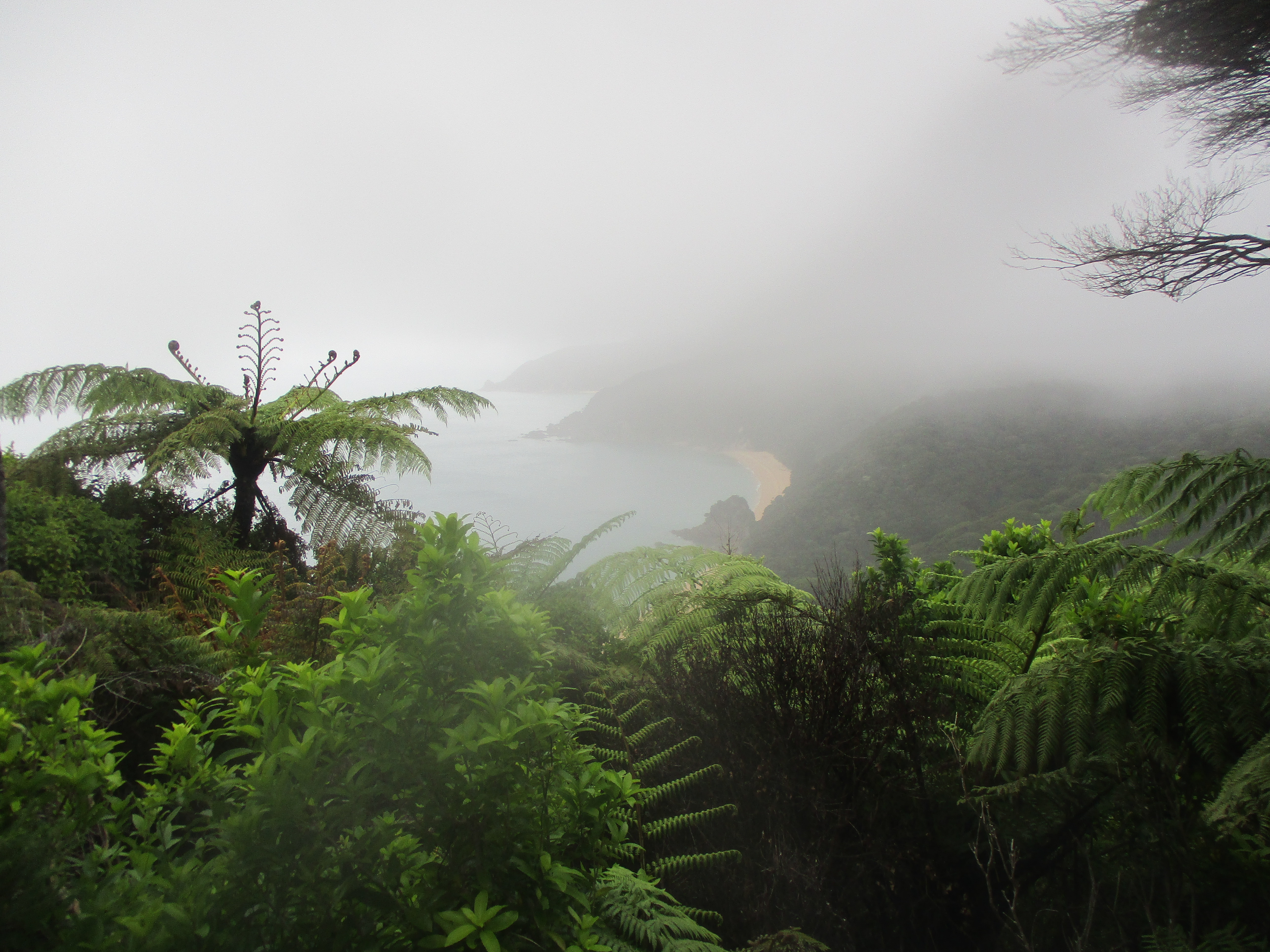

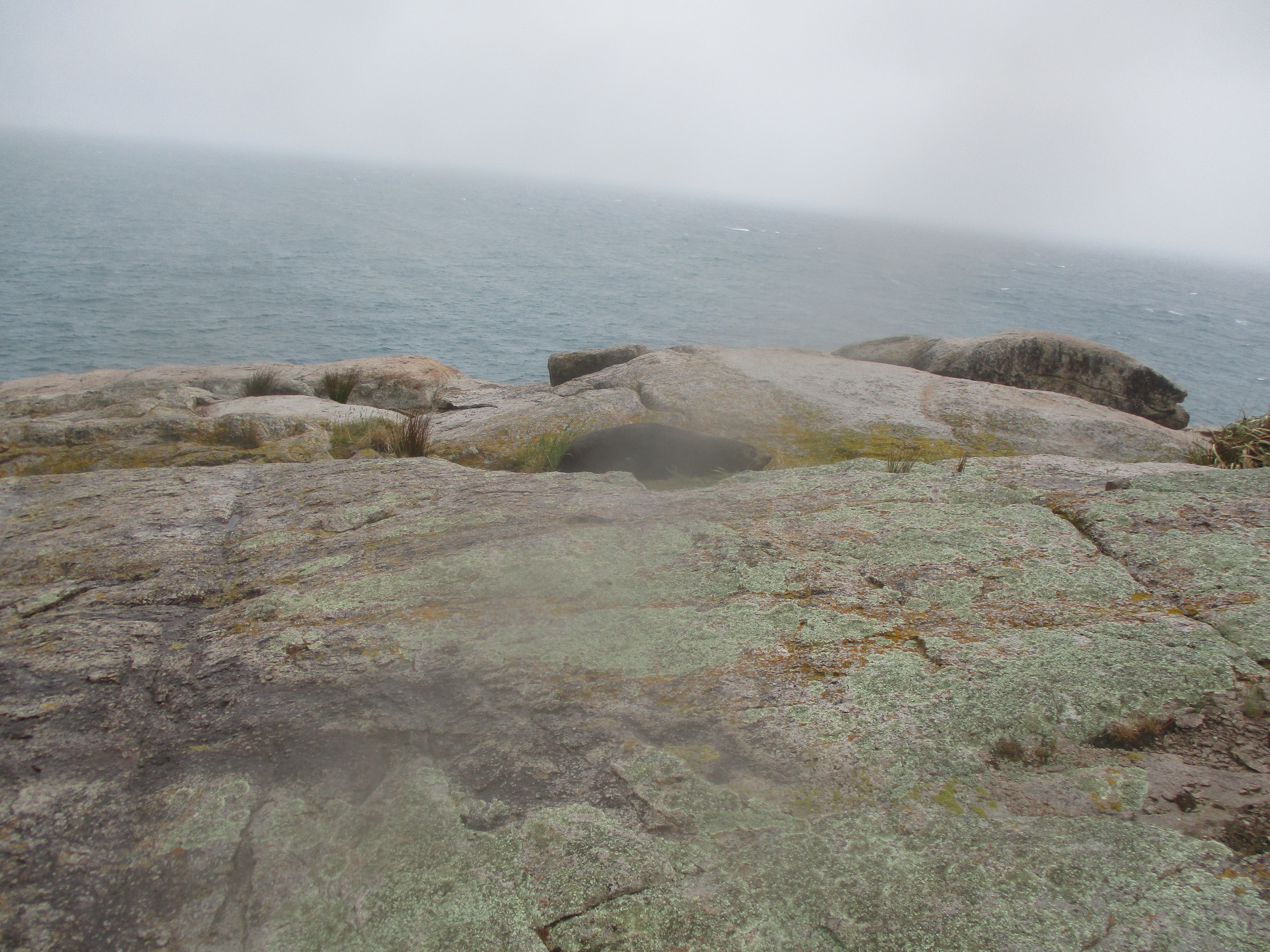

==== Project Janszoon ====
In 2012 Project Janszoon, a privately funded trust, was set up to restore the park's ecosystems. The trust takes its name from Tasman's middle name Janszoon. It is aiming to complete the restoration in time for the 400th anniversary of Tasman's visit and the park's 100th anniversary in 2042.

The Department of Conservation and Project Janszoon developed a free virtual visitor centre for downloading to smartphones or tablets. The application provides information about the Park's history, its flora and fauna, points of interest, weather, walking tracks, and tides. This virtual visitor centre is free of charge and can be found through the App Store or Google Play Store.

== See also ==
- Forest parks of New Zealand
- Regional parks of New Zealand
- Protected areas of New Zealand
- Conservation in New Zealand
