= Awaroa Inlet =

Inlet in Tasman Region, New Zealand

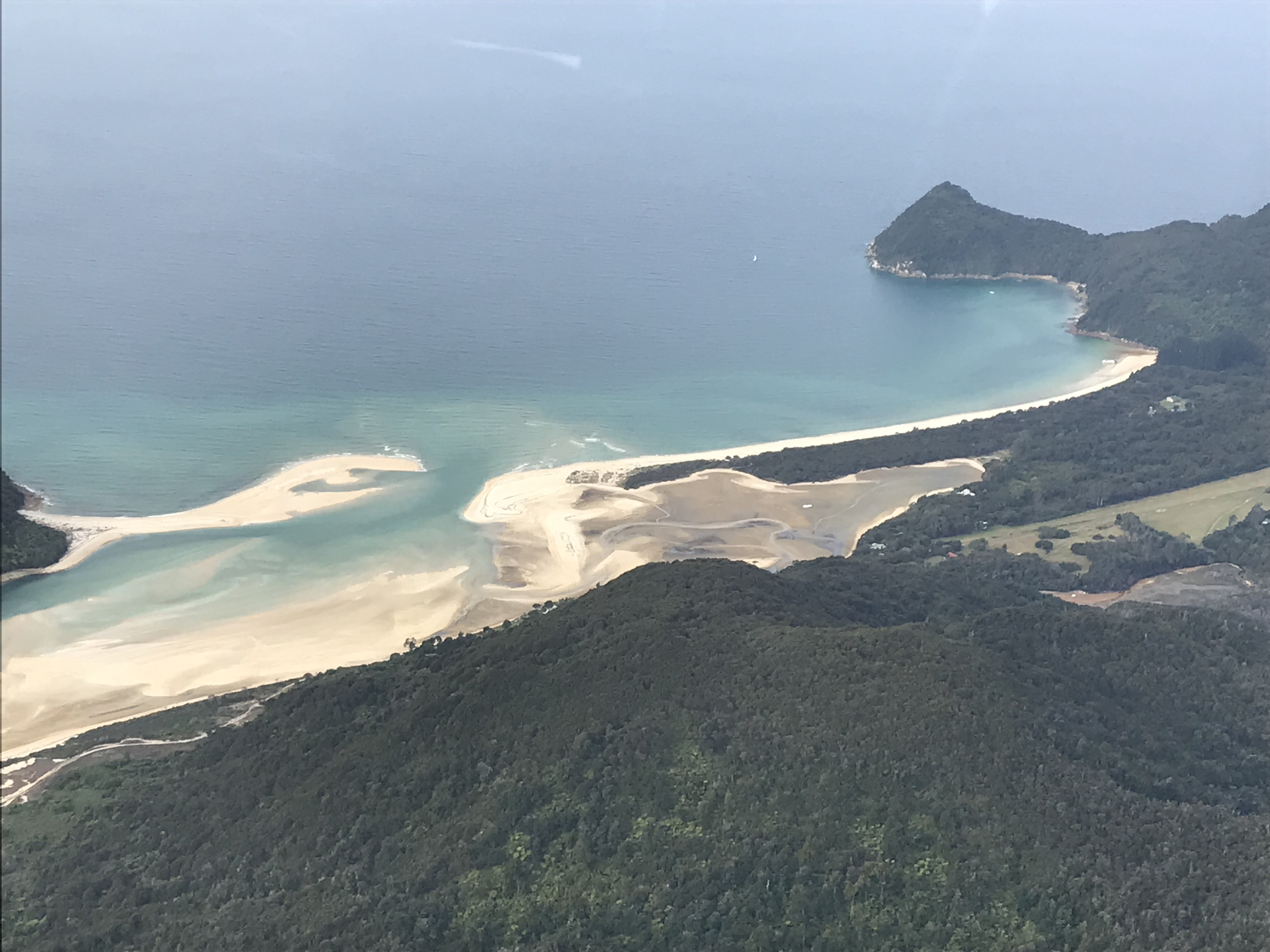
- Awaroa Inlet from the air

- Location of Awaroa Inlet
- Location: Tasman Bay
- Coordinates: 40°52′47.17″S 173°1′3.34″E
- Etymology: From Māori awa: river or valley; roa: long
- Part of: Abel Tasman National Park

Awaroa Inlet
Awaroa Inlet in Tasman Bay

Awaroa Inlet is a remote, alluring body of water within the Abel Tasman National Park, at the northern end of Tasman Bay, in the Tasman Region of the South Island, New Zealand.

In 2016, Awaroa Beach became known as the "People's Beach" after New Zealanders bought it through a crowdfunding campaign.

== Naming ==
Awaroa is a Māori language term (awa meaning river or valley, and roa meaning long). In other words, it is a long river. It is one of many places named Awaroa in New Zealand, for example, Awaroa /Godley Head in Lyttelton Harbour and Awaroa River in the Northland Region.

== Access ==
Access is not easy. Some people arrive on foot along the Abel Tasman Track. Other people come to Awaroa Beach by boat, kayak and water taxi, or to the north west upper reaches via a winding road, or on small planes or helicopter to the airstrip near Awaroa Lodge.

== #buythisbeachNZ campaign ==
Although located within the Abel Tasman National Park, a part of Awaroa Beach remained in private ownership up until 2016.

Michael Spackman had purchased 7 hectares (17 acres) from Joff Colin and Joan Benge around 10 years prior, who had purchased it from the Harwood family in the 1960s who owned it from around 1938.

When Spackman put it up for tender there were no guarantees that next owner would allow public access to the pristine beach. Interested buyers proposed to build upmarket homes on it.

This spurred a crowdfunding campaign to put it back into the public's hands. Christchurch resident Duane Major, and his brother-in-law, Adam Gardner, created an online Givealittle page. More than 33,500 kind-hearted people pledged $5 here, $10 here, $20 there, to raise NZ$2 million.

The campaign heralded an historic shift in the national psyche towards nature conservation and a willingness of New Zealanders with disposable income to protect land for public use.

It was not without controversy though. When philanthropist economist Gareth Morgan, who owned a holiday house nearby, offered to top up the fund with NZ$1 million if his family had use of part of the beach, the backlash was swift. Pledgers threatened to withdraw their pledges and Morgan backed out.

The beach was adopted into the national park and is now managed by the Department of Conservation (New Zealand).

== Local places ==
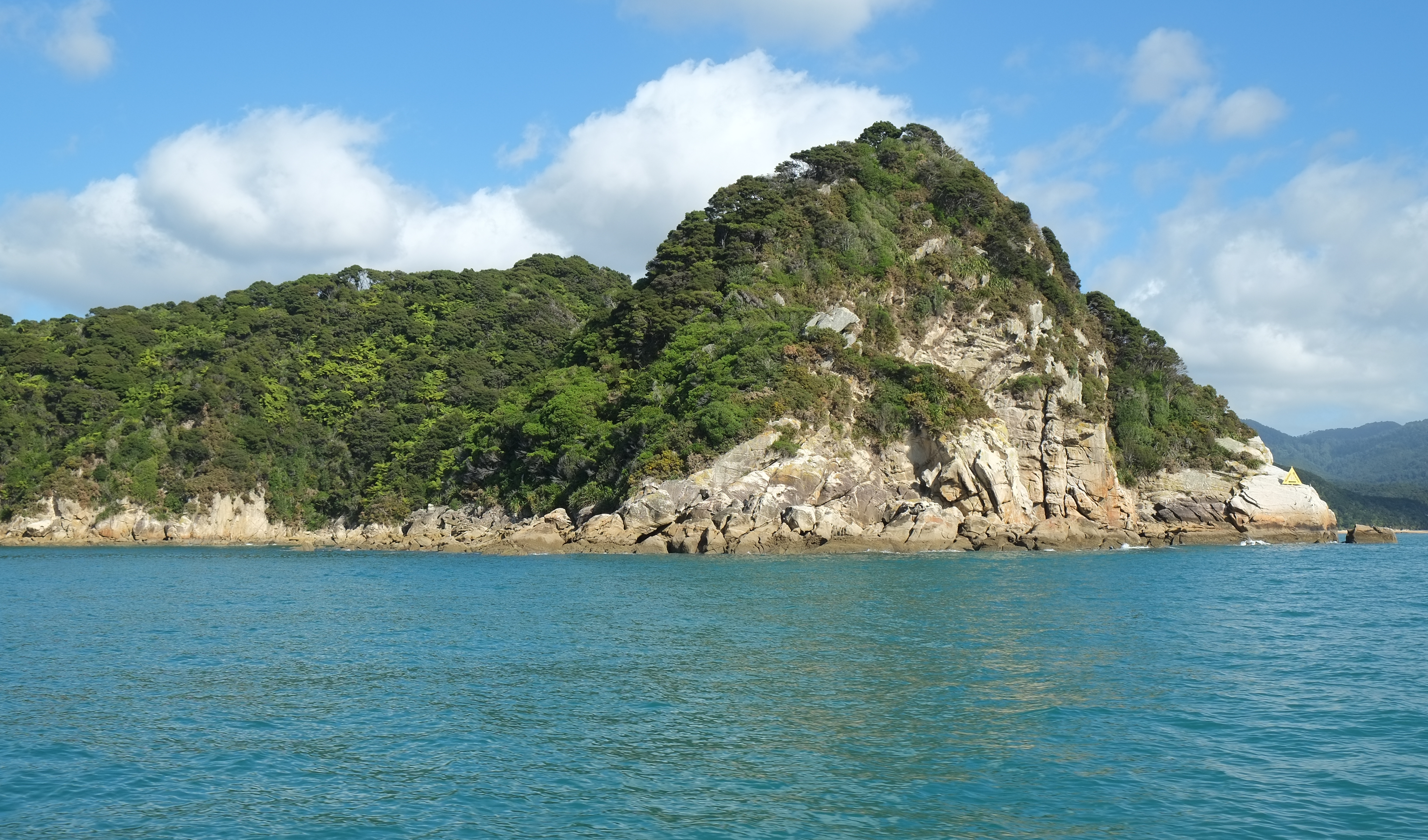
Awaroa Head

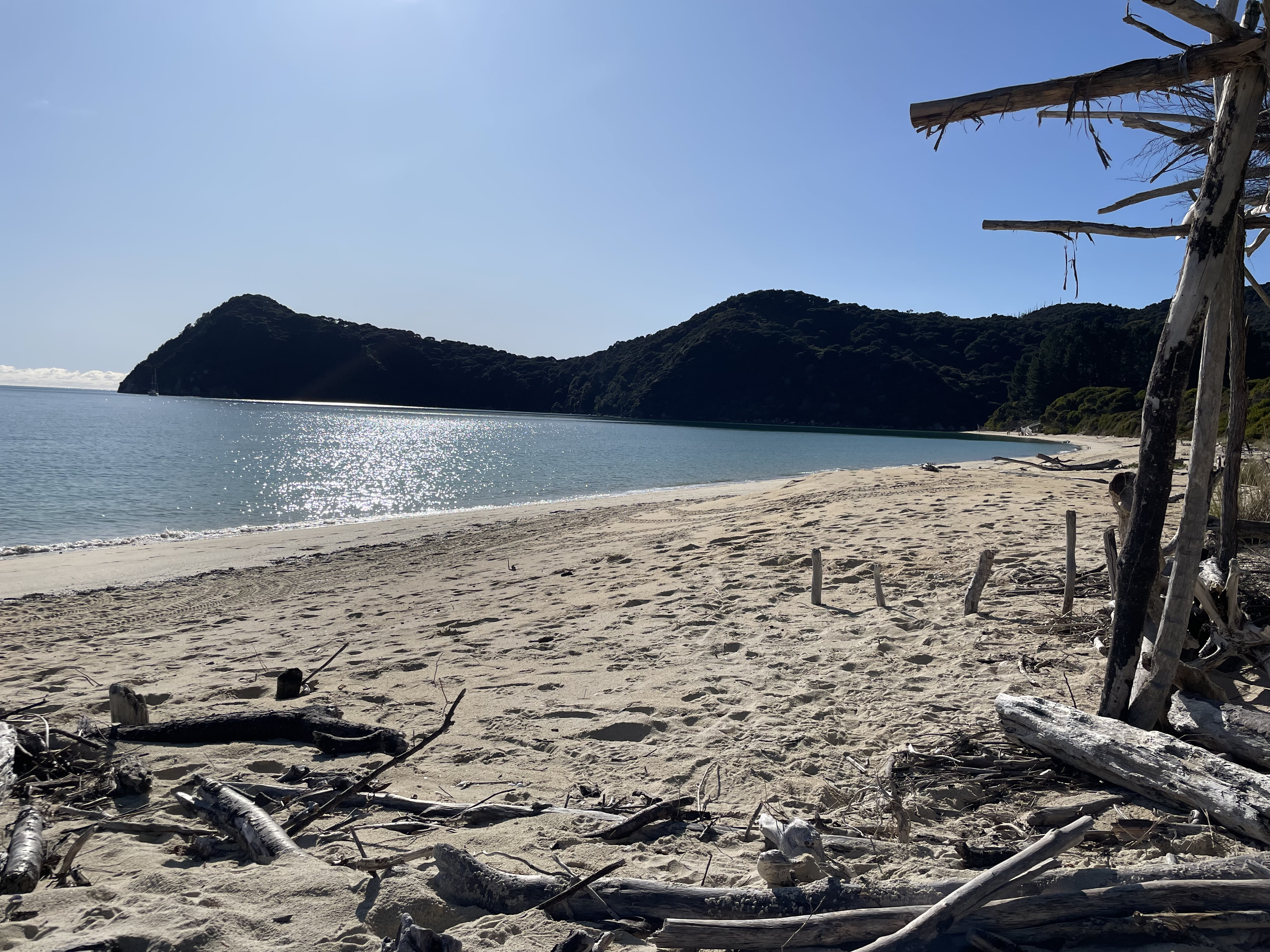
Awaroa Bay

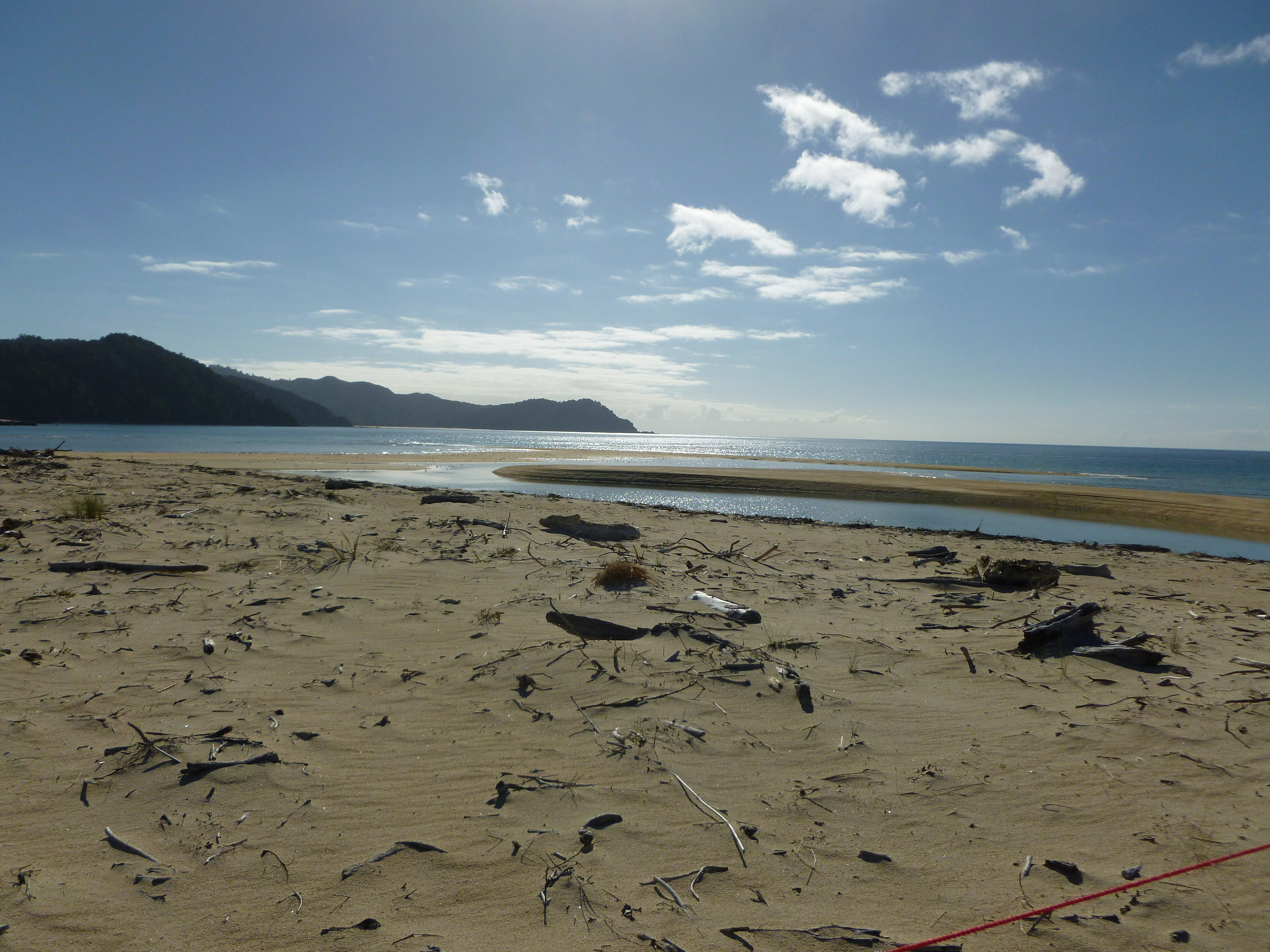
Entrance to Awaroa Inlet

=== Awaroa Head ===
Awaroa Head, at the southern entrance to the Awaroa Bay, is one of the park's impressive granite headlands. It also marks the northern end of the Tonga Island Marine Reserve. The marine reserve was established in November 1993 to protect marine ecology.

=== Awaroa Bay ===
Small boats can anchor in the eastern corner of the bay. Care must be taken to avoid off-lying rocks but there is good holding and shelter from easterly and southerly winds.

=== Awaroa Beach ===
The shoreline stretches 800 metres (2,600 ft), in a gentle arc of golden sand.

=== Awaroa Lodge ===
The lodge is one of the few private accommodation options within the park. It began life as a café and backpackers in the early 1990s.

=== Awaroa Hut ===
This is one of the track huts and campsites. There are 34 bunks in the hut and space for 100 campers. Bookings are made through the Department of Conservation.

=== Awaroa Inlet ===
The inlet is a tidal estuary. It can be crossed on foot two hours either side of low tide.

Its entrance is notable for its long sandspit, shifting channels and a maze of golden sand banks that cover and uncover with the tides. Local knowledge is needed to enter and leave the inlet at high water.

In the 1960s, holiday houses were built on an old farm, and an airstrip put in.

=== Awaroa Saddle ===
This pass on the northern side of the bay is 224 metres (735 ft) above sea level.

=== Awaroa River ===
This river flows into the inlet. One of its tributaries, Venture Creek, once had a small beech bark processing settlement. It was abandoned as the value of the bark declined and the cost of transport increased into the remote area. The creek is named for the scow Venture, once used to ferry goods around the coasts, now a wrecked and barely visible on the tidal flats.

=== Hadfield Clearing ===
The Hadfield family settled and farmed near the mouth of the inlet from 1863, drawn there by the fresh water, good shelter and flat land, easy to clear and ready to fatten sheep and milking cows. Awapoto River flows through the clearing.

In the decades that followed, the Cunliffe, Winter and other families joined the Hadfield's and began to farm the area.

In November 2006, the Hadfield family offered the clearing to the Department of Conservation, thus this significant tract of private land became incorporated into the park.

Today, as part of Project Janszoon, the clearing is a regenerating wetland. Distinct patches of fern, sphagnum moss and other swamp plants can be seen, along with fernbirds and pāteke.

=== Old Awaroa School ===
By 1890, there were enough settler's children to start a school, but the roll declined, and didn't reopen after the 1931 Christmas break. The school site and surrounding farmland was formally taken into the park in the 1950s.

A park ranger stumbled across the overgrown school in 1961.

“Crossing the threshold was just like taking a backwards step through time of some 30 or 40 years,” the ranger said. Lessons were still chalked on the blackboard, paintings done by the children hung on the walls, workbooks, pencils and slates lay on the desks and there was a thick coating of dust over everything. “It all looked exactly as if they had all walked out at the end of lessons one day years ago and had never come back.” Dawber, Carol (1999). Awaroa Legacy. Picton, NZ: River Press. p. 332. ISBN 0-9598041-6-1.

Vandals burnt down the little schoolhouse in 1969, and all that remains is fireplace and some twisted iron.

=== Old Steam Engine ===
Short side tracks to both the schoolhouse site and a steam traction engine used for skidding out logs are both signposted off the main track through the upper inlet.

=== Awaroa Carpark ===
A rough carpark at the dead end of a tortuously winding narrow road at the lonely western corner of Awaroa Inlet.
