= Theodor Eyrich =

Danish rower

Personal information
- Nationality: Danish
- Born: 29 May 1893; Copenhagen, Denmark
- Died: 9 October 1979 (aged 86); Helleruplund, Denmark

Sport
- Sport: Rowing

Theodor Eyrich (29 May 1893 – 9 October 1979) was a Danish rower. He competed at the 1912 Summer Olympics and the 1920 Summer Olympics.
