= Max Schmid =

Swiss rower

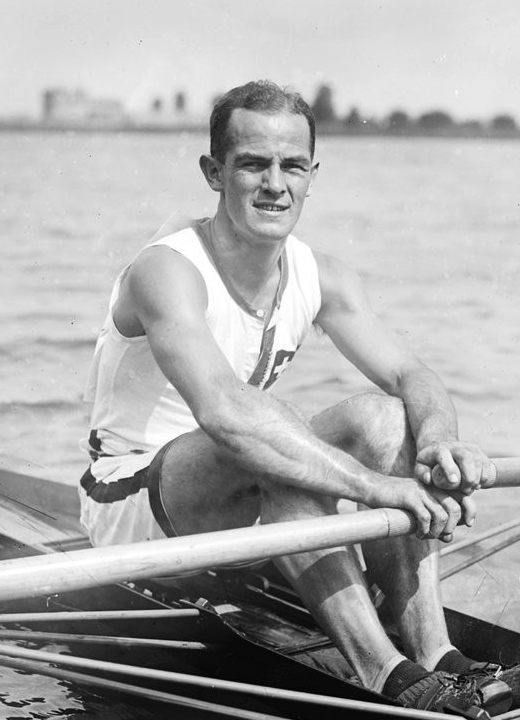
- Max Schmid at the 1920 European Championships

Personal information
- Died: January 1964

Sport
- Sport: Rowing
Medal record
Representing Switzerland
European Rowing Championships
Gold medal – first place	1920 Mâcon	Single sculls
Silver medal – second place	1925 Prague	Double sculls

Max W. Schmid (died January 1964) was a Swiss rower who won the single scull event at the 1920 European Championships. He competed at the 1920 Summer Olympics but failed to reach the final. In 1925, he won a European silver medal in the double sculls, together with Rudolf Bosshard.
