= Motuareronui / Adele Island =

Island in New Zealand

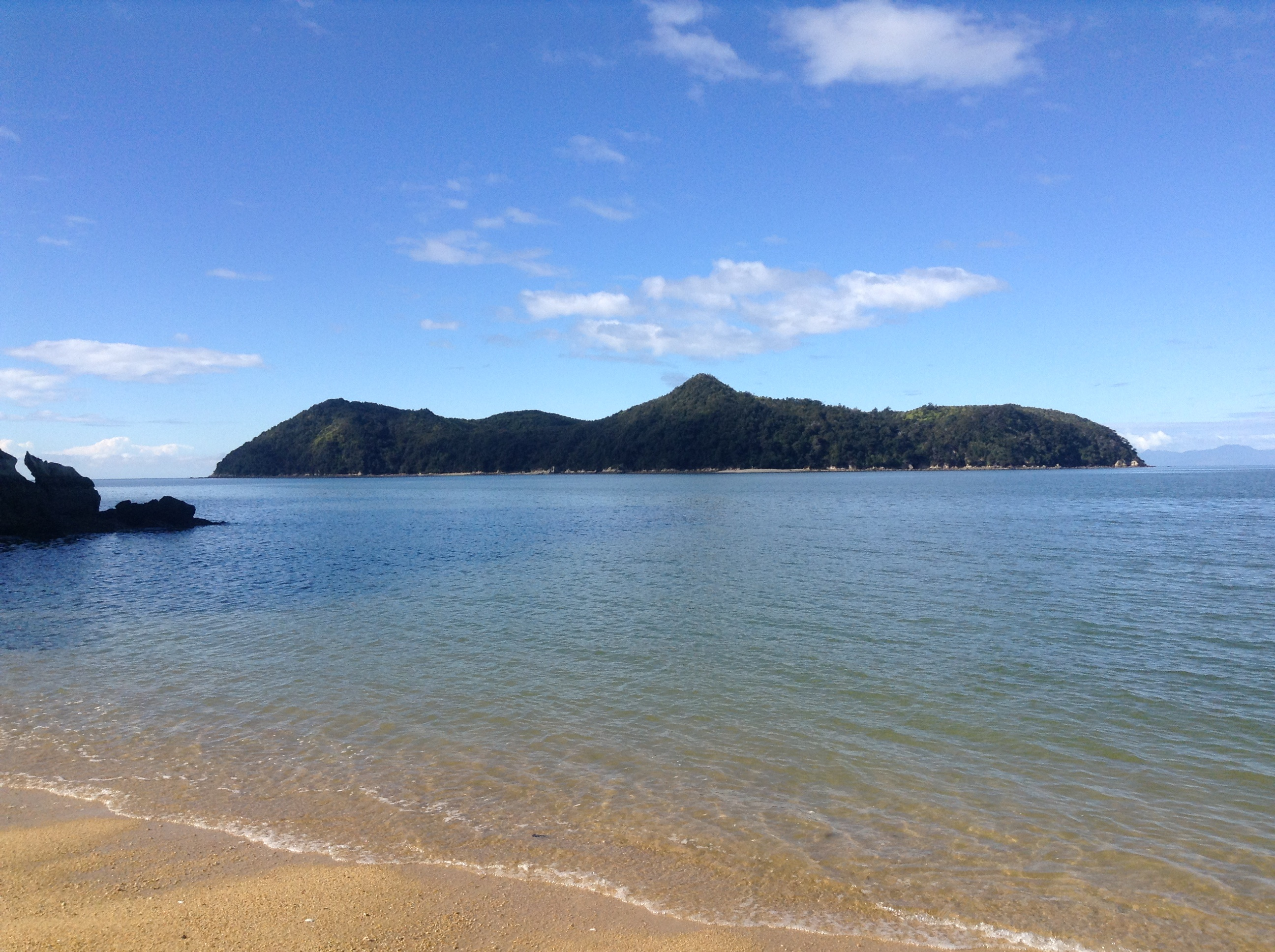

- Location within New Zealand

Geography
- Location: Tasman Bay / Te Tai-o-Aorere, New Zealand
- Coordinates: 40°58′50″S 173°03′33″E
- Adjacent to: Tasman Bay
- Total islands: 1
- Length: 1.5 km (0.93 mi)
- Width: 1.1 km (0.68 mi)
- Highest elevation: 119 m (390 ft)

Administration
- New Zealand
- Department of Conservation

Demographics
- Population: 0

Motuareronui / Adele Island is a small island off the coast of the South Island of New Zealand. It is contained within Abel Tasman National Park. The navigator and botanist Jules Dumont d'Urville charted the island in 1827.

In the 1850s, the island and nearby Fisherman Island were purchased by a Nelson customs collector, but were later confiscated by the government due to misuse of funds. Both islands became scenic reserves in 1895.

These islands shelter the waterway known as the Astrolabe Roadstead from Tasman Bay / Te Tai-o-Aorere, making it popular with kayakers and boaties.

== Etymology ==
Dumont d'Urville named the island after his wife Adèle Pépin, and also named the adjacent Fisherman Island, along with the Astrolabe Roadstead, which he named after his ship, the Astrolabe.

In August 2014, the island name was officially altered to Motuareronui / Adele Island. Motu means island, arero is a tongue and nui is big; hence, Motuareronui literally means the big island shaped like a tongue, which makes Motuareroiti / Fisherman Island (with iti meaning little) the little island shaped like a tongue; however, in his comprehensive book on natural and cultural history of Abel Tasman National Park, Philip Simpson suggests the two islands are incorrectly named, as follows:

Tongues (arero) are important to Māori culture... the islands are not, however, noticeable tongue shaped. A recent official change as a result of the Treaty settlement is that Tasman Bay is shared with Te Tai o Aorere. This supports the suggestion that the two islands are incorrectly named and should be Motuaorerenui and Motuaorereiti.
