= Simonet Creek =

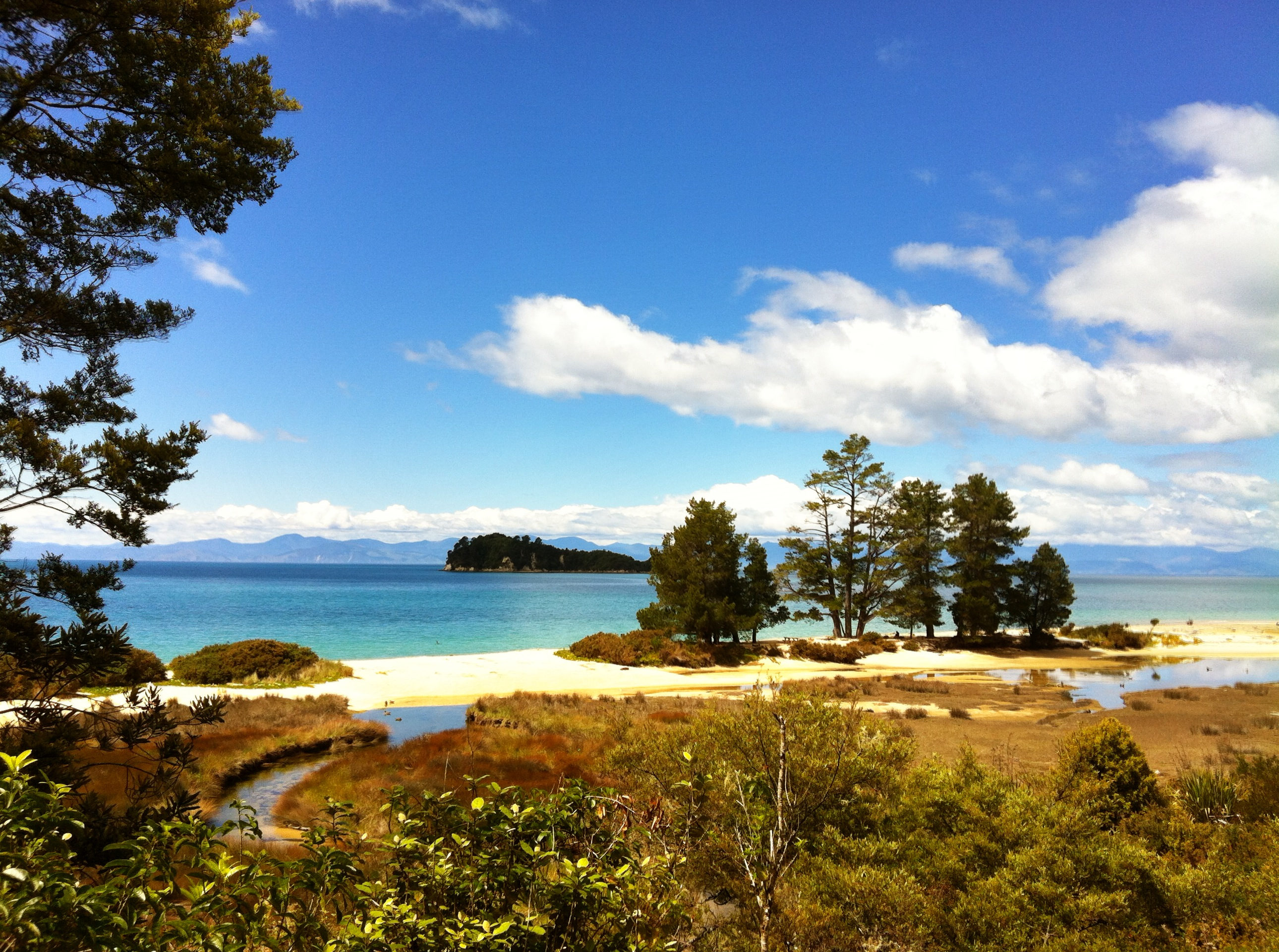
- Mouth of Simonet Creek as it enters Apple Tree Bay
- Route of the Simonet Creek
- Mouth of the Simonet Creek Simonet Creek (South Island)

Location
- Country: New Zealand

Physical characteristics
- Source
  - coordinates: 40°57′56″S 173°01′03″E
- Mouth
  - location: Apple Tree Bay
  - coordinates: 40°58′56″S 173°02′13″E
  - elevation: 0 metres (0 ft)

Basin features
- Progression: Simonet Creek → Apple Tree Bay → Tasman Bay → Tasman Sea

Simonet Creek is a river which flows through the Abel Tasman National Park in the north of the South Island of New Zealand.

The creek start in the hills of the park and empties into the Tasman Sea approximately 3.5 kilometres (2.2 mi) from Mārahau and the start of the Abel Tasman Coast Track which it flows underneath near to Apple Tree Bay.
