= Abel Tasman Coast Track =

Hiking trail in Tasman Region, New Zealand

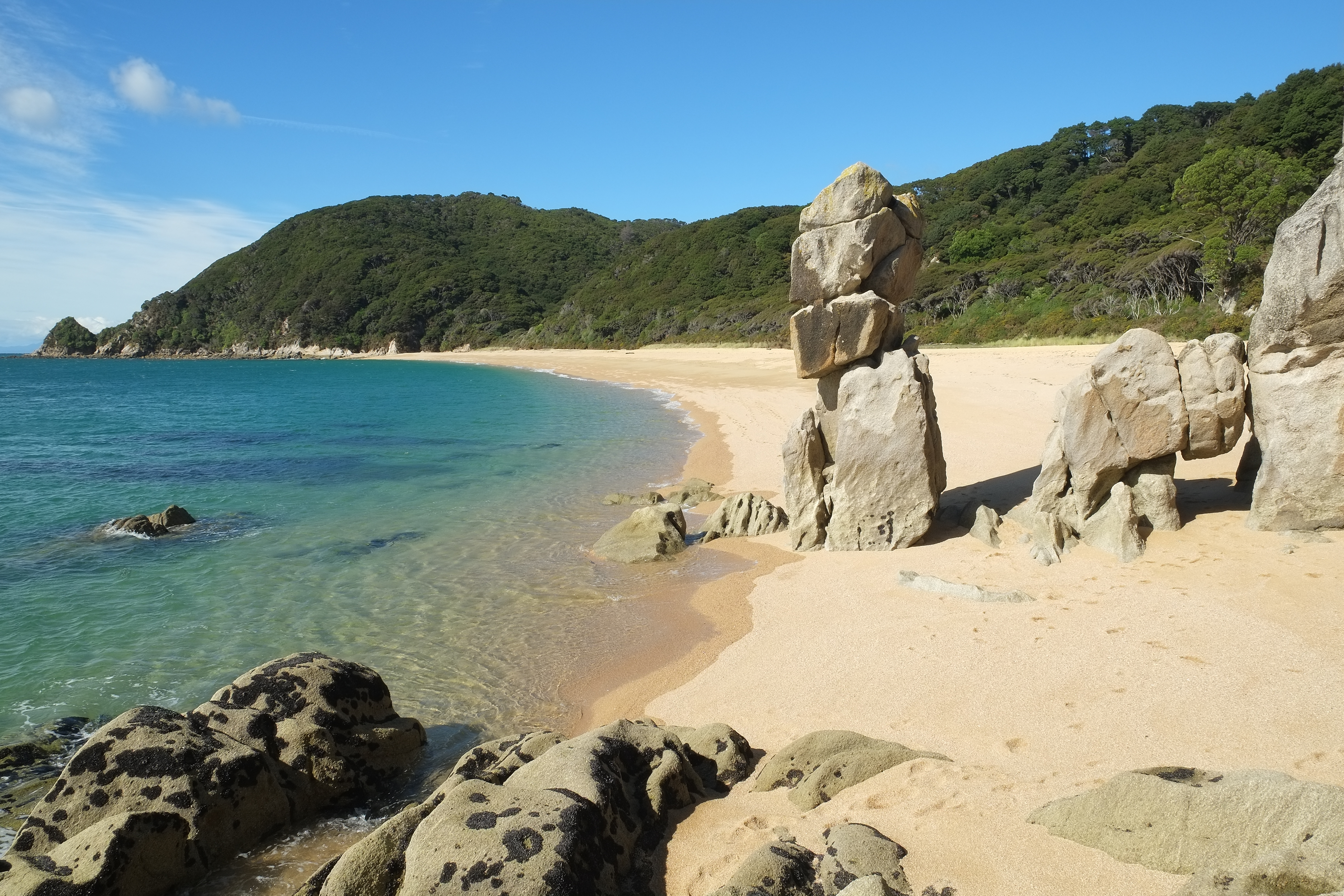
- Anapai Bay, one of many beaches along the track
- Length: 60 km (37 mi)
- Location: Abel Tasman National Park, New Zealand
- Designation: New Zealand Great Walk
- Trailheads: Mārahau, Wainui Bay
- Use: Tramping
- Highest point: Saddle close to Wainui Bay 200 m (660 ft)
- Lowest point: 0 m (0 ft)
- Difficulty: Easy
- Season: All year
- Sights: Sandy beaches, lush coastal native bush, tidal estuaries and wetlands
- Hazards: Tidal estuary crossings
- Surface: Dirt, sand
- Website: www.doc.govt.nz/parks-and-recreation/places-to-go/nelson-tasman/places/abel-tasman-national-park/things-to-do/tracks/abel-tasman-coast-track

The Abel Tasman Coast Track is a 60 kilometres (37 mi) long walking track within the Abel Tasman National Park in New Zealand. It extends from Mārahau in the south to Wainui in the north, with many side tracks. It is one of two main tracks through the park, the other being the Abel Tasman Inland Track, which stretches for 38 km between Tinline Bay and Torrent Bay off the main coastal track. The coastal track is well sheltered, and with mild weather in all seasons, it is accessible and open throughout the year.

As one of the New Zealand Department of Conservation (DOC) Great Walks, the coastal track is well formed and easy to follow. It is the most popular tramping track in New Zealand, with most of the approximately 200,000 visitors to Abel Tasman National Park walking at least part of the track. It can be walked independently or with commercial operators with guiding, camping, lodge stay and boat stay options. Following a protected coastline, many people combine walking and sea kayaking in Abel Tasman National Park.

To walk the entire track takes from 3 to 5 days. Single-day walks are popular, as many points are accessible by boat from beaches along the track. The only road access other than the start and end points, is at Tōtaranui. Commercial water taxi and boat operators operate on a published schedule, and provide pick-up and drop-off services between Mārahau and Tōtaranui. One of the most popular sections for walkers with limited time is from Bark Bay to Torrent Bay (or vice versa), a distance of 7.8 kilometres, which incorporates some steep paths, beautiful views over the two bays and a crossing of the Falls River by a 47 m swing bridge.

To stay overnight in the National Park, visitors must use officially designated accommodation. Independent travellers use DOC campsites and huts that must be reserved in advance during the most popular months. A small number of commercial properties occupy parcels of private land within the boundaries of the National Park and provide lodge-style accommodation. Some backpacker accommodation is provided by boats moored off the coast.

With one of the largest tidal ranges in New Zealand, the coastal track includes some tidal crossings that can only be negotiated at low tide. Independent walkers and sea kayakers need to have information on tides in the area to plan their trips.

== Description ==
For walking the entire Abel Tasman Coast Track, the track can be divided into five sections by the locations where huts are provided: Anchorage Bay, Bark Bay, Awaroa Inlet and Whariwharangi Bay. Between Mārahau and Tōtaranui, several more access points by water taxi, such as at Torrent Bay and Onetahuti Bay, make it possible to walk only parts of each section at a time for walks from less than an hour to half-day and day walks.

=== Mārahau to Anchorage Bay ===
Mārahau is generally considered the starting point of the Abel Tasman Coast Track and is the only settlement along the track. Mārahau provides a DOC information centre, small shops, and holiday accommodation.

The first 12.4 km section to Anchorage Bay takes in the estuary of the Mārahau River before passing several small bays and offering views out to Fisherman Island and Adele Island. Along the way, the bays of Tinline Bay, Coquille Bay, Apple Tree Bay, Akersten Bay, and Watering Cove provide limited campsites and sandy beaches. After Watering Cove, the track turns inland for about one kilometer before it reaches Anchorage Bay. The hut and campsite at Anchorage is the largest along the track and like the other locations with huts provides filtered drinking water. A popular short side track from Anchorage leads to the Cleopatra's Pool, a natural rock pool with a moss-lined waterslide.

=== Anchorage Bay to Bark Bay ===
At Torrent Bay, the track crosses the first of three estuaries. The Torrent Bay estuary can either be crossed within 2 hours either side of low tide, or rounded by an alternative high tide track through the bush around the bay, lengthening the distance by 3 km. The 8.4 km section between Anchorage Bay and Bark Bay leads largely inland through coastal forest, but the terrain of the valleys it crosses remains gentle.

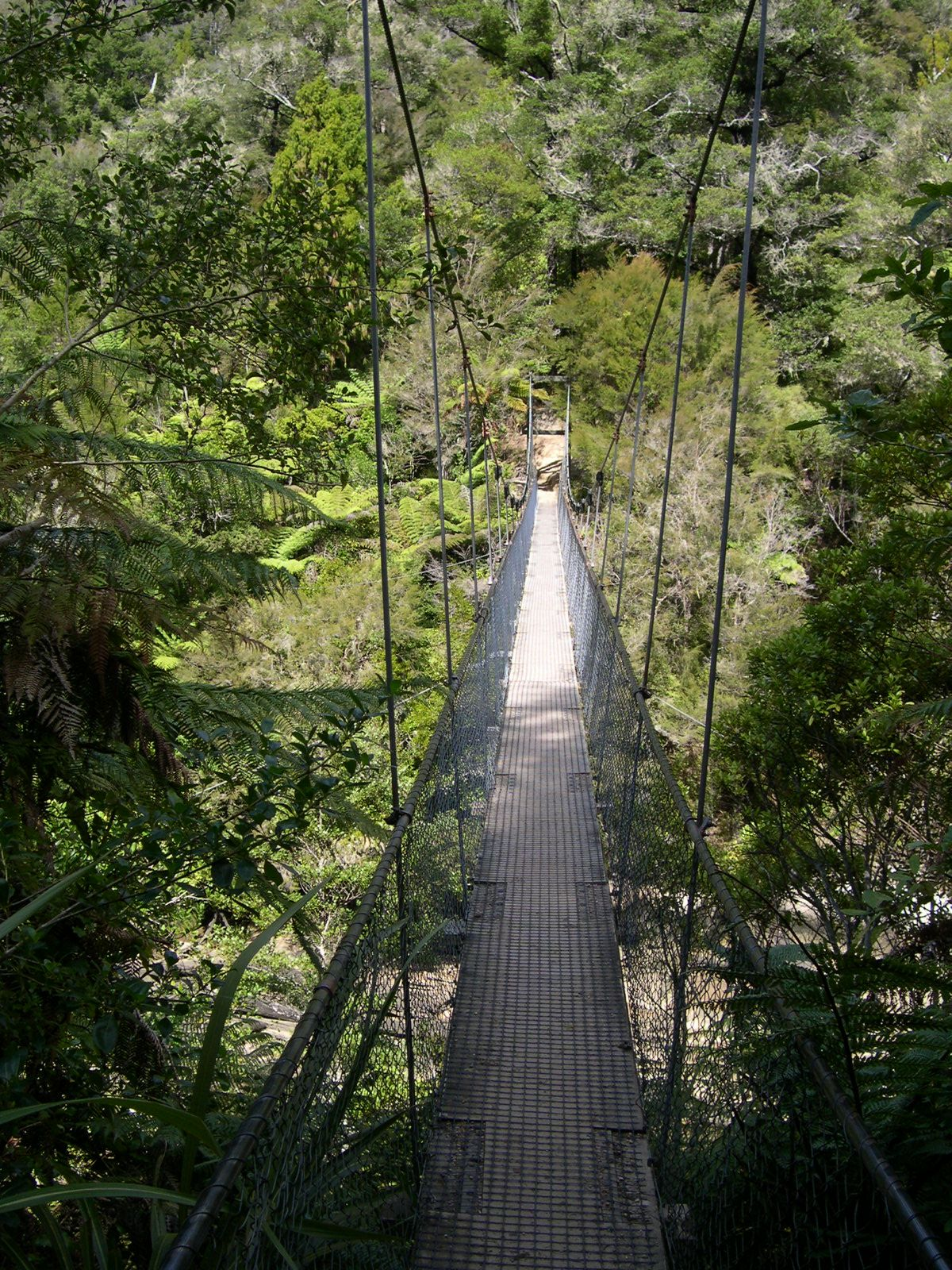
Swing bridge over Falls River

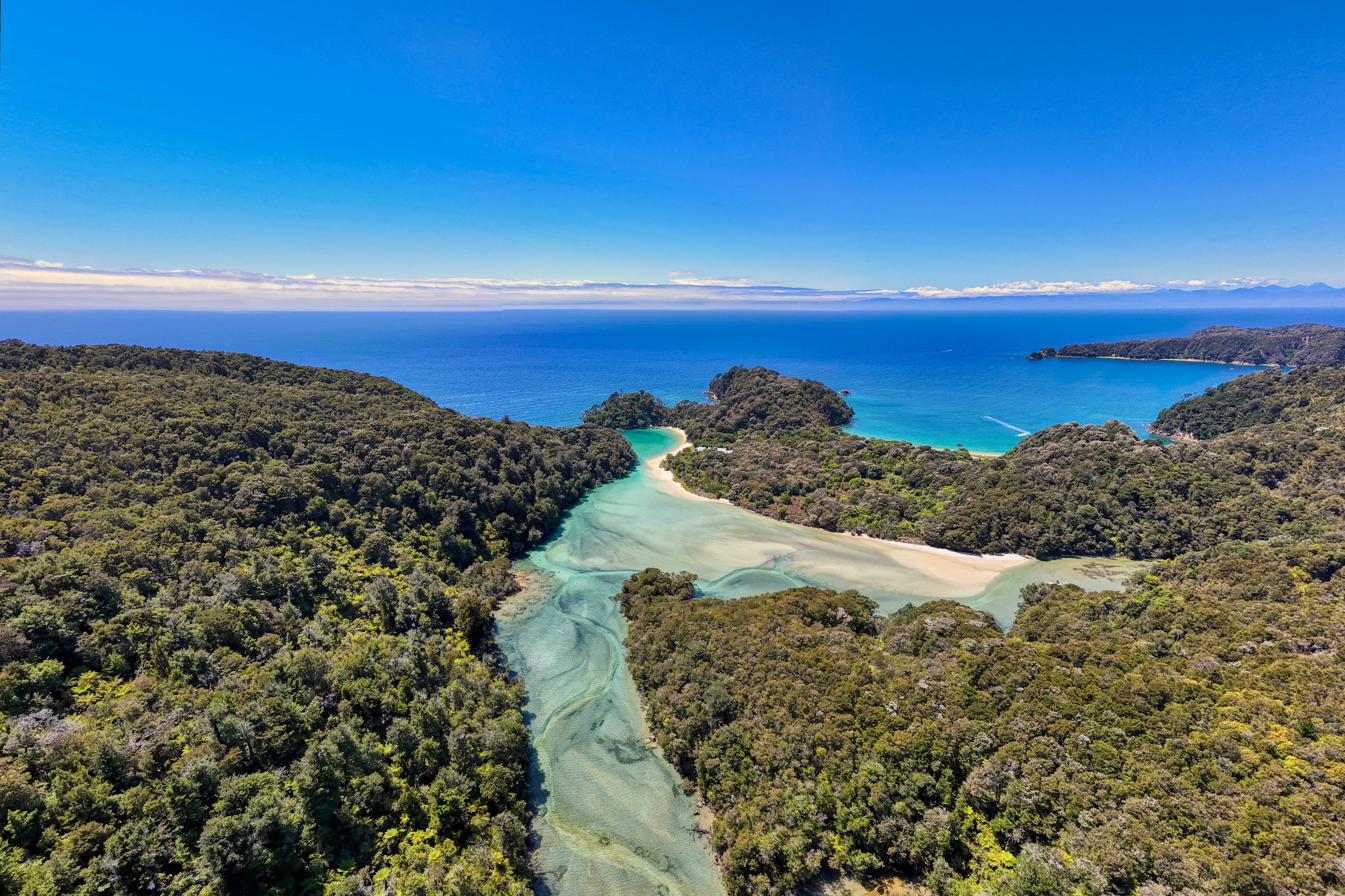
Frenchman Bay

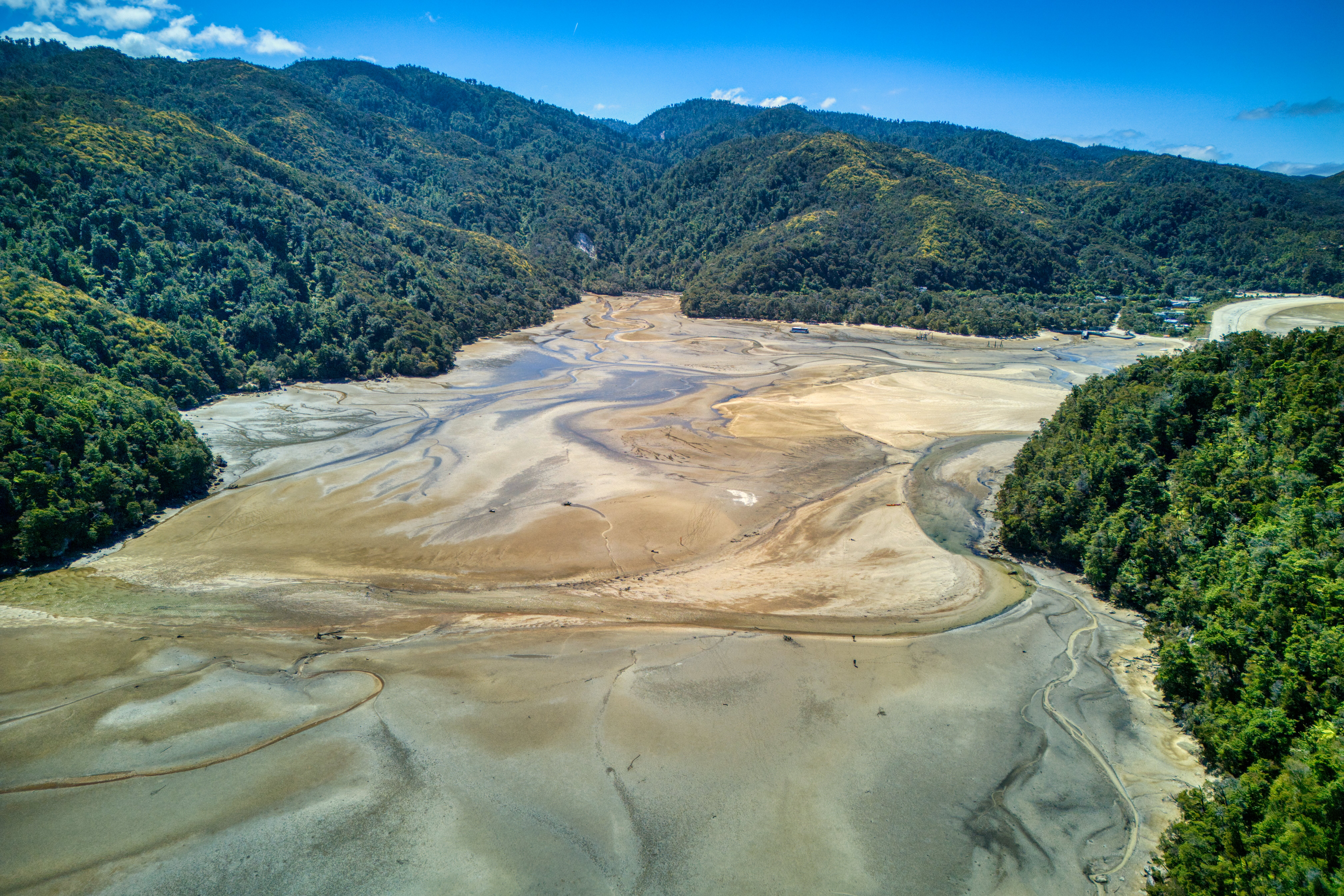
The Torrent Bay estuary in low tide

=== Bark Bay to Awaroa Inlet ===
The 13.5 km section from Bark Bay to Awaroa Inlet takes in the coast backing the Tonga Island Marine Reserve, but continues largely through manuka forest with no sea views. Bark Bay contains another tidal estuary, however, the provided all-tide track around it only adds 15 minutes.

At the halfway point, the Abel Tasman Coast Track briefly returns to the coast and runs along the wide sandy beach of Onetahuti Bay, with views out to Tonga Island. A bridge and boardwalk cross Richardson Stream and the surrounding wetland, before the track gently climbs over Tonga Saddle to Awaroa Bay.

Awaroa Bay extends for over 2 km into Awaroa Inlet, which has a large tidal range and can only be crossed between about 1.5 hours before low tide and 2 hours after low tide. A lodge, hut, and campsite provide a number of accommodation options. The track first passes close to the lodge, with a side track leading to the lodge, before skirting another valley and ending on the sandy beaches of the inlet near Awaroa Hut. The shortcut to the hut and DOC campsite involves crossing a lagoon which at high tide is about wwaist deep, at low tide it can be ankle deep, or you can walk around it in about 10 min. The long way is 1 hr 30 min but avoids getting wet.

=== Awaroa Inlet to Whariwharangi Bay ===
This section of the track is 16.9 kilometres (10.5 mi) long, but can be broken up into 7.1 km to the Tōtaranui camping ground, and 9.8 km from there to Whariwharangi Bay Hut. Campsites are also located along the way at Waiharakeke Bay, Anapai Bay, and Mutton Cove.

Awaroa Inlet can be crossed from anywhere between Sawpit Point and the sandy shore in front of Awaroa Hut. A large orange triangle marker indicates the point where the track continues on the other shore and is clearly visible from across the inlet, which is around 1 km wide at this point. Even at low tide, trampers can expect to get wet feet crossing the sandy expanse of the inlet and its intermittent banks covered in seashells. In the middle of the estuary, Awaroa River meanders its way out to sea. It is generally shallow and can easily be crossed, but may be impassable following very heavy rain.

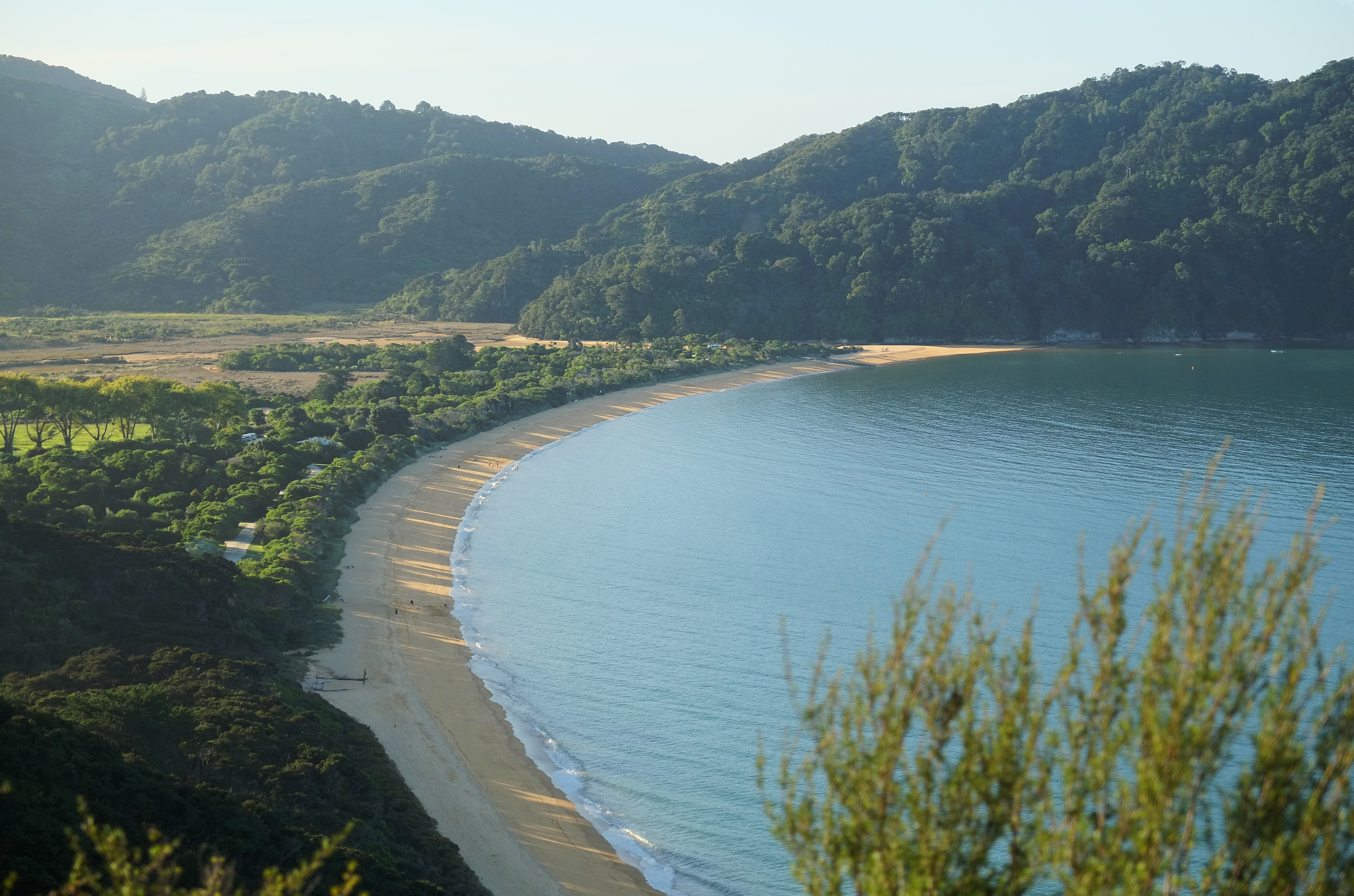
Overlooking Tōtaranui Beach from Skinner Point

North of Awaroa Bay the track crosses a low saddle to Waiharakeke Bay, briefly re-enters the forest, and then takes in Goat Bay. At both Waiharakeke Bay and Goat Bay the path leads along the sandy beaches. Between Goat Bay and Tōtaranui, the track climbs steeply to a lookout above Skinner Point with views north over the wide bay of Tōtaranui.

At Tōtaranui an 11 km gravel road from Wainui Bay provides the only road access point to the Abel Tasman Coast Track, other than the start and end points of the track. The flat land behind the golden sand beach accommodates a camping ground, car park, camp office with public toilets, telephone and drinking water supply, as well as campsites for walkers of the track.

Due to Tōtaranui being the northernmost water taxi stop, the track north of Tōtaranui is less frequented than the sections south of it, but no less scenic. After climbing over another low saddle, the track takes in the sandy beaches of Anapai Bay, with rock stack formations at its northern end, Anatakapau Bay, and Mutton Cove – the latter two separated by cliffs with a small rocky cove in between.

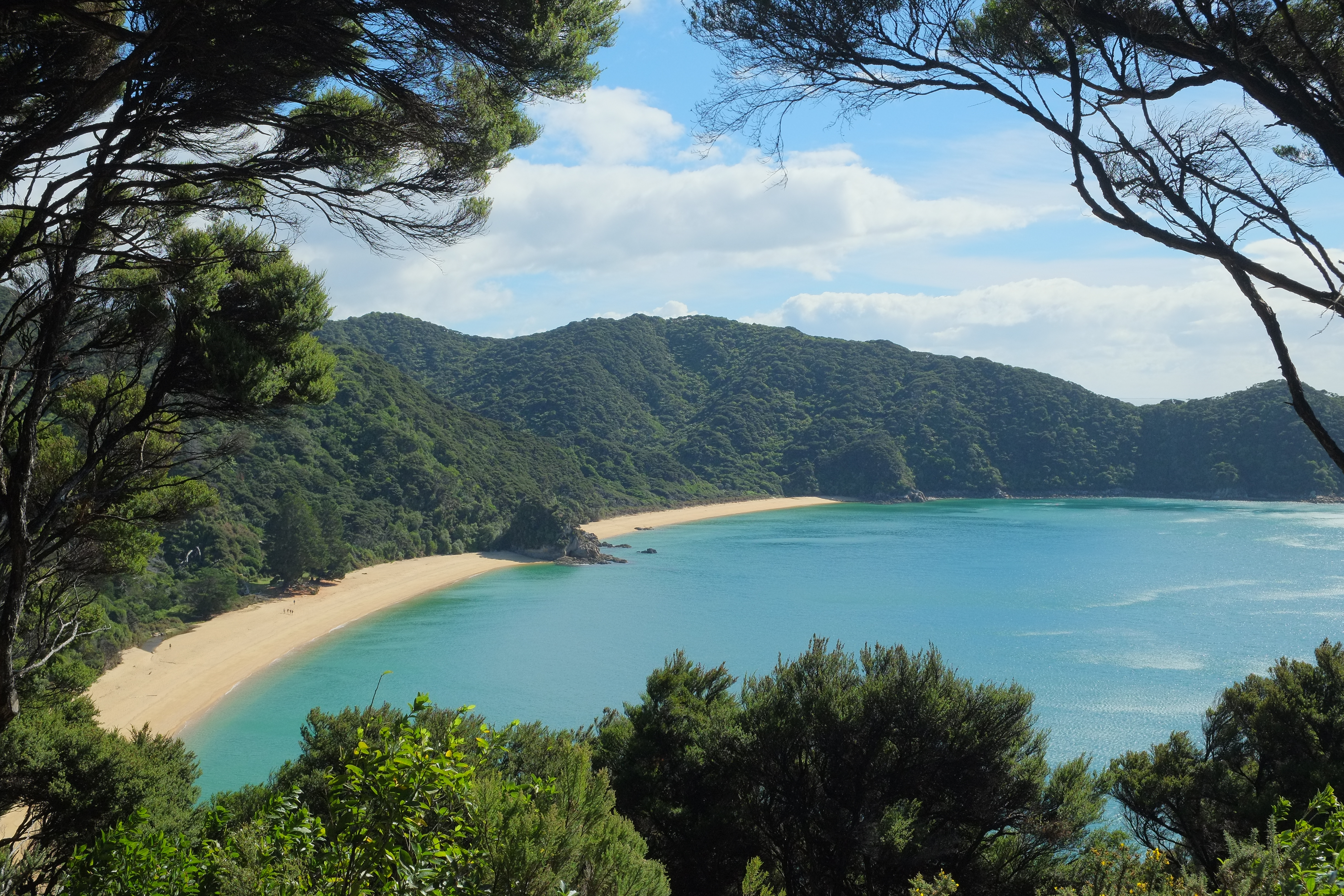
Anatakapau Bay and Mutton Cove

Between Anatakapau Bay and Mutton Cove, the Abel Tasman Coast Track veers west towards Whariwharangi Bay, with a side track continuing north to take in Separation Point. A lighthouse at Separation Point overlooks the cliffs and a seal colony at this northernmost point of the track. Walking via Separation Point adds one hour to the walking time.

Both the main track and the track via Separation Point continue to climb inland over the forested hills to the north-facing Whariwharangi Bay, where a restored farm homestead has been repurposed as the DOC hut, and additional campsites are provided.

=== Whariwharangi Bay to Wainui Bay ===
The last section is the shortest, consisting of a 5.7 km climb out of Whariwharangi Bay and over a saddle to Wainui Bay. Once at the estuary's edge, the track follows the shoreline to a car park. Wainui Inlet itself is not part of the Abel Tasman Coast Track anymore, but can be crossed within two hours either side of low tide.

Mountain biking is not permitted on the Abel Tasman Coast Track, however, from 1 May to 30 September, mountain bikers can ride on the Gibbs Hill track from Tōtaranui to Wainui Bay, with the last 1 km of that track sharing the coastal track.

== Location ==
Point	Coordinates (links to map & photo sources)	Notes
Mārahau	40.9958°S 173.0051°E	Small settlement, DOC office, car park
Anchorage	40.9568°S 173.0572°E	Hut & campsite
Torrent Bay	40.9461°S 173.0489°E	Campsite and private accommodation
Bark Bay	40.9161°S 173.0486°E	Hut & campsite
Onetahuti Bay	40.885°S 173.048°E	Campsite
Awaroa Inlet	40.862°S 173.019°E	Hut & campsite
Tōtaranui	40.8226°S 173.0047°E	Camping ground with road access and car park
Separation Point	40.782°S 172.998°E	Side trip to seal colony
Whariwharangi Bay	40.7865°S 172.975°E	Hut & campsite
Wainui Inlet	40.8095°S 172.9563°E	Road access and car park
