= Wainui River (Tasman) =

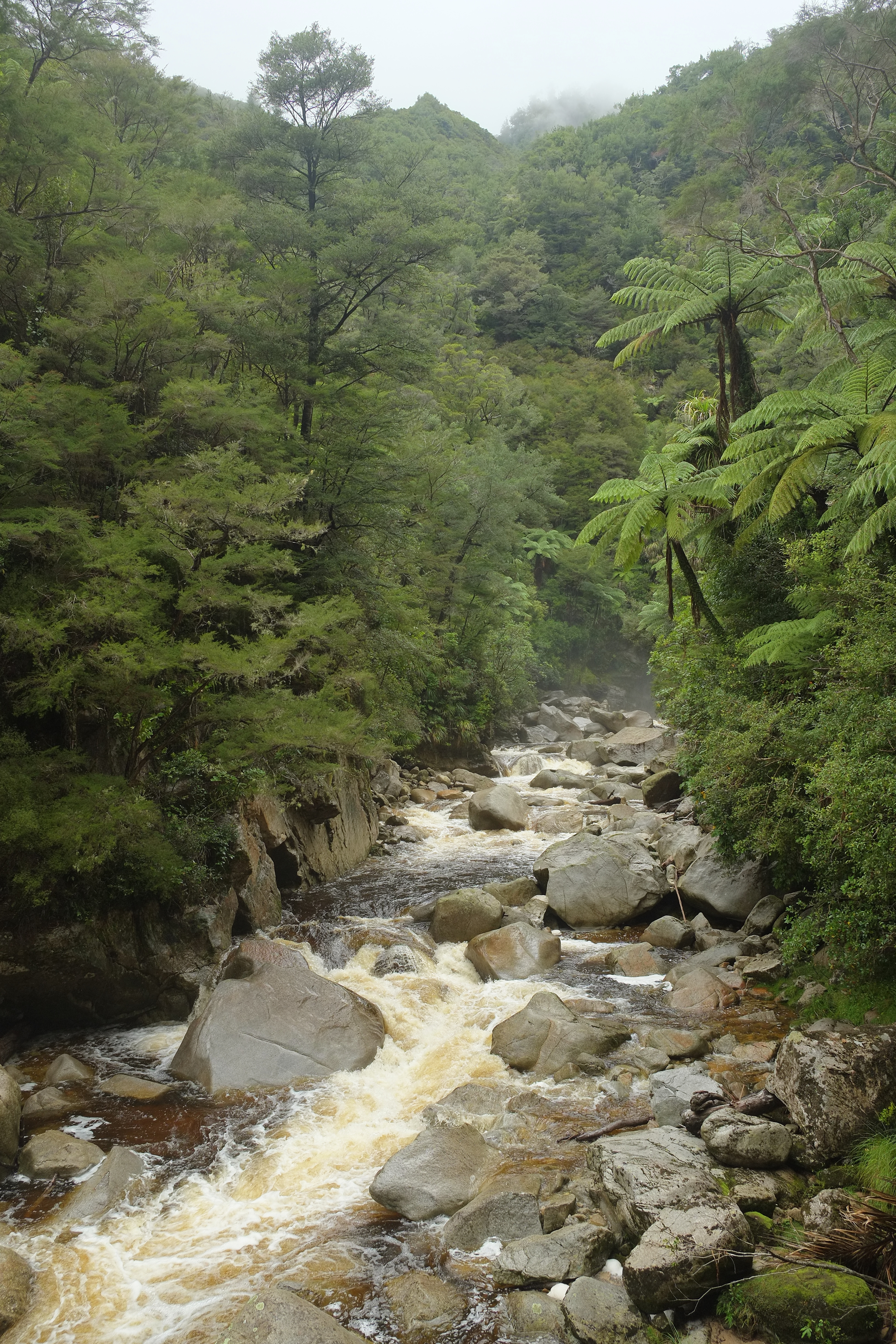
- Wainui River on a rainy day
- Route of the Wainui River
- Mouth of the Wainui River Wainui River (Tasman) (South Island)

Location
- Country: New Zealand

Physical characteristics
- Source
  - coordinates: 40°56′00″S 172°55′29″E
- Mouth
  - location: Wainui Inlet
  - coordinates: 40°49′26″S 172°56′23″E
  - elevation: 0 metres (0 ft)
- Length: 20 km (12 mi)

Basin features
- Progression: Wainui River → Wainui Inlet → Wainui Bay → Tasman Sea
- Waterfalls: Wainui Falls

The Wainui River is a river of the Tasman Region of New Zealand's South Island. Wainui is a Māori language term (wai meaning water, and nui meaning large, expansive) and the umbrella entity for the three local iwi gives a meaning of "where the tidal flow leaves a big expanse of bay empty".

== Geography ==
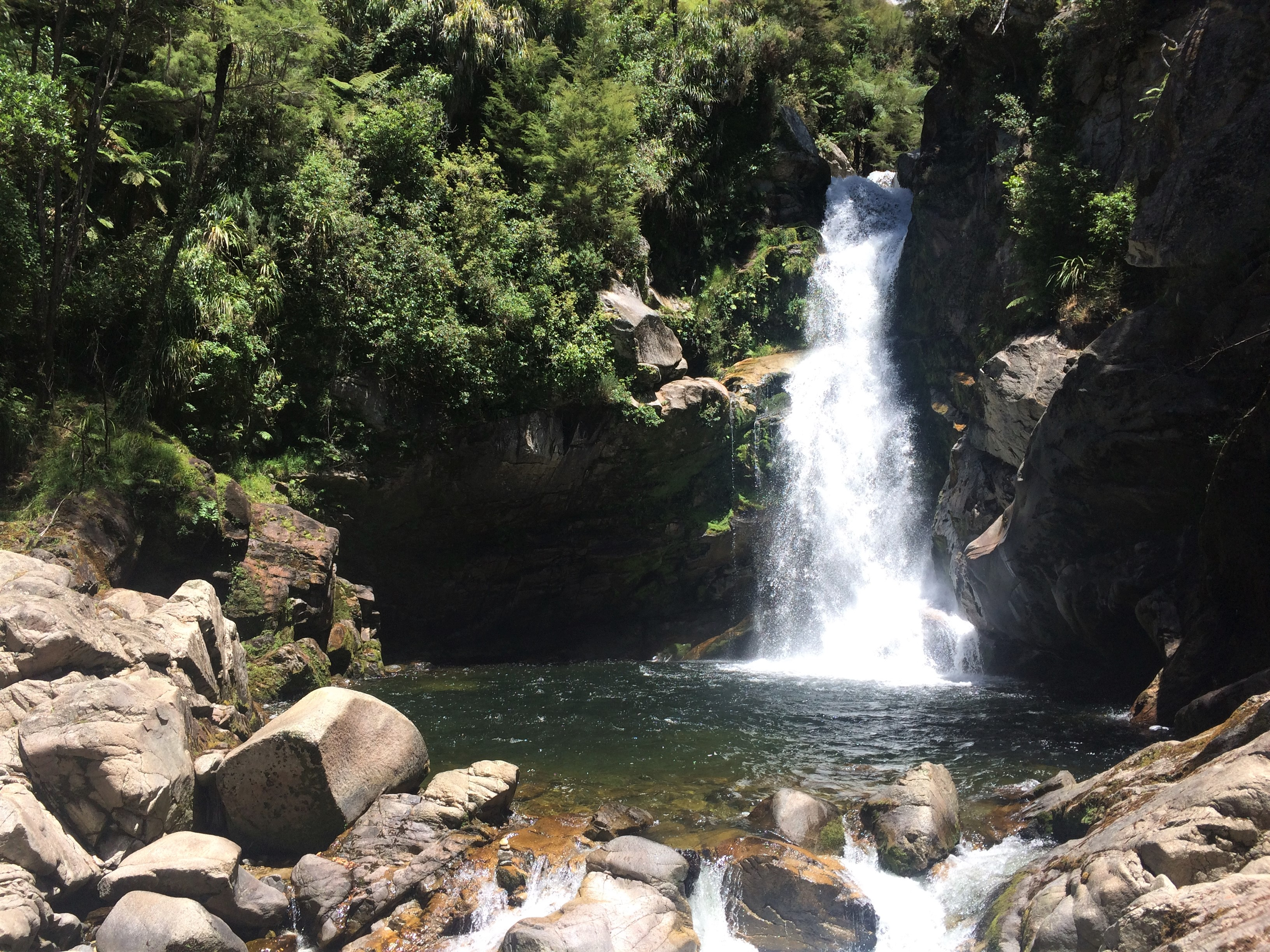
Wainui Falls, which can be reached at the end of the Wainui Falls Track.

The Wainui River flows north through Abel Tasman National Park from its sources on the slopes of Mount Evans to reach the small Wainui Bay, an indentation close to the eastern end of Golden Bay. The sources of Wainui River near Wainui Saddle are close to the Abel Tasman Inland Track. Shortly after, the Wainui Track follows its course for a few kilometers, with Wainui Hut situated next to the river.

Almost all of Wainui River's course is through dense native bush, with the lower half meandering through a narrow gorge where the river eventually flows over the 20 metres (66 ft) tall Wainui Falls, one of the most accessible waterfalls in the Tasman region. Wainui Falls can be reached from a car park in Wainui Bay via the gentle Wainui Falls Track.
