= Tinline Bay =

Bay in New Zealand

Coordinates: 40°59′25″S 173°01′32″E

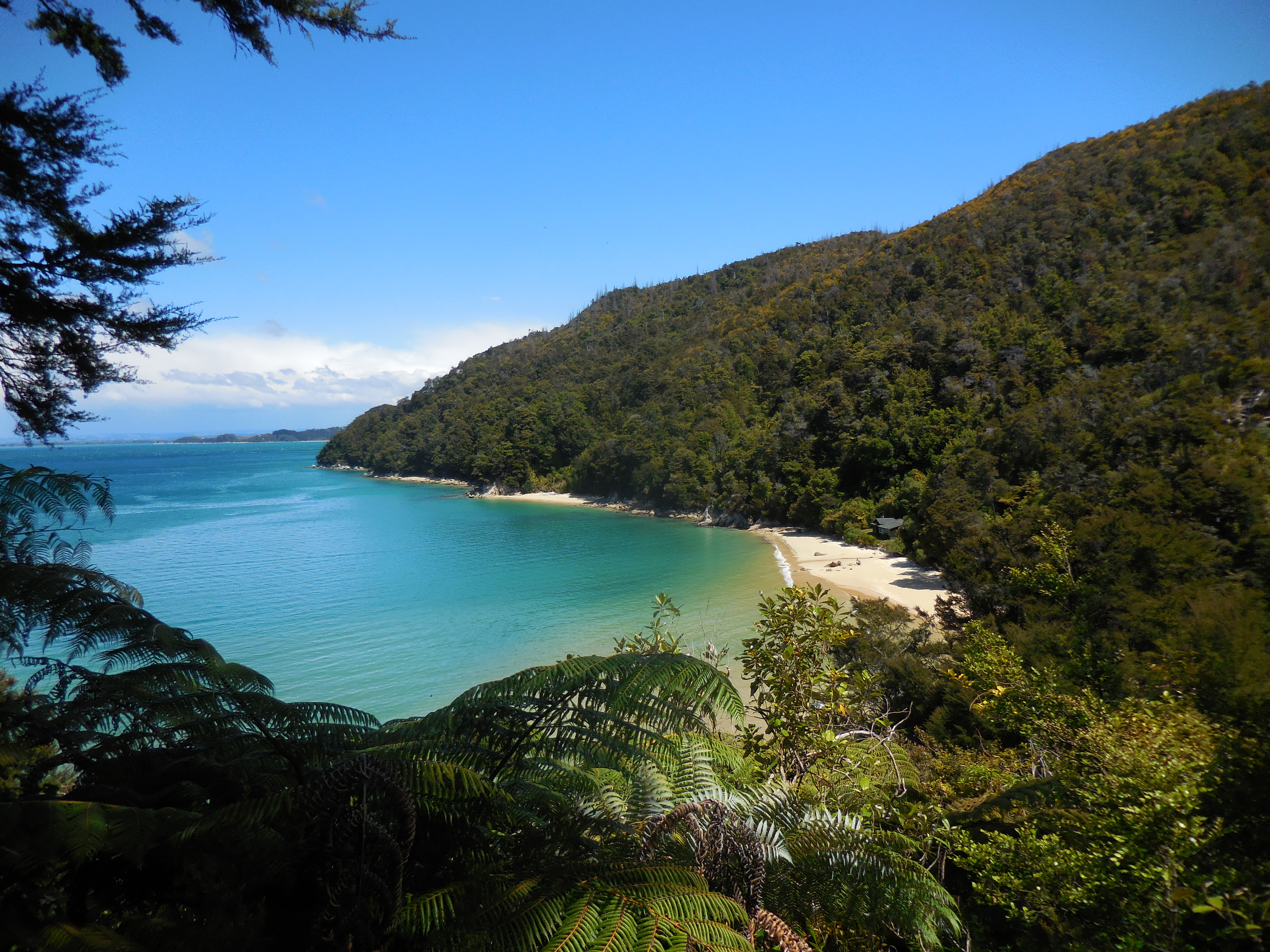
Tinline Bay

Tinline Bay is a cove and beach located within The Abel Tasman National Park in the South Island of New Zealand.

It is located approximately 2 kilometres from the entrance to the park near Mārahau and is the southern start of The Abel Tasman Inland Track. A sandy beach, it is a popular stopping off point for hikers, and for kayakers from the Tasman Sea. It is also the site of a Department of Conservation campsite.

Tinline Stream flows into the bay. John Tinline lived for some time in nearby Mārahau and both the waterway and the bay are named after him.
