= Ballon Rock =

Island in New Zealand

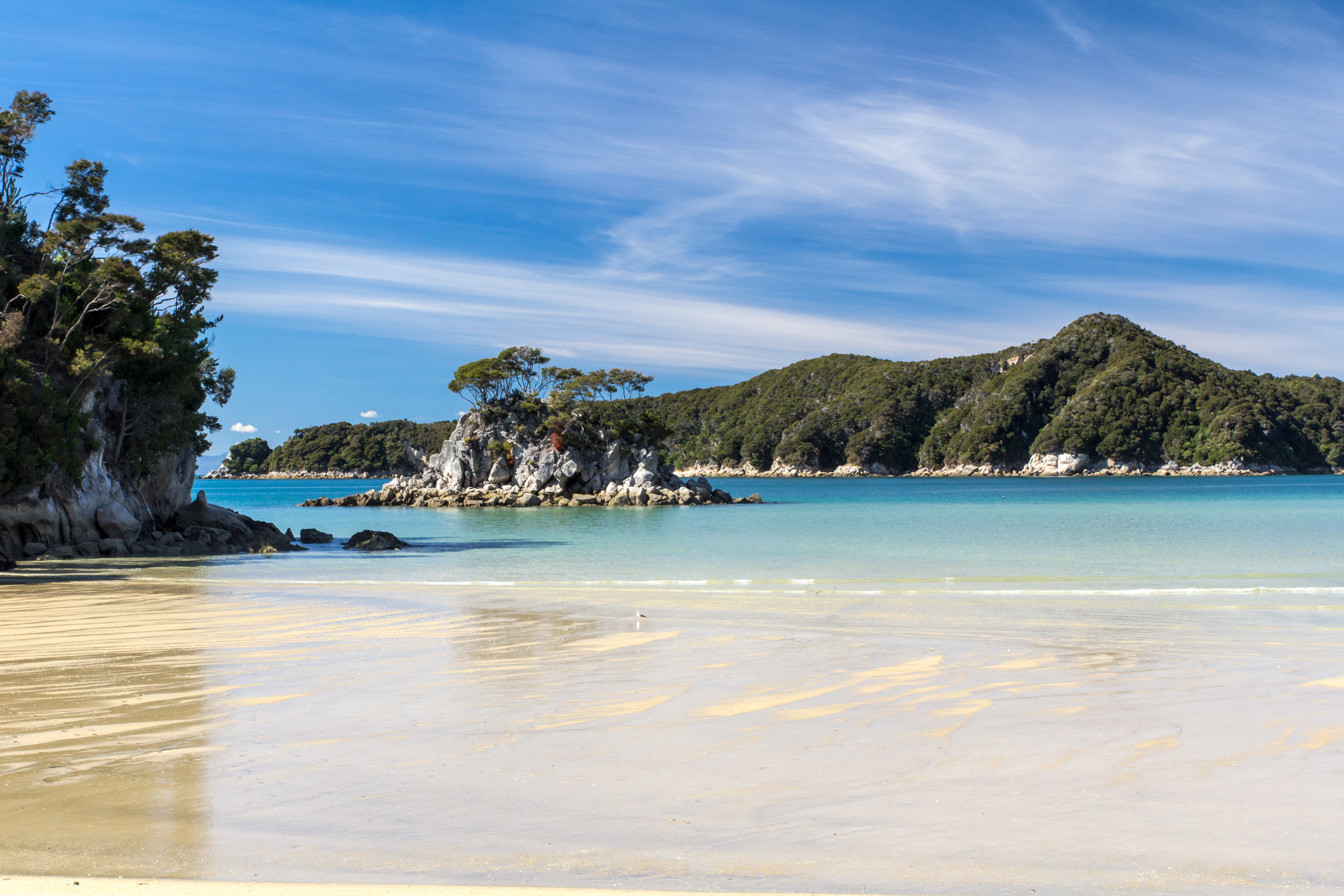

Geography
- Coordinates: 40.94554°S 173.05290°E

Administration
- New Zealand
- Region: Tasman

Demographics
- Population: uninhabited

Ballon Rock is an island in the Rākauroa / Torrent Bay in the Tasman District of New Zealand.

== See also ==
- List of islands of New Zealand
