= Tōtaranui =

Beach in New Zealand

Coordinates: 40.826°S 173.005°E

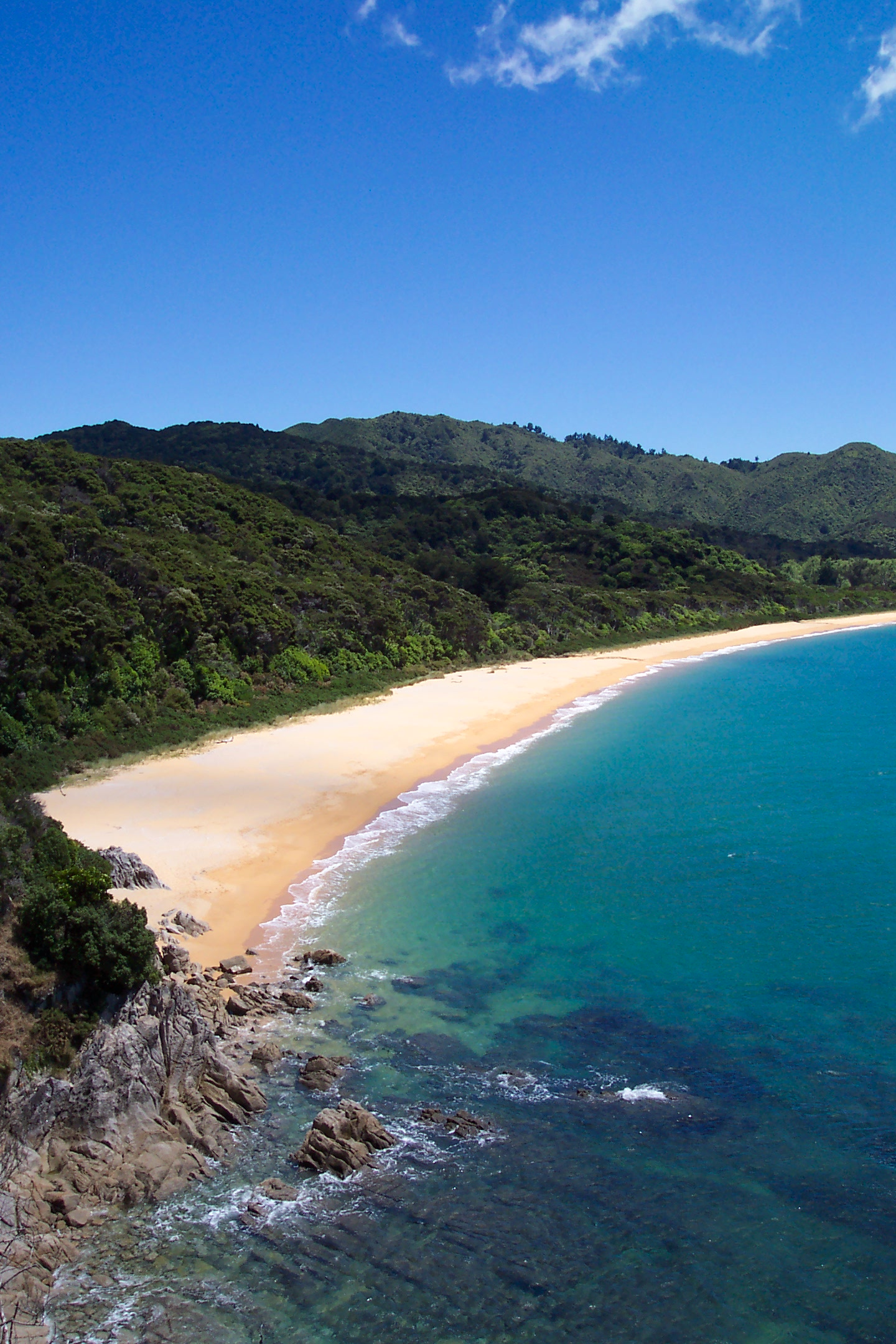
Tōtaranui is a 1 km long beach and the site of a large campsite located in Abel Tasman National Park

Tōtaranui is a 1 km long beach and the site of a large campsite in the Tasman Region of New Zealand administered by the Department of Conservation (DOC).

It is located in Abel Tasman National Park toward the northern end of the Abel Tasman Track and is often used as a starting or finishing point for the walk.

Tōtaranui is noted for the golden colour of its sand, more intense than other beaches in the Park, the result of a high content of orthoclase minerals in the eroded granite sands of the vicinity.

The New Zealand Ministry for Culture and Heritage gives a translation of "many tōtara trees" for Tōtaranui.

== History ==
The Ngāti Tūmatakōkiri iwi, having been forced out of Queen Charlotte Sound / Tōtaranui by Ngāti Kurī, settled north of the sounds along the coast and may have brought the name Tōtaranui with them.

Once a farming settlement, the only permanent residents now are DOC staff. During summer, the population swells by up to 1000 campers plus hikers on the track. Water taxi services from Mārahau link Tōtaranui with other localities around the Park coastline, while a road links Tōtaranui with Tākaka via Pigeon Saddle.

Farming ceased after the foundation of the Abel Tasman National Park in 1942 and forest has been allowed to naturally regenerate through mānuka and kānuka to its original mix of southern beech and lowland podocarp.

== Climate ==
Climate data for Tōtaranui (1981–2010)
Month	Jan	Feb	Mar	Apr	May	Jun	Jul	Aug	Sep	Oct	Nov	Dec	Year
Mean daily maximum °C (°F)	22.4 (72.3)	22.6 (72.7)	21.0 (69.8)	18.3 (64.9)	16.2 (61.2)	13.7 (56.7)	13.1 (55.6)	13.7 (56.7)	15.4 (59.7)	16.9 (62.4)	18.5 (65.3)	20.4 (68.7)	17.7 (63.8)
Daily mean °C (°F)	17.4 (63.3)	17.8 (64.0)	16.3 (61.3)	13.8 (56.8)	11.7 (53.1)	9.5 (49.1)	8.6 (47.5)	9.3 (48.7)	10.9 (51.6)	12.3 (54.1)	13.9 (57.0)	15.9 (60.6)	13.1 (55.6)
Mean daily minimum °C (°F)	12.3 (54.1)	12.9 (55.2)	11.6 (52.9)	9.3 (48.7)	7.2 (45.0)	5.2 (41.4)	4.0 (39.2)	4.9 (40.8)	6.5 (43.7)	7.7 (45.9)	9.3 (48.7)	11.4 (52.5)	8.5 (47.3)
Source: NIWA
