= Torrent River =

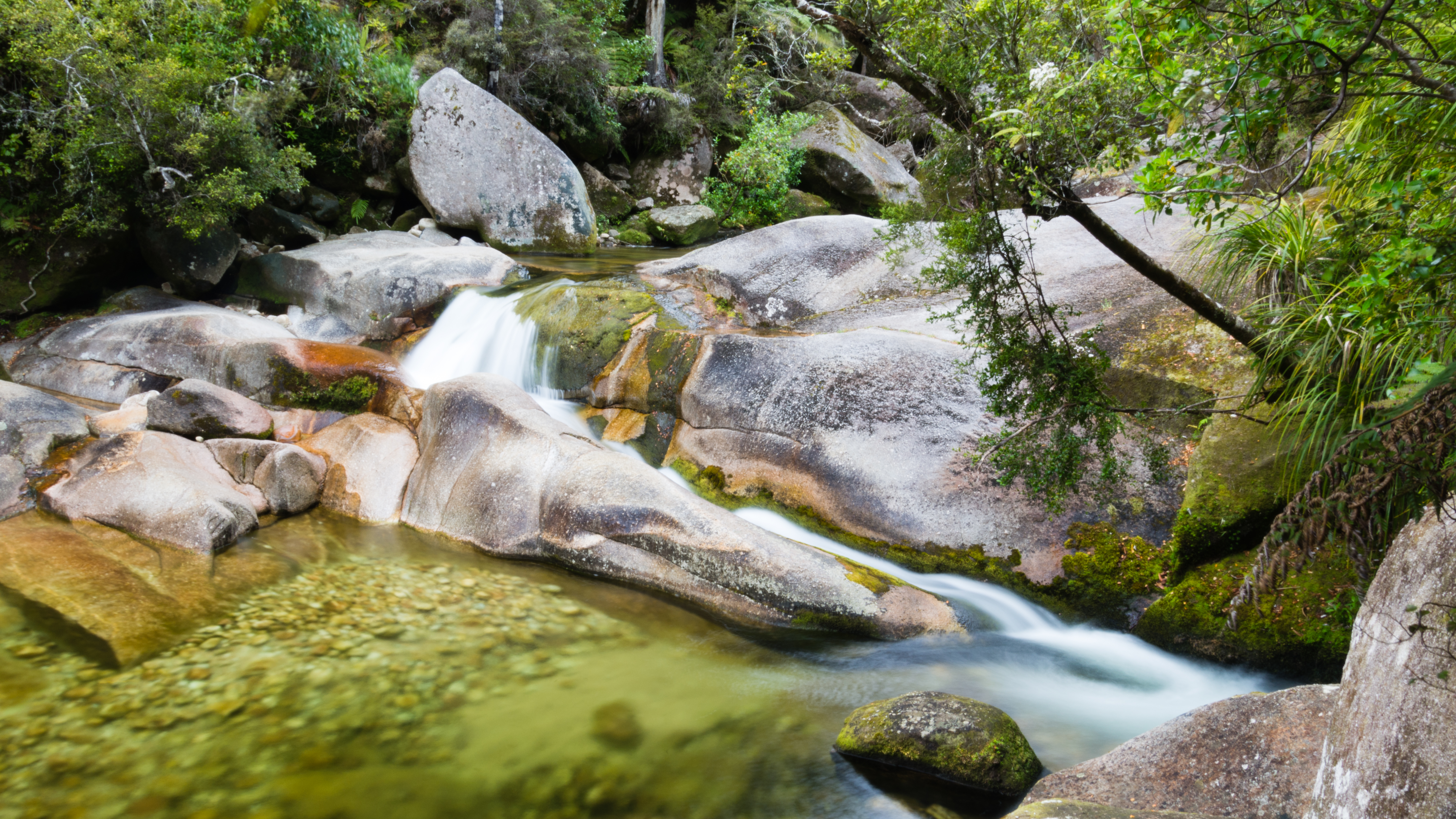
- Cleopatras Pool, located along the Torrent River
- Route of the Torrent River
- Mouth of the Torrent River Torrent River (South Island)

Location
- Country: New Zealand

Physical characteristics
- Source
  - coordinates: 40°56′51″S 172°59′33″E
- Mouth
  - location: Torrent Bay
  - coordinates: 40°57′22″S 173°02′31″E
  - elevation: 0 metres (0 ft)
- Length: 5 km (3.1 mi)

Basin features
- Progression: Torrent River → Torrent Bay → Tasman Bay → Tasman Sea
- Waterbodies: Cleopatra's Pool

The Torrent River is a river of the Tasman Region of New Zealand's South Island. It flows east to reach Torrent Bay on the Tasman Bay / Te Tai-o-Aorere coast of the Abel Tasman National Park. The Abel Tasman Track crosses the river close to its mouth.

== See also ==
- List of rivers of New Zealand
