= Wainui Falls =

Waterfall in Tasman, New Zealand

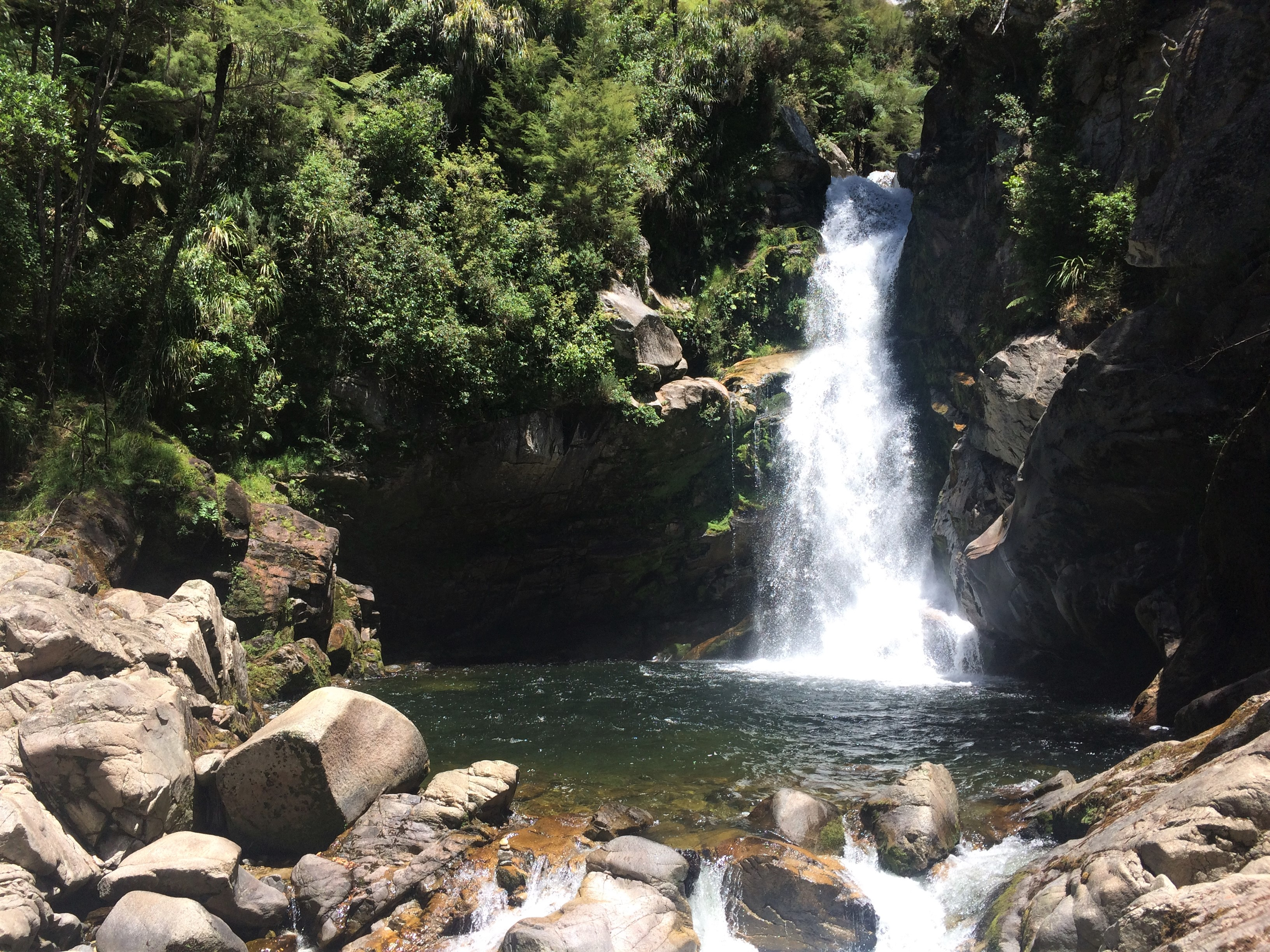
- Wainui Falls in December 2017

- Location within New Zealand
- Location: Wainui Bay, Tasman, New Zealand.
- Coordinates: 40.84924°S 172.92765°E
- Type: Horsetail
- Total height: 20 metres (66 ft)
- Watercourse: Wainui River

Wainui Falls is a 20-metre (66 ft) waterfall in Wainui Bay, in the Tasman region of New Zealand. The waterfall is part of the Wainui River and cascades over granite bedrock into a deep pool at its base. It is the largest and most accessible waterfall in the Abel Tasman National Park and the Nelson-Golden Bay area, and can be reached via the short Wainui Falls Track. The track is popular as a day walk among tourists, and while the waters of the Wainui River can be too cold for swimming much of the year, the plunge pool is a favoured swimming hole in the summer months.

== Location ==
The falls are located up the valley from Wainui Bay, within the Abel Tasman National Park. The nearest town is Tākaka, a 20-kilometre (12 mi) drive away, and the nearest city is Nelson, around a 2.5 hours' drive.

== Wainui Falls Track ==
The waterfall can be reached via the Wainui Falls Track, a 3.4 km (2.1 mi) round-trip bush walk that follows the Wainui River up to the waterfall. The track is accessed via a carpark at the end of Wainui Falls Rd, 300 m (980 ft) from the main road (Abel Tasman Drive). A cafe and toilets are available at the carpark area. The track takes about 1 to 1.5 hours round-trip.

The track meanders through a native forest of ferns, nīkau palms, and rātā trees. Giant carnivorous land snails of the genus Powelliphanta, among the largest land snails in the world, can sometimes be found on the forest floor near the track.

The waterfall has been a popular sightseeing destination since at least the early 20th century. Older locals report that "in the early days" when people used to drive out to the track in Ford Model Ts, the track was very steep and that it was common for trampers to fall in the river.

The track was closed for maintenance in 2015 for several months while the track was re-engineered and a new 10-person-capacity suspension bridge was built to replace the old suspension bridge, which was a one-at-a-time crossing and could result in significant queues during summer months. The bridge crosses the Wainui River above large granite blocks and tumbled logs that pile up after winter floods. While some locals lamented that the track had lost a bit of its charm and feeling of danger (with regards to the old bridge), they also commented that it was a huge benefit that the track was now more accessible to everyone. The track is maintained by the New Zealand Department of Conservation.

== In Māori mythology ==
In the mythology of the local Tākaka Māori, a taniwha (water guardian) called Ngārara Huarau terrorises a local village, who eventually retaliate by killing the monster. Upon the taniwha's death, its severed tail lands in the pool at the base of Wainui Falls. The rocks downstream from the falls have rusty red-brown staining that the story attributes to the seepage of blood from the tail.

== Gallery ==
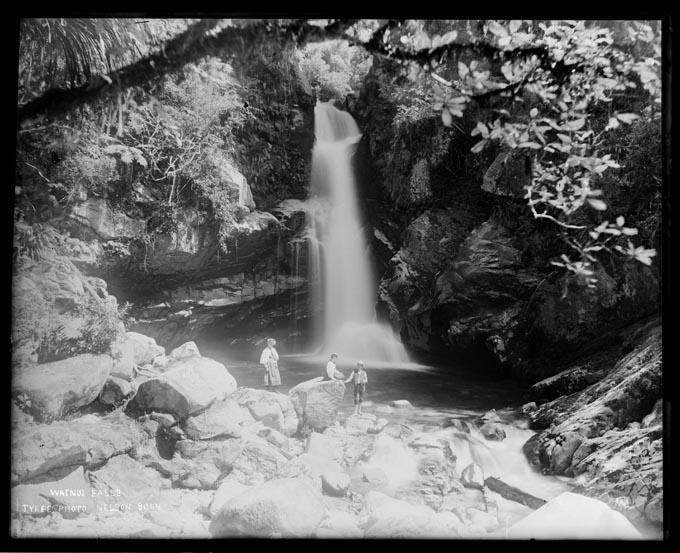
Sightseers visiting Wainui Falls, late 1800s or early 1900s. From the Tyree Collection.

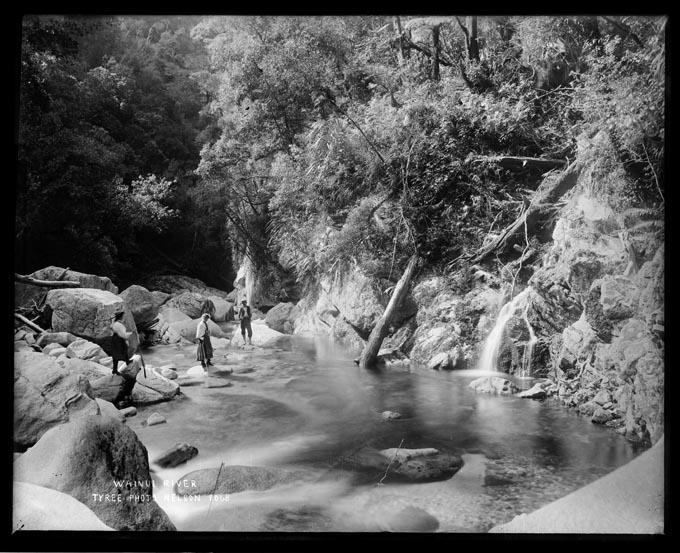
Sightseers in the Wainui River and another small waterfall visible from the Wainui Falls Track (not Wainui Falls). Late 1800s or early 1900s. From the Tyree Collection.

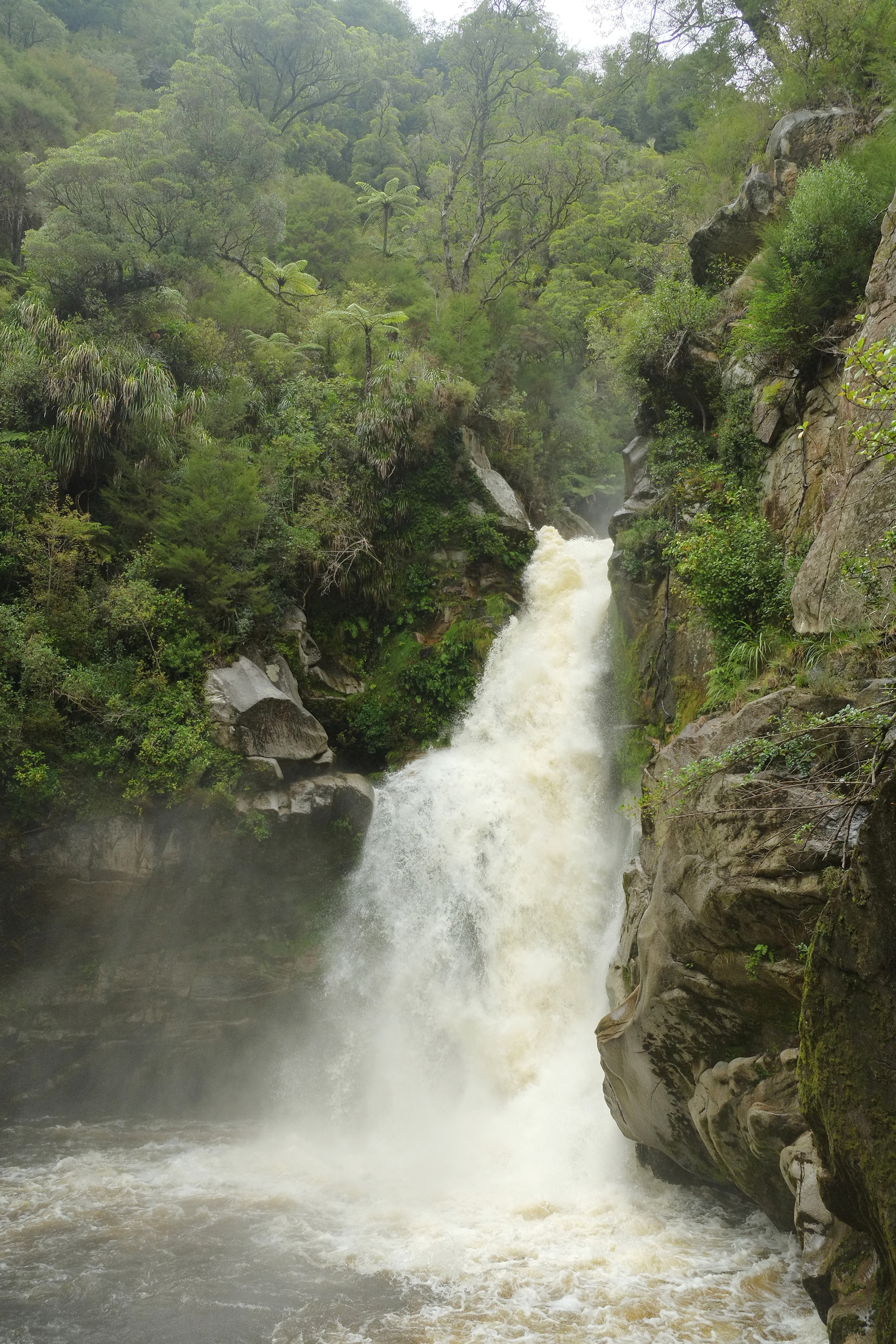
Falls in full flow, 2015

== See also ==
- List of waterfalls
- List of waterfalls in New Zealand
