= Mārahau River =

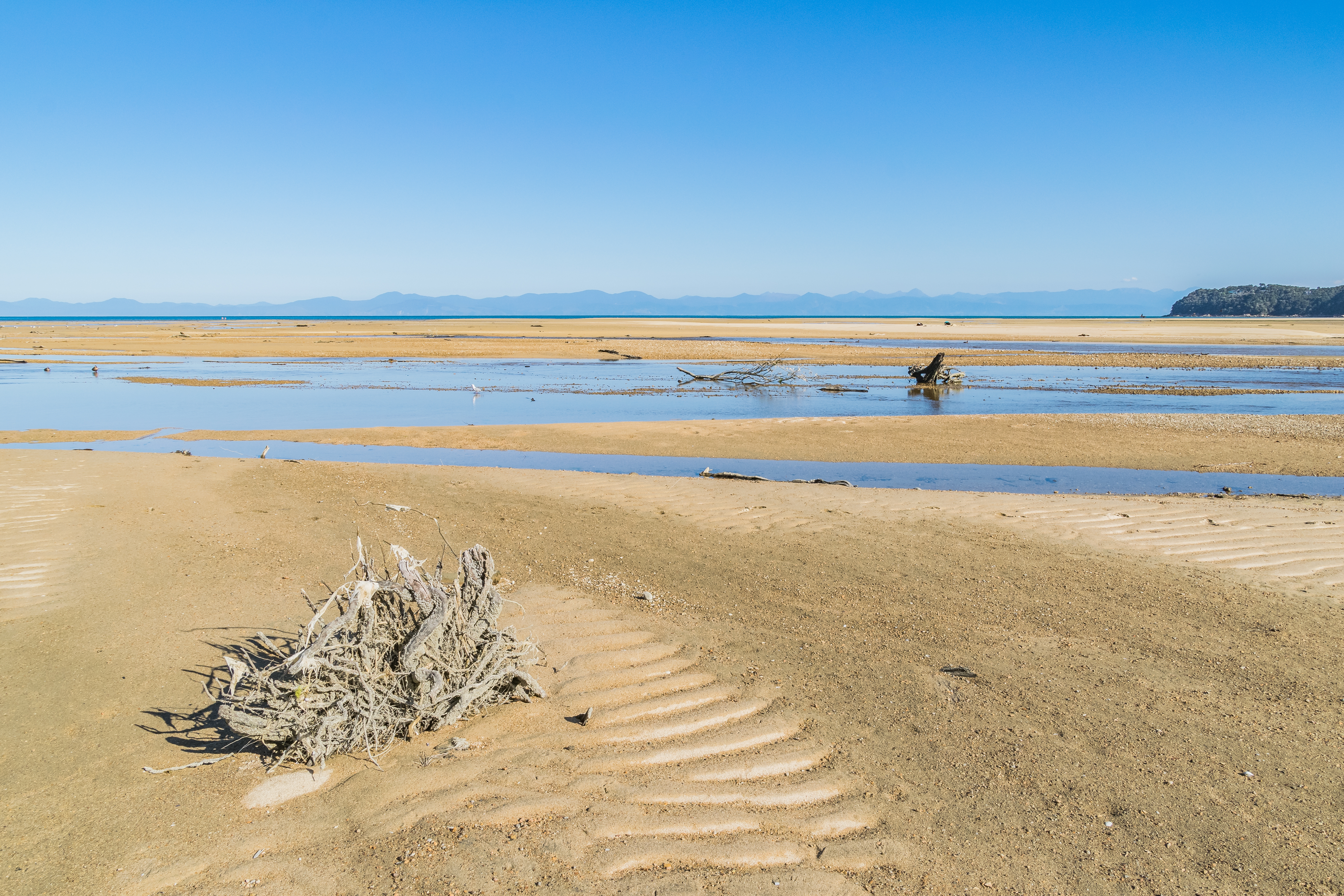
- Route of the Mārahau River
- Mouth of the Mārahau River Mārahau River (South Island)

Location
- Country: New Zealand

Physical characteristics
- Source
  - location: Mount Evans
  - coordinates: 40°57′04″S 172°55′35″E
- Mouth
  - location: Sandfly Bay
  - coordinates: 40°59′52″S 173°00′25″E
  - elevation: 0 metres (0 ft)

Basin features
- Progression: Mārahau River → Sandy Bay → Tasman Bay → Tasman Sea

The Mārahau River is a river of the Tasman Region, New Zealand. The river originated on the eastern slopes of Mount Evans in the Abel Tasman National Park, and flows south-east towards Sandy Bay, a bay of Tasman Bay, north of the village of Mārahau.

== See also ==
- List of rivers of New Zealand
