= Wainui Bay =

Bay in Tasman Region, New Zealand

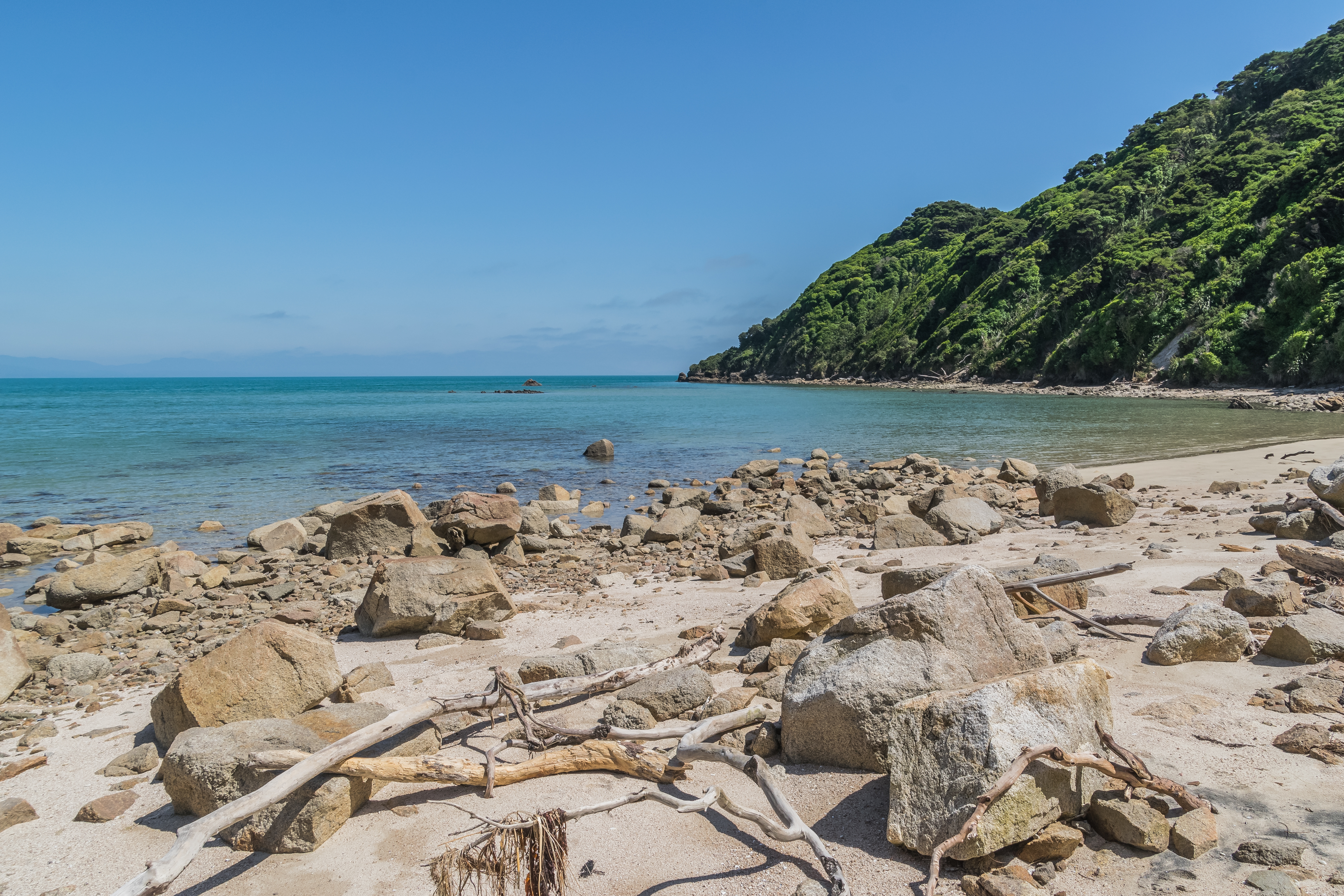
- Eastern side of Wainui Bay, on the Taupo Point track

- Location of Wainui Bay in New Zealand
- Coordinates: 40.80°S 172.94°E
- Part of: Golden Bay / Mohua
- River sources: Wainui River
- Ocean/sea sources: Tasman Sea
- Sections/sub-basins: Wainui Inlet

Wainui Bay is within Golden Bay / Mohua, and at the south-eastern end of Golden Bay, in the Tasman Region of the South Island, New Zealand.

Wainui Bay in Golden Bay / Mohua

Bordering the Abel Tasman National Park, it is approximately 24 kilometres (15 mi) north-east of Tākaka, the nearest town. There are several Department of Conservation walking tracks that start in Wainui Bay, including the Wainui Falls track, the Taupō Point track, and other tracks leading into the Abel Tasman National Park.

On 18 December 1642, the first known encounter between Māori and Europeans happened out in the bay, which resulted in several dead Dutch sailors and the surrounding area being named Murderer's Bay.

== Naming ==
Wainui is a Māori language term (wai meaning water, and nui meaning large, expansive). In other words, the name translates as big water. The umbrella entity for the three local iwi gives a meaning of "where the tidal flow leaves a big expanse of bay empty". It is one of many places named Wainui in New Zealand, for example, Wainui, Wainui Beach, Wainui in Akaroa Harbour.

There are three plausible explanations for the name Taupō:

1. In the sixteenth century a chief, Tūmatakōkiri, migrated from Lake Taupō to the Cook Strait area, thus it is conceivable he brought the name with him
2. The meaning of taupō is ‘a rough black and yellow cloak’, made from flax leaves, and also ‘a rust-coloured earth of stone’. This same pattern is seen on the rocks here
3. And lastly, the place used to be spoken of as Taipo. The iwi once revered a taipō, a many-scaled goblin, with the body of sea serpent and the head of a man Although this is the least plausible name, because taipo is thought to be an 18th-century whaler's term for an evil spirit, and in the South Island Maori dialect the word for an evil spirit is atua

== Local places ==
=== Wainui Inlet ===
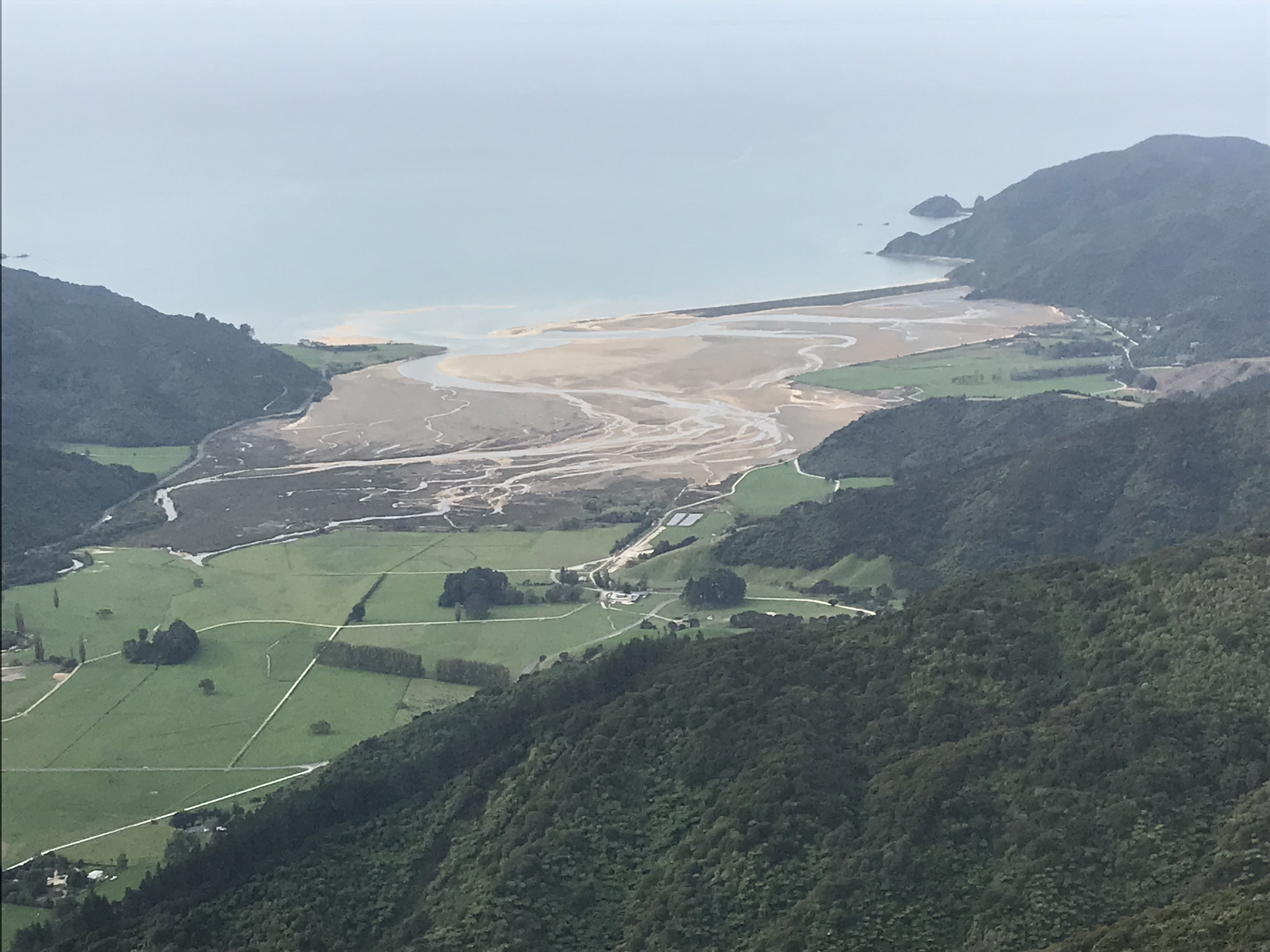
Wainui Inlet from the air

Wainui Inlet is the estuary of the Wainui River that flows into the bay. It can be walked across within two hours either side of low tide.

=== Uarau Point ===
Uarau Point is a prominent hill on the eastern shore of Wainui Bay. In Māori legend, a taipō (goblin, evil spirit) named Ngārara-huarau, protected this place. It remains a spiritual area, and some local people feel uneasy walking past the cave where he lived. According to legend, Ngārara-huarau dug caverns here. Underground rumbles from falling rock and cascading water continue today, and it is a dangerous area to traverse owing to many sinkholes.

=== Taupō Point ===
Taupō Point is a 49-metre-high (161 ft) limestone outcrop on the eastern side of Wainui Bay. This steep, rounded, bush-clad knoll is linked to the granite mainland by a sandy isthmus. Four centuries ago, a pā stood there. Today, as then, it is a great lookout spot. Traces of trenches, terraces and cooking pits are now hidden under mataī, tītoki, nīkau and karaka trees.

A few steps away, is a lonely curve of golden sand known as Whariwharangi Bay. Abel Tasman anchored his ships off here.

Researchers into history debate whether or not waka landing sites at Taupō Point are the oldest maritime structures in New Zealand.

==== Māori activity at the time of Tasman's visit ====
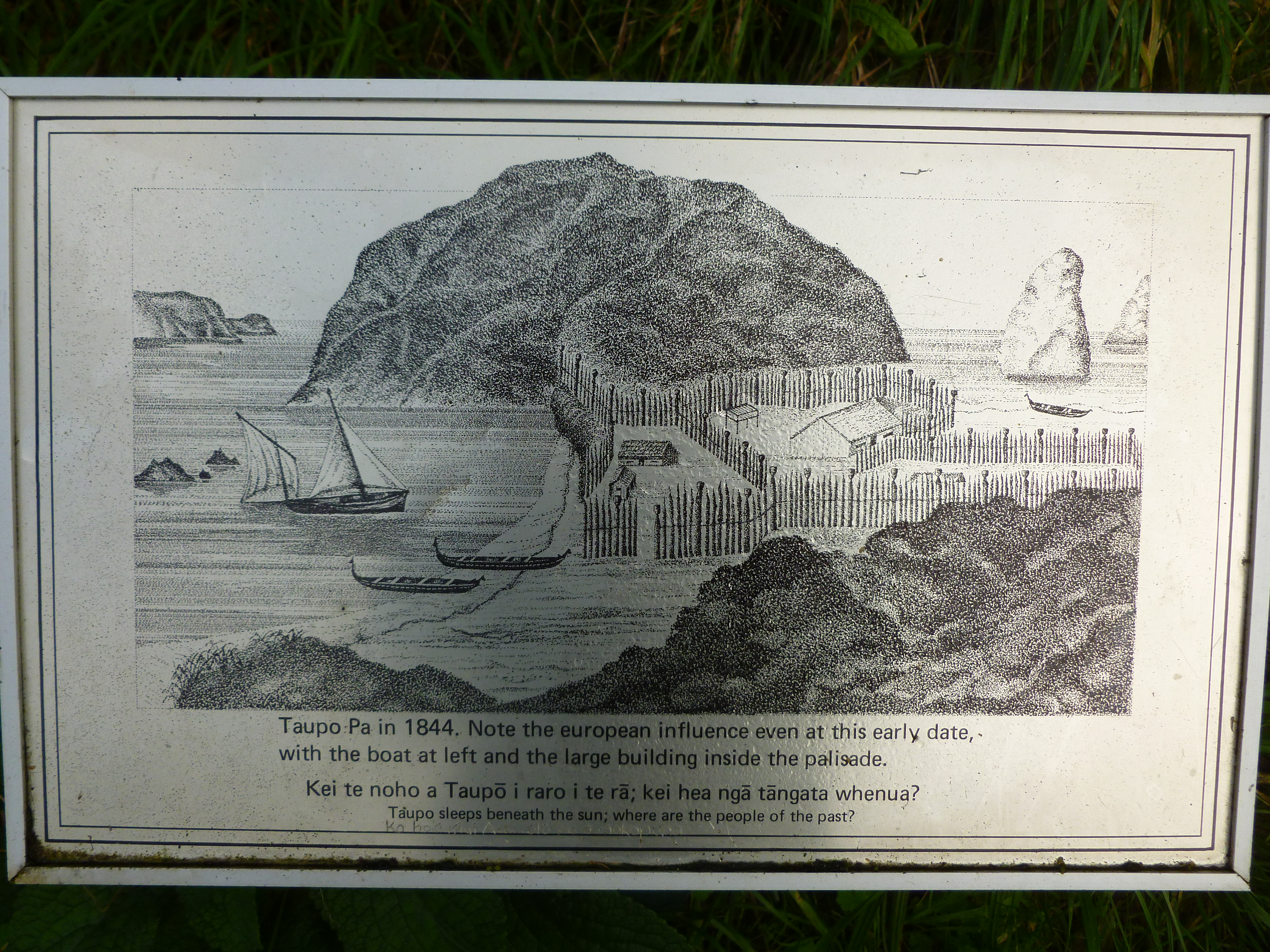
This sign at Taupō Point depicts an engraving of an 1844 drawing by NZ Company surveyor John Barnicoat

At the time of Tasman’s bloody visit to Aotearoa, the Ngāti Tūmatakōkiri iwi maintained a pā and settlement on the eastern side of Wainui Bay at Taupō Point and nearby Whariwharangi Beach. This is the closest site to where the Dutch voyager anchored, and it is most probably from here that waka and warriors paddled out to investigate his ships and intentions.

A drawing by Tasman's artist, Isaack Gilsemans, depicts ten men rowing a double-hulled waka, with another man standing on the prow. All the men have topknot hairstyles.

The settlement had houses were built low to the grounds, curved-roof cooking shelters, storage pits and high storage racks. The bay and inlet teemed with fish and shellfish, and an edible braken fern grew on the hillside.

A sign at Taupō Point, depicts the scene from 1844, with pā, palisades and waka landed on the beach, as drawn by surveyor John Barnicoat. A proverb, or whakataukī, inscribed on the sign reads:

Taupo sleeps beneath the sun: where are the people of the past?
Kei te noho a Taupō i raro i te rā; kei hea ngā tāngata whenua?'

Someone has scratched some graffiti underneath the whakataukī. It reads:

Ko hoki mai au... ete i o a mokopuna

Which may translate as "I will return... with some of my grandchildren."

==== New Zealand's oldest maritime archaeological structures? ====
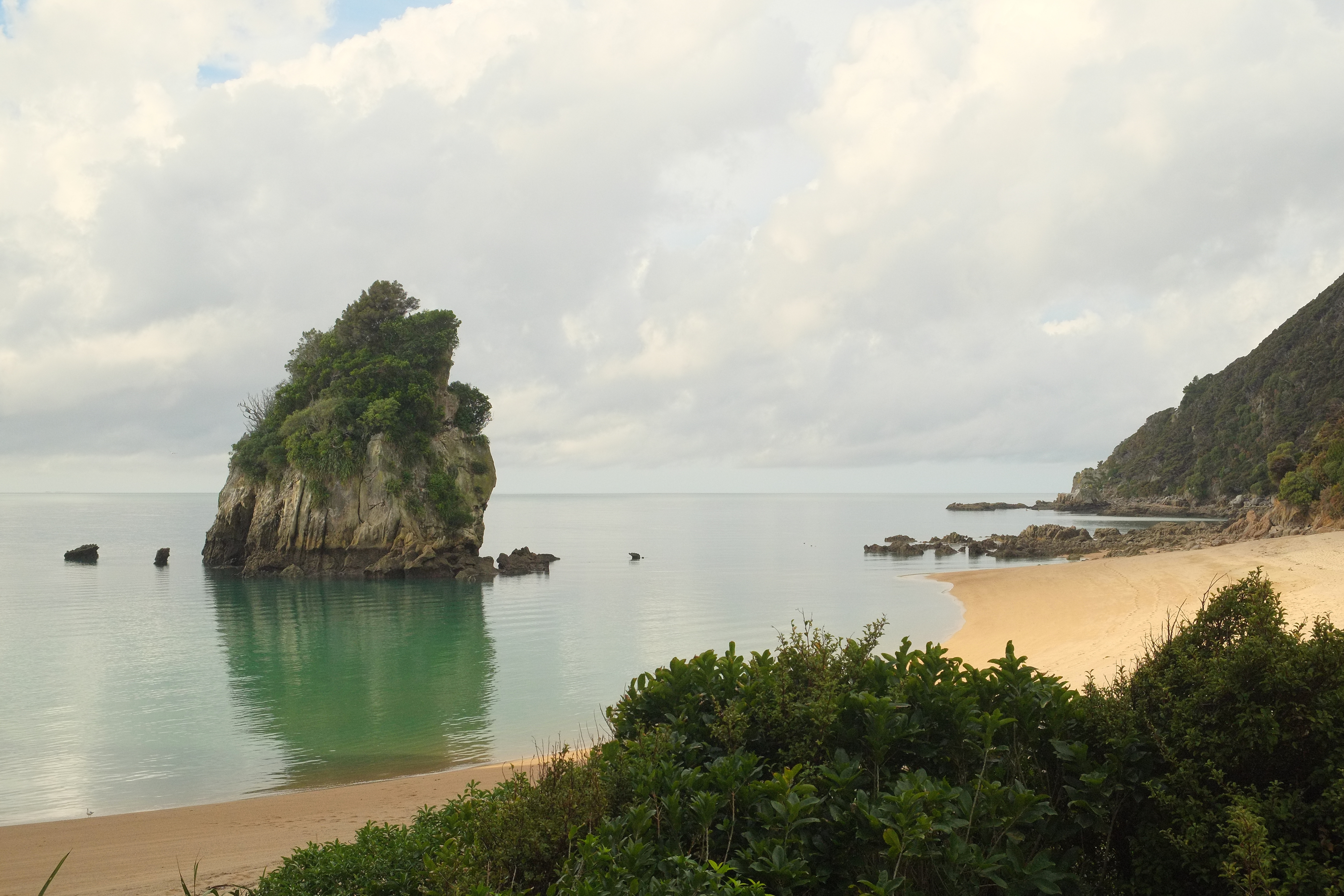
Beach along the Taupō Point track

In 2015, historical researcher, Rosanne Hawarden, claimed that a high-resolution image of the Gilsemans's 1642 drawing reveals waka landing sites on the shore by Taupō Point. In addition, Barnicoat's 1844 ink drawing of Taupō Point, shows waka on the same rocky beach, where large boulders have been shifted so waka could be hauled ashore. These tauranga waka are still visible at low tide.

On the other hand, a group of historians led by Abel Tasman expert Grahame Anderson, debunked Hawarden’s research, and called it "wishful thinking".

==== Access ====
People arrive here on foot, or by boat, or kayak. The walk along the beach from Wainui Inlet to Taupō Point takes approximately 1 hour each way, and is best done at low tide. At high tide, some scrambling and climbing is needed. The track starts at the end of McShane Road, just past Wainui Inlet.
