= Abel Tasman Inland Track =

Hiking trail in New Zealand

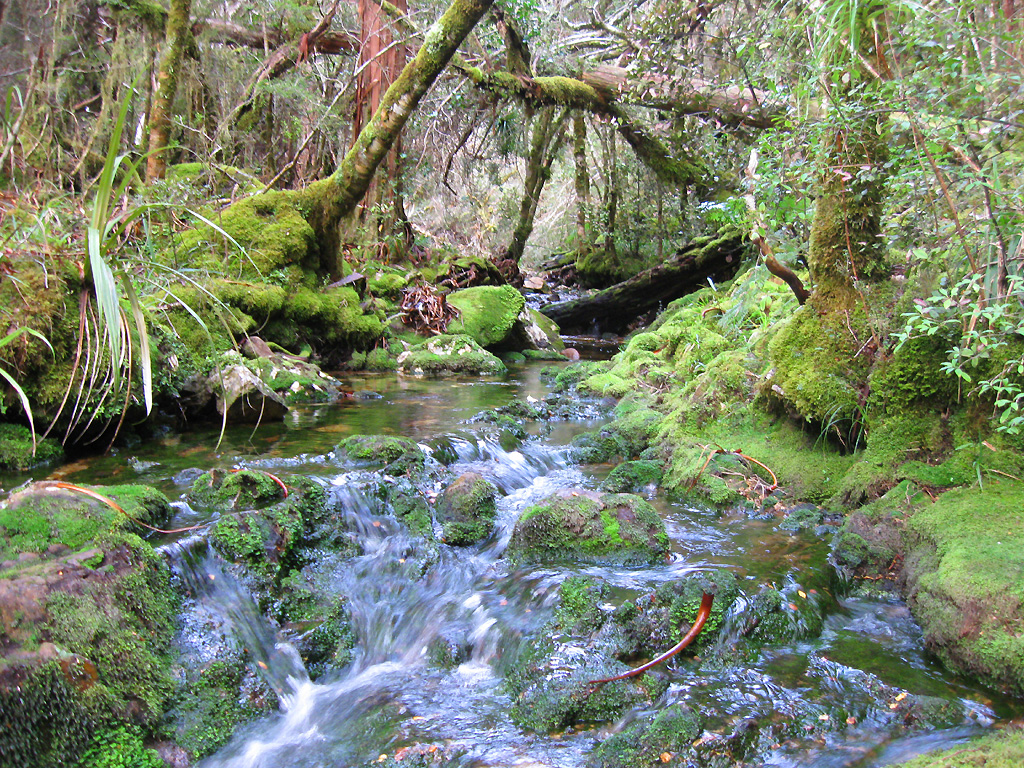
Abel Tasman Inland Track stream

The Abel Tasman Inland Track is a 38 km (24 mi) tramping track that runs through the centre of the Abel Tasman National Park and is maintained by the Department of Conservation. It diverts from the main Abel Tasman Coast Track between Tinline Bay and Torrent Bay. Although the coast track has the reputation of being New Zealand's most popular walking track, the inland track is a much less walked route, with regular back-country huts.

== Location ==
| Point | Coordinates (links to map & photo sources) | Notes |
|---|---|---|
| Marahau, southern gateway | 40.995745°S 173.005051°E | |
| Holyoake's Shelter | 40.964175°S 173.001611°E | |
| Castle Rocks Hut | 40.961683°S 172.953595°E | |
| Moa Park Shelter | 40.938024°S 172.935947°E | |
| Track to Canaan car park | 40.935914°S 172.928776°E | |
| Track to Wainui Hut | 40.907074°S 172.930559°E | |
| Awapoto Hut | 40.862912°S 172.938701°E | |
| Pigeon Saddle | 40.832799°S 172.968755°E | |
| Wainui car park | 40.809564°S 172.956111°E | |

== See also ==
- National parks of New Zealand
- New Zealand tramping tracks
