= Torrent Bay =

Bay in Abel Tasman National Park, New Zealand

Coordinates: 40.947°S 173.053°E

- Rākauroa (Māori)
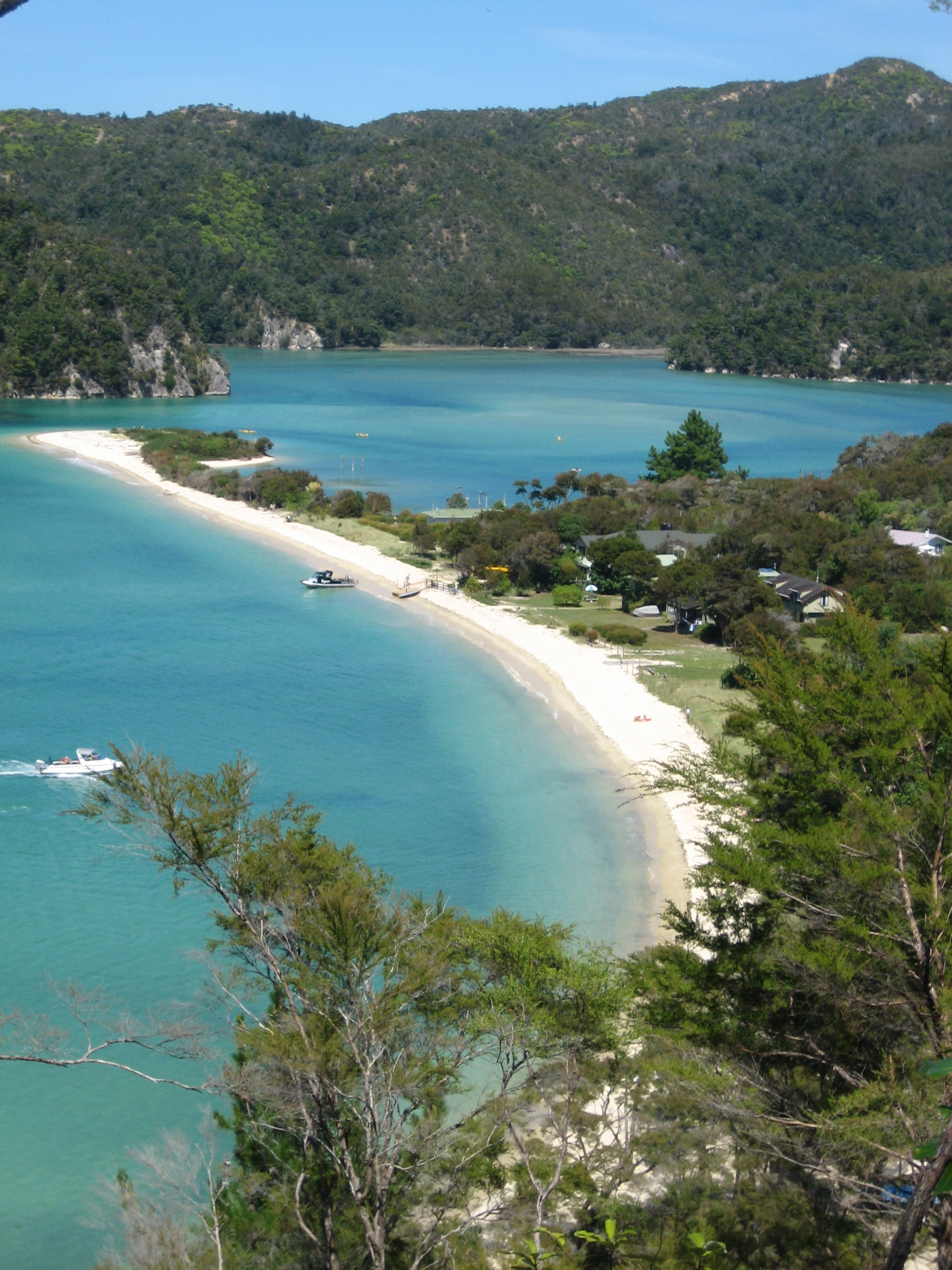
- Torrent Bay beach and holiday houses

- Location within New Zealand
- Location: Abel Tasman National Park, New Zealand
- Managing agency: Department of Conservation

Rākauroa / Torrent Bay is a bay in Abel Tasman National Park, New Zealand.

== History ==
Torrent Bay was named by French explorer Dumont D'Urville during his exploration and mapping of this area of New Zealand in 1827. The area was surveyed as a village in the 1920s. When Abel Tasman National Park was formed in 1942, the village was not included in the Park, so remains as a village of holiday houses on privately owned land within the National Park. As part of the Motueka Ward of the Tasman District Council, land is of freehold title and can be onsold and built on, within strict building codes and resource consents. There is no road access, and no electricity but water is supplied to most properties. There is a small camping area but most accommodation is in private holiday homes. There is one Lodge operated as accommodation for walkers and kayakers on commercial trips with Wilsons Abel Tasman. Access to Torrent Bay is through a walking track from Marahau, or by boat from one of the many water taxi services operating in the area. Kayak tours are also available.

The bay is fed by the waters of the short Torrent River and the smaller Tregidga Creek.

In August 2014, the name of the bay was officially altered to Rākauroa / Torrent Bay.

The New Zealand Ministry for Culture and Heritage gives a translation of "tall trees" for Rākauroa.

== Gallery ==
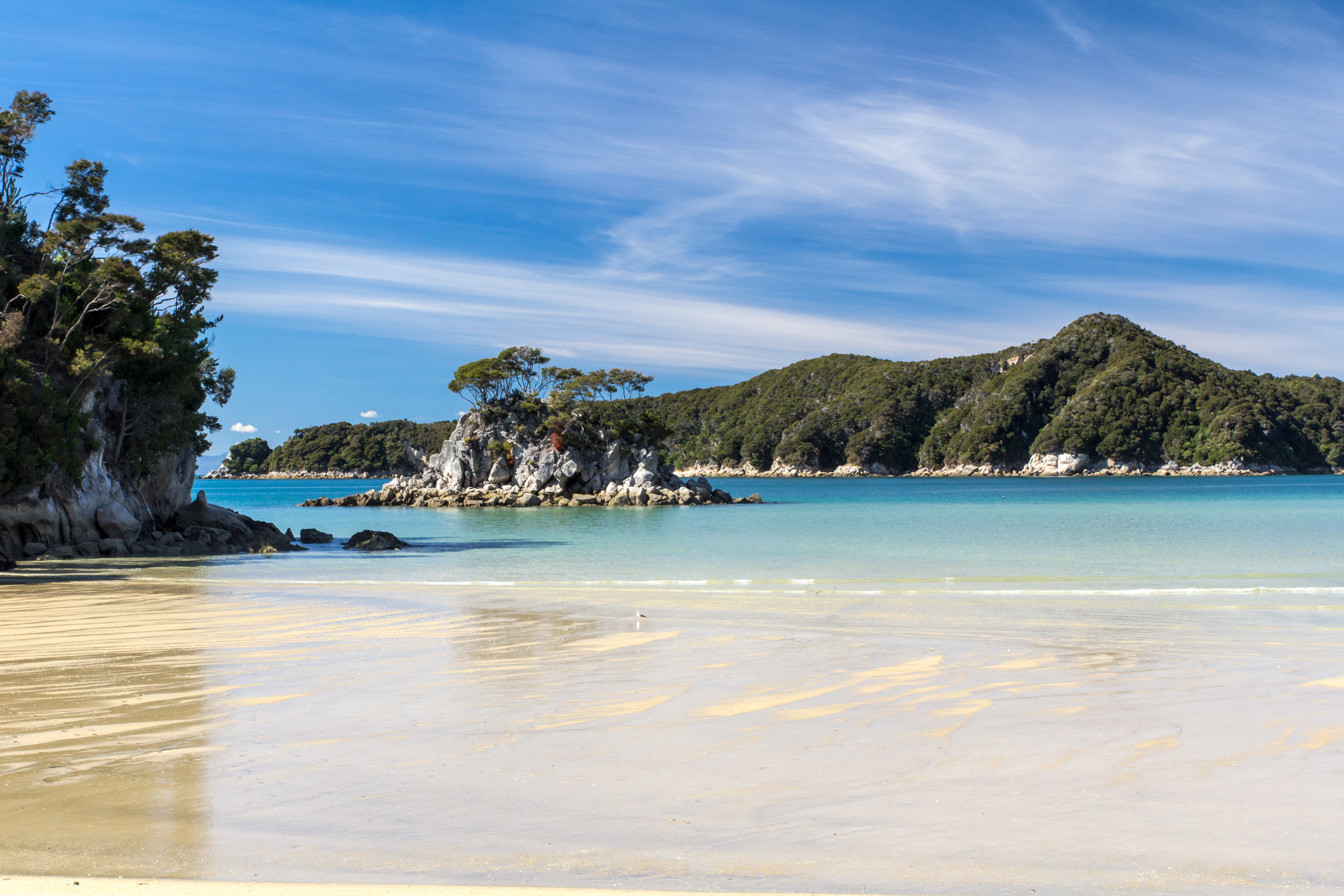
Ballon Rock

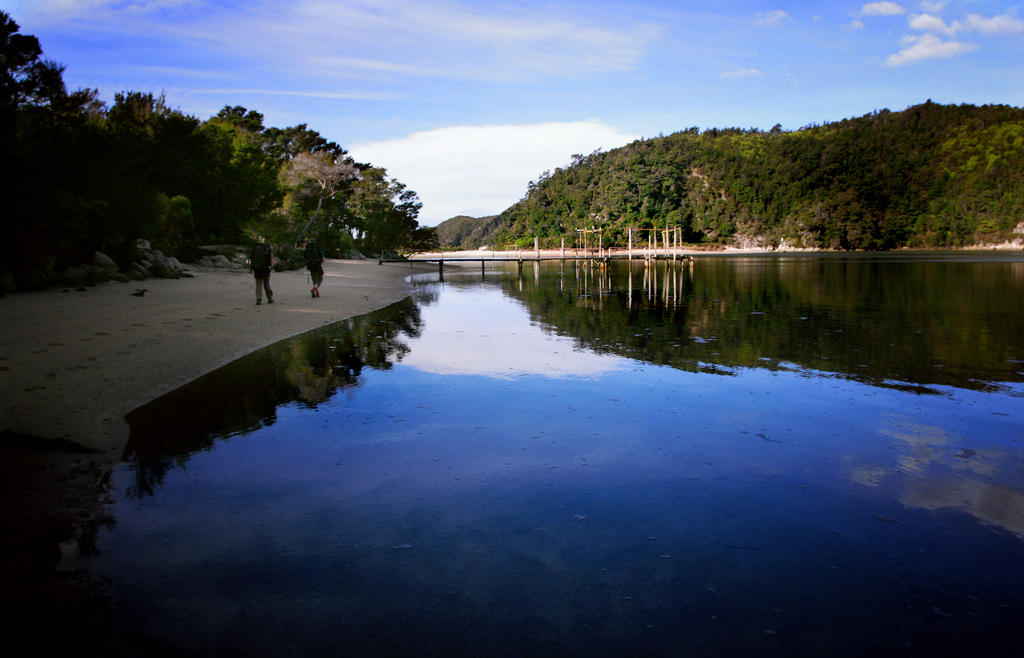
Torrent Bay Estuary

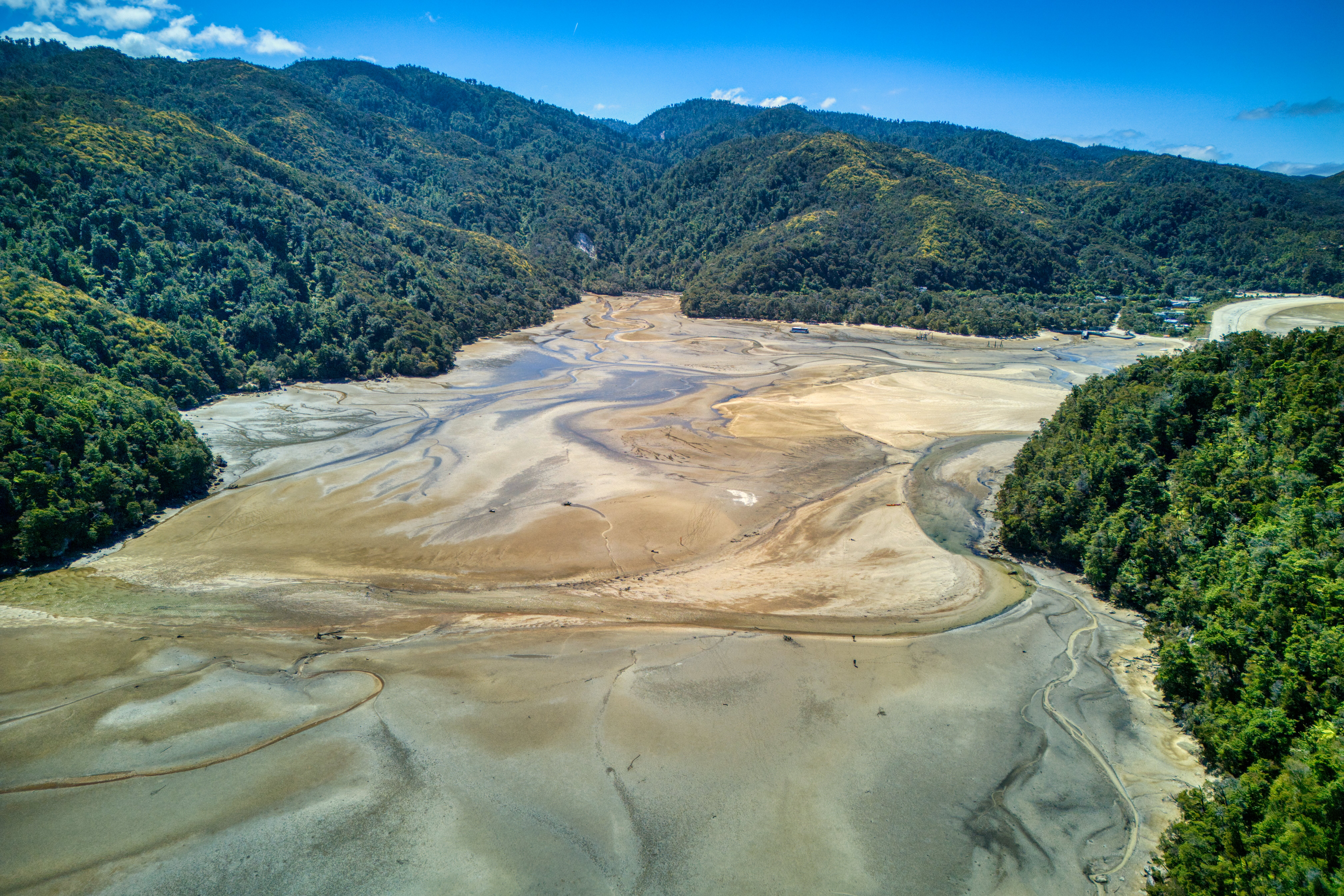
The Torrent Bay estuary in low tide

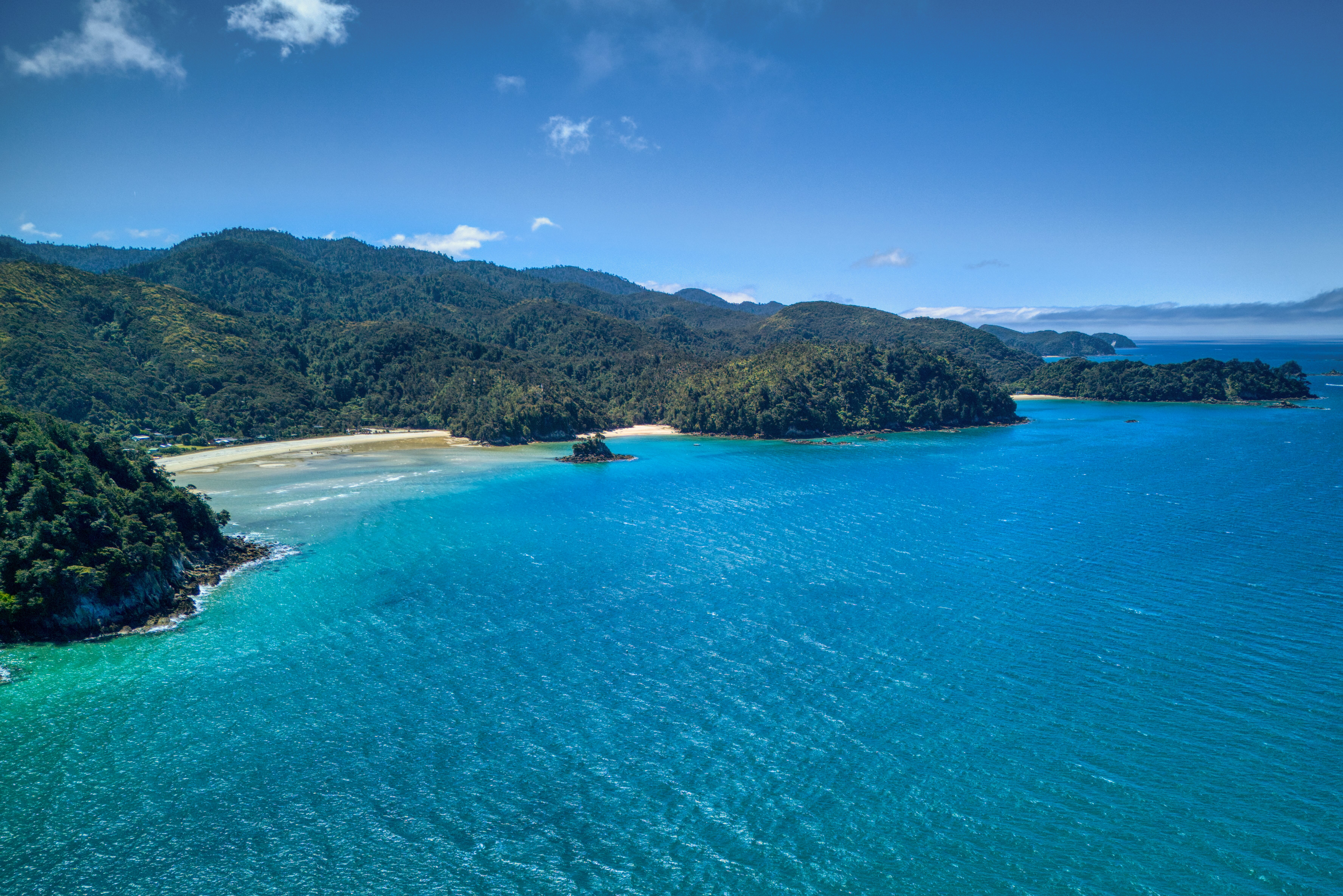
The Torrent Bay and the Ballon Rock
