= Mārahau =

Town in Tasman, New Zealand

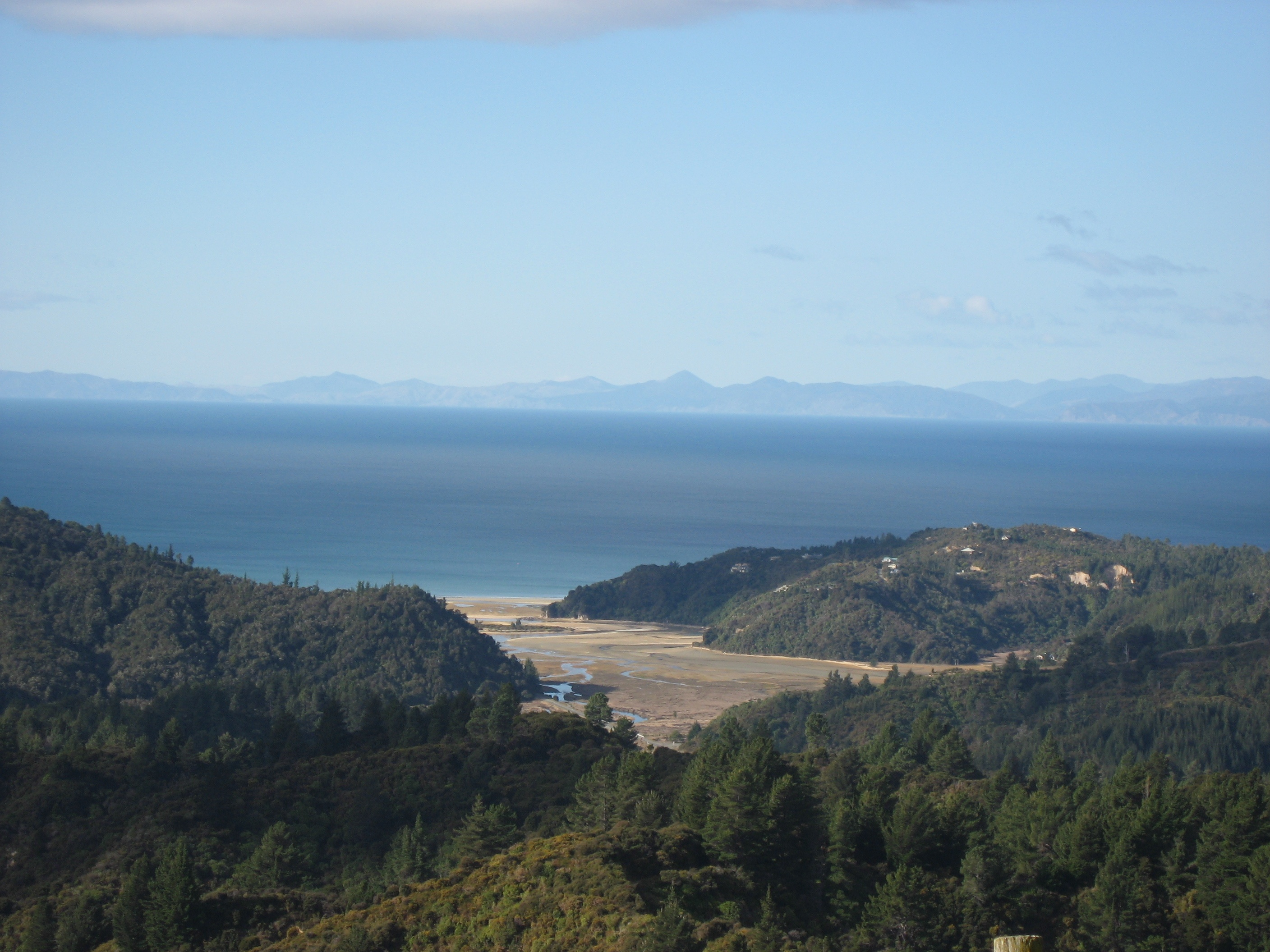

- Flag
- Interactive map of Mārahau
- Coordinates: 41°0′28″S 173°00′32″E
- Country: New Zealand
- Territorial authority: Tasman
- Ward: Motueka Ward
- Community: Motueka Community
- Electorates: West Coast-Tasman; Te Tai Tonga (Māori)

Government
  - Territorial authority: Tasman District Council
  - Mayor of Tasman: Tim King
  - West Coast-Tasman MP: Katie Milne
  - Te Tai Tonga MP: Mananui Ramsden

Area
  - Total: 6.14 km^{2} (2.37 sq mi)

Population (June 2025)
  - Total: 260
  - Density: 42/km^{2} (110/sq mi)
- Time zone: UTC+12 (NZST)
  - Summer (DST): UTC+13 (NZDT)
- Postal code: 7197
- Area code: 03

Mārahau is a village in the Tasman District of the South Island of New Zealand, approximately 19 kilometres (12 mi) north of Motueka. Its location on Tasman Bay and at the southern entrance of the Abel Tasman National Park makes it a popular holiday destination for those keen on outdoor activities. People access the Abel Tasman from Mārahau by tramping, kayaking and water taxi. In Mārahau itself, the beach offers sheltered and safe swimming, and horse trekking is popular throughout the busy summer season.

The Mārahau community has adopted their own flag, named Te Hau, designed by local artist Tim Wraight in 2012. The blue represents the ocean and sky, the green triangle represents Tākaka Hill, the golden sand bay is represented by the golden moon and the two stars represent the two islands, Adele and Fisherman.

== Demographics ==
Mārahau is described by Statistics New Zealand as a rural settlement. It covers 6.14 km^{2} (2.37 sq mi) and had an estimated population of 260 as of June 2025, with a population density of 42 people per km^{2}. It is part of the larger Kaiteriteri-Riwaka statistical area.

Historical population
Year	Pop.	±% p.a.
2006	186	—
2013	198	+0.90%
2018	231	+3.13%
2023	249	+1.51%

Mārahau had a population of 249 in the 2023 New Zealand census, an increase of 18 people (7.8%) since the 2018 census, and an increase of 51 people (25.8%) since the 2013 census. There were 117 males and 129 females in 105 dwellings. 1.2% of people identified as LGBTIQ+. The median age was 54.8 years (compared with 38.1 years nationally). There were 24 people (9.6%) aged under 15 years, 21 (8.4%) aged 15 to 29, 132 (53.0%) aged 30 to 64, and 72 (28.9%) aged 65 or older.

People could identify as more than one ethnicity. The results were 94.0% European (Pākehā), 7.2% Māori, 2.4% Pasifika, and 2.4% Asian. English was spoken by 96.4%, Māori by 1.2%, and other languages by 24.1%. No language could be spoken by 2.4% (e.g. too young to talk). The percentage of people born overseas was 34.9, compared with 28.8% nationally.

Religious affiliations were 25.3% Christian, 1.2% Islam, 1.2% Māori religious beliefs, 1.2% Buddhist, and 2.4% other religions. People who answered that they had no religion were 62.7%, and 7.2% of people did not answer the census question.

Of those at least 15 years old, 72 (32.0%) people had a bachelor's or higher degree, 99 (44.0%) had a post-high school certificate or diploma, and 51 (22.7%) people exclusively held high school qualifications. The median income was $33,400, compared with $41,500 nationally. 15 people (6.7%) earned over $100,000 compared to 12.1% nationally. The employment status of those at least 15 was 96 (42.7%) full-time, 33 (14.7%) part-time, and 6 (2.7%) unemployed.
