= Abel Tasman Monument =

Monument in New Zealand

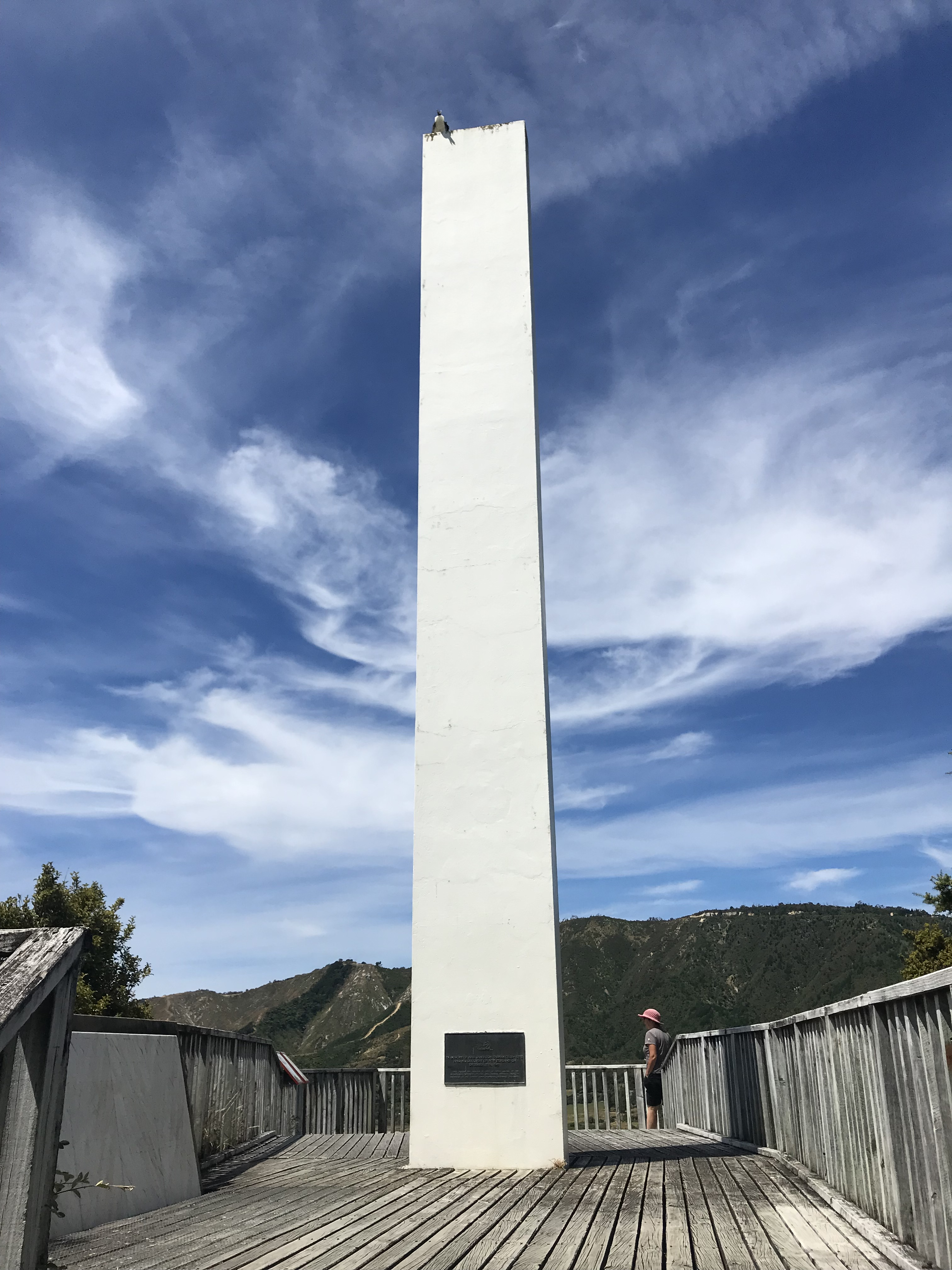
- Abel Tasman Monument in 2022
- Interactive map of Abel Tasman Monument
- Location: Golden Bay, New Zealand
- Coordinates: 40.8212°S 172.9026°E
- Designer: Ernst Plischke
- Material: Concrete
- Height: 9.1 m (30 ft)
- Opening date: 18 December 1942

The Abel Tasman Monument is a memorial to the first recorded contact between Europeans—led by the Dutch explorer Abel Tasman—and Māori in New Zealand's Golden Bay on 18 and 19 December 1642. It was unveiled on the tercentenary of the encounter by the prime minister, several government ministers, and a Dutch delegation. The monument, originally referred to as the Abel Tasman Memorial, was designed by the architect Ernst Plischke as an abstracted sail, and consists of a large concrete monolith painted white. Located on a bluff at Tarakohe just east of Pōhara, the land for the monument was gifted by the Golden Bay Cement Company. The dignitaries opened the Abel Tasman National Park the following day and the area holding the monument is part of the national park. As was typical for the 1940s, the original inscription focused on the European experience only and overlooked the Māori perspective, demonstrating Western-centric systemic bias. The monument is one of New Zealand's National Memorials.

== Historical context ==
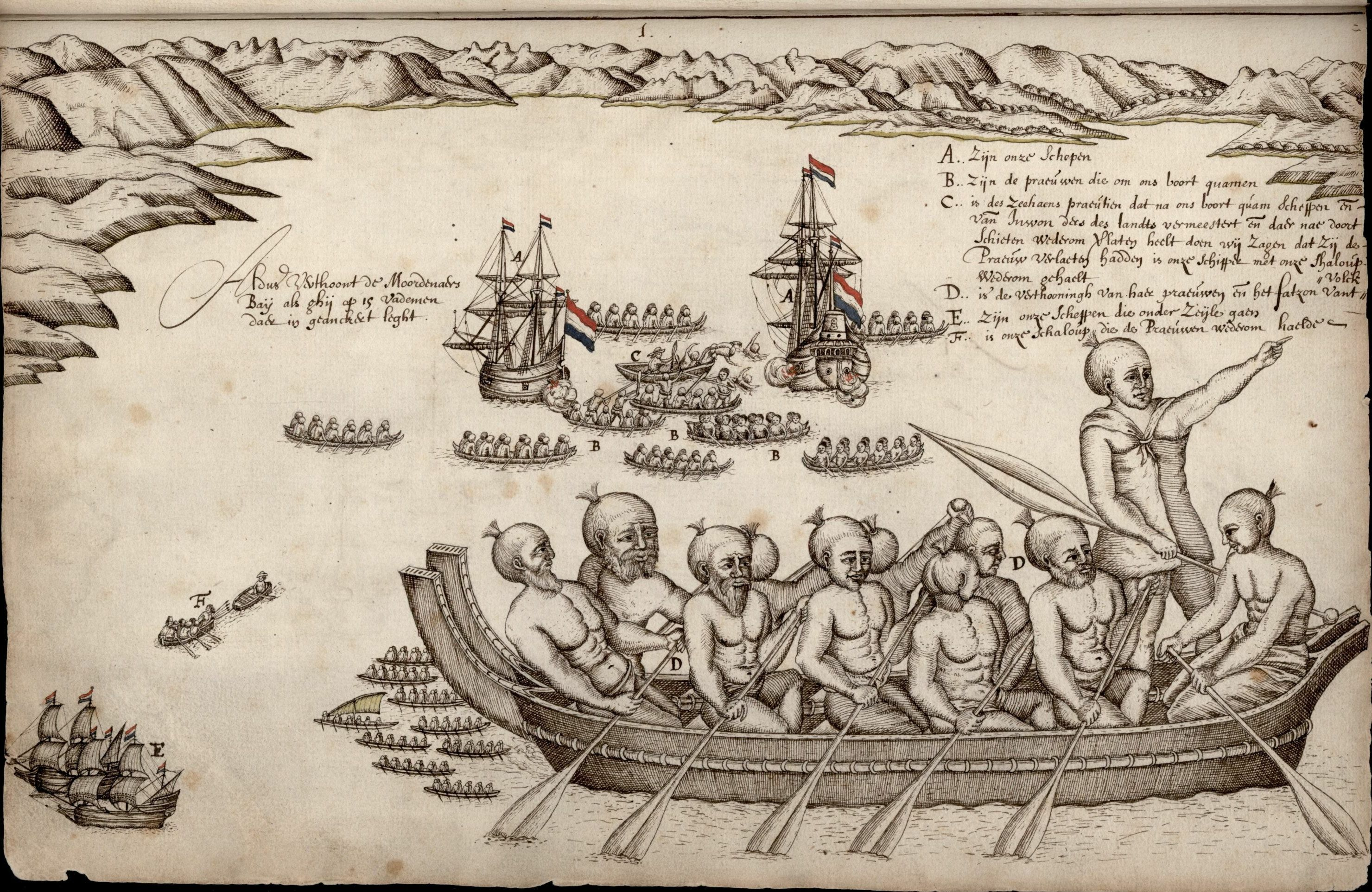
Members of the Ngāti Tūmatakōkiri taua (war party), drawn by Isaack Gilsemans aboard Abel Tasman's voyage (1642)

The Dutch explorer Abel Tasman first encountered New Zealand (Aotearoa), which he named Staten Landt, on 13 December 1642. Tasman was in the service of the Dutch East India Company, a corporation with quasi-governmental powers, including the ability to wage war, negotiate treaties, and establish colonies. Tasman had 110 men under his command and was travelling with two ships, the Heemskerck and the Zeehaen. It is believed that the ships were off Punakaiki and if so, it was the Paparoa Range that they saw. On 18 December, they sailed around Farewell Spit (Tuhuroa) and into Golden Bay (Mohua), where they saw many fires on land. They anchored in Golden Bay for the night, near where the Abel Tasman Monument is now located, intending to go on land to take on water and provisions the next day. The local iwi (tribe) was Ngāti Tūmatakōkiri and they came out in two waka (canoes) to inspect the visitors and their ships. The Māori used ritual challenges including blowing their pūtātara (a type of trumpet) and the Dutch responded by blowing their own trumpets and firing a cannon. The cannon frightened the Māori and they retreated to the shore.

The next morning, on 19 December, several waka came out to the ships. When a boat transferred some Dutch sailors from one ship to the other, they were rammed by the Māori and attacked, and four sailors lost their life. Tasman ordered his ships to leave Golden Bay. They were followed by eleven waka, with a man standing in a large waka holding a white flag. As the waka came closer, the sailors shot and killed the man. Tasman named Golden Bay Murderers ("Moordenaers") Bay and thus gave it its original European name. (Note: The name later changed to Massacre Bay but was still in reference to Tasman's visit; it became Coal Bay after the discovery of coal at Tākaka in 1842 and then Golden Bay after gold was found in the 1850s.) Tasman and his men sailed north. On 5 January, they attempted to land at Manawatāwhi / Three Kings Islands but were thwarted by a rocky shore, high surf, and several dozen Māori who threw stones at them from a cliff top. Tasman left for Tonga without landing in New Zealand.

Golden Bay Museum, located in Tākaka some 12 kilometres (7.5 mi) from the monument, has a permanent display covering Tasman's journey and a diorama showing the waka ramming the Dutch sailors' boat. Tasman's two ships had anchored some four kilometres (2.5 mi) north of the Tata Islands, which are located at the western side of Wainui Bay.

== Commission ==
The New Zealand Government had first considered arrangements for the tercentenary of Tasman's visit in June 1938 but planning was interrupted by the outbreak of World War II. A possible memorial was discussed by the Pohara Domain Board at its October 1941 meeting. It was decided that a memorial should be erected at Pōhara Beach as that was the closest populated place to where the encounter between Dutch sailors and Māori had happened; Pōhara Beach is four kilometres (2.5 mi) south-west of the Tata Islands. The Domain Board resolved to convey their view to the Department of Internal Affairs. Within days, the Department of Internal Affairs sent its historian, John Beaglehole, to Golden Bay to explore the area for a suitable site for a memorial. It was said that Beaglehole favoured a site near the band rotunda at Pōhara Beach or a site at Ligar Bay.

== Design and construction ==
Design plan view that shows how the monument integrates with the surrounding landscape and that the original layout used tiles, now covered by timber decking

The site chosen for the monument was a bluff in Tarakohe that overlooks Ligar Bay and Tata Beach, on land donated by the adjacent Golden Bay Cement Company. As Bill Parry, the Minister of Internal Affairs, explained in his speech at the monument's unveiling, the site where Tasman came closest to land was "past Wainui" and too difficult to access. (Note: Research undertaken since has put Tasman's anchorage north of the Tata Islands, which is before Wainui.)

The monument was designed by Ernst Plischke from the Department of Housing Construction. He was an Austrian architect who had fled his country after its annexation by Nazi Germany as he had socialist links and was married to a Jew. When he arrived in New Zealand, he had an international reputation as a leading modernist architect.

Plischke's initial design concept for the monument showed Tasman's ships in full sail and he had over twenty designs rejected. Eventually, he achieved the final abstracted form of a white concrete tapering column, 9.1 metres (30 ft) in height, referencing the Greek funerary stele. Alongside the monument was a low concrete plinth topped by a marble tablet, sourced from Tākaka Hill, with an inscription engraved in lettering designed by art historian Janet Paul. The whole area was paved with a grid of large quadratic concrete slabs. The design follows the principles of modern architecture by "rejecting ornament and embracing minimalism", with Plischke's approach minimalist and strongly geometrical, in contrast to the wild and natural surroundings. The inscription on the marble slab reads:

Remember Abel Janszoon Tasman a commander in the service of the Dutch East India Company who discovered New Zealand & on 18th & 19th December 1642 anchored in this bay. Remember also Frans Jacobszoon Visscher Pilot Major & the company of the ships Heemskerck and Zeehaen. Also Jan Tyssen of Oue-ven. Tobias Pietersz of Delft. Jan Isbrantsz & a sailor of name unknown killed by the natives of this country.

The actual erection of the monument was first reported less than a month before the tercentenary, after land clearing had been observed and rumours of the land donation started circulating. At the time, it was speculated that in an ironic twist, the 30-foot-high (9.1 m) concrete column would have to be manufactured with cement imported from the North Island as the Golden Bay Cement Company did not produce quick-drying cement. In the end, the cement of the Golden Bay Cement Company was used and given for the project as a gift.

== Unveiling ==
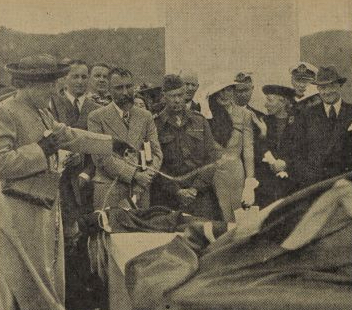
Julia Skinner unveils the inscription at the base of the monument on 18 December 1942

The Dutch East Indies sent a delegation of four men to New Zealand for the tercentenary. Charles van der Plas was the personal representative for Queen Wilhelmina. Major General L. P. van Temmen (representing the Royal Netherlands East Indies Army), J. van Holst Pellekaan (representing the Department of Commerce) and Lieutenant Commander Huibert Quispel (representing the Royal Netherlands Navy) were the other three and they arrived in New Zealand on 8 December 1942. They were hosted for their New Zealand visit and tour by Bill Parry, the Minister of Internal Affairs.

The unveiling ceremony was held on 18 December 1942. The Dutch delegation was present and the government was represented by Peter Fraser in his role as Prime Minister, Parry as Minister of Internal Affairs, and Jim Barclay as Minister of Lands. The unveiling was performed by Julia Skinner, the wife of local Motueka electorate MP Jerry Skinner (who himself was fighting in the North African campaign at the time). Eruera Tirikatene, MP for the Southern Maori electorate, led the Māori delegation. The chairman of directors of the Golden Bay Cement Company formally handed over the deed for the gifted land. Prior to the event, the delegation had been hosted by the Takaka town board and the Takaka county council for a light lunch and after the unveiling, the official delegation was hosted by the Golden Bay Cement Company for afternoon tea. The delegation then travelled over Tākaka Hill and were welcomed by the mayor of Motueka, Walter Eginton, and the councillors.

The Abel Tasman National Park was opened on the following day, with the opening carried out by the Governor-General, Cyril Newall, and the delegation increased by additional ministers of the Crown. The land gifted by the Golden Bay Cement Company and the Tata Islands are physically detached from the Abel Tasman National Park but are part of it.

== Alterations ==
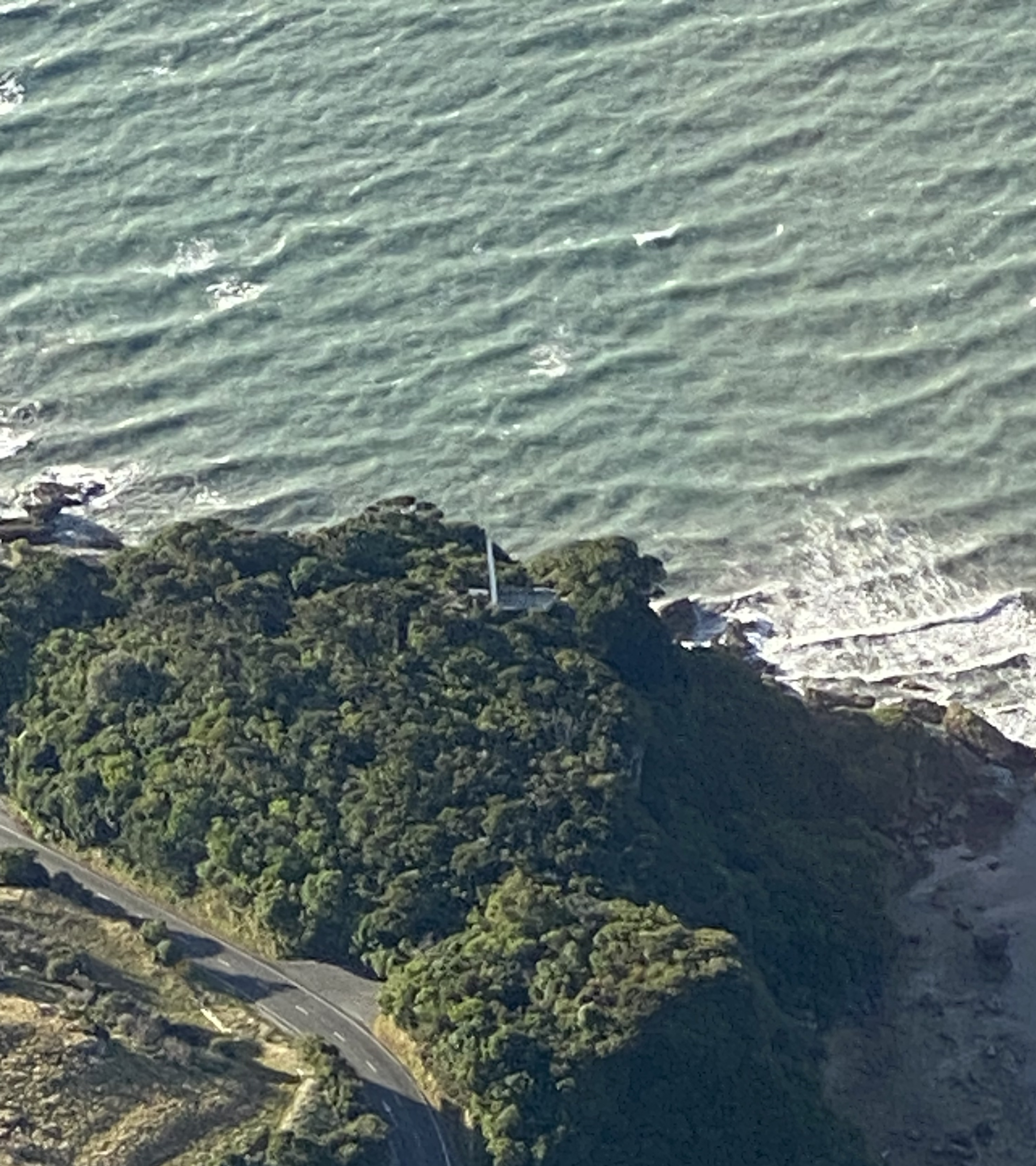
Aerial view of the monument (centre) showing its setting in native bush at a cliff

As was typical for the 1940s, the original inscription focused on the European experience. This Pākehā-centric (Note: The most common definition for Pākehā is "white New Zealander") systemic bias of not covering the Māori perspective was entrenched in New Zealand. These attitudes changed in later decades. Robert Jenkin, who built the diorama of the 1642 meeting of the races and is considered an expert on Tasman's visit of Golden Bay, believes that Pākehā and Māori views of history became more inclusive starting in the 1960s.

Fifty years after the unveiling, the then-Queen Beatrix of the Netherlands visited the monument. A new interpretation panel was installed for the occasion and the Department of Conservation comments on the difference between the new and old interpretation signs, revealing "how our perspective on how Abel Tasman's visit had changed in the intervening 50 years".

A number of changes have been made to the memorial since its opening in 1942. The site is now covered with timber decking over the large concrete pavers, and timber balustrades have been added around the perimeter. Brass plaques gifted by the Dutch royal family have been affixed near the base of the concrete pylon, and the inscribed marble tablet has been turned from horizontal to stand almost vertically. In 2006, the monument received an enduring architecture award in the New Zealand Institute of Architects Nelson–Marlborough regional awards. The jury called the memorial a "national treasure", but urged the Department of Conservation to remove the timber platform to reveal the original paving design, saying that "New Zealand would then have an internationally significant example of early Modernist architecture". The government has registered the monument as one of the National Memorials. As of 2023, there are 21 National Memorials, and this is the only one administered by the Department of Conservation; the other monuments are the responsibility of the Ministry for Culture and Heritage.

== Access ==
Access is via Abel Tasman Drive from Pōhara towards Tōtaranui. The monument is just past Port Tarakohe, with signs at a car park advising of the location. It takes a five-minute walk to get from the car park to the monument and, since the land is formally part of a national park, dogs are not permitted.
