= Ligar Bay =

Locality in Tasman District, New Zealand

Coordinates: 40.820°S 172.907°E

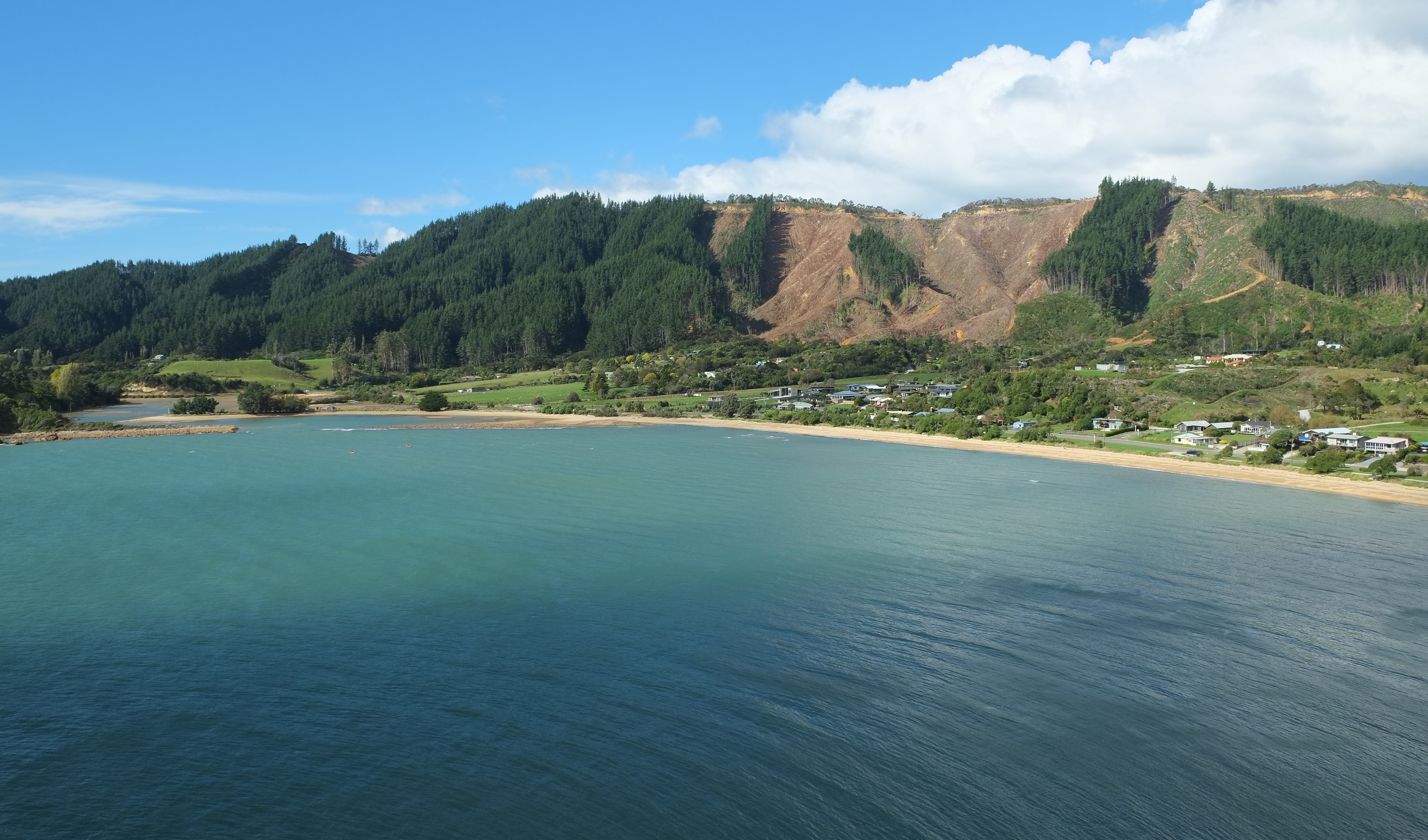
Ligar Bay as seen from the Abel Tasman Monument

Ligar Bay is a bay and small coastal settlement in Golden Bay / Mohua. It is located between Port Tarakohe and Tata Beach. It is approximately 12 kilometres (7.5 mi) north-east of Tākaka. It is mostly made up of holiday homes.

The settlement is named for Charles Ligar, the second surveyor-general of New Zealand (1842–1856). Ligar Bay's beach is more sheltered than that of Tata Beach, but also much flatter. At low tide, there are extensive mudflats and rockpools.

In the 2011 Golden Bay and Nelson floods, Ligar Bay was badly hit by landslides.

One of the baches in Ligar Bay is built to resemble a lighthouse.

== Demographics ==
Stats NZ describes Ligar Bay and Tata Beach as a rural settlement. Demographics are covered at Tata Beach#Demographics.
