= Sams Creek =

Sams Creek may refer to:

- Sams Creek (Peruque Creek tributary), Missouri
- Sams Creek (West Virginia)
- Sams Creek (New Zealand)
