= National Memorials (New Zealand) =

National Memorials are decided upon by the New Zealand Government for those events, relationships, or persons who have had a "significant impact" on the country. There are 14 National Memorials in New Zealand and a further 8 overseas. The Ministry for Culture and Heritage (MCH) is responsible for 20 of those National Memorials. The remaining National Memorials, the Abel Tasman Monument, was transferred from MCH to the Department of Conservation in 2020 and the George Forbes National Memorial is under the responsibility of Lincoln University.

== Domestic National Memorials ==
There are 14 National Memorials located in New Zealand:

Name	Image	Location	Description
Abel Tasman Monument		Tarakohe 40.8212°S 172.9026°E	The Abel Tasman Monument is a memorial to the first recorded contact between Europeans—led by the Dutch explorer Abel Tasman—and Māori in New Zealand's Golden Bay on 18 and 19 December 1642. It was unveiled on the tercentenary of the encounter by the prime minister, several government ministers, and a Dutch delegation. The monument was designed by the architect Ernst Plischke as an abstracted sail, and consists of a large concrete monolith painted white. Located on a bluff at Tarakohe just east of Pōhara, the land for the monument was gifted by the Golden Bay Cement Company. The dignitaries opened the Abel Tasman National Park the following day and the area holding the monument is part of the national park. As was typical for the 1940s, the original inscription focused on the European experience only and overlooked the Māori perspective, demonstrating Western-centric systemic bias.
Atatürk Memorial, Wellington		Wellington	
Canterbury Earthquake National Memorial		Christchurch	
Coates Memorial Church		Matakohe	
Cook Monument, Thames		Thames	
Fraser Memorial, Karori Cemetery		Wellington	
Peter Fraser Statue		Wellington	
Holyoake Memorial		Wellington	
Kirk Memorial		Waimate	
Massey Memorial		Wellington	
Pukeahu National War Memorial Park		Wellington	
Savage Memorial		Auckland	
Seddon Memorial		Wellington	
Tangiwai Memorial, Karori Cemetery		Wellington	The Tangiwai Memorial at Karori Cemetery was designed by Gordon Wilson in his role as government architect. The memorial was opened on 26 March 1957.
George Forbes National Memorial		Lincoln Canterbury	The George Forbes National Memorial was opened by Governor-General Viscount Cobham on 11 August 1960. It was originally constructed as a memorial building containing the library for Lincoln College (now Lincoln University).

== International National Memorials ==
Most of the National Memorials outside of New Zealand are war memorials:

Name	Image	Location	Description
New Zealand battlefield memorial and New Zealand Memorial to the Missing, peninsula of Chunuk Bair		Chunuk Bair, Turkey	In honour of the soldiers of the New Zealand Expeditionary Force in the Battle of Chunuk Bair of 8 August 1915
Jean Batten Memorial, Majorca			
Le Quesnoy, France			
Messines Ridge (New Zealand) Memorial		Messines Ridge British Cemetery, near the town of Mesen, Belgium	World War I memorial, listing 827 officers and men of the New Zealand Expeditionary Force with no known grave who died in or near Messines (now Mesen) in 1917 and 1918. This period included the Battle of Messines (1917) and Battle of Messines (1918).
Longueval, France (Caterpillar Valley Cemetery)			
New Zealand Memorial in Korea			
New Zealand War Memorial, London		London, England, on the Piccadilly side of Hyde Park Corner	Officially named "Southern Stand", established to commemorate "the enduring bond between New Zealand and the United Kingdom", and the lives lost by the two countries during the two World Wars.
New Zealand Memorial 's Gravenstafel		's Graventafel (formerly Gravenstafel) Belgium	New Zealand Memorial, commemorating the Battle of Passchendaele or 3rd Battle of Ypres, specifically the capture of Gravenstafel by the New Zealand Division during the Battle of Broodseinde, 4 October 1917. Also called New Zealand Memorial, Passendale/Passchendaele.
