= Mount Burnett (New Zealand) =

Mountain in New Zealand

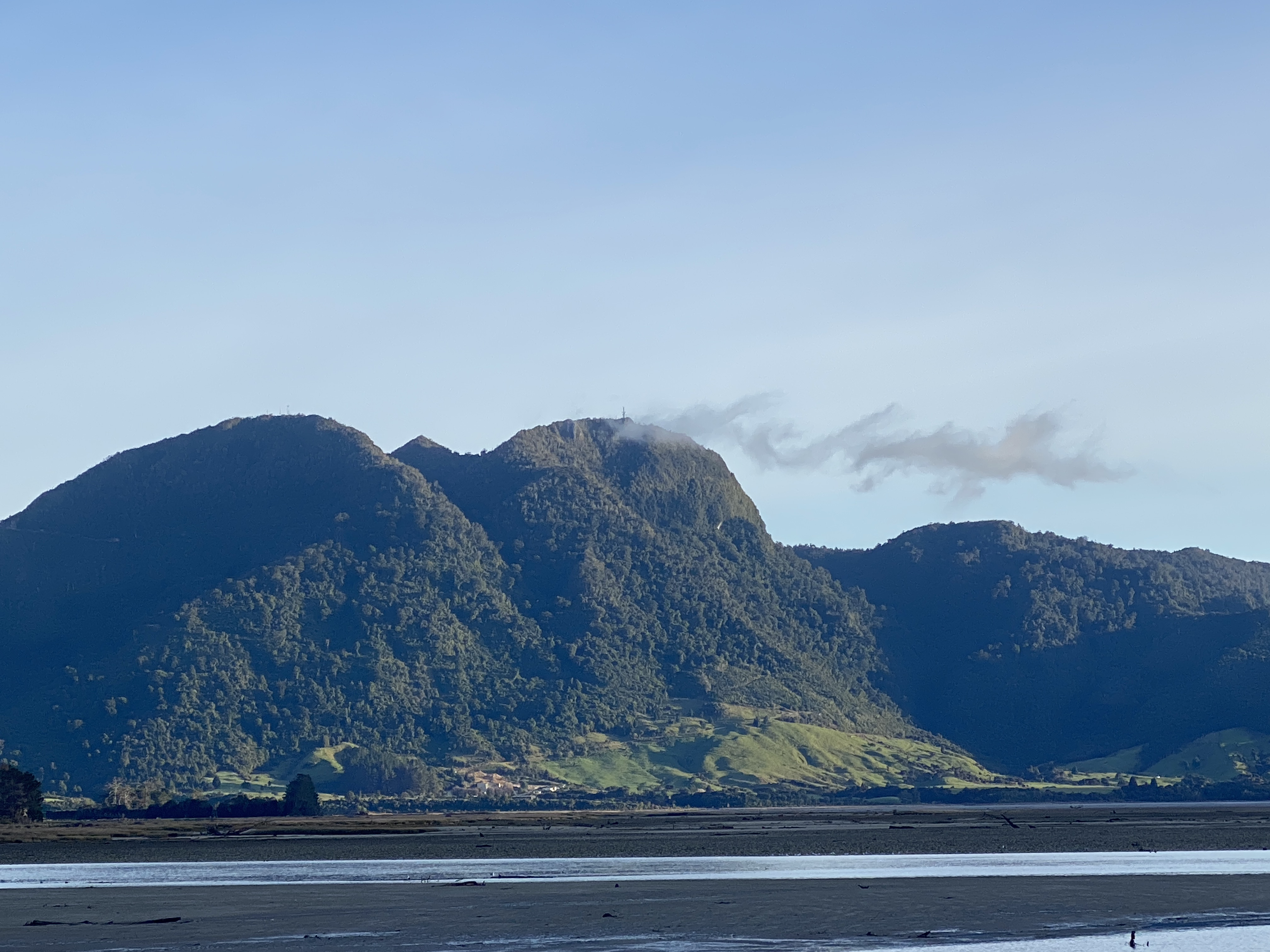
- Mount Burnett (centre)

Highest point
- Elevation: 641 m (2,103 ft)
- Coordinates: 40°38′26″S 172°38′24″E

Geography
- Location within New Zealand
- Location: Tasman District, New Zealand
- Parent range: Burnett Range

Mount Burnett is a 641-metre (2,103 ft) hill surrounded by, but outside of, Kahurangi National Park, (Note: There are two other mountains in the South Island of this name and both are significantly higher than this one: Mount Burnett in Fiordland at 1,270 metres or 4,170 feet and Mount Burnett in the Southern Alps at 2,032 metres or 6,667 feet.) in Golden Bay / Mohua, New Zealand. An open-cast dolomite mine is operated by Sollys in this location.

== Location ==
Mount Burnett has given its name to the Burnett Range, the range that forms the north-west border of the valley in which the Aorere River flows. At 641 metres (2,103 ft), it is not the highest peak (there is an unnamed peak of 678 metres or 2,224 feet in the range) but it is the highest named peak. The locality at the foot of Mount Burnett on the Aorere River flats is known as Ferntown. The nearest sizeable settlement is Collingwood to the south-east of Mount Burnett.

== Geography ==
The mountain hosts an unusual geography, and a number of species of shrubs and sedge are endemic to this mountain, and it is host to a large population of the critically endangered Powelliphanta gilliesi gilliesi subspecies of giant land snails.

== Geology and mining ==
Geological surveys by European colonists identified the presence of the raw materials needed for hydraulic cement in Golden Bay / Mohua. In 1882, a cement works was established in Ferntown. This was done by the company that operated the coal mine at Mount Burnett. In the following year, the company imported machinery for the large-scale production of Portland cement but soon afterwards, it ran out of capital and the cement production was stopped.

Mount Burnett is home to an open-cast dolomite mine, operated by Sollys, a local Golden Bay company. The Mount Burnett dolomite mine is the only source of the mineral, an important agricultural fertiliser, in New Zealand. The mine employs about 20 people. When Kahurangi National Park was formed in 1996, Mount Burnett was excluded from the national park because of these mining interests; another exclusion for mineral resource reasons is the area around Sams Creek. Some dolomite is shipped via Port Tarakohe. An extension to the mine was declined by the Minister for Conservation, Chris Carter, in 2004. Mining is opposed by environmental groups including Forest & Bird.
