= Anatoki Salmon =

Salmon farm and restaurant business in New Zealand

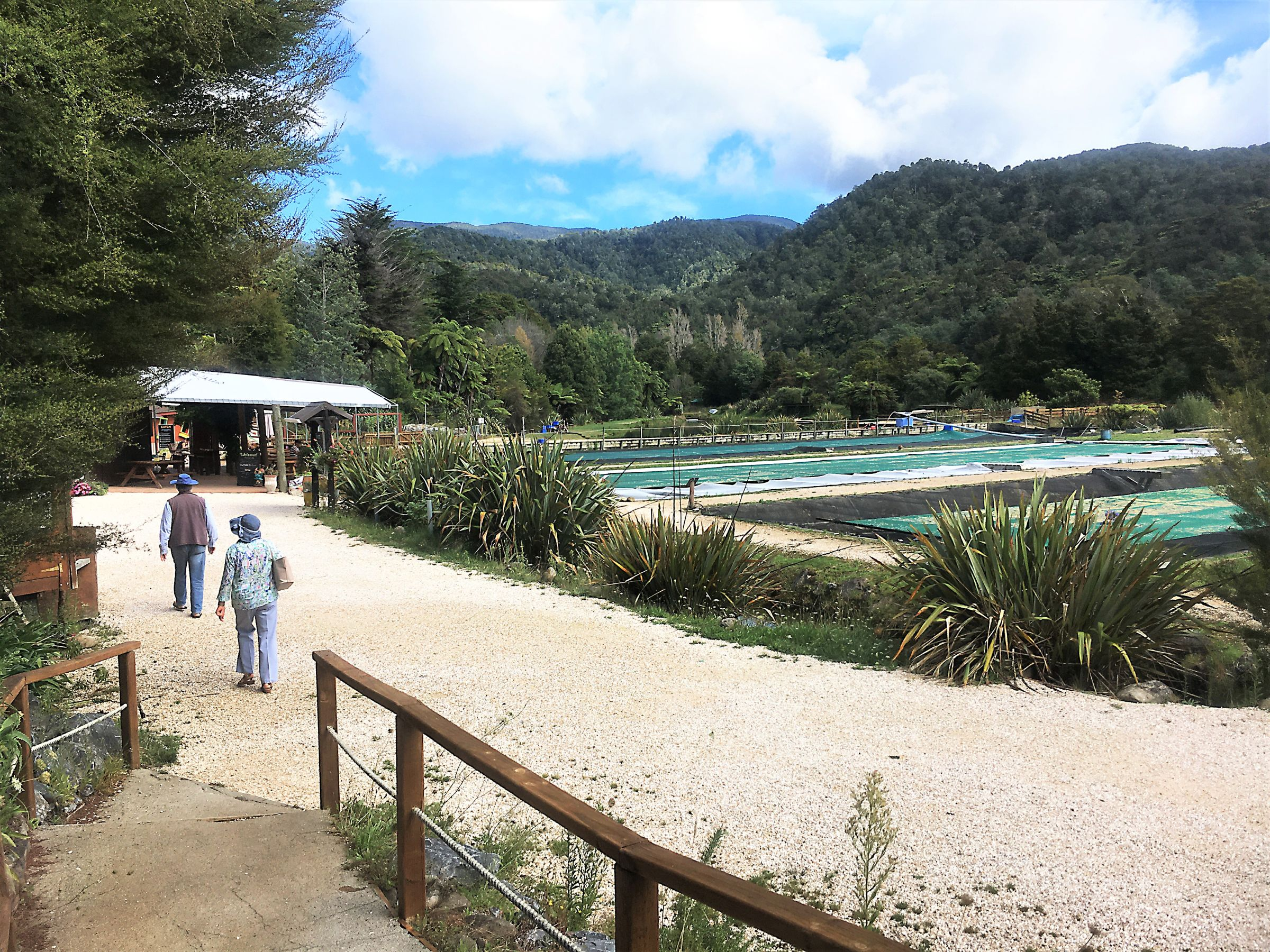
The salmon farm

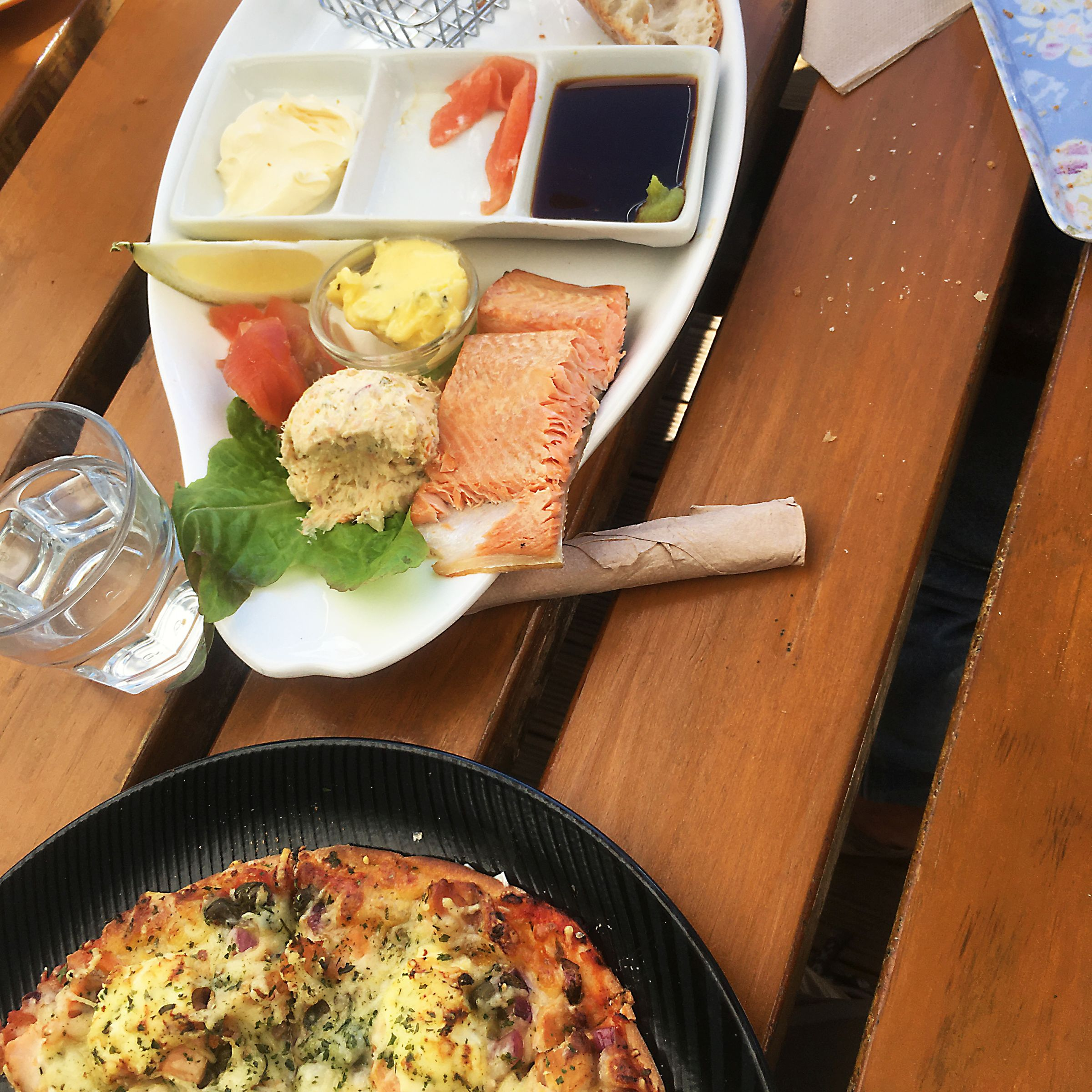
Meals prepared at the restaurant

Anatoki Salmon is a salmon farm and restaurant business located in Golden Bay / Mohua, New Zealand.

Anatoki Salmon is located in Anatoki Valley, 7 kilometres from Tākaka. The property has a salmon farm where customers can catch their own fish, a petting zoo including tame eels and a mini-golf course.

When the current owners, Gerda and Jan Dissel, purchased the property in 2005, it was a commercial salmon farm producing for the wholesale market. The couple developed the farm into a recreational fishing operation. In 2013 there was a major flood which caused a landslide and the subsequent loss of nearly all the salmon. The site was closed for three months and new salmon smolt had to be purchased and grown.
