= National monument =

Monument that represents the Nation, for any country

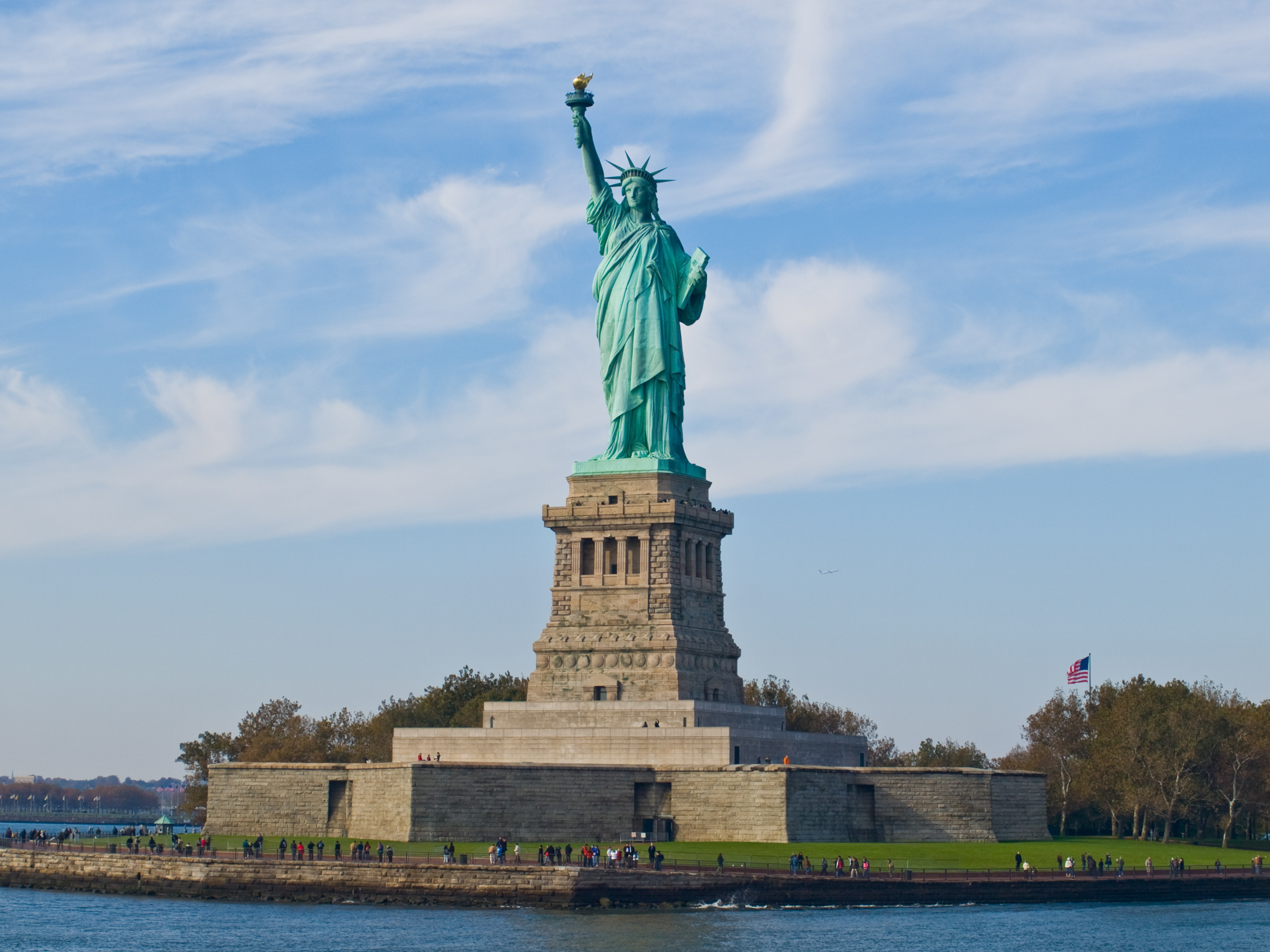
The Statue of Liberty in New York Harbor in the United States was designated a national monument in 1924 by former U.S. President Calvin Coolidge.

Monumen Nasional in Jakarta, Indonesia, built to commemorate the Indonesian struggle for independence

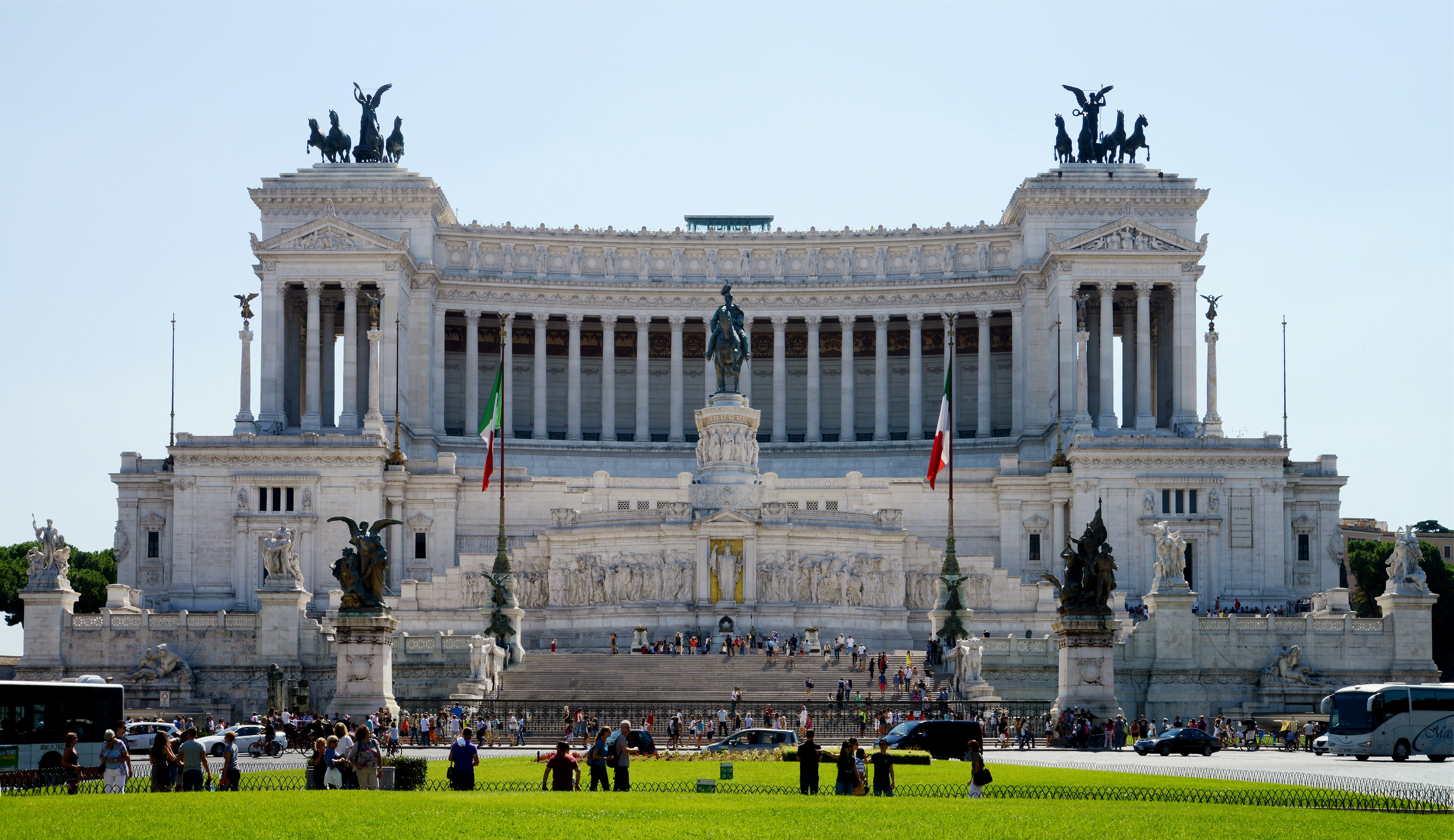
Altare della Patria in Rome, Italy, built to commemorate the Italian unification

A national monument is a monument constructed in order to commemorate something of importance to national heritage, such as a country's founding, independence, war, or the life and death of a historical figure. The term may also refer to a specific monument status, such as a national heritage site, by reason of their cultural importance rather than age). National monument status is usually granted to colossal symbols of national identity.

== Overview ==
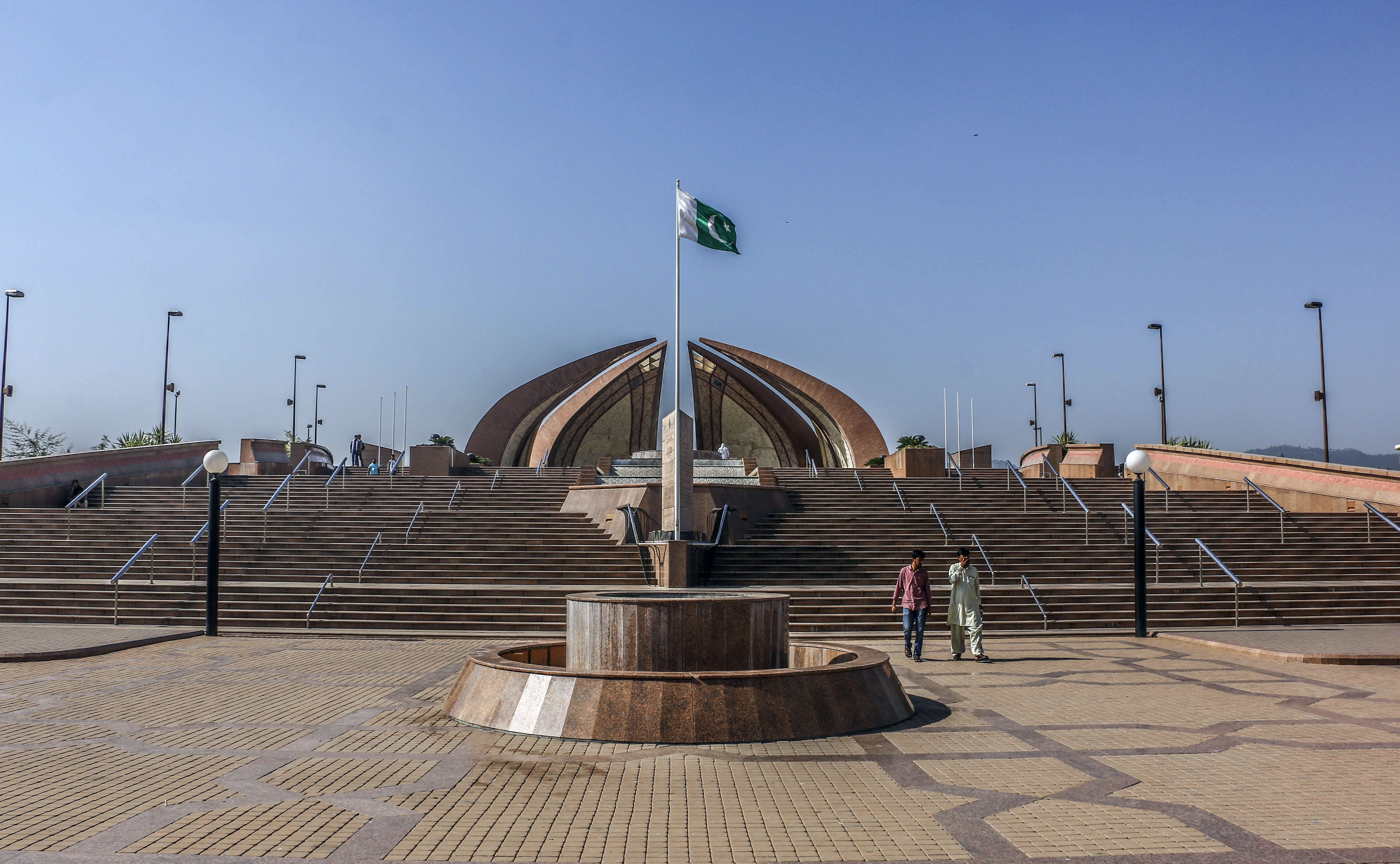
Pakistan Monument

Structures or areas deemed to be of national importance and afforded protection by the state are part of a country's cultural heritage. These national heritage sites are often called something different per country and are listed by national conservation societies. Romania has listed at least one plant as a national monument, Nymphaea lotus bar. thermalis.

== Examples ==
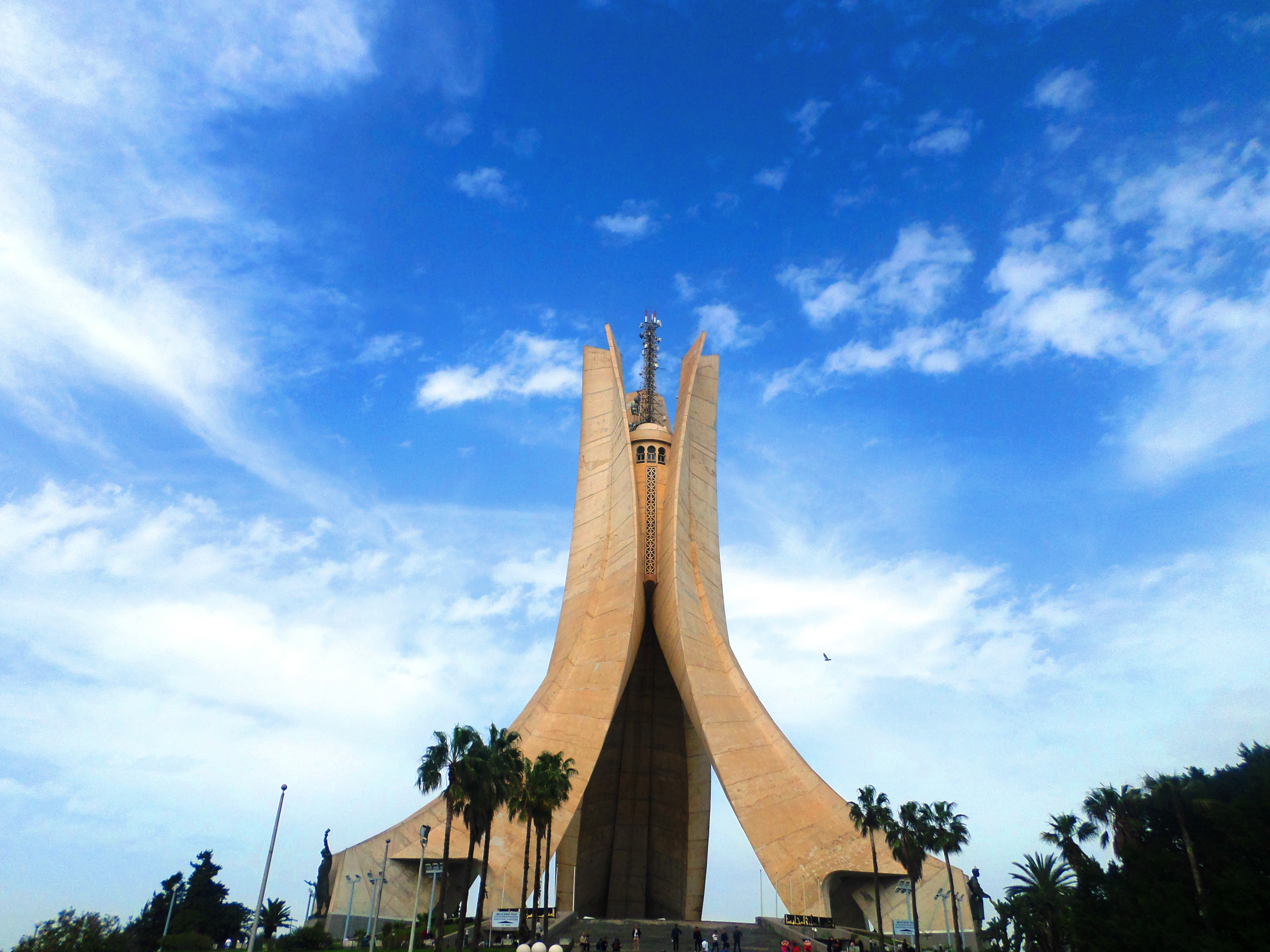
Maqam Echahid in Algiers, Algeria, an iconic concrete monument commemorating the Algerian war for independence

=== National monument ===
- Altare della Patria in Rome, Italy
- Maqam Echahid in Algiers, Algeria
- National Kaiser Wilhelm Monument in Berlin, Germany
- National Martyrs’ Memorial in Dhaka, Bangladesh
- National Monument in Jakarta, Indonesia
- National Monument in Kuala Lumpur, Malaysia
- National Monument in Amsterdam, Netherlands
- National Monument of Scotland in Edinburgh, Scotland
- Pakistan Monument in Islamabad, Pakistan
- Pobednik in Belgrade, Serbia
- Statue of Liberty in New York Harbor, United States

=== National heritage sites ===
- National heritage sites of South Africa
- National monuments of Colombia
- National monuments of Ireland
- National monuments of Portugal
- National monuments of Singapore
- National monuments of Spain
- National monuments of France
- National monument (United States)
  - List of national monuments of the United States
- List of national monuments of Bangladesh

== See also ==
- Cultural identity
- National icon
- National memorial (disambiguation)
- National myth
