= Sams Creek (New Zealand) =

Creek in Golden Bay, New Zealand

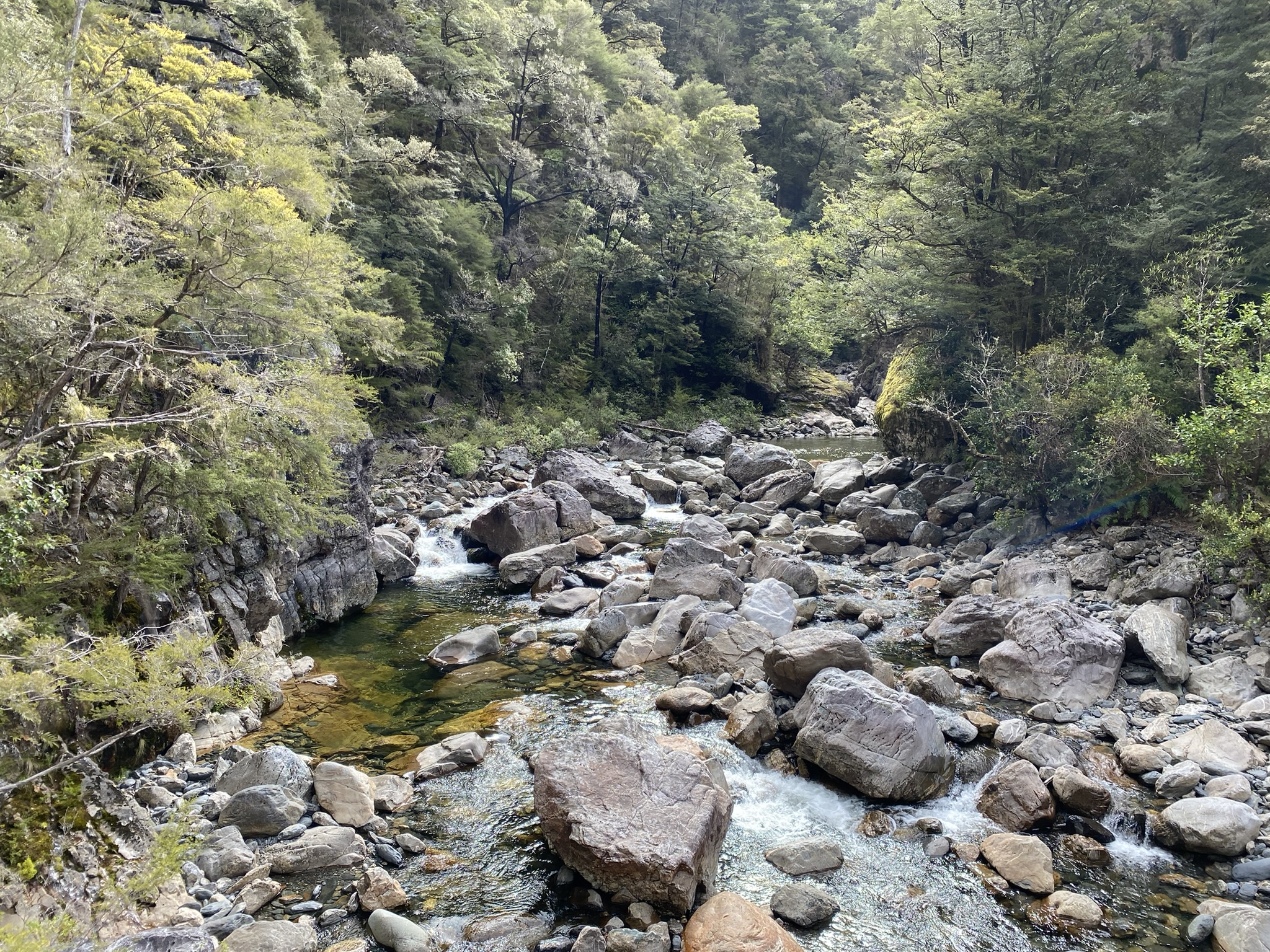
- Sams Creek as viewed from the road bridge
- Route of the Sams Creek
- Mouth of the Sams Creek Sams Creek (New Zealand) (South Island)

Location
- Country: New Zealand

Physical characteristics
- Mouth
  - location: Tākaka River
  - coordinates: 41°03′49″S 172°46′17″E
- Length: 20 km (12 mi)

Basin features
- Progression: Sams Creek → Tākaka River → Golden Bay / Mohua → Tasman Sea

Sams Creek, previously known as Rogers Creek or incorrectly as Roger Creek, is a stream in Golden Bay / Mohua in the Tasman District of New Zealand. Since 1974, the creek has had prominence due to gold mining proposals, and the area around Sams Creek was subsequently not included in Kahurangi National Park when it was formed in 1996.

== Location ==
Sams Creek is located on the south side of the Lockett Range. The lower reaches of the waterway are located on land that belongs to North-west Nelson Forest Park, with the land classed as conservation park under the Conservation Act 1987. The upper reaches are located in the Sams Creek conservation area, with the land classed as a "specially protected area".

Where Sams Creek originates, the Kill Devil Track follows the ridgeline of the Lockett Range. The track is located just outside of the boundary of Kahurangi National Park. A major tributary is Sams Creek Middle Branch. Sams Creek crosses the Cobb Road under a 14-metre-long (46 ft) bridge just before flowing into the Tākaka River.

== History and naming ==
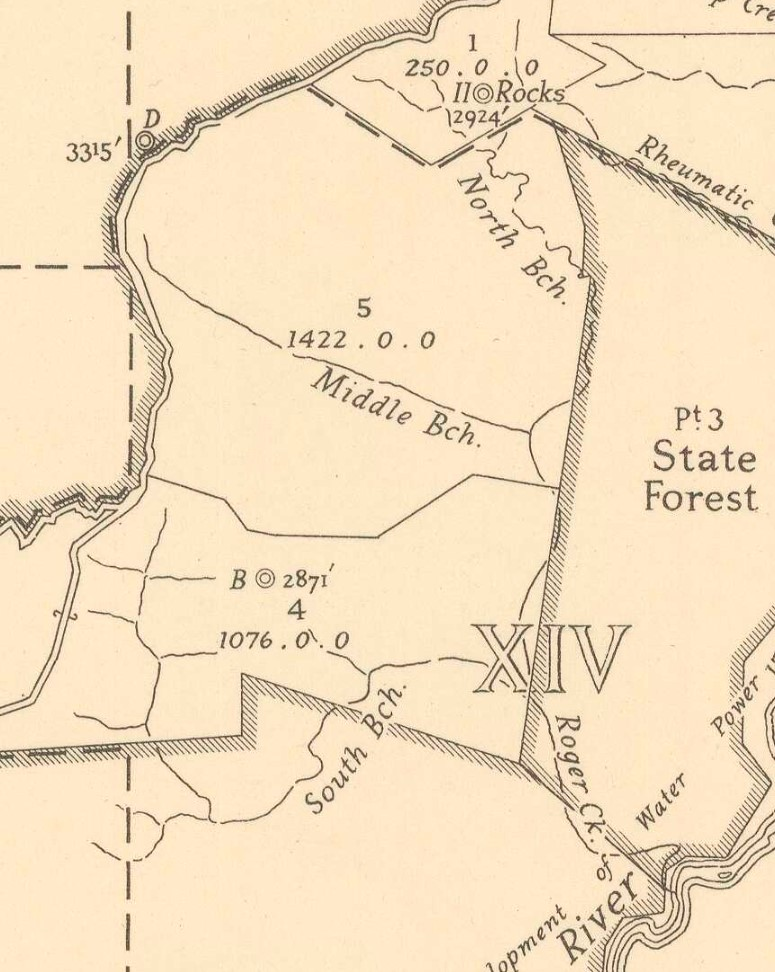
1953 cadastral map showing "Roger Creek" and its three tributaries: the South, Middle, and North branches

The original name of the creek was Rogers Creek, after the Rogers family who owned land and farmed at Upper Tākaka. The original settler was John Rogers (1829–1898), who was born in Shropshire and known as "Shropshire Jack". Rogers bought 495 acres (200 ha) of land, and the southwestern boundary of his land was formed by a creek that became known as Rogers Creek. His grandson, Fred Rogers, cut the track in 1936 on the true-left of the Tākaka River gorge from Upper Tākaka towards the Cobb River that became the Cobb Road.

Early maps of Golden Bay show the creek named as "Rogers Creek" and sometimes (incorrectly) as "Roger Creek". A late instance of this name is on the Tākaka cadastral map from 1953, prepared by the Department of Lands and Survey, with its tributaries labelled South, Middle, and North Branch.

An early use of "Sam's Creek"—at the time still with an apostrophe—was in 1887, when three people applied for an occupation license. Thus, the names "Rogers Creek" and "Sams Creek" were in parallel use for many decades. When Fred Rogers had cut the Cobb Road, the tender for a 14 m-long (46 ft) bridge referred to Sam's Creek in February 1937.

Beginning in 1920, forest parks were gazetted north of the Buller River. In the end, there were thirteen separate forest parks. The northernmost eight of those parks were gazetted as the North-west Nelson Forest Park in 1970. From the 1970s, mining companies explored within the forest park and that led to public requests to give the area the higher protection of a national park. Kahurangi National Park was formed in 1996, but the area around Sams Creek had been excluded from the park by 1993 for its mineral potential. Another exclusion for mineral potential was Mount Burnett. Macraes Mining had their 4,000 ha (9,900-acre) gold prospecting claim acknowledged and national park status was not applied. Eugenie Sage, who at the time worked for Forest & Bird, commented that "it's not appropriate to have this kind of development on the park's front door".

On 20 May 2026 the government's mineral regulator, New Zealand Petrol and Minerals, declined a permit by Australian mining company Siren Gold to establish a gold mine in the Sams Creek. The news was welcomed by local community groups including "Save Our Springs" and the Sams Creek Collective.

== Gallery ==
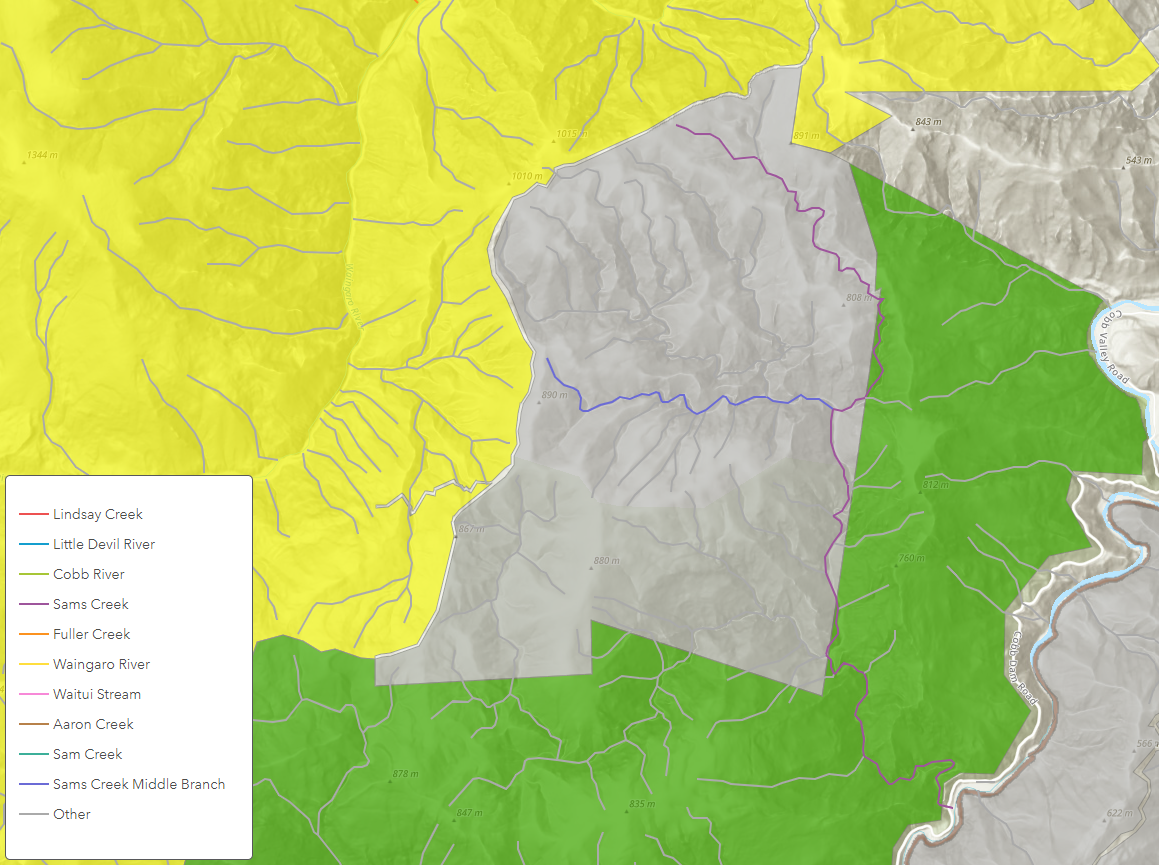
Sams Creek and land zones: yellow is Kahurangi National Park, grey is Sams Creek conservation area, green is North-west Nelson Forest Park, uncoloured is private land; purple line is Sams Creek and blue line is Sams Creek Middle Branch

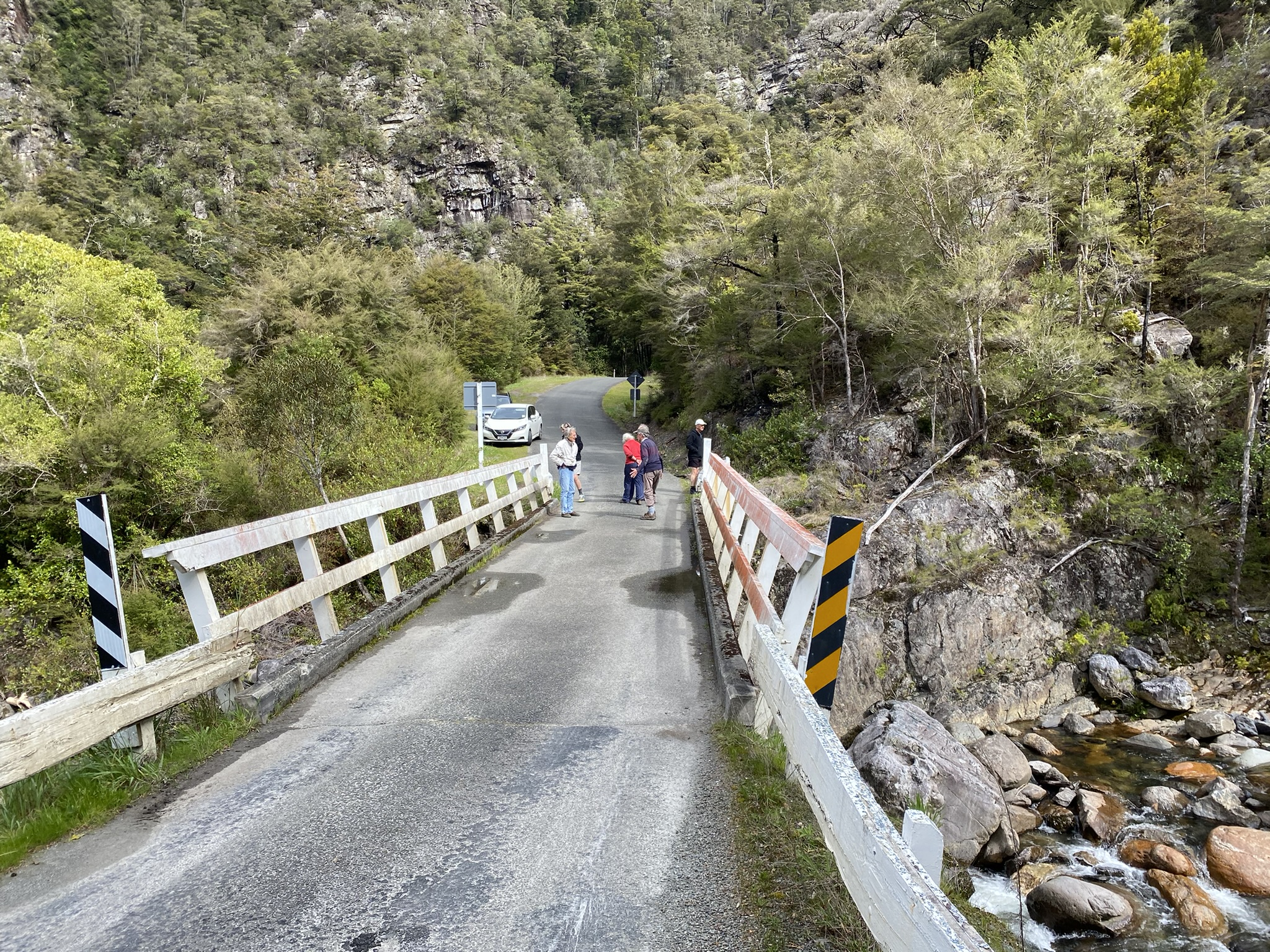
Cobb Dam Road Bridge near the mouth of Sams Creek
