= National memorial =

National memorial or National Memorial may refer to:

- National memorial (New Zealand)
- National Memorial (Thailand)
- National memorial (United States)

== See also ==
- National memorial museum
- National Martyrs' Memorial
- Memorial (disambiguation)
