= Tarakohe =

- Rural locality
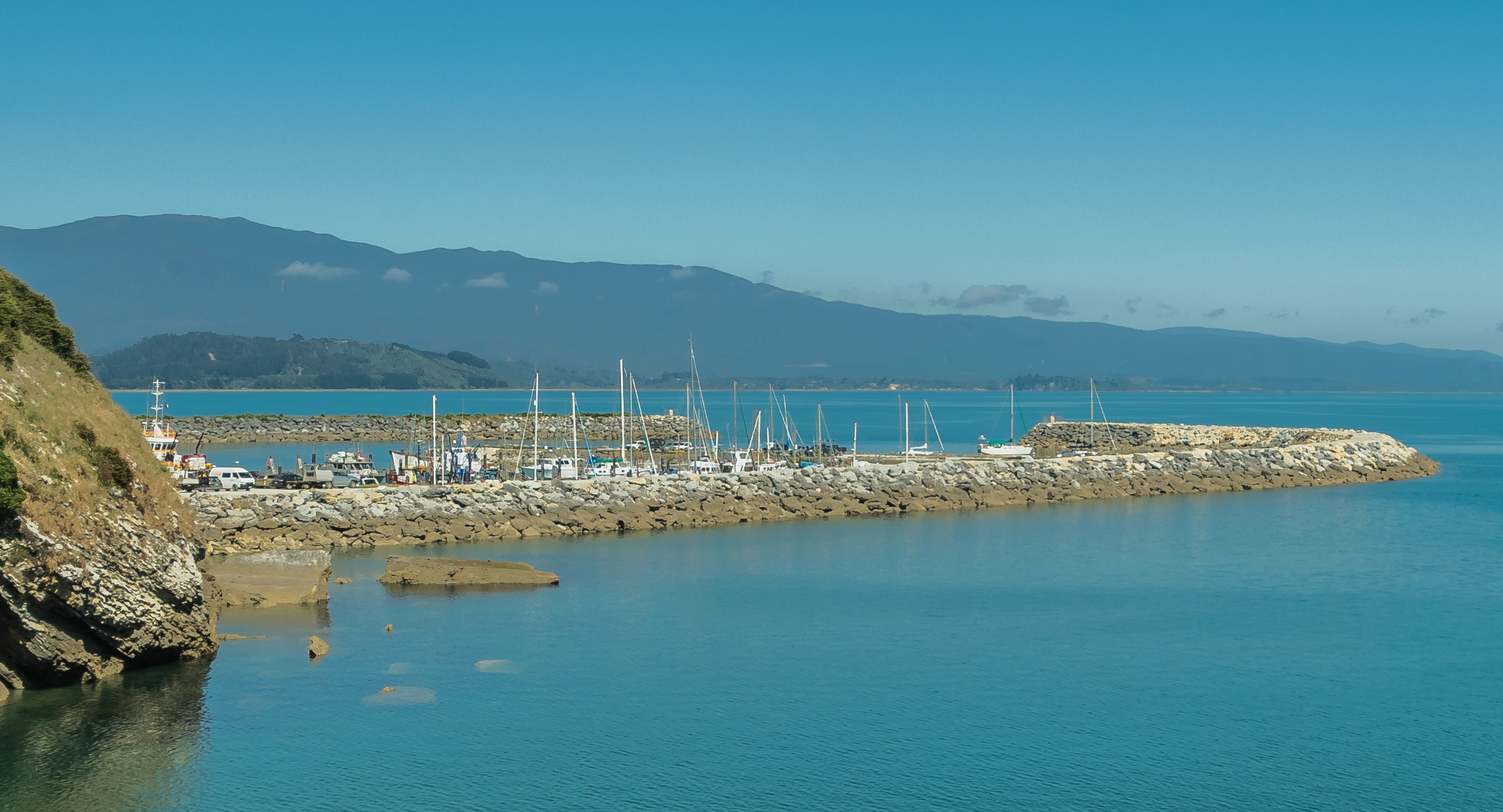
- View of Port Tarakohe
- Interactive map of Tarakohe
- Coordinates: 40°49′52″S 172°53′35″E
- Country: New Zealand
- Territorial authority: Tasman District
- Ward: Golden Bay Ward
- Electorates: West Coast-Tasman; Te Tai Tonga

Government
  - Local authority: Tasman District Council

Area
  - Total: 1.95 km^{2} (0.75 sq mi)

Population (2023 Census)
  - Total: 135
  - Density: 69.2/km^{2} (179/sq mi)
- Time zone: UTC+12 (NZST)
  - Summer (DST): UTC+13 (NZDT)
- Postcode: 7183
- Area code: 03

Tarakohe, in older sources referred to as Terekohe, is a locality in the Tasman District of New Zealand's upper South Island, located east of Pōhara in Golden Bay.

== Demographics ==
Tarakohe locality covers 1.95 km^{2} (0.75 sq mi). It is part of the larger Pōhara-Abel Tasman statistical area.

Historical population
Year	Pop.	±% p.a.
2013	111	—
2018	111	+0.00%
2023	135	+3.99%

Tarakohe had a population of 135 in the 2023 New Zealand census, an increase of 24 people (21.6%) since the 2018 census, and an increase of 24 people (21.6%) since the 2013 census. There were 66 males and 66 females in 57 dwellings. 6.7% of people identified as LGBTIQ+. The median age was 57.6 years (compared with 38.1 years nationally). There were 12 people (8.9%) aged under 15 years, 15 (11.1%) aged 15 to 29, 66 (48.9%) aged 30 to 64, and 42 (31.1%) aged 65 or older.

People could identify as more than one ethnicity. The results were 95.6% European (Pākehā), 8.9% Māori, and 4.4% other, which includes people giving their ethnicity as "New Zealander". English was spoken by 100.0%, Māori by 2.2%, and other languages by 15.6%. No language could be spoken by 2.2% (e.g. too young to talk). New Zealand Sign Language was known by 4.4%. The percentage of people born overseas was 20.0, compared with 28.8% nationally.

Religious affiliations were 17.8% Christian, 2.2% Buddhist, and 2.2% other religions. People who answered that they had no religion were 71.1%, and 8.9% of people did not answer the census question.

Of those at least 15 years old, 36 (29.3%) people had a bachelor's or higher degree, 54 (43.9%) had a post-high school certificate or diploma, and 33 (26.8%) people exclusively held high school qualifications. The median income was $25,600, compared with $41,500 nationally. 3 people (2.4%) earned over $100,000 compared to 12.1% nationally. The employment status of those at least 15 was 42 (34.1%) full-time and 18 (14.6%) part-time.

== Tarakohe cement ==
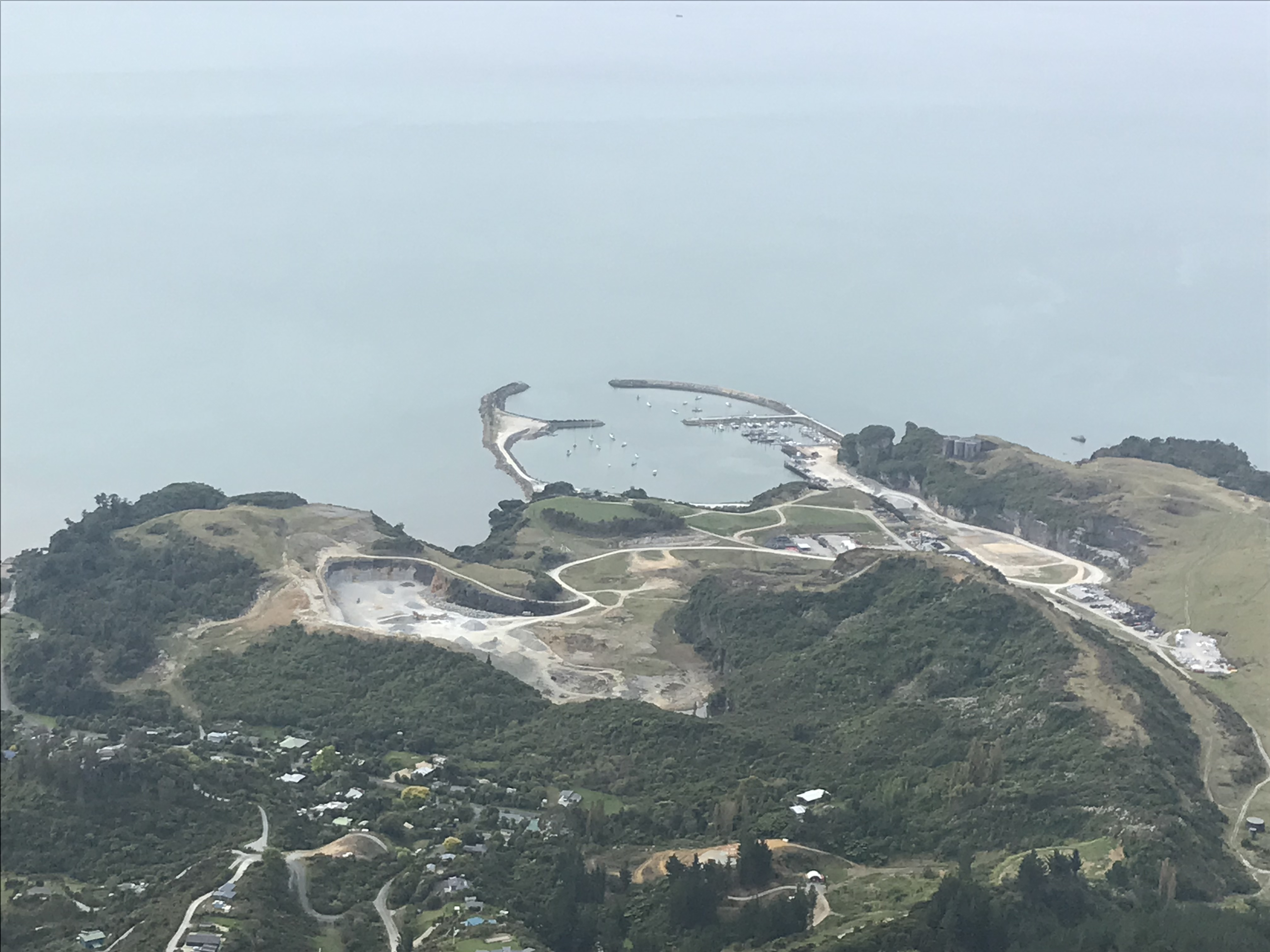
Aerial view of Tarakohe and its limestone quarry

Tarakohe is best known for the manufacture of Portland cement. Geological surveys of Golden Bay showed an area of 24 square kilometres (9.3 sq mi) that held a 30-metre (98 ft) thick layer of limestone suitable for producing cement. In 1908, investors from Nelson and Wellington provided the capital to form the Golden Bay Cement Company. The company built a wharf on the coast in 1910 in what became known as Limestone Bay. A post office opened in Tarakohe in July 1910. Production of cement was commenced in November 1911.

One of the 17 deaths caused by the 1929 Murchison earthquake was at the cement works when a cliff face collapsed onto a powerhouse, killing the engineer Arthur Stubbs inside the building.

Cement from Tarakohe was used in the Manapouri Power Station and many of the Think Big projects, e.g. the Clyde Dam. In 1983, the company merged with Wilson's Portland Cement. It came under the ownership of Fletcher Challenge and the 1988 closure of the facility at Tarakohe had a significant economic and employment impact on Golden Bay. In 2001, Fletcher Challenge sold the cement plant and its land.

=== Port Tarakohe ===
The Golden Bay Cement Company developed Port Tarakohe in several stages; a concrete wharf was added in 1977. Its primary use was for shipping the company's product and it is also used for shipping dolomite quarried at Mount Burnett. Port Tarakohe was sold for NZ$275,000 to Tasman District Council in 1994. Beginning in 2003, work was undertaken at the port: a new wharf was built, the harbour dredged, the breakwater extended, and the harbour entrance narrowed. The improvements were completed by 2005 and the port has since had 61 berths.

After Cyclone Gita destroyed the road over Tākaka Hill on 20 February 2018 and therefore severed all road access to Golden Bay, Port Tarakohe was used to ferry goods and people to and from Nelson Harbour. In July 2019, Tasman District Council applied for a grant from the government's Provincial Growth Fund, with an expected growth of the aquaculture industry (mostly mussel farming) as its main justification. In September 2020, the government responded by offering a $20m loan.

== Abel Tasman Monument ==
The Abel Tasman Monument is a memorial to the first recorded contact between Europeans—led by the Dutch explorer Abel Tasman—and Māori near present-day Tarakohe on 18 and 19 December 1642. It was unveiled 300 years later on the tercentenary of the encounter by the prime minister, several government ministers, and a Dutch delegation. Originally referred to as the Abel Tasman Memorial and designed by the architect Ernst Plischke, the centrepiece of the monument is a concrete monolith painted white and symbolising a Greek funerary stele. Located on a bluff east of Tarakohe Harbour, the land for the monument was gifted by the Golden Bay Cement Company. The dignitaries opened the Abel Tasman National Park the following day and the area holding the monument is part of the national park, although physically separate from it. As was typical for the 1940s, the original inscription focussed on the European experience only and overlooked the Māori perspective.
