= Tata Islands =

Pair of islands off the north coast of the South Island, New Zealand

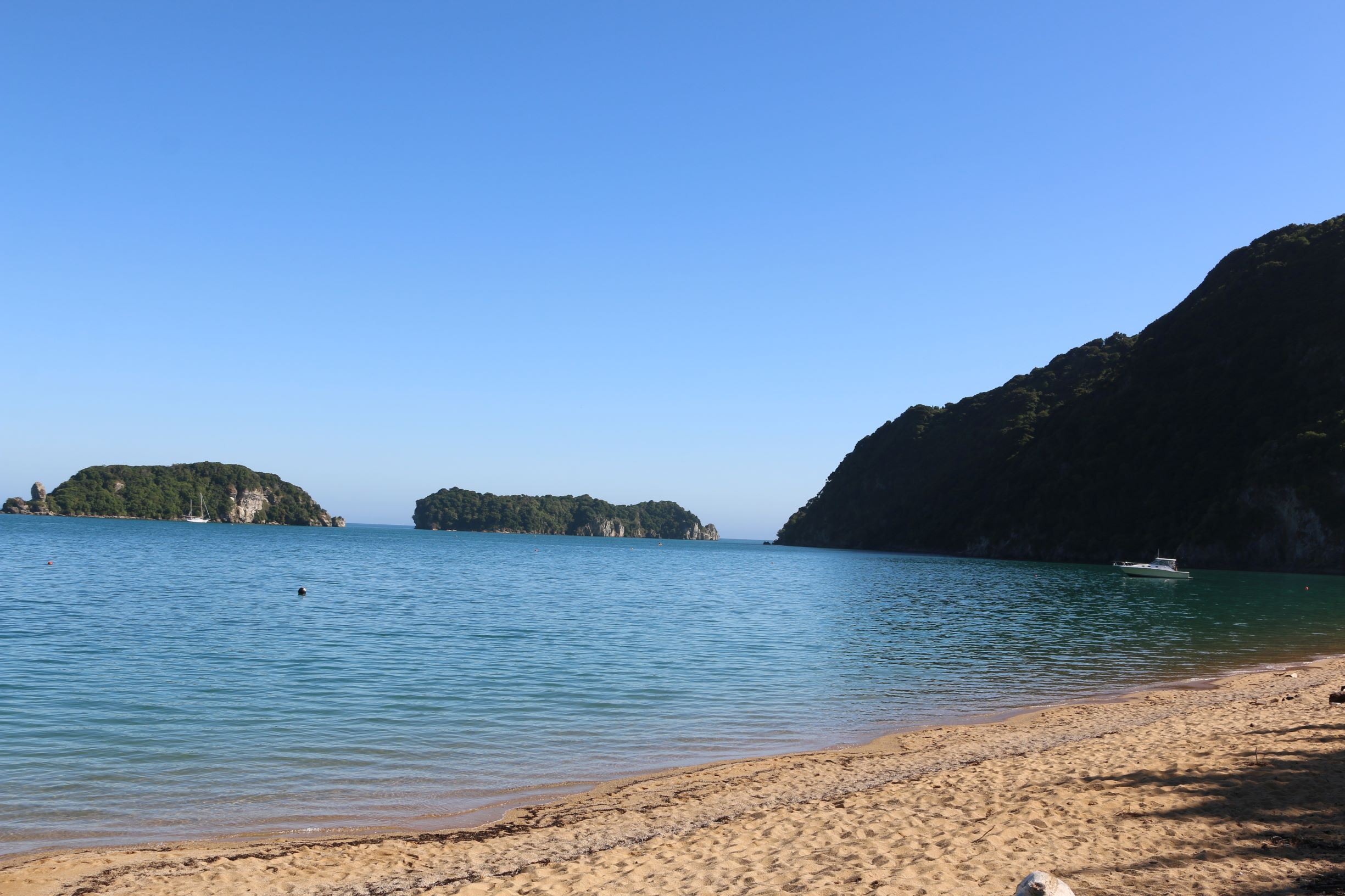
- Tata Islands seen from Tata Beach
- Interactive map of Tata Islands

Geography
- Location: Golden Bay, New Zealand
- Coordinates: 40.802°S 172.911°E
- Adjacent to: Golden Bay
- Total islands: 2
- Major islands: Motu Island; Ngawhiti Island
- Area: 4.6 ha (11 acres)
- Highest elevation: 32 m (105 ft)

Administration
- New Zealand
- District: Tasman

Tata Islands are a pair of small uninhabited islands off the north coast of New Zealand's South Island. They are located some 20 kilometres (12 mi) to the northwest of Tākaka in the southeast of Golden Bay close to Abel Tasman Point, and are contained within Abel Tasman National Park. The small settlement of Tata Beach lies on the South Island mainland one kilometre to the south of the islands.

== Geography ==
The islands are small, with the larger of the two, Motu Island (North Tata) being roughly 300 metres in length and 100 metres in width. It is roughly tabular in form, with much of its area being between 20 and 30 metres in height, rising to some 32 metres (105 ft) at its highest point. The southern island, Ngawhiti Island (South Tata), is roughly 160 by 120 metres in size, and, while less regular than its northern neighbour, rises to a similar altitude. Several small islets and stacks lie off the coast of Ngawhiti Island. The islands' most distinctive geographic feature is a large limestone stack at the southern end of Ngawhiti Island.

== Flora and fauna ==
The waters around the islands are a significant fish nursery, and are also popular with kayakers. The area was proposed as a marine reserve in the 1990s, though this status was not granted. The islands themselves are the site of one of New Zealand's largest populations of spotted shag.

== History ==
There is some evidence of pre-European Māori settlement on Ngawhiti Island, and its native flora may have been burnt back to allow for cultivation. Vegetation on Motu island is more diverse, suggesting that there was no similar burn-off there.

The islands have historically provided deep water shelter for large ships visiting the Golden Bay area, the only site in the bay capable of providing such shelter. From about 1904, parts of Ngawhiti Island were mined for limestone, but in the first decade of the 20th century the government acquired the islands under the Public Works Act.

For many years from the 1930s on, Ngawhiti Island was inhabited by a sole resident, Norwegian Peter Peterson, who was known locally as "The Hermit of South Tata Island". The island and its northern neighbour are now uninhabited.
