= Sams Creek (West Virginia) =

Stream in West Virginia, U.S.

Coordinates: 39°10′52″N 81°32′43″W

Sams Creek is a stream in the U.S. state of West Virginia.

Sams Creek was named after Jonathan Sams, a pioneer who settled there.

== See also ==
- List of rivers of West Virginia
