= Tata Beach =

Settlement in Tasman District, New Zealand

- Settlement
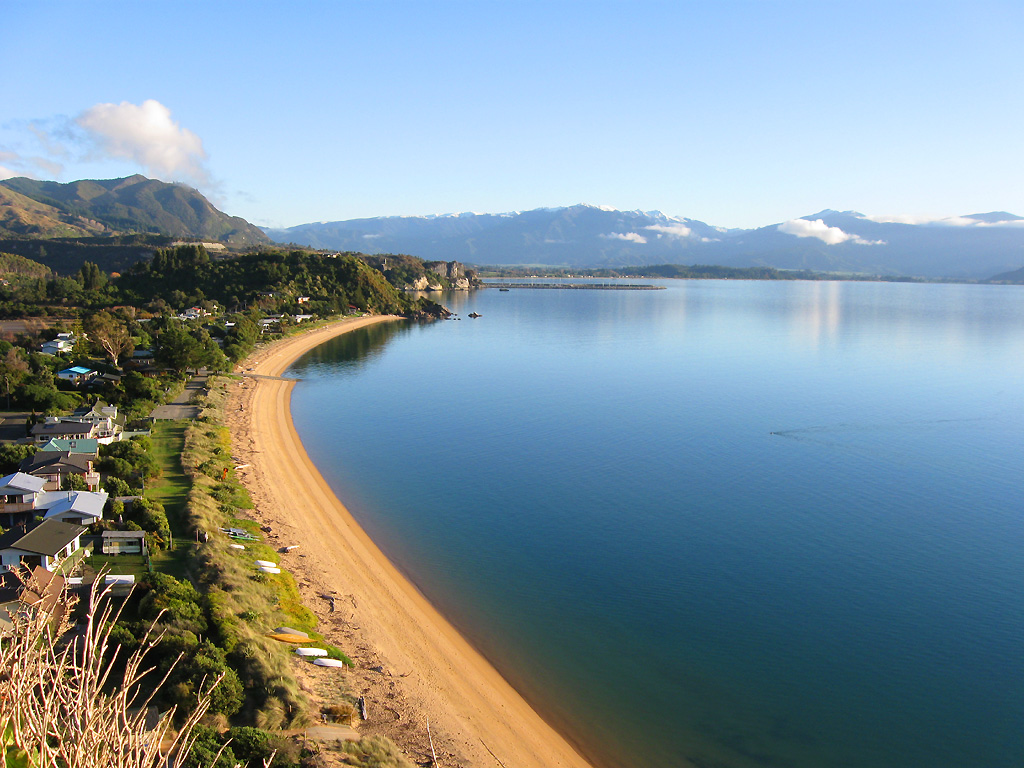
- Tata Beach
- Interactive map of Tata Beach
- Coordinates: 40°48′44″S 172°54′50″E
- Country: New Zealand
- Territorial authority: Tasman
- Ward: Golden Bay Ward
- Community: Golden Bay Community
- Electorates: West Coast-Tasman; Te Tai Tonga (Māori)

Government
  - Territorial Authority: Tasman District Council
  - Mayor of Tasman: Tim King
  - West Coast-Tasman MP: Maureen Pugh
  - Te Tai Tonga MP: Tākuta Ferris

Area
  - Total: 2.24 km^{2} (0.86 sq mi)

Population (June 2025)
  - Total: 150
  - Density: 67/km^{2} (170/sq mi)

Tata Beach is a beach and small coastal settlement of predominantly holiday houses in the South Island, New Zealand. Found in the Golden Bay region, it is approximately 14 kilometres (8.7 mi) north-east of Tākaka.

The uninhabited Tata Islands lie about one kilometre (0.6 mi) north of the beach. Ligar Bay is another settlement 1.5 km south-west by road.

== Demographics ==
Statistics New Zealand describes Ligar Bay and Tata Beach as a rural settlement. It covers 2.24 km^{2} (0.86 sq mi) and had an estimated population of 150 as of June 2025, with a population density of 67 people per km^{2}. It is part of the larger Pōhara-Abel Tasman statistical area.

Historical population for Ligar Bay and Tata Beach
Year	Pop.	±% p.a.
2006	114	—
2013	120	+0.74%
2018	126	+0.98%
2023	138	+1.84%

Ligar Bay and Tata Beach had a population of 138 in the 2023 New Zealand census, an increase of 12 people (9.5%) since the 2018 census, and an increase of 18 people (15.0%) since the 2013 census. There were 69 males and 66 females in 102 dwellings. The median age was 60.9 years (compared with 38.1 years nationally). There were 18 people (13.0%) aged under 15 years, 6 (4.3%) aged 15 to 29, 60 (43.5%) aged 30 to 64, and 54 (39.1%) aged 65 or older.

People could identify as more than one ethnicity. The results were 95.7% European (Pākehā), 4.3% Māori, 2.2% Asian, and 4.3% other, which includes people giving their ethnicity as "New Zealander". English was spoken by 97.8%, and other languages by 13.0%. The percentage of people born overseas was 26.1, compared with 28.8% nationally.

Religious affiliations were 28.3% Christian, 2.2% Buddhist, and 2.2% other religions. People who answered that they had no religion were 63.0%, and 6.5% of people did not answer the census question.

Of those at least 15 years old, 42 (35.0%) people had a bachelor's or higher degree, 54 (45.0%) had a post-high school certificate or diploma, and 24 (20.0%) people exclusively held high school qualifications. The median income was $31,500, compared with $41,500 nationally. 12 people (10.0%) earned over $100,000 compared to 12.1% nationally. The employment status of those at least 15 was 33 (27.5%) full-time and 27 (22.5%) part-time.
