= Pōhara =

Settlement in Tasman District, New Zealand

- Settlement
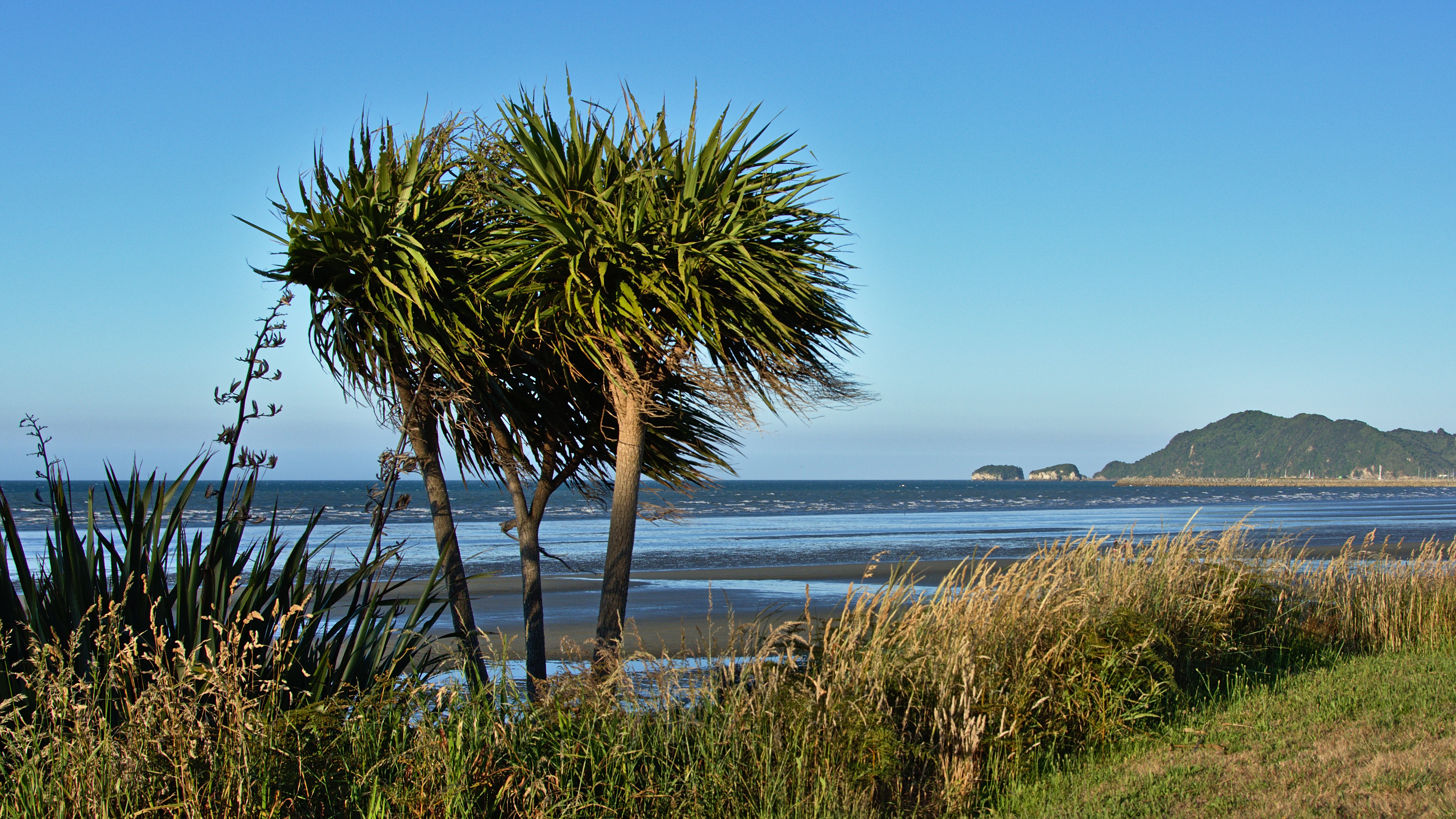
- A cabbage tree on Pōhara Beach
- Interactive map of Pōhara
- Coordinates: 40°50′02″S 172°53′06″E
- Country: New Zealand
- Territorial authority: Tasman
- Ward: Golden Bay Ward
- Community: Golden Bay Community
- Electorates: West Coast-Tasman; Te Tai Tonga (Māori)

Government
  - Territorial authority: Tasman District Council
  - Mayor of Tasman: Tim King
  - West Coast-Tasman MP: Maureen Pugh
  - Te Tai Tonga MP: Tākuta Ferris

Area
  - Total: 5.81 km^{2} (2.24 sq mi)

Population (June 2025)
  - Total: 630
  - Density: 110/km^{2} (280/sq mi)

Pōhara is a rural locality in the Tasman District of New Zealand's South Island. The locality is northeast of Tākaka and southwest of Tata Beach. To the north is Limestone Bay, part of Golden Bay / Mohua

The official spelling was changed from "Pohara" to "Pōhara" by the New Zealand Geographic Board Ngā Pou Taunaha o Aotearoa on 5 November 2018.

In the peak holiday season between Christmas and the end of the year, Pōhara beach has up to 700 visitors a day.

== Demographics ==
=== Pōhara ===
Pōhara is described by Stats NZ as a rural settlement. It covers 5.81 km^{2} (2.24 sq mi) and had an estimated population of 630 as of June 2025, with a population density of 108 people per km^{2}. It is part of the larger Pōhara-Abel Tasman statistical area.

Historical population
Year	Pop.	±% p.a.
2006	504	—
2013	510	+0.17%
2018	510	+0.00%
2023	630	+4.32%
The 2006 population is for a larger area of 8.06 km^{2}. Source:

Pōhara had a population of 630 in the 2023 New Zealand census, an increase of 120 people (23.5%) since the 2018 census, and an increase of 120 people (23.5%) since the 2013 census. There were 300 males, 324 females, and 6 people of other genders in 294 dwellings. 5.2% of people identified as LGBTIQ+. The median age was 57.7 years (compared with 38.1 years nationally). There were 60 people (9.5%) aged under 15 years, 63 (10.0%) aged 15 to 29, 300 (47.6%) aged 30 to 64, and 210 (33.3%) aged 65 or older.

People could identify as more than one ethnicity. The results were 93.3% European (Pākehā); 8.6% Māori; 3.3% Asian; 0.5% Middle Eastern, Latin American and African New Zealanders (MELAA); and 3.8% other, which includes people giving their ethnicity as "New Zealander". English was spoken by 99.0%, Māori by 1.9%, and other languages by 11.9%. No language could be spoken by 1.0% (e.g. too young to talk). New Zealand Sign Language was known by 1.0%. The percentage of people born overseas was 22.9, compared with 28.8% nationally.

Religious affiliations were 22.4% Christian, 0.5% Buddhist, 1.4% New Age, and 1.0% other religions. People who answered that they had no religion were 68.6%, and 6.7% of people did not answer the census question.

Of those at least 15 years old, 153 (26.8%) people had a bachelor's or higher degree, 285 (50.0%) had a post-high school certificate or diploma, and 132 (23.2%) people exclusively held high school qualifications. The median income was $29,900, compared with $41,500 nationally. 36 people (6.3%) earned over $100,000 compared to 12.1% nationally. The employment status of those at least 15 was 207 (36.3%) full-time, 102 (17.9%) part-time, and 9 (1.6%) unemployed.

=== Pōhara-Abel Tasman statistical area ===
Pōhara-Abel Tasman statistical area, which also includes East Tākaka, Motupipi, Tarakohe and Tata Beach, covers 326.13 km^{2} (125.92 sq mi) and had an estimated population of 1,660 as of June 2025, with a population density of 5.1 people per km^{2}.

Historical population for Pōhara-Abel Tasman
Year	Pop.	±% p.a.
2006	1,422	—
2013	1,455	+0.33%
2018	1,470	+0.21%
2023	1,653	+2.37%
The 2006 population is for a smaller area of 326.05 km^{2}. Source:

Pōhara-Abel Tasman had a population of 1,653 in the 2023 New Zealand census, an increase of 183 people (12.4%) since the 2018 census, and an increase of 198 people (13.6%) since the 2013 census. There were 810 males, 831 females, and 12 people of other genders in 786 dwellings. 4.4% of people identified as LGBTIQ+. The median age was 52.7 years (compared with 38.1 years nationally). There were 204 people (12.3%) aged under 15 years, 201 (12.2%) aged 15 to 29, 807 (48.8%) aged 30 to 64, and 441 (26.7%) aged 65 or older.

People could identify as more than one ethnicity. The results were 94.7% European (Pākehā); 8.0% Māori; 0.2% Pasifika; 2.2% Asian; 0.5% Middle Eastern, Latin American and African New Zealanders (MELAA); and 3.4% other, which includes people giving their ethnicity as "New Zealander". English was spoken by 98.7%, Māori by 2.0%, and other languages by 12.7%. No language could be spoken by 1.1% (e.g. too young to talk). New Zealand Sign Language was known by 0.5%. The percentage of people born overseas was 24.3, compared with 28.8% nationally.

Religious affiliations were 19.2% Christian, 0.4% Hindu, 1.1% Buddhist, 1.8% New Age, and 1.6% other religions. People who answered that they had no religion were 69.0%, and 7.3% of people did not answer the census question.

Of those at least 15 years old, 375 (25.9%) people had a bachelor's or higher degree, 744 (51.3%) had a post-high school certificate or diploma, and 330 (22.8%) people exclusively held high school qualifications. The median income was $29,400, compared with $41,500 nationally. 93 people (6.4%) earned over $100,000 compared to 12.1% nationally. The employment status of those at least 15 was 546 (37.7%) full-time, 306 (21.1%) part-time, and 33 (2.3%) unemployed.

== Marae ==
Onetahua Kōkiri Marae is located in Pōhara. It includes Te Ao Marama wharenui (meeting house) and it is a marae (meeting ground) for Ngāti Rārua, Ngāti Tama ki Te Tau Ihu and Te Atiawa o Te Waka-a-Māui.
