= Golden Bay / Mohua =

Bay in the South Island New Zealand

- Massacre Bay, Coal Bay
- Te Tai Tapu (Māori)
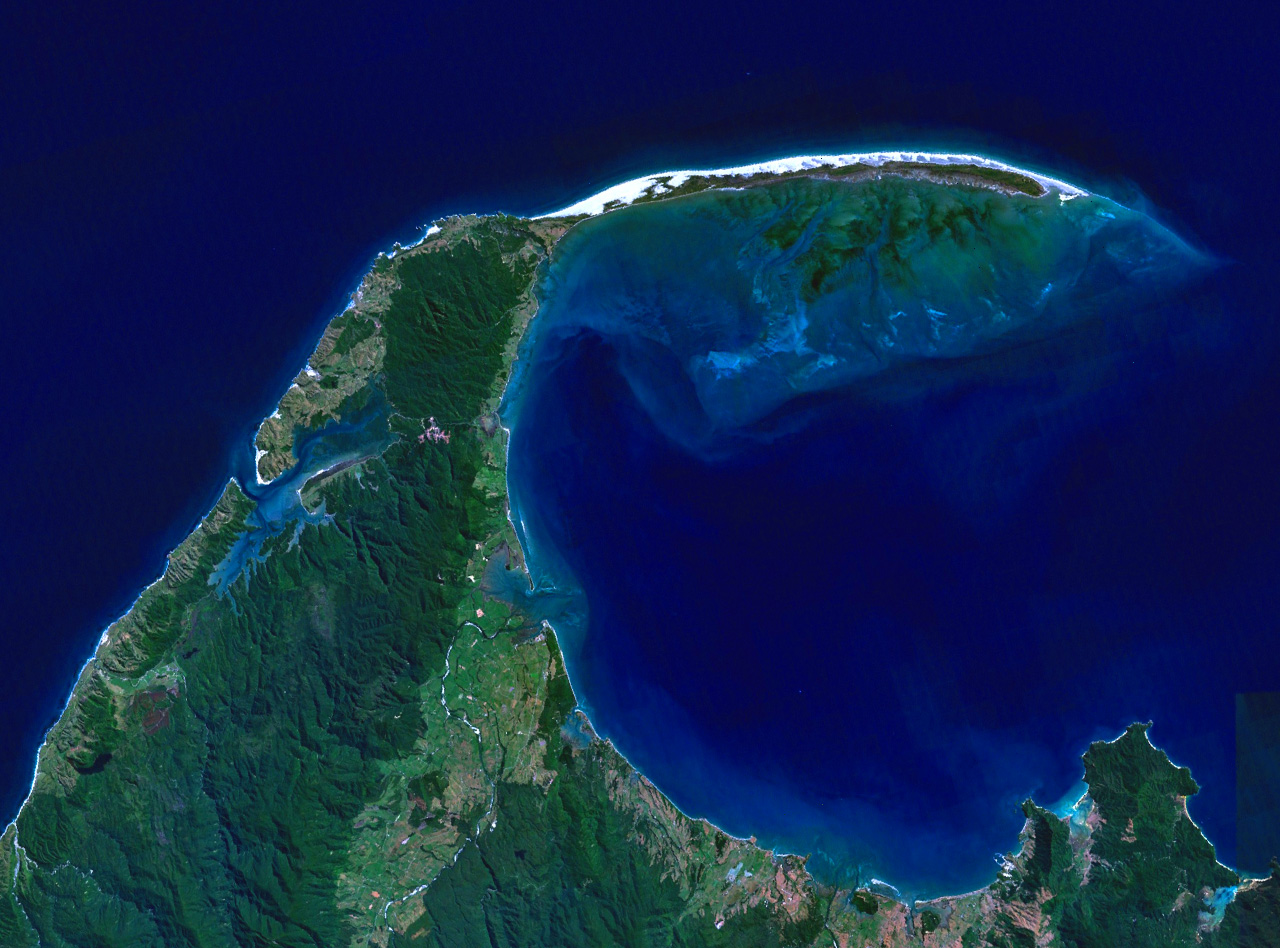
- Landsat image of Golden Bay / Mohua

- Location of Golden Bay / Mohua
- Location: Upper South Island, New Zealand
- Coordinates: 40°40′S 172°50′E
- Type: Bay
- Etymology: Named after the Mohua and for the discovery of gold in the area
- Part of: Tasman Sea
- Primary inflows: Aorere River, Tākaka River, Motupipi River, Wainui River
- Max. length: 28 kilometres (17 mi)
- Max. width: 35 kilometres (22 mi)
- Shore length^{1}: 104 kilometres (65 mi)
- Islands: Tata Islands
- Sections/sub-basins: Ruataniwha Inlet, Parapara Inlet, Wainui Bay
- ^{1} Shore length is not a well-defined measure.

Golden Bay / Mohua is a large shallow bay in New Zealand's Tasman District, near the northern tip of the South Island. An arm of the Tasman Sea, the bay lies northwest of Tasman Bay / Te Tai-o-Aorere and Cook Strait. It is protected in the north by Farewell Spit, a 26-kilometre-long (16 mi) arm of fine golden sand that is the country's longest sandspit. The Aorere and Tākaka rivers are the major waterways to flow into the bay from the south and the west.

The bay was once a resting area for migrating whales and dolphins such as southern right whales and humpback whales, and pygmy blue whales may be observed off the bay as well.

The west and northern regions of the bay are largely unpopulated. Along its southern coast are the towns of Tākaka and Collingwood, and the Abel Tasman National Park. Separation Point / Te Matau, the natural boundary between Golden and Tasman Bays, is in the park. North-eastern parts of Kahurangi National Park are in Golden Bay.

It is known for being a popular tourist destination, because of its good weather and relaxed, friendly lifestyle. Beaches such as Tata Beach are popular locations for retirees and holiday homes (also known as baches).

== Name ==
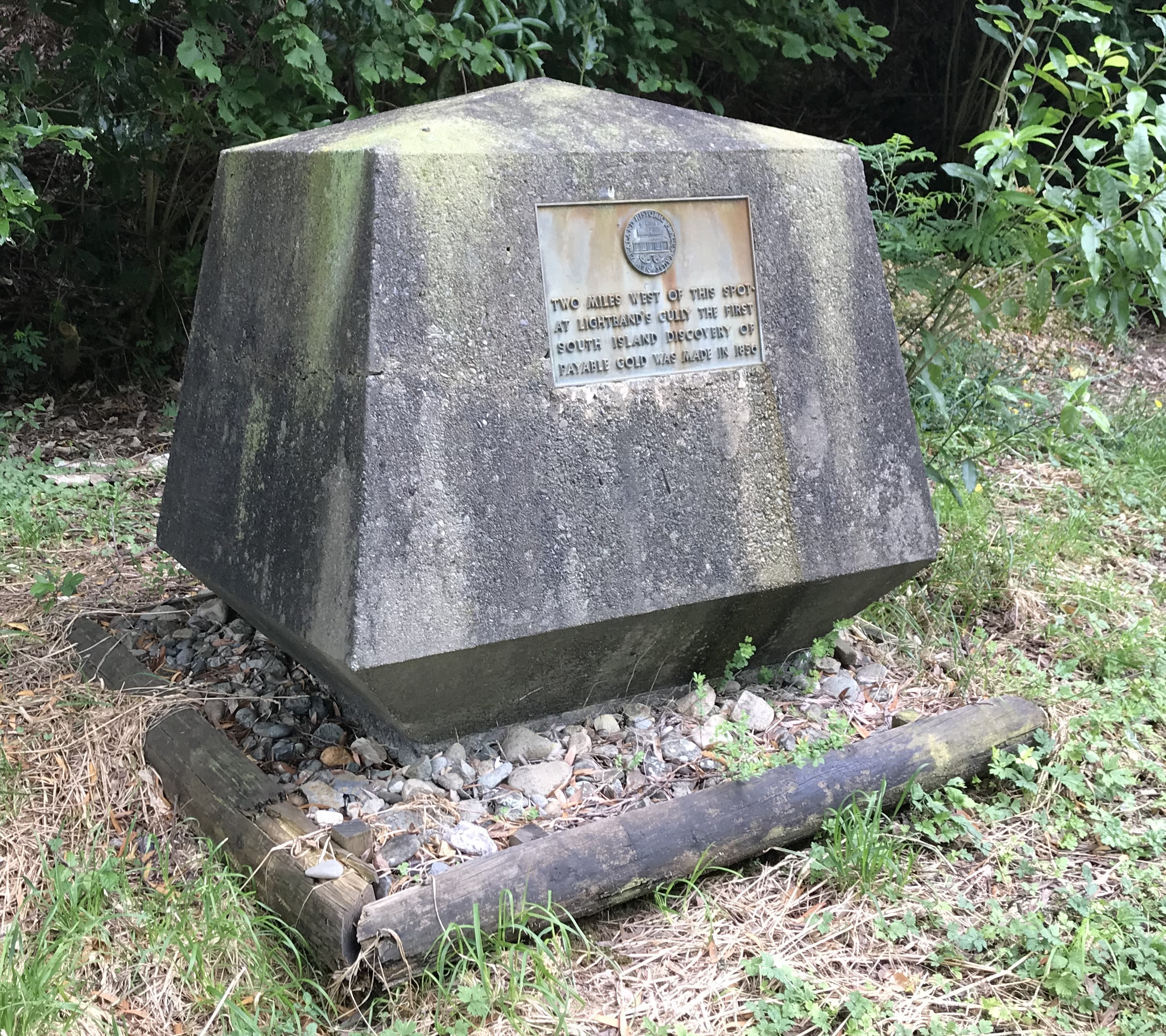
The Lightband Gully memorial in Parapara commemorates the discovery of gold and this event gave the area part of its current name

In Golden Bay / Mohua has been known by several names over the years. Local Māori named the bay and surrounding area Mohua, after the bird of the same name that was once common in the area, but is no longer found nearby. Upon his arrival in 1642, Abel Tasman named the bay Moordenaarsbaai, meaning "Killers' Bay" or "Murderers' Bay", after four of his crew were killed there in a clash with local Māori. In 1770, James Cook included it as part of Tasman Bay, which he called "Blind Bay". Fifty years later, Dumont d'Urville distinguished it from neighbouring Tasman Bay (which continued to be called Blind Bay), giving it the name Massacre Bay.

The bay was renamed again following the discovery of coal in Tākaka in 1842, taking on the name Coal Bay, although Massacre Bay continued to be used. In the late 1850s, the discovery of gold inland from Parapara prompted another change, this time to Golden Bay. Golden Bay increased in usage from this point, and had fully gained prominence over Massacre Bay by the 1920s. In 2014, the bay was officially given the dual name of Golden Bay / Mohua, incorporating the Māori name alongside its previous Pākehā name.

== History ==
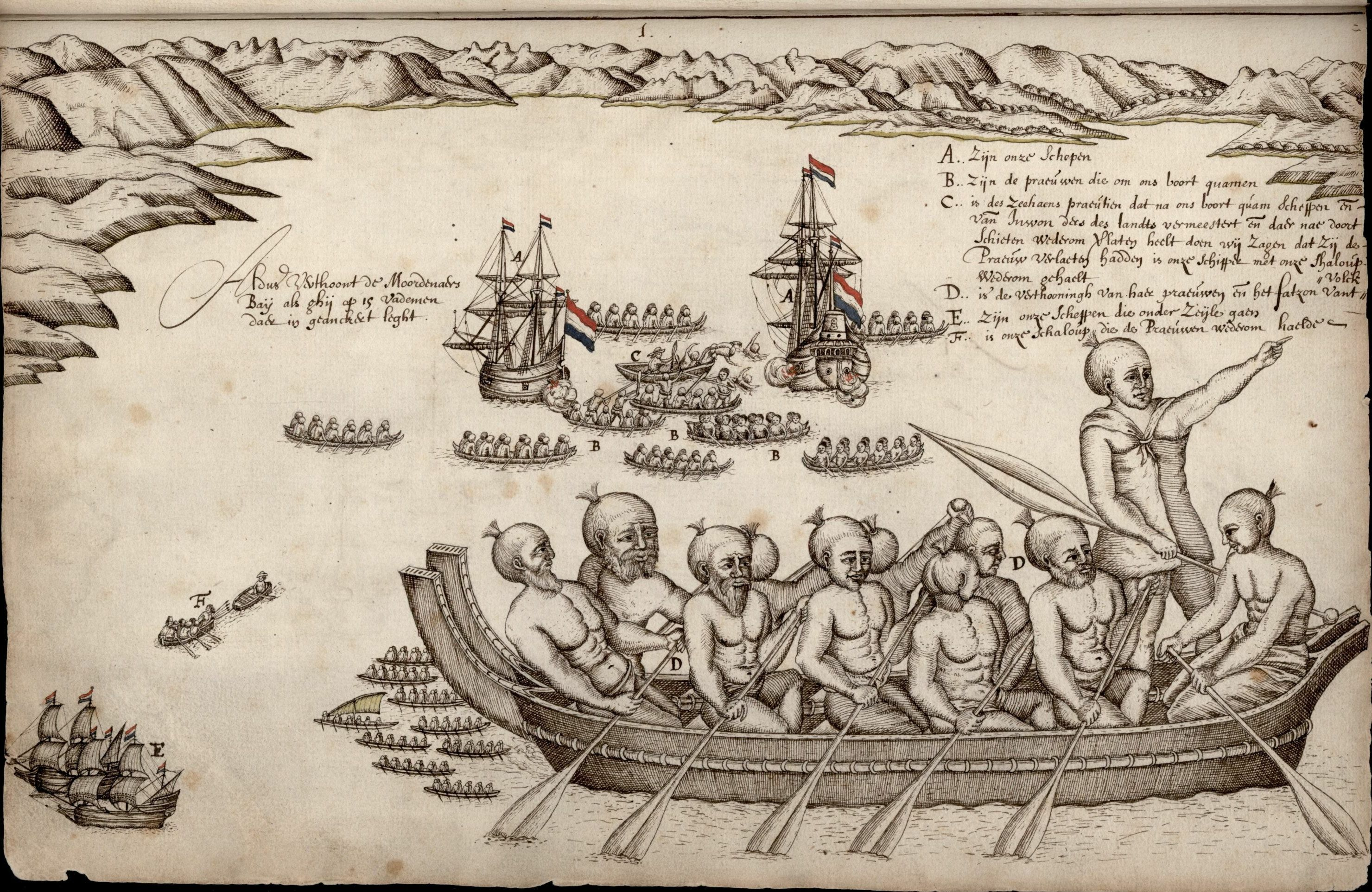
Abel Tasman and a Ngāti Tūmatakōkiri war party in 1642.

Māori lived along the shores of Golden Bay from at least 1450, which is the earliest dated archaeological evidence (from carbon dating) yet found. In 2010 an extensive scientific study was made of Golden Bay by a team from Otago University led by Associate Professor Ian Barber. They accurately plotted and investigated a large number of early Māori sites ranging from pā to kāinga to probable kūmara gardens that stretch along the coastal arc from the base of Farewell Spit at Triangle Flat, 60 km eastwards to a pā site 10 km east of Separation Point. Some of the original inhabitants of the area were Waitaha, Ngāi Tara and Ngāti Wairangi (Hauāuru Māori from Whanganui), who were displaced by Ngāti Tūmatakōkiri in the early 1600s.

Dutch explorer Abel Tasman anchored in this bay in 1642. Ngāti Tūmatakōkiri rammed the Dutch ship's cockboat with a waka and four Dutch seamen were killed by Māori, prompting Tasman to name it Moordenaar's Bay ('Murderers Bay'). Archeological research has shown the Dutch had tried to land at a major agricultural area, which the Māori may have been trying to protect. Tasman saw at least 22 waka. He recorded that one waka carried 17 men, and the 11 waka that chased his ship were "swarming with people". This gives a total of about 200 men, with a likely population of about 500 people. Tasman had already been in the bay overnight when attacked giving the Māori time to assemble an attack force. Archaeological evidence has not shown any large settlements so it is likely that the iwi normally lived in whanau based groups scattered along the coast but mainly in the eastern bay at Ligar Bay, Tata Beach and Wainui Bay where there are 20 known archaeological sites in a 10 km zone.

In 1770, during his first voyage, English explorer James Cook included the bay as part of Blind Bay, but upon his second voyage to the bay in 1773 realised that it was in fact the location of Murderers Bay. The French explorer Jules Dumont d'Urville appears to have changed the name to Massacre Bay.

After Ngāti Tūmatakōkiri's defeat in the 1810s, Golden Bay became a part of the rohe of Ngāti Apa ki te Rā Tō.

=== Pākehā settlement ===
European settlement commenced in October 1842 with the Lovell family settling at Motupipi near the then existing Māori pā site. Earlier, in March of that year, Frederick Tuckett had discovered coal on the beach near the Motupipi pā. There was a report from May 1841, which also stated there was coal in the area. In the 1840s, following the discoveries, the local population unsuccessfully sought to have it renamed Coal Bay.

In 1846, Charles Heaphy and Thomas Brunner with their Māori guide Kehu, passed through Golden Bay on their journey to the West Coast. In 1850, Packard, Robinson and Lovell started the first sawmill in Tākaka and between 1852 and 1856 land was sold to various European immigrants in Golden Bay by some members of the local iwi but without the consent of the entire iwi. In 1855 William Gibbs bought 50 acres (20 ha) of land from local Māori and established the town of Gibbstown which later was renamed Collingwood.

In the late 1850s, with the discovery of gold at Aorere, its name was changed to Golden Bay. In the Great Depression, miners returned to search for any remaining gold in a government-subsidised prospecting scheme for the unemployed, and about 40 miners lived in a dozen huts around Waingaro Forks.

The road over Tākaka Hill was completed in 1888. Prior to this, the usual method of access to Golden Bay was by sea.

A coal mining lease was granted to Joseph Taylor and James Walker in 1895 to a piece of land at Pūponga on the coast between Farewell Spit and Collingwood. They subsequently discovered a seam of coal that was between three and seven feet in depth. Work on developing a mine progressed with a tramline built and a wharf built, and dredging took place to allow ships to berth and be loaded with coal. By 1910, 73 men were employed at the mine and over 30,000 tons of coal had been mined. The mine was run by various companies until 1974 when it became uneconomic.

Deposits of limonite and coal lead to the development of an iron works at Onekaka. The Onekaka Ironworks started operating in 1924. A hydroelectric scheme was built to power the ironworks and a wharf and tramway were built to move supplies and product in and out of the factory. The ironworks fell victim to the great depression, a saturated local market for iron and Australian tariffs limiting the export potential. The iron works closed in 1935. The iron works were nationalised but the grand plans to revitalise the iron works never succeeded and it was finally closed for good in 1954.

=== Conservation efforts ===
The Abel Tasman National Park was established on 16 December 1942 which was 300 years exactly after Abel Tasman had visited Golden Bay. It was established thanks to the determined efforts of Pérrine Moncrieff, who was concerned about both a proposal to mill the trees around Totaranui in 1937 and a plan to build a road through the area. Home to beech forests, red tussock, penguin colonies, wading birds and seals, the park has rich ecological systems.

During the 1960s and the early 1970s, the Ministry of Works surveyed the land where the Heaphy Track now exists for a proposed road to link Golden Bay with the Karamea. This was encouraged by local authorities both in Golden Bay and on the West Coast. The project never progressed beyond this due to public opposition and a lack of funding from the government.

The Northwest Nelson Forest Park was created in 1970 by amalgamating eight state forest parks. The Tasman Wilderness area was established in 1988 and this entire area was given the highest level of conservation protection in 1996 when it became the Kahurangi National Park. It is the second largest of New Zealand's national park and forms the majority of Golden Bay's interior. The primary reason for its establishment was a new emphasis on protecting the rich biodiversity of the park. It has the largest number of endemic plants of any national park. The park includes the great spotted kiwi, wētā, 29 species of carnivorous snails and native cave spiders.

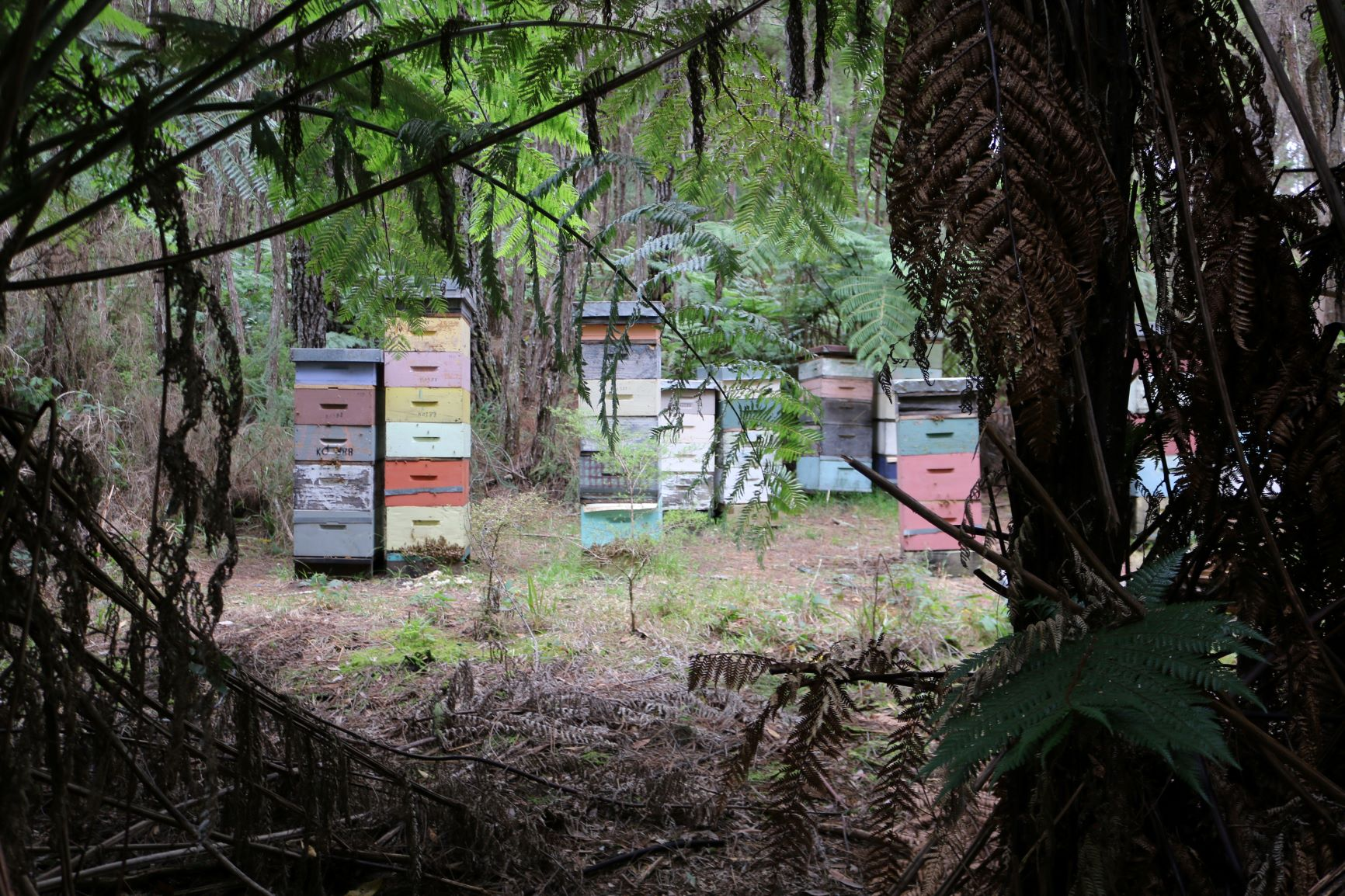
Beehives at Milnthorpe Park (2020)

In 1974, the Milnethorpe Park regeneration project was started. Four hundred acres (160 ha) of land overlooking the beach which had very poor soils was chosen for the project. Native species would not grow on the land initially. A variety of Australian gum trees and acacias were planted. As they grew and the soil conditions improved, natives were established amongst them. By 2020, the park had a forest like appearance with many kilometres of walking tracks built.

=== Recent history ===
On 14 December 2011, the region, along with much of the Nelson and Tasman regions, were hit by heavy rain and flooding. It was described as a 1-in-500-year downpour for Tākaka. This affected many homes around the Pōhara, Ligar Bay, Tata Beach and Wainui area. State Highway 60 between Tākaka and Collingwood was severely damaged at Bird's Hill. The road to Totaranui, a popular isolated tourist destination in Tasman Bay, was badly damaged and was reopened on 29 June 2012.

Ex Cyclone Gita hit Golden Bay in February 2018 and damaged state highway 60 over the Tākaka Hill isolating Golden Bay from the rest of the South Island. The road over Tākaka Hill was closed by 16 landslides. Tākaka lost electricity and roads and bridges were damaged making them unusable. Barges were required to bring in food supplies and keep the Fonterra dairy factory in operation in Tākaka. It took a number of days for the NZ Transport Agency to reopen the road over Tākaka Hill to essential vehicles and those most urgently needing to leave the region. The road has taken substantial work and time to repair and was fully repaired by the end of 2021.

== Demographics ==
Golden Bay/Mohua, which includes Bainham, Collingwood, Parapara, Pōhara, Pūponga, Tākaka and Tata Beach, covers 2,587.54 km^{2} (999.05 sq mi) It had an estimated population of 5,810 as of June 2025, with a population density of 2.2 people per km^{2}.

Historical population
Year	Pop.	±% p.a.
2006	4,830	—
2013	5,001	+0.50%
2018	5,226	+0.88%
2023	5,745	+1.91%

Golden Bay had a population of 5,745 in the 2023 New Zealand census, an increase of 519 people (9.9%) since the 2018 census, and an increase of 744 people (14.9%) since the 2013 census. There were 2,847 males, 2,865 females, and 36 people of other genders in 2,577 dwellings. 4.0% of people identified as LGBTIQ+. The median age was 50.2 years (compared with 38.1 years nationally). There were 876 people (15.2%) aged under 15 years, 669 (11.6%) aged 15 to 29, 2,715 (47.3%) aged 30 to 64, and 1,488 (25.9%) aged 65 or older.

People could identify as more than one ethnicity. The results were 93.7% European (Pākehā); 9.0% Māori; 0.9% Pasifika; 2.6% Asian; 0.9% Middle Eastern, Latin American and African New Zealanders (MELAA); and 3.8% other, which includes people giving their ethnicity as "New Zealander". English was spoken by 98.2%, Māori by 2.4%, Samoan by 0.1%, and other languages by 11.4%. No language could be spoken by 1.4% (e.g. too young to talk). New Zealand Sign Language was known by 0.5%. The percentage of people born overseas was 23.3, compared with 28.8% nationally.

Religious affiliations were 19.0% Christian, 0.2% Hindu, 0.1% Islam, 0.2% Māori religious beliefs, 1.0% Buddhist, 1.6% New Age, 0.1% Jewish, and 1.6% other religions. People who answered that they had no religion were 68.9%, and 7.8% of people did not answer the census question.

Of those at least 15 years old, 1,176 (24.2%) people had a bachelor's or higher degree, 2,610 (53.6%) had a post-high school certificate or diploma, and 1,083 (22.2%) people exclusively held high school qualifications. The median income was $29,100, compared with $41,500 nationally. 258 people (5.3%) earned over $100,000 compared to 12.1% nationally. The employment status of those at least 15 was 1,872 (38.4%) full-time, 1,047 (21.5%) part-time, and 84 (1.7%) unemployed.

Individual statistical areas
Name	Area (km^{2})	Population	Density (per km^{2})	Dwellings	Median age	Median income
Golden Bay/Mohua	2,248.90	2,703	1.20	1,215	50.2 years	$28,400
Tākaka	12.52	1,392	111.18	576	47.1 years	$30,400
Pōhara-Abel Tasman	326.13	1,653	5.07	786	52.7 years	$29,400
New Zealand					38.1 years	$41,500

Over the summer months, the population of Golden Bay increases significantly with holiday makers taking holidays near the Golden Bay beaches. Numbers of people staying in Golden Bay have been reported as swelling the population up to 25.000 people during the peak holiday season.

== Industry ==
Traditionally, extracting minerals and resources was dominant in Golden Bay. Today, the online retailer HealthPost based in Collingwood is the area's largest employer.

=== Hydroelectricity ===
The Cobb Valley is the location of the Cobb Hydroelectric Power Station, built between 1936 and 1956. The reservoir sits at 794 metres (2,605 ft) above sea level at the confluence of the Tākaka and Cobb rivers. The power station is situated 600 vertical metres below and provides 32 megawatts of power. The average annual output is 192 GWh.

The power station's construction was difficult due to the local weather with an annual rainfall of over 2,200 mm (87 inches) and snow and heavy frosts in winter. The dam was originally planned to be concrete but this was deemed to be not suitable and an earth dam was constructed instead. It first produced power in 1944.

=== Asbestos mining ===
Asbestos was discovered in Golden Bay in 1882 in the mountains behind Tākaka. Several attempts were made to obtain commercial quantities in 1896 and 1908 but miners struggled with the isolated mountainous location. In 1917, 100 tons of asbestos was brought down by packhorse. With the development of the Cobb Valley hydroelectricity scheme, and in particular, the access road, asbestos mining became viable. Forty tons were extracted each month until the mine closed in 1945. The mine reopened in 1949 with government assistance and mining continued until 1964.

=== Golden Bay Cement ===
The components of Portland cement were found to be all available in Golden Bay and in the early 1880s a cement works was built near Collingwood but was never completed due to a lack of financing. In 1909 a cement works plant was built at Tarakohe where there was plenty of suitable limestone to quarry close to a safe anchorage. The end product was then shipped to the North Island where plenty of demand existed. A wharf was built in 1910 and then a few years later a road was built from the cement works round the bays to Pōhara. By 1928, 50,000 tons of cement was produced annually. To provide bulk shipment of cement by sea, the ship MV Golden Bay was acquired in 1955.

In 1988, the new owners, Fletcher Challenge, closed the cement works and transferred the name Golden Bay Cement to their other plant in Whangārei. In 1994, the harbour facilities owned by the cement works were sold to the Tasman District Council.

=== Dairy farming ===
In 2009, there were 83 dairy farms which supplied the Fonterra factory in Tākaka. The factory turned about 525,000 litres of milk each day into skim milk powder.

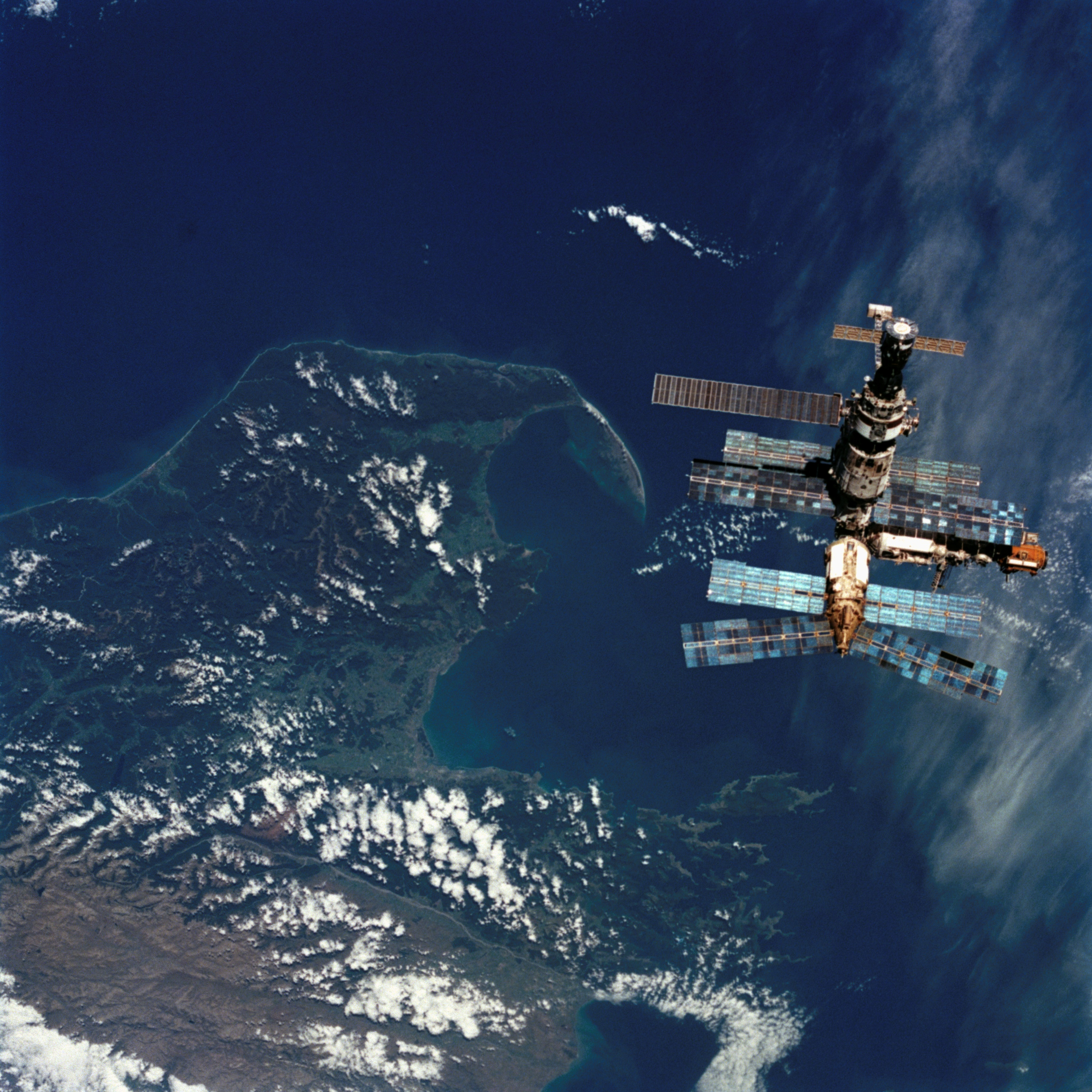
Mir Space Station with a Golden Bay / Mohua as a background

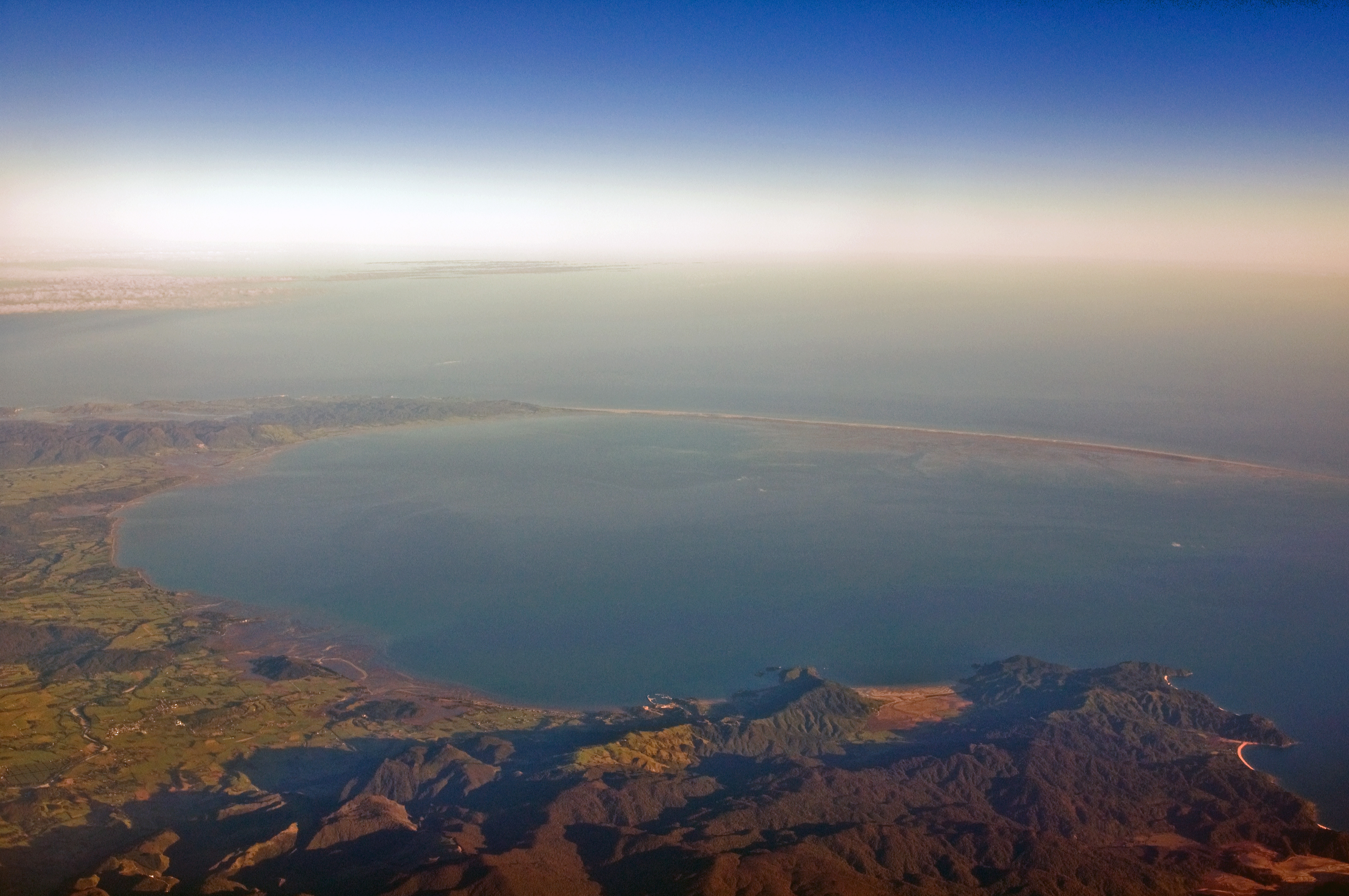
Golden Bay and Farewell Spit from the air

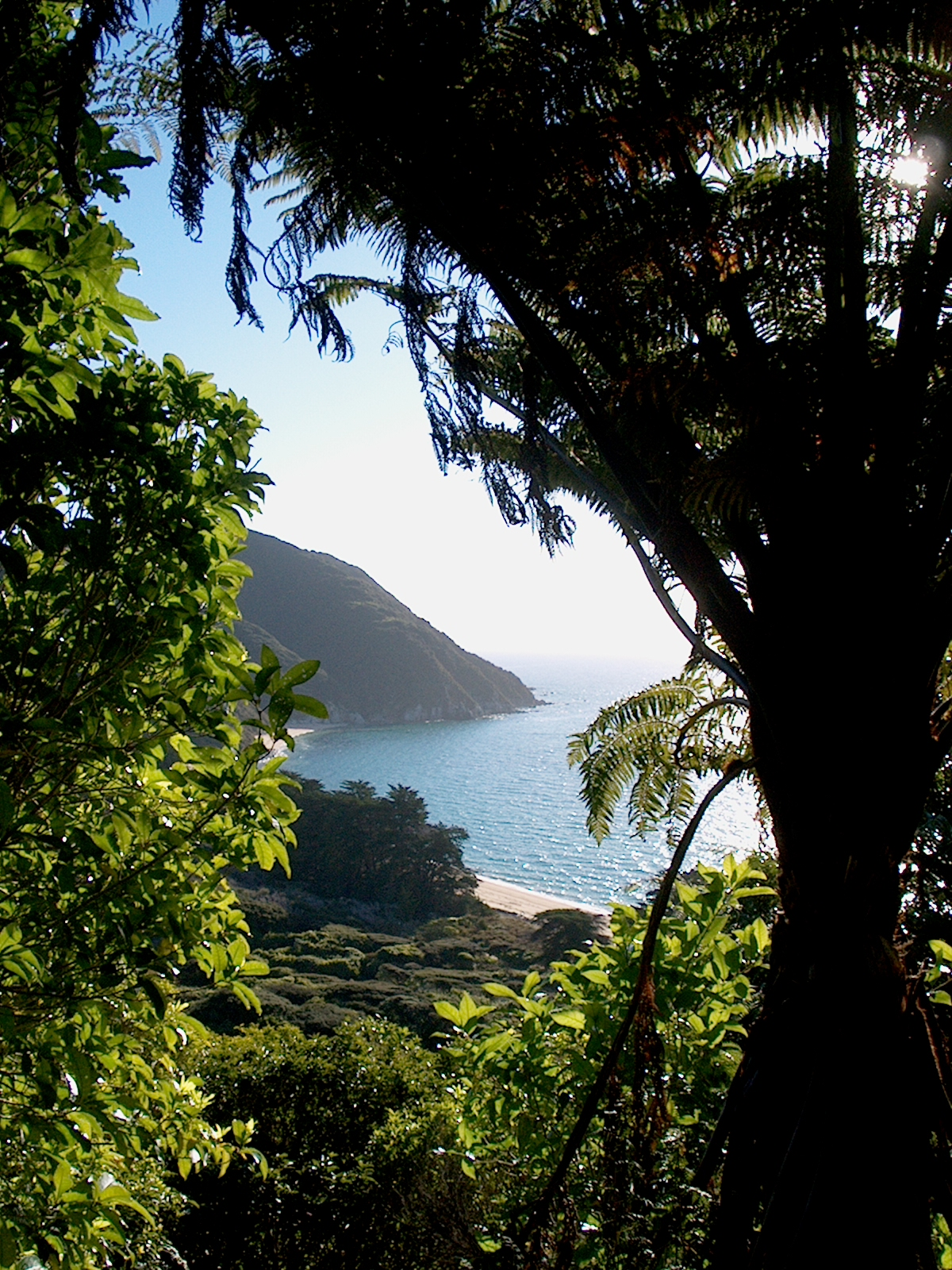
One of many beaches in Abel Tasman National Park
