= Appos Creek =

Creek in New Zealand; site of first payable gold discovery in South Island

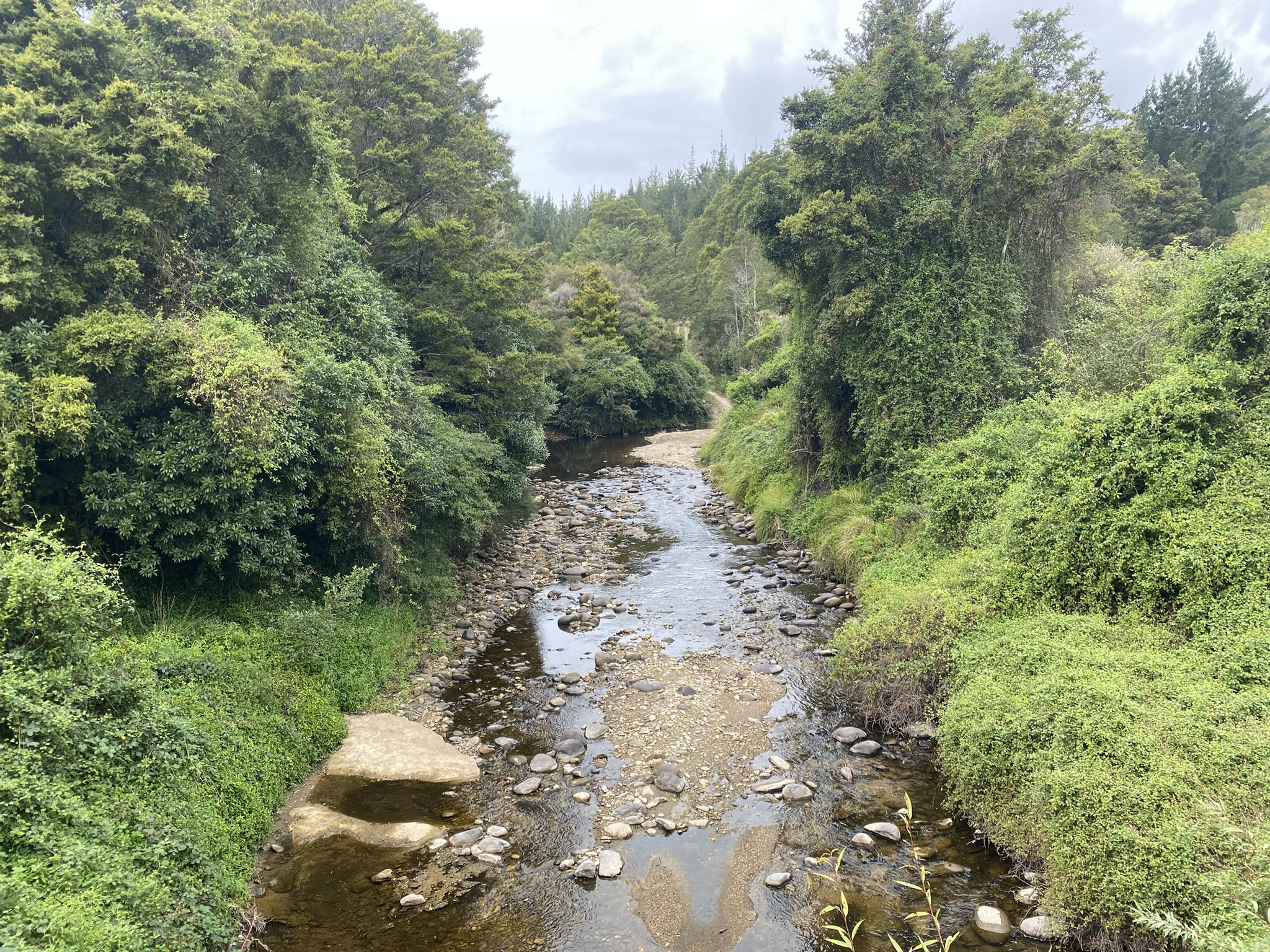
- Appos Creek as seen from Devil's Boots Road
- Route of Appos Creek

Location
- Country: New Zealand

Physical characteristics
- Source
  - location: Appos Flat
  - coordinates: 40°43′41″S 172°39′51″E
  - elevation: 120 m
- Mouth
  - location: Aorere River
  - coordinates: 40°44′15″S 172°37′54″E
  - elevation: 19 m

Basin features
- Progression: Appos Creek → Aorere River → Golden Bay / Mohua → Tasman Sea
- Bridges: Devil's Boots Road

Appos Creek is a small waterway in the hills behind the Golden Bay / Mohua township of Parapara in New Zealand. The creek is notable as the site of the first gold discovery—in 1856—in the South Island, and this started the Golden Bay gold rush. This gold rush, which lasted for three years, triggered a name change of the area, from Massacre Bay to Golden Bay.

== Location ==
Appos Creek is a waterway in the hills behind Parapara. The creek begins at Appos Flat. Appos Creek discharges into the Aorere River.

There is legal access—mostly via paper roads—from Plain Road: a corridor accesses Appos Flat, then descends along Appos Creek to its confluence with the creek coming out of Lightband Gully, with the paper road then following up the gully and beyond it along an unnamed tributary.

== Naming ==
According to Place Names of New Zealand, the creek was named after Appo Hocton from Nelson, but Hocton's entry published in the Dictionary of New Zealand Biography is silent on him having ever been involved in gold mining. Local writer Enga Washbourn published a family history in 1970 titled Courage and Camp Ovens, with her great-grandfather William Washbourn intimately involved in the resulting gold rush. In the book, she talks of Appoo's Creek and Appoo's Flat being named after a "Cingalese (Note: Cingalese is an archaic spelling of Sinhalese, i.e. a person from Sri Lanka; Hocton, on the other hand, was Chinese.) digger whose name appears on a passenger list in February 1857". The passenger list she refers to was published in The Nelson Examiner and New Zealand Chronicle on 25 February 1857, reporting that Appoo was returning from Massacre Bay. (Note: Massacre Bay was an early name of the area; it was renamed to Golden Bay as a consequence of the gold rush.) Jacobus Appoo was a hairdresser in Nelson. Nelson geologist and historian Mike Johnston, in his scholarly work on the gold rush titled Aorere Gold, concurs with Washbourn that Jacobus Appoo is the person after whom the creek and flat are named.

== History ==
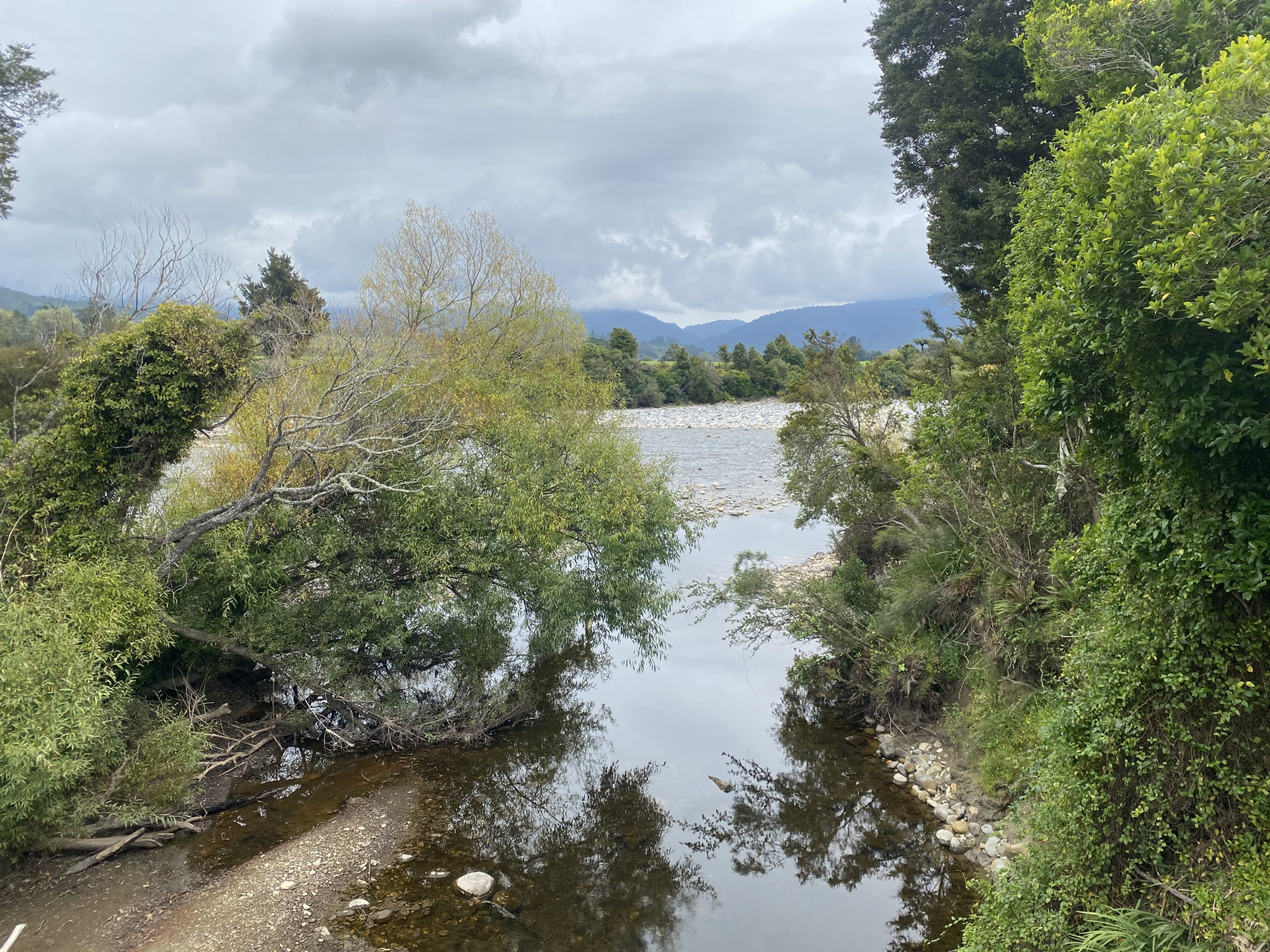
Appos Creek where it flows into the Aorere River

John Ellis and John James found gold in 1856 at the point where Lightband Gully's creek flows into Appos Creek. William Lightband was told about the find by Ellis and James. From 1851 to 1853, Lightband Jr. had been on Australian gold fields. Lightband Jr. and William Hough did some further prospecting at the original claim, and after a week they moved further up Lightband Gully. By February 1857, they found a location that gave good returns.

The wider area proved to hold gold, and over the following three years, some 2000 miners came to the Aorere gold field. Finding gold triggered the change of the area's name: in 1642, Abel Tasman had called the area Murderers ("Moordenaers") Bay, which later became Massacre Bay, but this became Golden Bay in the 1850s.
