= Ferntown Bridge =

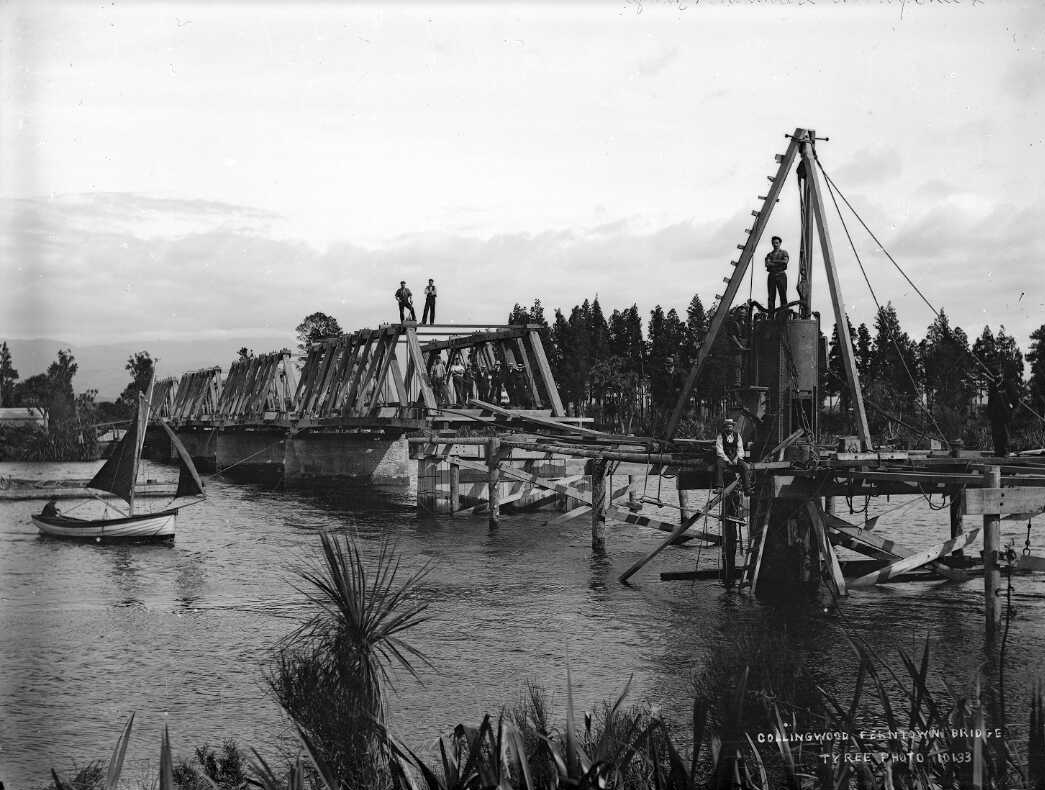
- Ferntown Bridge under construction in 1902 or 1903
- Coordinates: 40.67501°S 172.6612°E
- Carries: road traffic
- Crosses: Aorere River
- Locale: Golden Bay / Mohua
- Named for: the locality to the north of the bridge
- Owner: Tasman District Council

Characteristics
- No. of lanes: One

History
- Designer: Public Works Department
- Construction start: 1902
- Construction end: 1903
- Inaugurated: 1905

Location
- Interactive map of Ferntown Bridge

The Ferntown Bridge spans the Aorere River just upstream from Collingwood in New Zealand. The Aorere River is a major river in Golden Bay / Mohua, and the Ferntown Bridge was opened in 1905, significantly improving the ability for locals to travel within the district.

== Etymology ==
The Ferntown Bridge connects Collingwood with the locality Ferntown on the north side of the Aorere River. Ferntown was named by early European settlers after Ferntown in Scotland.

== History ==
Locals petitioned for a bridge to be built crossing the Aorere River near Collingwood. The bridge was for the benefits of settlers in "West Wanganui, Pākawau [and areas further north], Ferntown and Kaituna districts". J. Shaw of Pākawau had initiated the petition. At the time, travel was along the beach, fording various creeks and inlets, with three hours at most per tide available at the inlets. There was also a rough river ford some distance upstream from Collingwood, and a bridge some 5 mi (8.0 km) upriver, too far out of the way to be useful for the communities that petitioned. Thomas Roberts, a chartered engineer from Nelson working for the Public Works Department, was commissioned in July 1899 to produce a feasibility study. The study was published in the Golden Bay Argus in March 1900.

In July 1900, the chairman of the Collingwood County Council (Andrew Sinclair) and councillor Alfred Peart were sent to Wellington as a deputation to lobby government on behalf of the district's residents for a bridge grant. In Wellington, the deputation negotiated with government ministers. Roderick McKenzie, who represented the Motueka electorate, (Note: From 1896 to 1946, the Motueka electorate covered all of Mohua / Golden Bay.) was supportive of the deputation's aim. At that time, the government through the Minister of Lands (Thomas Young Duncan) had just approved a pound-for-pound grant for protective work at the bridge in Tākaka over the Tākaka River.

The deputation was successful, and a bridge design had been completed by the Public Works Department by September 1901. Tenders were invited in March 1902. The contract was won by Fraser and Co of Dunedin, with the iron work supplied by A. & T. Burt of the same town. The government agreed to also take care of the approaches to the bridge, and this work was tendered for in December 1903. At that time, the bridge itself had been completed, but it was not usable as several small bridges on the river flats north of the Ferntown Bridge had to be built as well. It was not until 1905 that this additional work was completed, and the Ferntown Bridge officially opened.

== Bridge structure ==
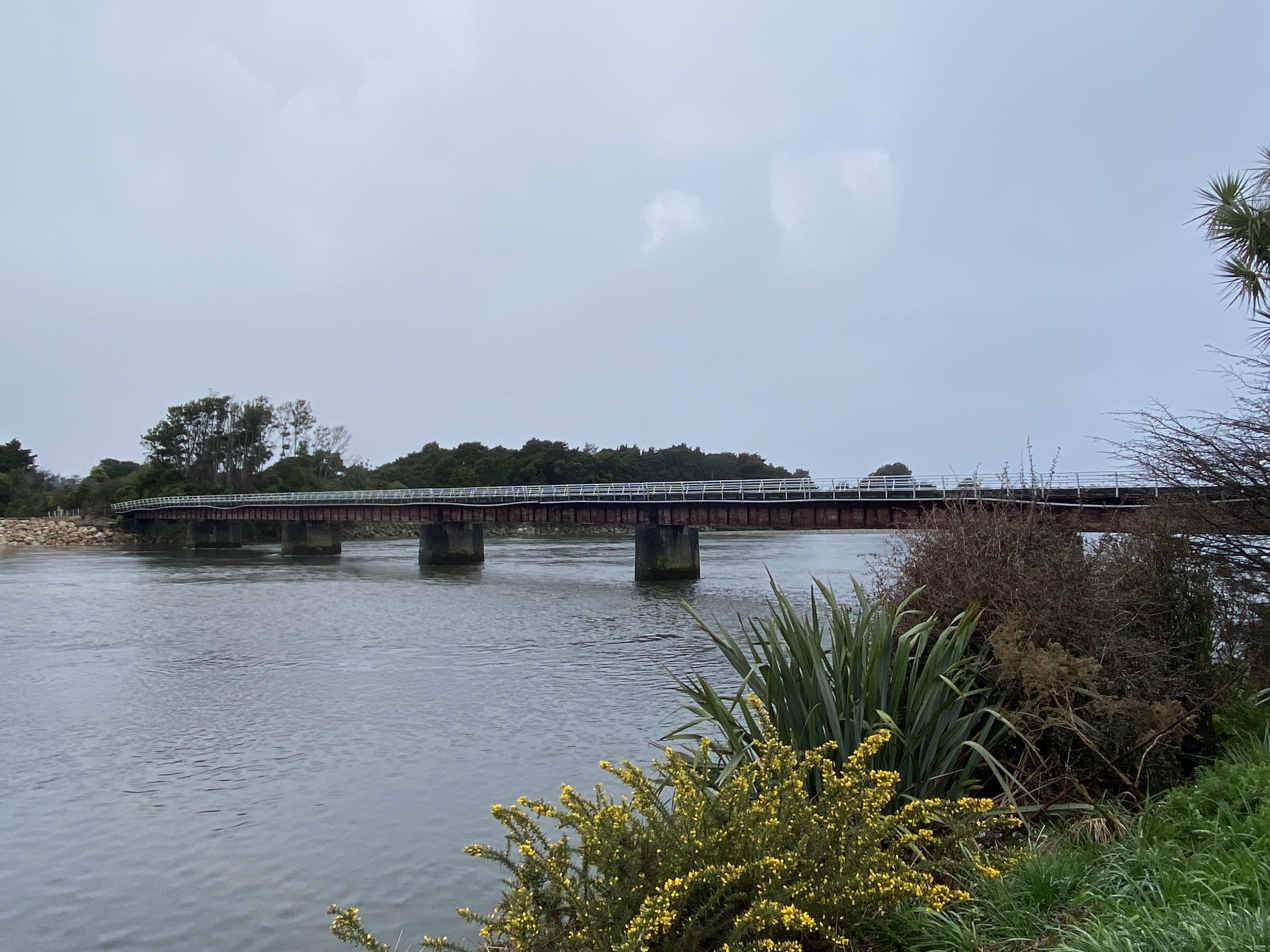
Ferntown Bridge in 2025, looking downstream

Iron cylinders were driven into the river by October 1902. These cylinders were filled with concrete and thus formed the foundations for the concrete piers. Six timber trusses of 24.4 m (80 ft) length created the superstructure.

In 1962, the timber trusses were replaced with plate girders. The construction method was to place the plate girders above their resting place, then explode the timber trusses and drop them into the river below, before lowering the plate girders onto the piers. Concrete slabs, each weighing 2.25 t (2.21 long tons; 2.48 short tons), formed the decking.
