= Parapara, Tasman =

Locality in Tasman District, New Zealand

Parapara
- locality
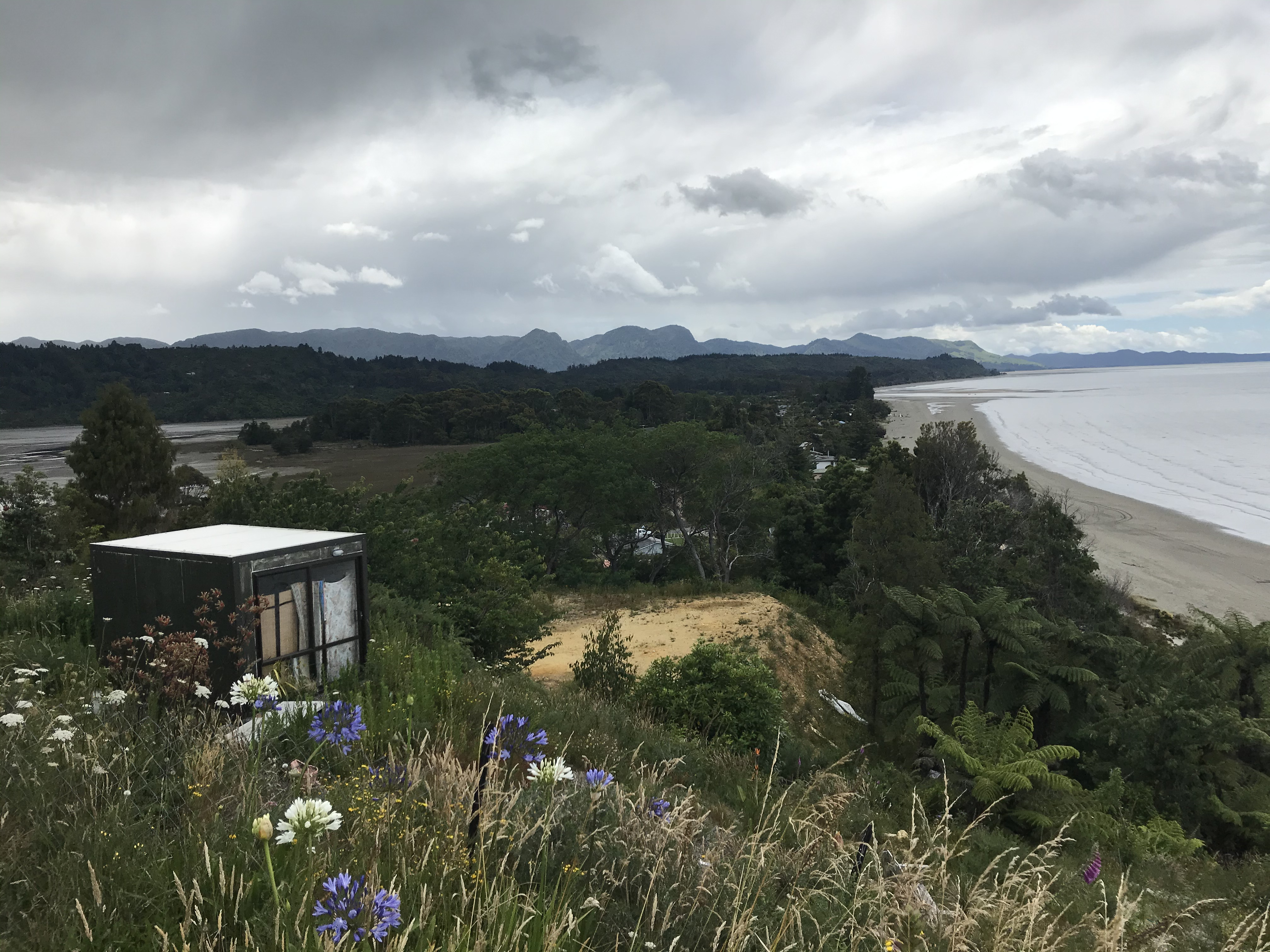
- View north along the beach
- Interactive map of Parapara
- Coordinates: 40°43′45″S 172°41′35″E
- Country: New Zealand
- Territorial authority: Tasman
- Ward: Golden Bay Ward
- Community: Golden Bay Community
- Electorates: West Coast-Tasman; Te Tai Tonga (Māori)

Government
  - Territorial authority: Tasman District Council
  - Mayor of Tasman: Tim King
  - West Coast-Tasman MP: Maureen Pugh
  - Te Tai Tonga MP: Tākuta Ferris

Area
  - Total: 0.69 km^{2} (0.27 sq mi)

Population (June 2025)
  - Total: 100
  - Density: 140/km^{2} (380/sq mi)
- Time zone: UTC+12 (NZST)
  - Summer (DST): UTC+13 (NZDT)
- Postcode: 7182

Parapara is a coastal location in the Tasman District of New Zealand. It is located near Golden Bay, close to the edge of the Parapara Inlet, between Tākaka and Collingwood. The location is rich in minerals and has a history of mining, mainly for gold and limonite ore.

== Māori settlement ==
The first settlers in the area were Ngāti Tūmatakōkiri, an iwi (tribe) from the Whanganui area that came to Parapara in the 16th century. These Māori settled around the Parapara Inlet. They named the place after a small island in their Polynesian homeland. By the early 1800s, Ngāti Apa ki te Rā Tō and Ngāi Tahu had displaced Ngāti Tūmatakōkiri. During the 1820s, Ngāti Tama came from the North Island and displaced the two iwi. During the mid-1830s, the iwi's rangatira, Te Pūoho-o-te-rangi, led further migration of his people from Taranaki to what is now the Tasman District and this resulted in tension. Te Pūoho-o-te-rangi himself moved south and settled at Parapara. From there, he started a raid against Ngāi Tahu in 1836 down the West Coast, across the Haast Pass into Otago, and into Southland, where he was killed by a party led by Tūhawaiki.

== Mining history ==
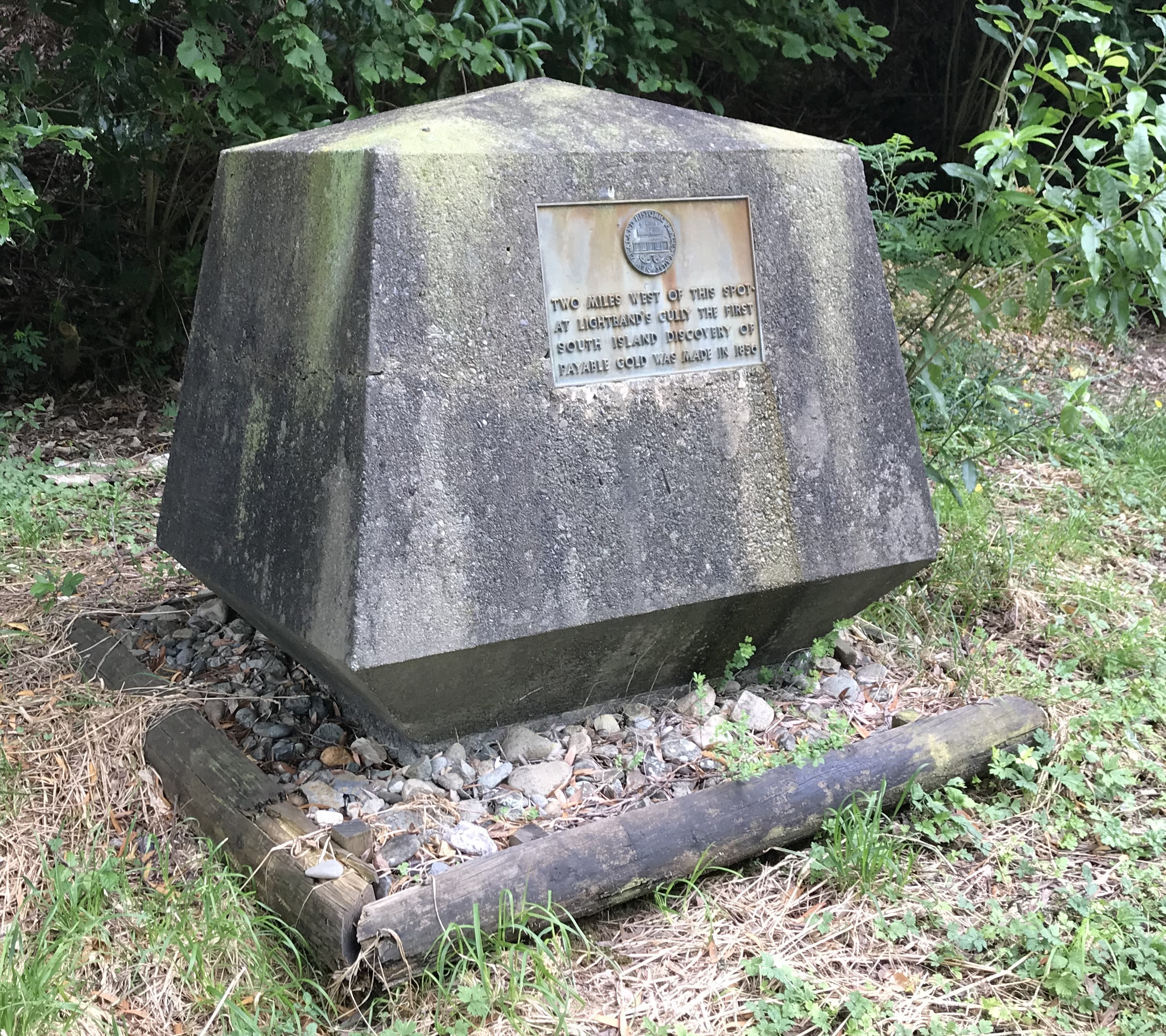
Lightband Gully memorial on the former highway in Parapara

The first European settlers came to Parapara in 1858. They were gold miners, having come across from the South Island's first payable gold discovery in 1856 in nearby Lightband Gully. In Parapara, they were first working on Richmond Hill and then down Sarah's Saddle. In the early 1860s, most of the miners left when the gold rushes started in Otago and near Hokitika. Some miners stayed on, though, and were mainly working in the Glen Gyle (which flows into the Parapara River), and on the Parapara flats.

The Parapara area is rich in several minerals. The district surveyor, Charles Lewis, collected half a ton of minerals for the Colonial and Indian Exhibition held in 1886 in London. Materials collected for this purpose included marble, silver ore, coal, galena, steatite, hematite, sand suitable for making glass, graphite, schorl, and iron pyrite.

Māori had made use of iron ore for making paint. Europeans did the same and in the early 1870s, iron ore from Parapara was shipped to Nelson and turned into paint there. The paint manufacture was undertaken in Parapara from the late 1870s. The machinery was driven by a waterwheel, with the water coming via a five-kilometre-long (3.1 mi) water race from Glen Gyle Creek. A tramway was built to get the ore from the quarry to the plant, and the bagged paint from the plant to the beach. Paint manufacture had stopped by 1922. A major customer for the red paint was the New Zealand Railways Department, which used it for its goods sheds and railway wagons. Other uses were at ship yards, foundries and on farms.

The manner of gold mining changed in the 1890s when mining companies took over, with miners employed on a wage and hydraulic sluicing became the main extraction method. The companies built three dams in the hills behind Parapara to have secure water supply for sluicing: Druggans Dam, Parapara Dam, and Boulder Lake. Druggans Dam is a 20-hectare (49-acre) reservoir. Parapara Dam is a dam in the Parapara River that was used to sluice the valley of the Glen Gyle Creek; the creek originally flowed into Appos Creek, which in turn drains into the Aorere River, but the miners removed a whole hillside and it now flows into Parapara River. At 985 metres (3,232 ft) above sea level, Boulder Lake is the highest of the lakes and is much smaller than originally as the dam got blown up in the 1930s.

A gold dredge was brought up from Dunedin to work in the Parapara Inlet. After working for a week or two, the dredge overturned and sank at the mouth of the Parapara River, resulting in a total loss.

== Settlement ==
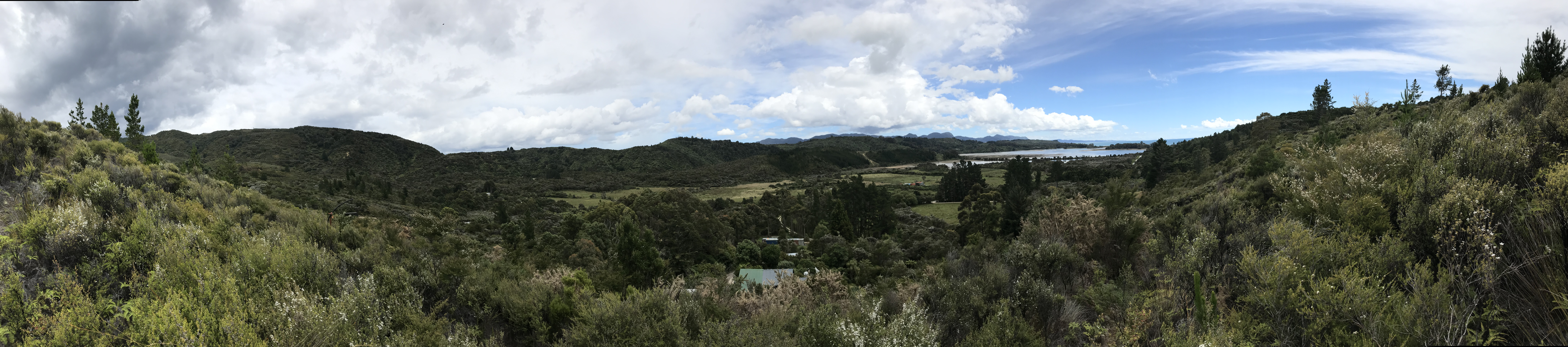
View from the quarry lake of Parapara and Parapara Inlet

Early land-based travel in Golden Bay was along the beach. Beacons were installed in 1885 to guide people across the mudflats but only after at least five people had drowned. Crossing of the Parapara Inlet at the mouth was not advised as it was too dangerous. The "inland road", much of which is now State Highway 60, was built in stages between Tākaka and Collingwood. A local contractor won the tender in May 1897 to form that part of the road that ran along the Parapara Inlet for NZ£33.

The authors of a local history book, Between the ports : Collingwood to Waitapu, state that Parapara was "liveliest" around 1900. In 1901, a hall was opened on land granted by a local land owner, with the building paid for by a mining company, some of the main shareholders, and a government subsidy. Premier Richard Seddon and Governor Lord Ranfurly visited Parapara on 18 February 1904, coming over from Collingwood for the day. The official party included Viscount Northland (the governor's son) and Albert Pitt (Attorney-General).

On 17 April 2014, the remnants of Cyclone Ita merged with a separate cyclone. This caused coastal erosion from Ruby Bay to Pākawau. The greatest damage was in Parapara, where much of Esplanade Road was washed away.

== Demographics ==
Parapara is described by Statistics New Zealand as a rural settlement. It covers 0.69 km^{2} (0.27 sq mi) and had an estimated population of 100 as of June 2025, with a population density of 145 people per km^{2}. It is part of the Golden Bay/Mohua SA2 statistical area.

Historical population
Year	Pop.	±% p.a.
1911	23	—
2006	96	+1.52%
2013	90	−0.92%
2018	96	+1.30%
2023	99	+0.62%

Parapara had a population of 99 in the 2023 New Zealand census, an increase of 3 people (3.1%) since the 2018 census, and an increase of 9 people (10.0%) since the 2013 census. There were 42 males and 57 females in 60 dwellings. 3.0% of people identified as LGBTIQ+. The median age was 59.6 years (compared with 38.1 years nationally). There were 9 people (9.1%) aged under 15 years, 9 (9.1%) aged 15 to 29, 45 (45.5%) aged 30 to 64, and 36 (36.4%) aged 65 or older.

People could identify as more than one ethnicity. The results were 93.9% European (Pākehā); 12.1% Māori; and 3.0% Middle Eastern, Latin American and African New Zealanders (MELAA). English was spoken by 100.0%, and other languages by 9.1%. New Zealand Sign Language was known by 3.0%. The percentage of people born overseas was 24.2, compared with 28.8% nationally.

The sole religious affiliation given was 27.3% Christian. People who answered that they had no religion were 60.6%, and 9.1% of people did not answer the census question.

Of those at least 15 years old, 36 (40.0%) people had a bachelor's or higher degree, 45 (50.0%) had a post-high school certificate or diploma, and 9 (10.0%) people exclusively held high school qualifications. The median income was $26,200, compared with $41,500 nationally. 6 people (6.7%) earned over $100,000 compared to 12.1% nationally. The employment status of those at least 15 was 27 (30.0%) full-time, 21 (23.3%) part-time, and 3 (3.3%) unemployed.
