= Little Slate River =

River in Tasman District, New Zealand

- Route of the Little Slate River
- Mouth of the Little Slate River Little Slate River (South Island)

Location
- Country: New Zealand

Physical characteristics
- Source
  - location: Mount Treblow
  - coordinates: 40°48′18″S 172°35′48″E
  - elevation: 468 metres (1,535 ft)
- Mouth
  - location: Aorere River
  - coordinates: 40°46′00″S 172°35′50″E

Basin features
- Progression: Little Slate River → Aorere River → Ruataniwha Inlet → Golden Bay / Mohua → Tasman Sea

The Little Slate River is a river of New Zealand's Tasman Region. As with its neighbour, the Slate River, it is a tributary of the Aorere River. The Little Slate meets the Aorere 15 kilometres southwest of Collingwood.

== See also ==
- List of rivers of New Zealand
