= 1872 City of Nelson by-election =

New Zealand by-election

The 1872 City of Nelson by-election was a by-election held on 27 May 1872 in the City of Nelson electorate during the 5th New Zealand Parliament.

The by-election was caused by the resignation of the incumbent MP Martin Lightband.

The by-election was won by David Luckie.

His victory was described as a victory for the government; his opponents were James Crowe Richmond and Alfred Saunders.

== Results ==
The following table gives the election result:

1872 City of Nelson by-election
Party	Candidate	Votes	%	±%
Independent	David Luckie	307	57.17	
Independent	James Crowe Richmond	156	29.05	
Independent	Alfred Saunders	74	13.78	
Turnout		537		
Majority		151	28.12	
