= Lightband Gully =

Valley in New Zealand; site of first payable gold discovery in South Island

- Lightbands Gully
- Floor elevation: 60–90 m (200–300 ft)

Geography
- Location: Parapara
- Country: New Zealand
- District: Tasman
- Coordinates: 40.750°S 172.641°E
- River: unnamed
- Interactive map of Lightband Gully

Lightband Gully, sometimes also Lightbands or Lightband's Gully, is a valley in the hills behind the Golden Bay / Mohua township of Parapara in New Zealand. The valley is notable as the site of the first payable gold discovery—in October 1856—in the South Island, and this started the Golden Bay gold rush. This gold rush, which lasted for three years, triggered a name change of the area, from Massacre Bay to Golden Bay.

== Location ==
Lightband Gully is a valley in the hills behind Parapara. The creek that flows through the valley is not named. The valley begins at the confluence of two creeks, one of which is Graham Creek. Lightband Gully's creek flows into Appos Creek, which in turn discharges into the Aorere River.

There is legal access—mostly via paper roads—from Plain Road: a corridor accesses Appos Flat, then descends along Appos Creek to its confluence with the creek coming out of Lightband Gully, with the paper road then following up the gully and beyond it along an unnamed tributary.

== History ==
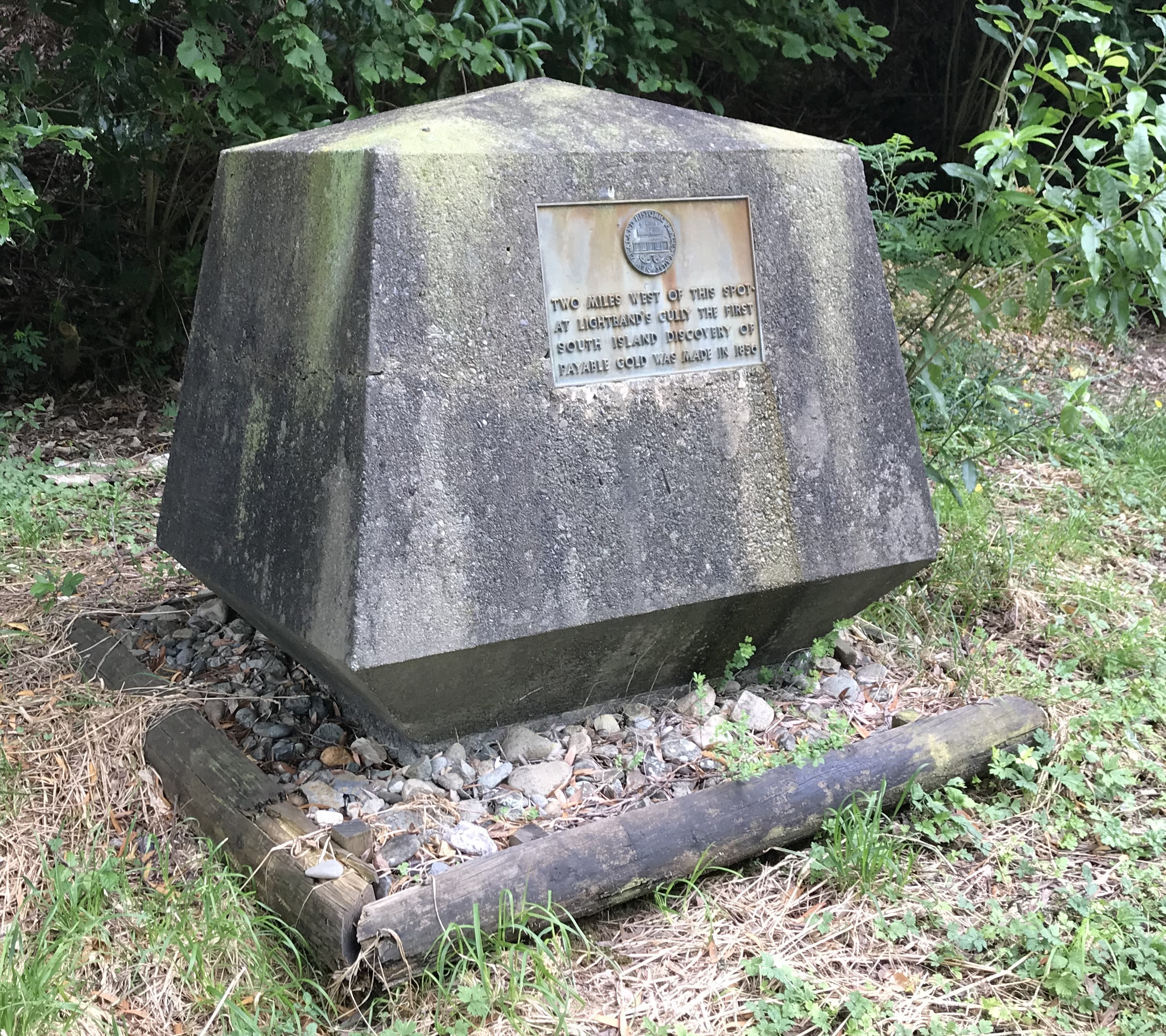
Lightband Gully memorial in Parapara

On 1 September 1856, Nelson banker David Sclanders chaired a meeting in Nelson at which it was decided to put forward a £500 bonus for the discovery of a "workable gold field" within the Nelson–Tasman area. John Ellis and John James found gold in October 1856 (Note: At the hearing for the gold bonus, they would later claim that they first found gold in July 1856; they put the date forward to increase their chances to obtain the payout. All later reports put the date at October 1856, though, for example this history.) at the point where Lightband Gully's creek flows into Appos Creek.

William Lightband, a son of George Lightband, was told about the find by Ellis and James. From 1851 to 1853, Lightband Jr. had been on Australian gold fields. Lightband Jr. and William Hough did some further prospecting at the original claim, and after a week they moved further up the valley. By February 1857, they found a location that gave good returns. That month, Lightband Jr. chaired a meeting where rules were agreed on for gold fields; these were adopted for all subsequent gold fields in the country.

The wider area proved to hold gold, and over the following three years, some 2000 miners came to the Aorere gold field. Finding gold triggered the change of the area's name: in 1642, Abel Tasman had called the area Murderers ("Moordenaers") Bay, which later became Massacre Bay, but this became Golden Bay in the 1850s. The bonus for the gold field discovery was never paid out.

There is a monument on the old alignment of State Highway 60 that commemorates Lightband Gully, which is 2 mi (3.2 km) inland from the location. The inscription reads:

Two miles west of this spot
at Lightband's Gully the first
South Island discovery of
payable gold was made in 1856

After the Cobb Reservoir and the Cobb Power Station had been completed in 1956, workers and machinery were shifted to Parapara to realign the state highway and build he causeway through the Parapara Inlet; the latter was under construction in the early 1960s. Since then, the monument has no longer been adjacent to the highway. (Note: The monument is located in what appears to be a private driveway, but the location remains legal road.) The gully was named for William Lightband.
