= Rocky River (New Zealand) =

River in Tasman District, New Zealand

- Route of the Rocky River
- Mouth of the Rocky River Rocky River (New Zealand) (South Island)

Location
- Country: New Zealand

Physical characteristics
- Source
  - coordinates: 40°53′07″S 172°35′39″E
- Mouth
  - location: Slate River
  - coordinates: 40°48′26″S 172°36′31″E

Basin features
- Progression: Rocky River → Slate River → Aorere River → Ruataniwha Inlet → Golden Bay / Mohua → Tasman Sea
- Tributaries
  - right: Mackenzie Creek, Forrester Creek

The Rocky River is a minor river in Kahurangi National Park in the South Island of New Zealand.

It feeds into the Slate River which in turn feeds into the Aorere River.
