= Druggans Dam =

New Zealand reservoir

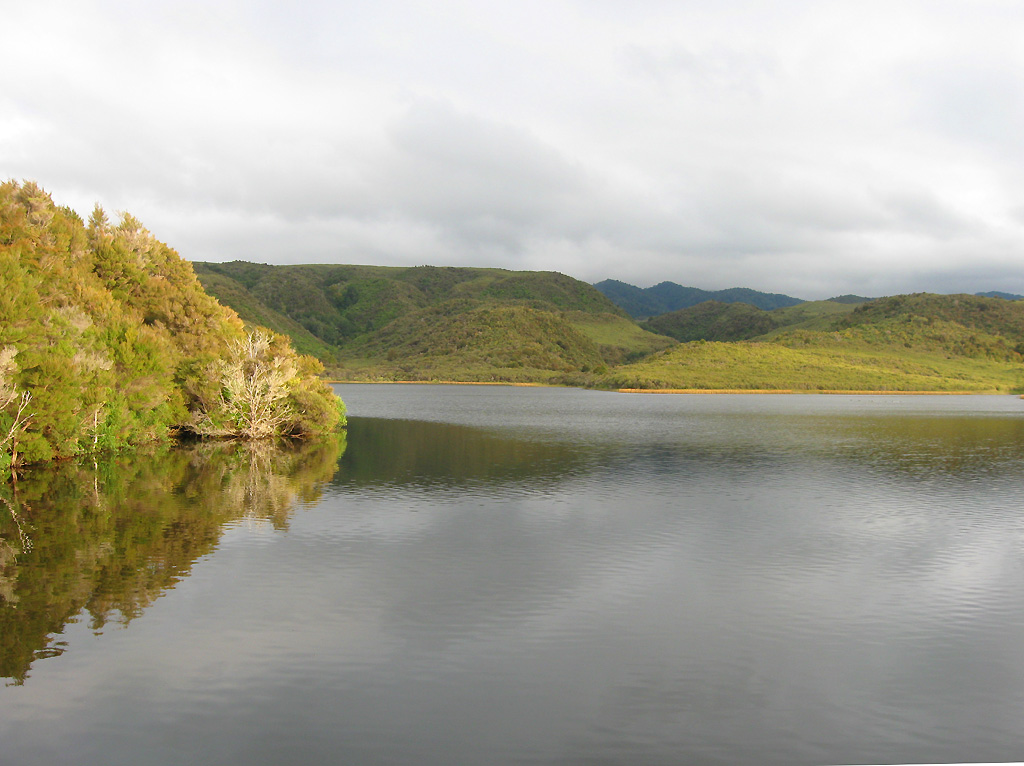
- Druggans Dam reservoir

- Location within New Zealand
- Location: New Zealand
- Coordinates: 40°46′03″S 172°38′14″E
- Type: reservoir
- Primary inflows: Cole, Coppermine and Sawpit Creeks
- Primary outflows: Stanton Creek
- Max. length: 595 metres (1,952 ft)
- Max. width: 490 metres (1,610 ft)
- Surface area: 20 hectares (49 acres)

Druggans Dam, for some time known as Toi Toi Flat Dam, is a reservoir in the Tasman District of the South Island of New Zealand. It was built to get water for gold-mining purposes.

== Geography ==
Druggans Dam is located approximately 1.45 kilometres (0.90 mi) east of the Slate River, approximately 1.8 kilometres (1.1 mi) southeast of the Aorere River, and approximately 10 kilometres (6.2 mi) south-southwest of Collingwood, which lies at the mouth of the Aorere River that flows into Golden Bay / Mohua. The lake covers an area of 20 hectares (49 acres) and has a shore length of around 2.46 kilometres (1.53 mi). The lake extends over a length of around 595 metres (1,952 ft) in an east–west direction and measures around 490 metres (1,610 ft) at its widest point in a north–south direction.

The reservoir is fed by several creeks that run from the south to the southeast. Drainage occurs via the barrier structure on the northwest side of the lake into Stanton Creek. Before the dam was built, the area was known as Toi Toi Flat. The original dam and lake was named after the miner who built the original dam, George Druggan. When the Slate River Sluicing Company took over and greatly increased the dam, they called it the Toi Toi Flat Dam.

== Dam structure ==
The dam structure, which is now overgrown with trees and plants, has a crown length of around 91 metres (299 ft) and a width at the base of 61 metres (200 ft). The dam, for which a volume of 23,000 cubic metres (810,000 cu ft) of earth was used, is around 18 metres (59 ft) high.

== History ==
The reservoir, which is a relic of the gold rush era, was used to store water for hydraulic mining. The water jets would blast open the slopes in the mining areas downstream to get the coveted precious metal. The original dam was built in c. 1873. The miner George Druggan bought the dam in 1876. Druggan gave up gold mining when he received an inheritance of £30,000 and went back to England. Druggan's claim was taken over by Joseph Benson and his wife Agnes in the early 1890s. After Benson came the Slate River Sluicing Company, registered in 1900, which promoted gold mining between the Slate River and Doctor's Creek and enlarged the lake's dam. However, the construction work did not pay off for the company, as the 1,152 ounces (32.7 kg) of gold recovered by 1905 did not offset the investment of £13,785. When the company was dissolved in 1909, all assets went to the Aorere Hydraulic Sluicing Company for £250, which continued to use the reservoir into the 1930s.
