= Martin Lightband =

New Zealand politician and businessperson (1832–1914)

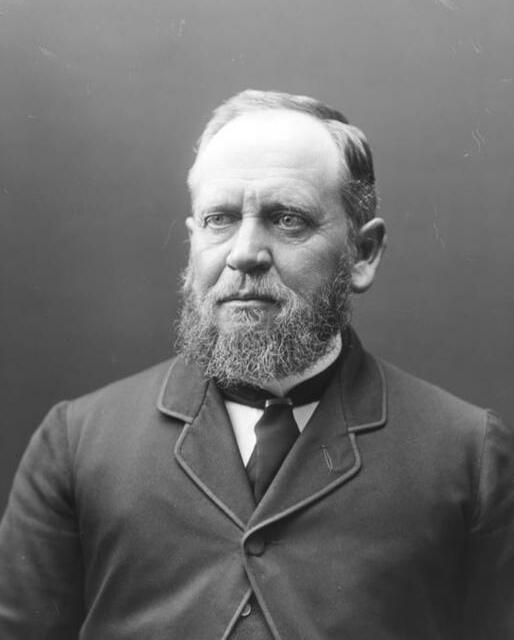

Member of the New Zealand Parliament for Nelson
- In office 6 February 1871 – 16 April 1872 Serving with Oswald Curtis
- Preceded by: Nathaniel Edwards
- Succeeded by: David Luckie

Personal details
- Born: 20 January 1832 Worcester, England
- Died: 1 August 1914 (aged 82) Nelson, New Zealand
- Resting place: Wakapuaka Cemetery, Nelson
- Spouse: Sarah Jane Jackson (m. 1855; died 1882)
- Relations: George Lightband (father); William Lightband (brother)
- Occupation: Tanner; Grain merchant; Politician

Martin Lightband (20 January 1832 – 1 August 1914) was a 19th-century Member of Parliament from Nelson, New Zealand.

== Early life ==
Born in Worcester, England, on 20 January 1832, he arrived at Nelson in 1842 on the Thomas Harrison with his parents, Mary Ann and George Lightband. Lightband was 10 years old when he arrived. William Lightband was a younger brother. He lived in Nelson almost his entire life, except for a brief stay in Christchurch.

In 1857, his father was part of the group of Nelson settlers eager to set up a newspaper in opposition to the Nelson Examiner that was influenced in its editorial policy by large landowners. Lightband Sr. travelled to Sydney, obtained a printing press and engaged the printer William Nation to come to Nelson with his family. Consequently, the Colonist was supportive of members of the Lightband family while the Nelson Examiner was not.

== Business interests ==
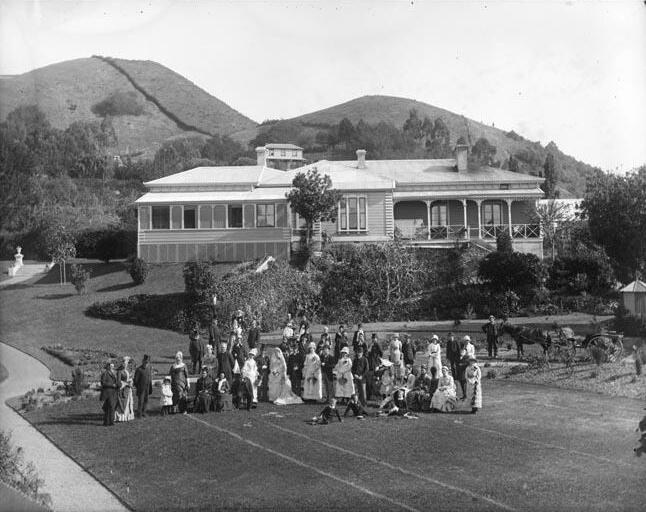
Wainui House, built for his father, in 1887

Lightband worked in his father's tanning business as a tanner. Later he went into partnership with Benjamin Jackson as boot, shoe, and leather merchants. In 1865 the partnership was dissolved and Lightband continued on his own in premises in Collingwood Street. In 1858 he was one of the founders of the Nelson Coal Mining Company and was involved in the development of the Pākawau coal mine. Lightband was elected a director of the unsuccessful Culliford Gold Mining Company in 1869 and in 1870 was one of the provisional directors of the Nelson Patent Slip Company.

In 1896 Lightband started in business as a grain merchant.

On 25 April 1888, he helped found the Nelson Bowling Club and his own lawn was used for matches until the club's greens were completed later in 1888.

== Political career ==
New Zealand Parliament
Years	Term	Electorate	Party
1871–1872	5th	Nelson	Independent

Lightband took a keen interest in Imperial, colonial, and local affairs. He was asked to stand in a by-election in the Buller electorate of Nelson Province in 1867, but declined. The budget of 1870 provoked heated discussion in Nelson and a public meeting was called to condemn it. Lightband spoke in the budget's favour and after further debate the meeting ended with those attending supporting the budget.

Lightband, in absentia, was put forward as a candidate for the 1871 election. He was described by Mr Burns, who nominated him, as a thorough hardworking, painstaking, straightforward businessman. Mr Tregea seconded the nomination. The candidates for election were Oswald Curtis, Lightband, James Crowe Richmond, and Joseph Shephard. Polling day was 6 February 1871. In his election campaign he spoke support for the Vogel Scheme with the proviso that the money was spent wisely and for immigration provided it was to the betterment of the colony. He was also in favour of taxing property and income, but not in favour of compulsory education due to the financial constraints of the time. New Zealand was described as in a depression and heavily dependent on borrowing. The editorial of the Nelson Examiner and New Zealand Chronicle dismissed Lightband as "but a tyro in politics, and that his opinions are crude and but half formed." The paper's editor supported Richmond, a Stafford supporter, as did Curtis. Lightband was considered a Liberal for supporting Vogel.

Lightband and Curtis were elected to represent Nelson. Lightband represented the City of Nelson electorate from 1871 to 1872, when he resigned. On 25 August 1871 he was appointed to a Select Committee on the producing and manufacturing resources of the colony. Among the more unusual recommendations of the committee was encouraging German migrants to come and grow beetroot.

In September Lighband supported the abolition of grand juries. Later during his term the Nelson-Foxhill railway was approved for construction. Lightband supported its construction.

Despite being opposed to Stafford when elected and during his term in Parliament, Lightband spoke highly of him. Stafford stated that he considered Lightband among the men he would like to see at the head of the colony's affairs.

=== Wooden tramway dispute ===
On 8 January 1872 the Nelson Evening Mail published and article suggesting wooden tramways in the Upper Buller District. Lightband then wrote to the Evening Mail supporting the construction of wooden tramways within the area. The letter seemed to imply that he preferred these over conventional railways such as the proposed Nelson-Foxhill Line. The paper's editor then responded suggesting that Lightband was vacillating and not standing for what he had said he would. In a letter to the editor, prominent citizen Wm Rout wrote expressing concern and dismay at Lightband's letter. Similar letters followed from others. Even the Colonist, which supported Lightband, expressed concern in its editorial, but noted that as Lightband was absent from Nelson they would need to wait for clarification. On his return at the end of January from the West Coast, Lightband responded to his critics. He stated that in his opinion the proposed Nelson-Foxhill line would take a long time to construct and that his preference was for a more rapid opening up of the area, hence the wooden tramway. The debate continued with support for Lightband coming from outlying areas and opposition from within his electorate.

On 19 March 1872 the Colonist editorial announced Lightband's intention to sail for England via San Francisco in April of the year. It also stated that he would be resigning from parliament. Whether his resignation and journey were because of the controversy or not is not stated. Sir David Monro, Richmond, and David Luckie stood to replace him. Lightband's letter of 16 April gave formal notice of his resignation and was published in Nelson Evening Mail.

=== Journey to England ===
Lightband sailed from Nelson to Manukau on the steamer Phoebe on 16 April, the same day as his resignation. His journey to England was via Honolulu, San Francisco, thence overland to New York. He intended to travel for about nine months, promoting New Zealand. Lightband sailed from Auckland on the 2,166 ton paddle steamer Nevada on 21 April. News of his arrival in England was reported in the Nelson Evening Mail on 11 September. Citing a European Mail correspondent, Anglo Australian, it said that Lightband was dissatisfied with the Honolulu to San Francisco leg of his journey and hoped to find any novelties in England that might advance New Zealand industry.

Lightband sailed from Galle on the P&O 1,790 ton steamship RMSS Behar on 28 October 1872. The ship encountered rough weather during its passage, arriving in King George Sound on 14 November 1872. Lighband sailed with the ship to Melbourne.

Given Lightband sailed from Galle to Australia on his return voyage, his most likely route would have been from Southampton to Alexandria in Egypt, overland to Suez, and then steamship to Galle. If Lightband was feeling particularly prosperous he may have sailed through the Suez Canal, but it was more expensive and slower than the overland route by rail to Suez.

From Melbourne, Lightband sailed to Bluff on the 765 ton steam ship Albambra. It left Port Phillip on 8 December 1872 and arrived at Bluff on 12 December 1872 along with his wife and child. They reached Nelson on 20 December.

=== Return to local politics ===
By mid-May 1873 he was again advocating opening of access to the Buller-Reefton area to enable the exploitation of its mineral reserves. Then in July 1873 he wrote to the Editor of the Nelson Examiner and New Zealand Chronicle supporting the establishment of a Municipality. In late July early August 1873 he had joined the outcry against proposed increased tariffs on goods, although he was in favour of using them to protect local industry.

In 1902 he was elected to the Nelson City Council and remained a Councillor almost up until his death.

"Wainui" is in Nile Street East, Nelson and was built by his father. Lightband's wife advertised for a female servant in 1859, suggesting that the family were relatively well off from early on.

== Family ==
Lightband married Sarah Jane Jackson on 5 April 1855 at Allington. (Note: This was a locality on the main road between Richmond and Brightwater, just north of the Wairoa River; it does not exist any longer.)) His wife died at Torquay in 1882 while they were residing in England. On 1 March 1883, he married Mary McDouall Stuart in Opawa, Christchurch. Lightband died peacefully in his sleep at his home "Wainui" on 1 August 1914, (Note: His obituary in the Nelson Evening Mail records that he "passed away ... at a late hour on Saturday night", i.e. 1 August. His gravestone at Wakapuaka Cemetery shows 2 August as the death date. His death certificate–1914/5659—shows 2 August as the death date.) after suffering a stroke several days earlier. He was survived by his second wife. He was 82. (Note: The obituary in the Nelson Evening Mail incorrectly stated that he was 83.)

Lightband's younger brother, William Lightband, was killed in a canoe accident at Tāhunanui on or shortly after 4 May 1909.

== Notes ==
New Zealand Parliament
Preceded by Nathaniel Edwards	Member of Parliament for Nelson; 1871–1872; Served alongside: Oswald Curtis	Succeeded by David Luckie
