= Parapara River =

River in Tasman District, New Zealand

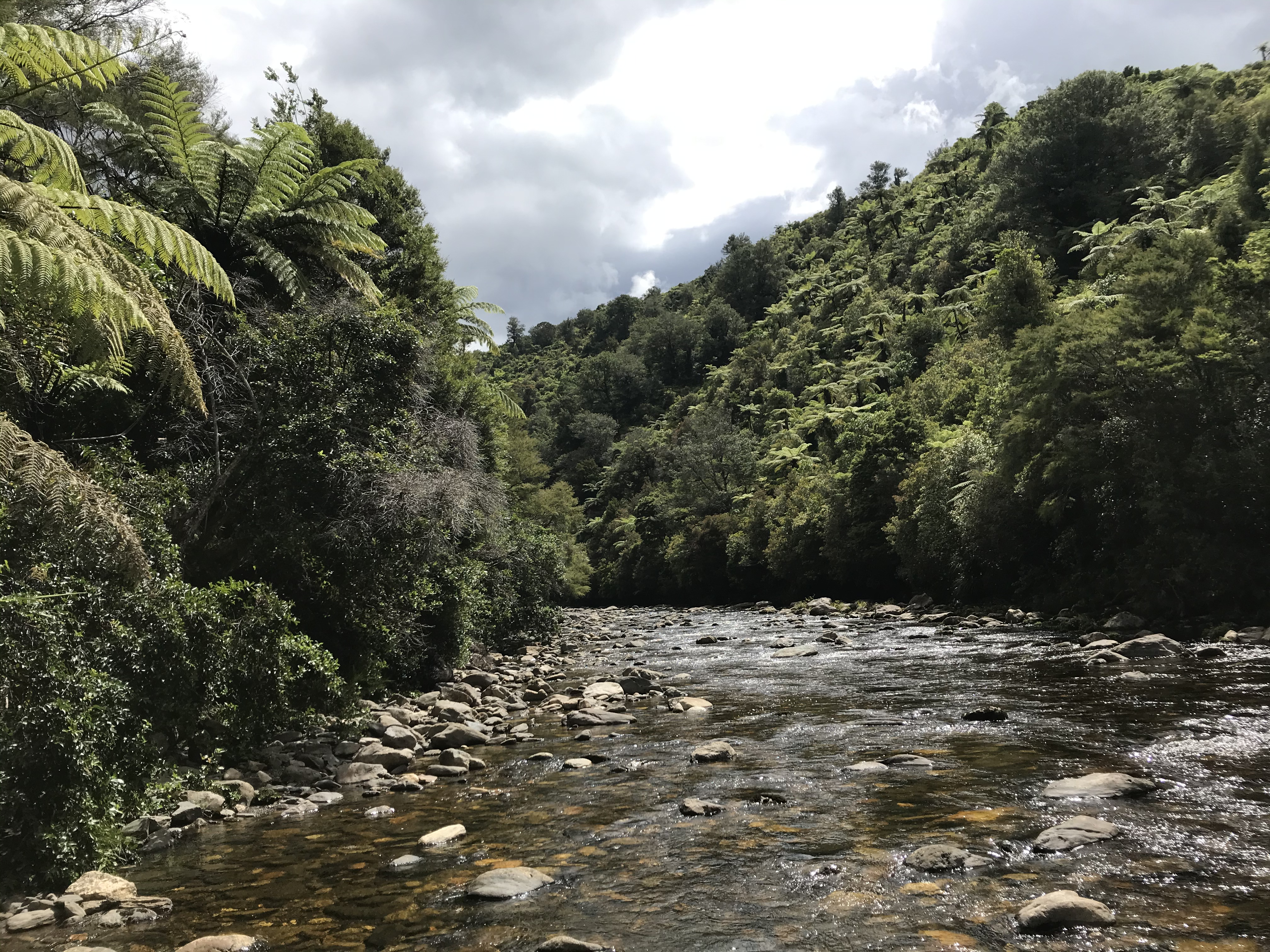
- Route of the Parapara River
- Mouth of the Parapara River Parapara River (South Island)

Location
- Country: New Zealand

Physical characteristics
- Source
  - location: Parapara Peak
  - coordinates: 40°50′11″S 172°38′50″E
  - elevation: 1,249 metres (4,098 ft)
- Mouth
  - location: Parapara Inlet
  - coordinates: 40°43′42″S 172°40′48″E
  - elevation: 0 metres (0 ft)
- Length: 20 km (12 mi)

Basin features
- Progression: Parapara River → Parapara Inlet → Golden Bay / Mohua → Tasman Sea
- Tributaries
  - left: Blue Creek, Greenwood Creek, Glen Gyle Creek, Raby Riley Gully
  - right: Grueby Creek, Happy Valley Stream, Dam Creek, Washbourn Creek

The Parapara River is a river of the Tasman Region of New Zealand's South Island. It flows generally north from its watershed in the Kahurangi National Park, reaching Golden Bay at the small settlement of Parapara, 5 kilometres south of Collingwood.

In Māori tradition, the river is inhabited by a taniwha called Kaiwhakaruaki, who used to attack the people of Motueka and Tākaka. This tradition derives from Society Islands in Polynesia, where a monstrous shark called 'Aifa'arua'i (a cognate of Kaiwhakaruaki) is said to have lived in the Parapara Strait between Motue'a and Taha'a islands (cognates of Motueka and Tahaka).

== See also ==
- List of rivers of New Zealand
