= Boulder River (New Zealand) =

River in Tasman District, New Zealand

- Route of the Boulder River
- Mouth of the Boulder River Boulder River (New Zealand) (South Island)

Location
- Country: New Zealand

Physical characteristics
- Source
  - location: Boulder Lake
  - coordinates: 40°53′21″S 172°34′30″E
  - elevation: 985 metres (3,232 ft)
- Mouth
  - location: Aorere River
  - coordinates: 40°48′09″S 172°32′56″E

Basin features
- Progression: Boulder River → Aorere River → Ruataniwha Inlet → Golden Bay / Mohua → Tasman Sea
- Tributaries
  - left: Amphitheatre Creek
  - right: Parson Creek

The Boulder River is a small river in the north of the South Island of New Zealand.

The headwaters are at the Kahurangi National Park's small Boulder Lake. The river flows north for 10 kilometres (6 mi) before draining into the Aorere River.
