= Snow River (New Zealand) =

River in Tasman District, New Zealand

- Route of the Snow River
- Mouth of the Snow River Snow River (New Zealand) (South Island)

Location
- Country: New Zealand

Physical characteristics
- Source
  - location: Haupiri Range
  - coordinates: 40°54′47″S 172°36′07″E
  - elevation: 1,360 metres (4,460 ft)
- Mouth
  - location: Slate River
  - coordinates: 40°49′36″S 172°36′52″E
  - elevation: 202 metres (663 ft)
- Length: 11 kilometres (6.8 mi)

Basin features
- Progression: Snow River → Slate River → Aorere River → Ruataniwha Inlet → Golden Bay / Mohua → Tasman Sea
- Tributaries
  - left: Bray Creek, Specimen Creek, No Man Creek, Waterfall Creek
  - right: Slip Creek

The Snow River is a river in the Tasman Region of the South Island of New Zealand. It rises at the western end of the Haupiri Range and flows northward before rounding the tip of Kill Devil Spur to join the Slate River. The Slate is a tributary of the Aorere, the major river of the northwestern Tasman region.

The Snow River is named for George Snow and one of his brothers (the source does not specify which brother). Snow was a goldminer and hotelier based in Collingwood. His grandson was the Olympic rower Darcy Hadfield.
