= David Luckie =

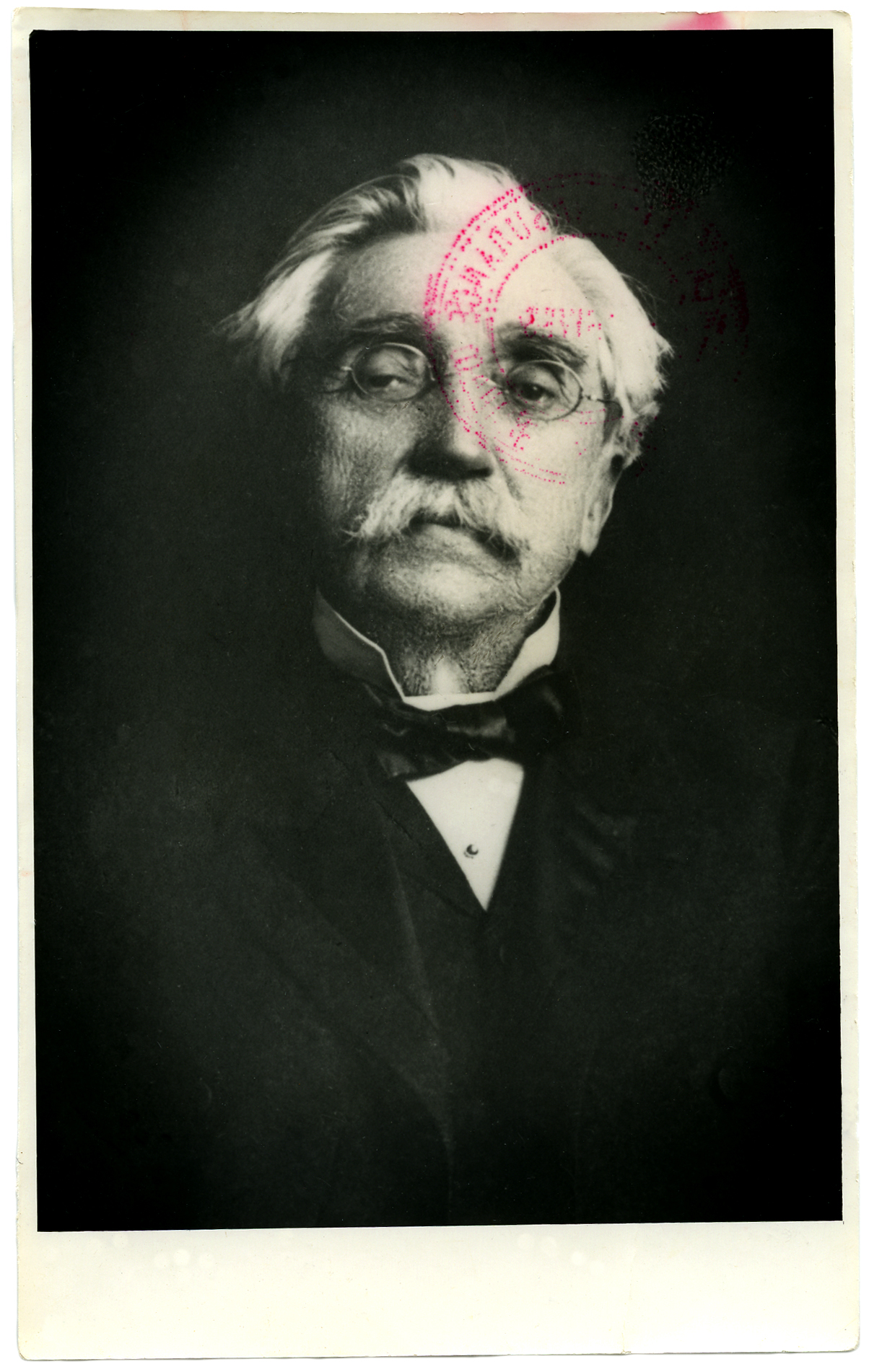
David Luckie

David Mitchell Luckie (5 October 1827 – 6 May 1909) was a 19th-century Member of Parliament from Nelson, New Zealand. He was a editor of several newspapers throughout his life, culminating in the The New Zealand Herald. He played key roles in the apprehension of the Maungatapu murderers, and caused the 1873 Russian Scare.

== Background ==
Luckie was born in Montrose, Forfarshire, Scotland, on 5 October 1827. He was the son of Thomas Luckie, a merchant, and Mary Mitchell. Educated in Montrose he first worked in a mercantile office, then as a law clerk before working starting his newspaper career. He married Fanny Clara Dickinson on 23 April 1861 at Ashton under Lyne, Lancashire.

Luckie emigrated New Zealand in 1863 with his family, shortly after being offered the editorship of the Arbroath Guide.

== Newspaper career ==
He became editor and part owner, with William Nation, of the Colonist in Nelson. His first editorial appeared on 31 March 1863, the day after he arrived on the Electra from London. He became noted for the "stinging lash of his invective and sarcasm". In 1873 Luckie moved to Auckland to become editor of the Daily Southern Cross, and from 1 January 1877 was associated with William Berry in the editorship of The New Zealand Herald after the two newspapers merged.

=== Maungatapu murders ===
Luckie achieved national prominence in 1866 for his part in apprehending the four men found guilty of the Maungatapu murders. He had chaired a meeting to raise money for a search for the missing party. He also reported the court proceedings and published an illustrated narrative of the murders.

=== The Russian Scare ===
Luckie, along with many New Zealanders, was concerned about the possibility of a Russian invasion. In 1873 he published a hoax report in the Daily Southern Cross about a Russian invasion of Auckland by the cruiser Kaskowiski (a wordplay on "cask of whisky"). Many Aucklanders believed the report and were alarmed to read that the crew of the Kaskowiski had seized gold and taken the mayor as hostage.

== Political career ==
New Zealand Parliament
Years	Term	Electorate	Party
1872–1875	5th	Nelson	Independent

Luckie unsuccessfully contested the City of Nelson electorate for the House of Representatives in February 1866. He did gain a seat on the Nelson Provincial Council from 1869 to 1873. In 1872 he was elected to Parliament as the member for Nelson, and held the seat until 1875. In the 1872 election, Luckie had gained 307 votes against James Crowe Richmond's 156 and Alfred Saunders's 74. Luckie supported the Fox ministry's attempts to establish 'peace and progress', advocating direct taxation and 'economical administration'. The Lyttelton Times considered that Luckie would give the government 'fair and reasonable, but ... discriminating and independent support'; but the Wellington Evening Post considered him a political turncoat: 'Vain, pretentious, utterly selfish, gifted with a shallow cleverness, and possessed of unbounded audacity. ... Formerly a thick and thin partisan of Mr Stafford, he has now transferred his allegiance to Mr Fox'.

== Public servant ==
In 1878 Luckie moved to Wellington to take up the editorship of The Evening Post. He held the position for six months, before being offered and accepting the position of government insurance commissioner, in return for his support of the government by John Ballance. Balance offered Luckie the job at an £800 salary, but Premier George Grey considered £200 sufficient. Parliament ratified the £800 salary. Luckie began to suffer from ill health and in 1889 stepped down from the position.

He continued to write many leading articles for Wellington newspapers, frequented the parliamentary press gallery, and was an honorary member of the New Zealand Institute of Journalists. Luckie retired on 16 December 1908 and died in Wellington on 6 May 1909. He was survived by his wife, four sons, and two daughters.

== Notes ==
New Zealand Parliament
Preceded by Martin Lightband	Member of Parliament for Nelson; 1872–1875; Served alongside: Oswald Curtis	Succeeded by John Sharp
