= Boulder Lake (New Zealand) =

Lake in Tasman, New Zealand

Coordinates: 40.894°S 172.579°E

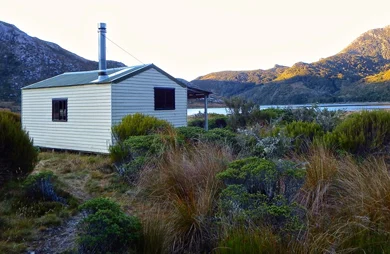
Boulder Lake Hut on the shores of Boulder Lake

Boulder Lake (elevation 985 metres or 3,232 feet) is a lake in the Tasman District of New Zealand located within Kahurangi National Park. In the late 1890s and early 1900s, water from the lake was used for gold mining purposes for which the lake level was raised by a low dam. British investors lost much money with the venture and large scale mining stopped in 1905 when a flood took out part of the flume. The dam was blown up in the 1930s by a farmer disgruntled with depression-era gold miners stealing his sheep. Boulder Lake is today a tramping destination, with the Department of Conservation maintaining both a hut at the lake and a track to the lake.

== Description ==
Several creeks, many of them coming from the Colosseum Ridge, flow into the lake. The outflow is the Boulder River.

== Mining history ==
The Collingwood Goldfields Company built a dam in 1899 and although it was only 3 metres (9.8 ft) high, it doubled the size of the lake. The lake water was used for mining gold through sluicing and 8 kilometres (5.0 mi) of flume was built. As the site was above the tree line, the company purchased a large area within the upper Aorere Valley, installed a sawmill, and built a tramway of 6.4 kilometres (4 mi) into the hills. The timber was punted across the Aorere River before the tram transported it towards Boulder Lake to build the flume. Sluicing started on 28 August 1899, but the yield of gold was much less than anticipated.

The Collingwood Goldfields Company, headquartered in London, went into liquidation during 1900 and was refloated in the same year with new capital. Also in 1900, the sawmill in the Aorere Valley was sold to Auckland. The company remained in a difficult financial position and in December 1901, it sold its assets at auction; the purchaser was Charles Fell, who had been acting as the company's solicitor. When a flood destroyed part of the fluming in 1905, operations ceased.

The dam was blown up in the 1930s by a farmer disgruntled with desperate miners stealing his sheep during the Great Depression.

== Current use ==
The Golden Bay Alpine and Tramping Club formed in 1961 and in 1962, Boulder Lake Hut was built by its members. A second hut was built by the Department of Conservation (DOC) during the 1994/95 summer and the older hut has since served as a woodshed.

DOC maintains a tramping track from the road end near Bainham to Boulder Lake Hut. The walk to the hut takes between eight and ten hours (one way) and requires moderate fitness and moderate tramping experience. From a vantage point near the remains of the lake dam, a 65 metres (213 ft) waterfall can be viewed; this is the beginning of the Boulder River.
