= Kaituna River (Tasman) =

River in Tasman District, New Zealand

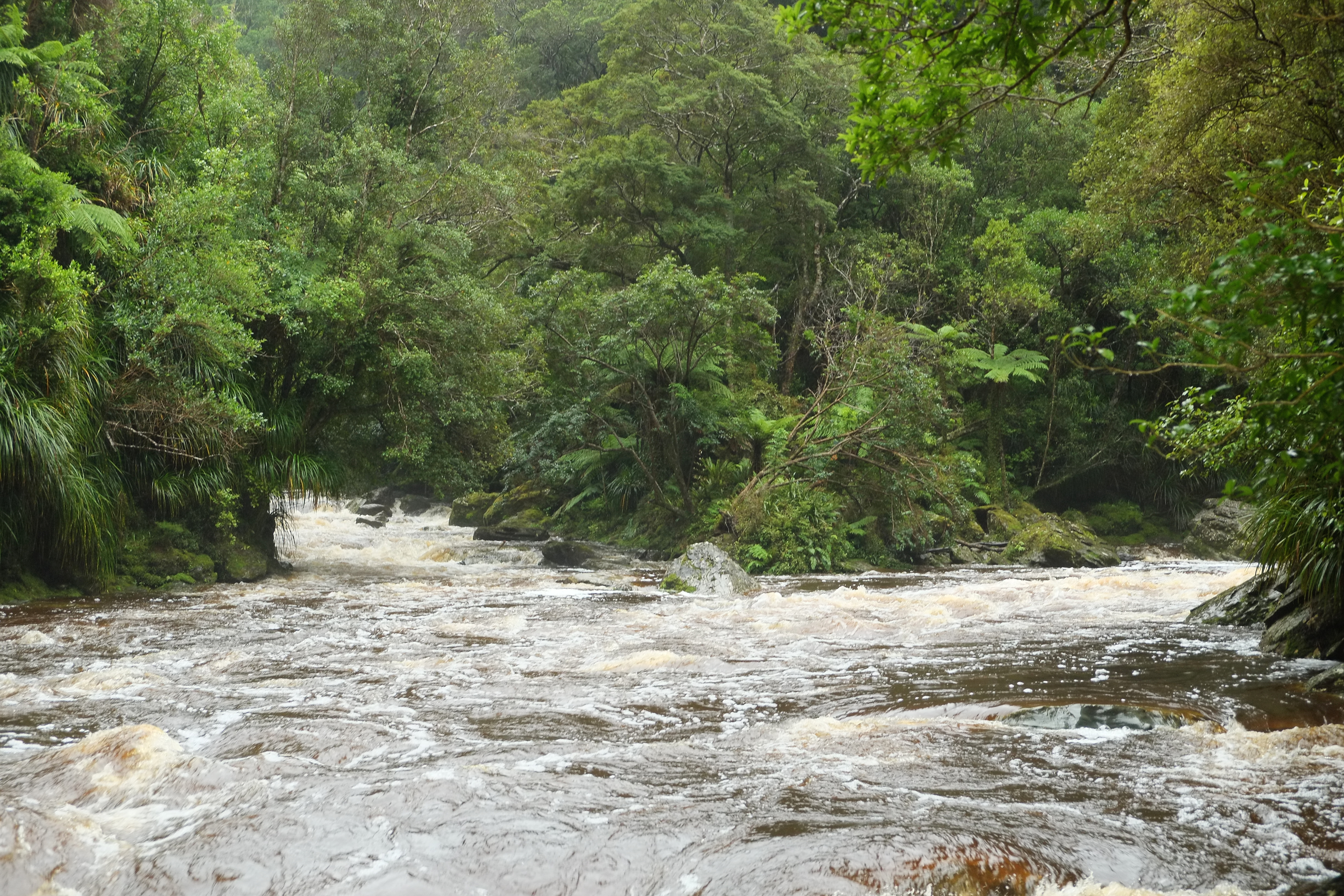
- Kaituna Forks
- Route of the Kaituna River
- Mouth of the Kaituna River Kaituna River (Tasman) (South Island)

Location
- Country: New Zealand

Physical characteristics
- Source
  - coordinates: 40°40′19″S 172°33′13″E
- Mouth
  - location: Aorere River
  - coordinates: 40°42′06″S 172°37′00″E
  - elevation: 0 metres (0 ft)

Basin features
- Progression: Kaituna River → Aorere River → Golden Bay / Mohua → Tasman Sea
- Tributaries
  - left: Little Granity Creek
  - right: Victoria Creek, Bonny Doon Creek, Scott Creek, King Creek, MacKay Creek

The Kaituna River is a river in Tasman District's Golden Bay / Mohua, New Zealand.

== Location ==
The Kaituna River originates in Kahurangi National Park. It flows through a valley that forms the boundary between the Burnett Range and the Wakamarama Range. The Kaituna Track, which runs between the hamlet of Aorere and Whanganui Inlet, follows the river from the end of Carter Road to Kaituna Forks, from where the track climbs up onto the ridge east of the river valley.

The Kaituna River flows into the Aorere River north of Rockville.

== Gold mining ==
New Zealand's first gold rush occurred in the Aorere Valley and surrounding areas from 1857. One of the gold fields was just off the Kaituna River and this was the reason for the Kaituna Track to be built.

== Cyclone Gita ==
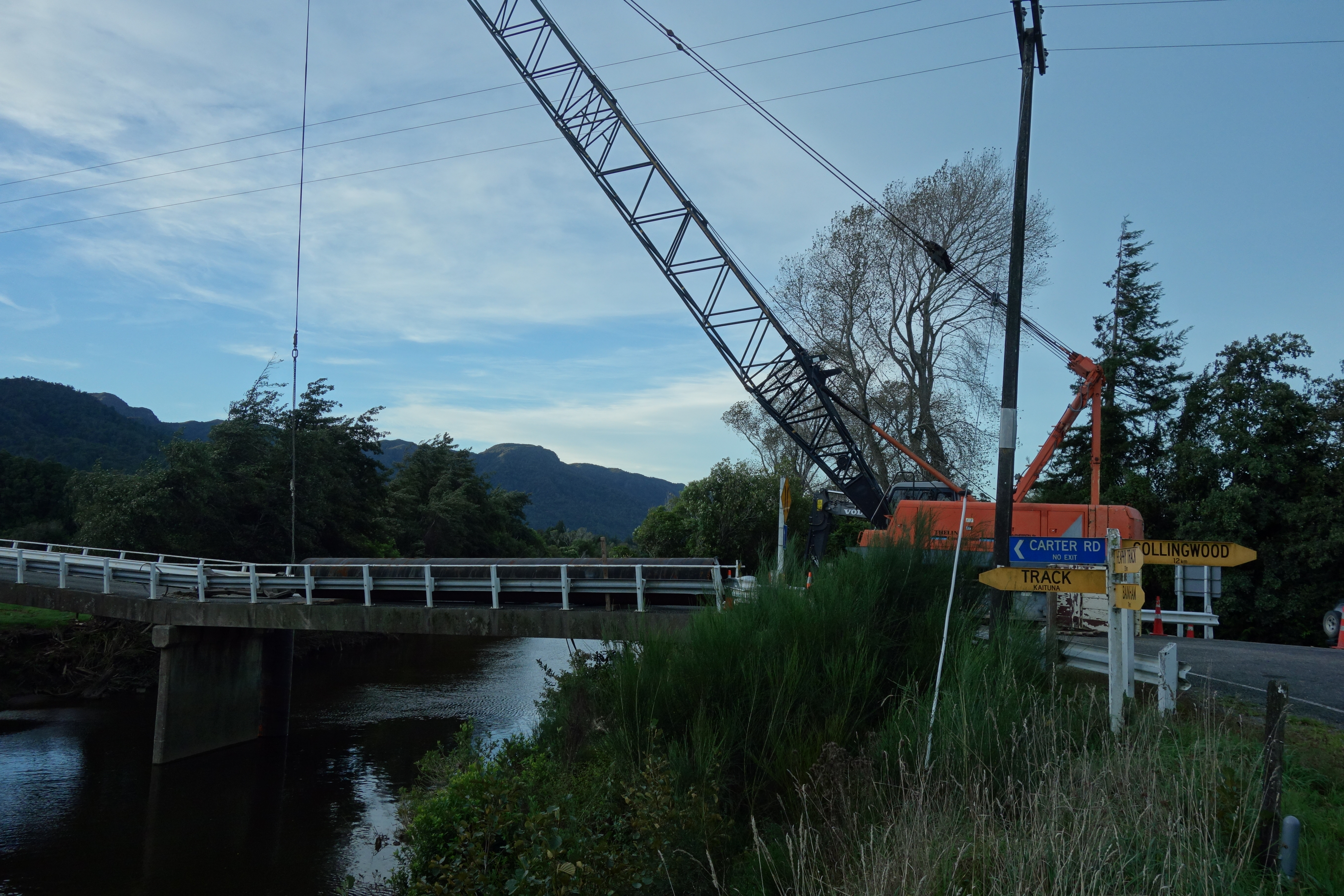
Kaituna River Bridge repair in April 2018

In February 2018, Cyclone Gita caused destruction along the Kaituna River. At first, debris from a slip upstream blocked and then destroyed Carters Bridge near the Carter Road beginning of the Kaituna Track. The resulting flood wave washed a shipping container off a farm property that damaged the Kaituna River Bridge in Aorere. This closed access for locals and the tankers that collect the milk from 1,000 dairy cows. The third bridge over the Kaituna River, further downstream off Solly Road and privately owned, was used after farmers and local contractors built a new 1,000 metres (3,300 ft) road through a paddock to make a connection to the cut off-road network.
