= George Lightband =

New Zealand settler (1804–1891)

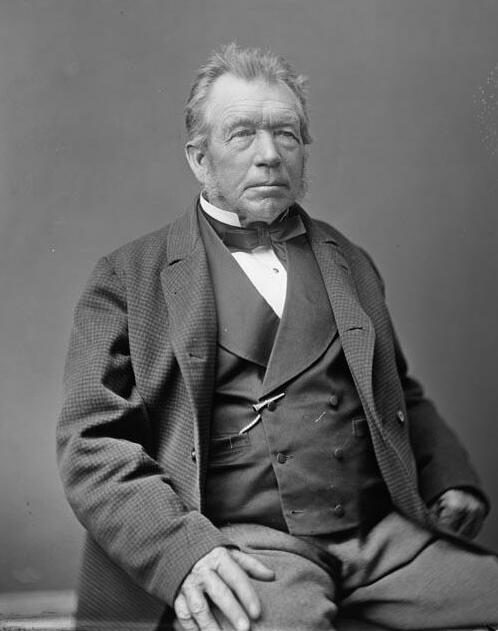
- Lightband in 1879
- Born: 1804; Worcester, England
- Died: 22 October 1891 (aged 86–87); Nelson, New Zealand
- Relatives: Martin Lightband (son); William Lightband (son)

George Wales Lightband (1804 – 22 October 1891) was a pioneer settler in Nelson, New Zealand.

== Biography ==
Lightband was born in Worcester, England, in 1804. He married Mary Ann on 11 June 1824. They received medical advice that his wife would live for just two or three more years if they remained in England and consequently, they emigrated on the Thomas Harrison, which arrived in Nelson on 25 October 1842. They immigrated with three boys (including Martin and William) and one girl.

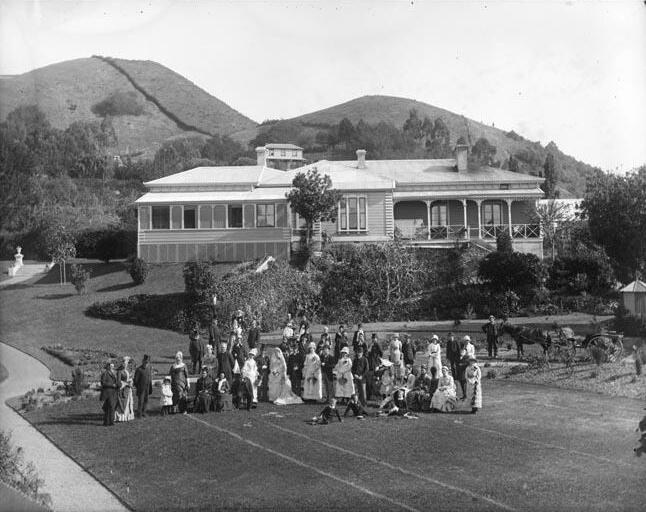
Wainui in 1887

Lightband had learned the tannery trade and continued this occupation in New Zealand. He was inventive and pioneered many processing in the leather industry. He was the first person in the colony who produced parchment. He was part of the group of Nelson settlers eager to set up a newspaper in opposition to the Nelson Examiner that was influenced in its editorial policy by large landowners. Lightband travelled to Sydney, obtained a printing press and engaged the printer William Nation to come to Nelson with his family. The first issue of The Colonist appeared on 23 October 1857.

Lightband selected a section on Nile Street near the Maitai River and the family camped on the land the day after their arrival. He was given some gooseberry plants by William Fox and for many decades, the family celebrated each anniversary of their arrival in Nelson by making the first gooseberry pudding of the season for that day. A devout Methodist all his life, their first home was called "Bethel". His later house, "Wainui", still stands.

Lightband's wife died on 25 August 1890 aged 88. He died at their home on 22 October 1891.
