= William Lightband =

New Zealand gold miner, tanner, and orchardist (1834–1909)

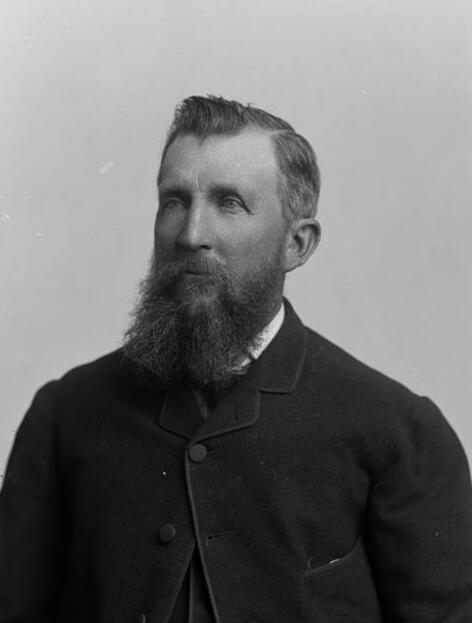
- Lightband (year unknown)
- Born: George William Wales Lightband; 1834; Worcester, England
- Died: c.4 May 1909 (aged 74–75); Tasman Bay / Te Tai-o-Aorere
- Body discovered: Moturoa / Rabbit Island
- Resting place: Wakapuaka Cemetery
- Other names: G. W. W. Lightband
- Occupations: gold miner; tanner; orchardist
- Known for: Golden Bay gold rush; Lightband Gully
- Father: George Lightband
- Relatives: Martin Lightband (brother)

George William Wales Lightband (1834 – c. 4 May 1909) was a gold miner, tanner, and orchardist in New Zealand. He came to New Zealand from England as a boy with his family. He became prominent through gold mining and is connected with the beginning of the Golden Bay gold rush, with Lightband Gully as the original location of gold discovery named after him.

== Early life ==
Lightband was born in 1834 (Note: His gravestone in Wakapuaka Cemetery states that he was born on 10 July 1833. All obituaries state that he was born in 1834, e.g. the one published by the Nelson Evening Mail.) in Worcester, England. George Lightband (1804–1891) was his father. He came to New Zealand on the barque Thomas Harrison, arriving in Nelson on 25 October 1842. His father was a tanner and Lightband Jr. worked for him until 1851.

== Gold mining ==
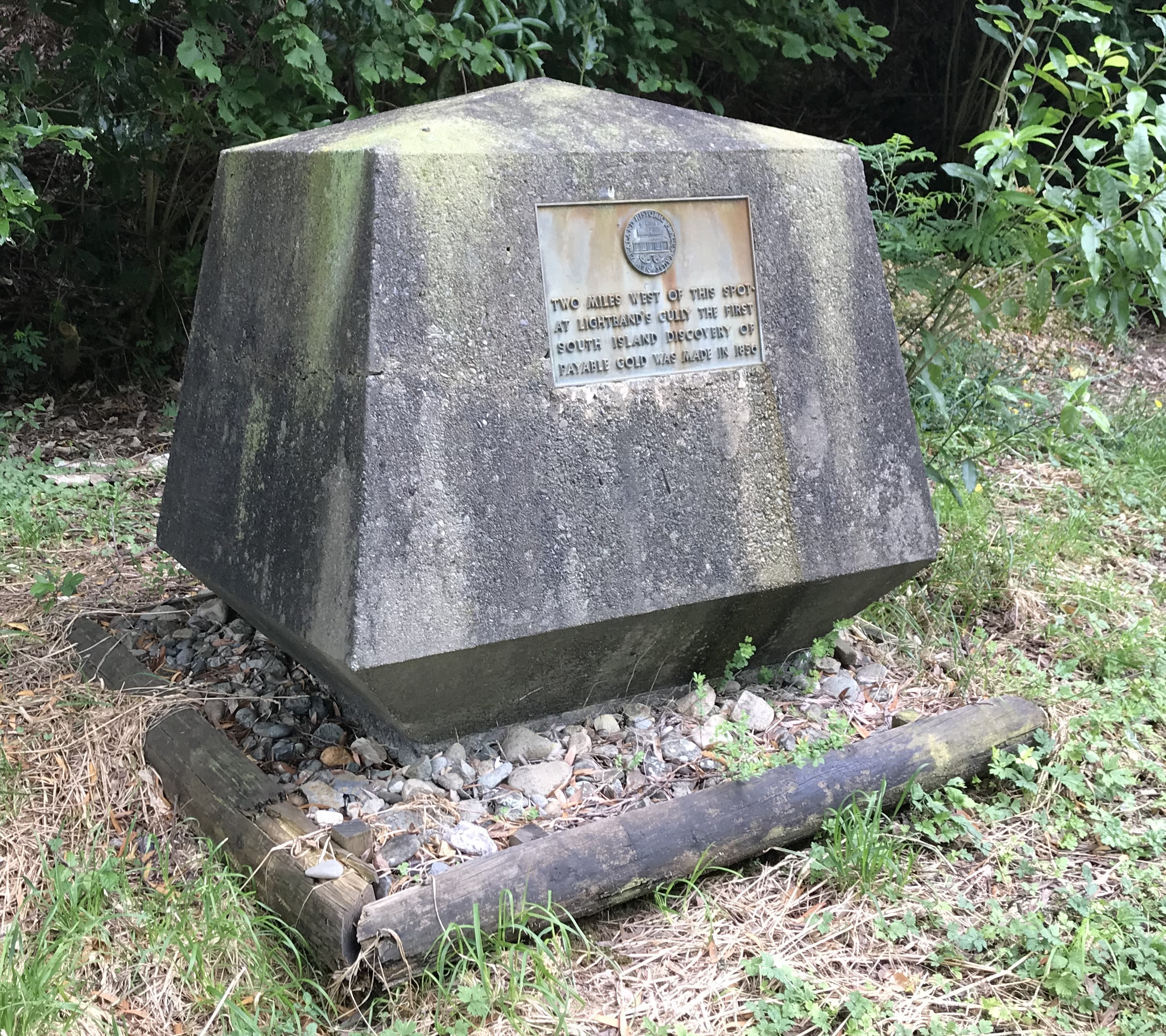
Lightband Gully memorial in Parapara

In 1851, he went to the Victorian gold fields with William Calverly Riley from Collingwood and Henry Douglas Jackson, who would later marry his sister Sarah Lightband. He returned to Nelson in 1853.

After two cattle drovers found gold in the hills behind Parapara in October 1856, Lightband and William Hough did some further prospecting at the original claim. After a week, they moved further up the valley. By February 1857, they found a location that gave good returns. That month, Lightband Jr. chaired a meeting in Nelson where rules were agreed on for gold fields; these were adopted for all subsequent gold fields in the country. The gully where the first gold was found was named Lightband Gully after him.

Lightband remained interested in mining and went to various gold fields in New Zealand. In circa 1863, he was appointed mining warden for the Grey mining district. He was held in high regards and when he left Greymouth, he was given 100 sovereigns. During his West Coast days, he once had to stay in the camp of the Burgess-Kelly Gang due to the Arnold River having been in flood. Lightband believes that he left there alive because he informed the gang that he was the area's mining warden.

== Other activities ==
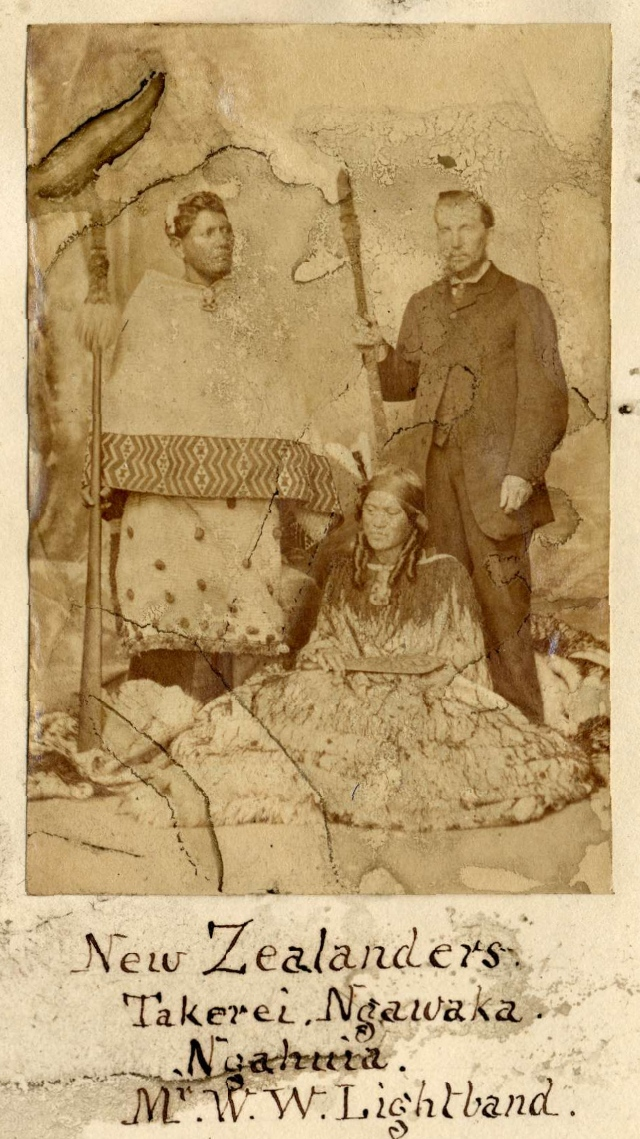
Lightband (right) with rangatira Takerei Ngawaka and Ngawaka's wife, Ngahuia, while in England in 1863 or 1864

In 1863 and 1864, Lightband was accompanying a party of entrepreneurs who travelled to England with a number of Māori chiefs and some of their families. One of his roles was to act as interpreter. They had an audience with Queen Victoria.

For the last 30 years of his life, Lightband lived at Brightwater. At first, he continued in the tannery business, drawing water from the Wairoa River. Gradually, he established fruit orchards and eventually, he gave up on tannery. He was appointed justice of the peace in 1863 and appointed as magistrate in 1866.

== Family and death ==
On 30 June 1859, Lightband married Rebecca Brent at Nelson. She was the daughter of William Brent, a builder. They were to have eight sons.

Lightband and his 16-year-old grandnephew Harry Jackson—a grandson of his sister—left Nelson by canoe for Moturoa / Rabbit Island on 4 May 1909 across the Tasman Bay. As reported on 8 May, concerns arose when the body of their dog was washed up on a Nelson beach some time later. At the council's 14 May 1909 meeting, Jesse Piper as mayor of Nelson, moved that a letter of condolence be sent to the Lightband family. Later in May, the canoe in which the party had set off washed ashore at Farewell Spit. Lightband's body was found on the beach of Rabbit Island on 9 July, some two months after the drowning, and the remains were interred at Wakapuaka Cemetery.
