= Clark River =

River in Tasman District, New Zealand

- Route of the Clark River
- Mouth of the Clark River Clark River (South Island)

Location
- Country: New Zealand

Physical characteristics
- Source
  - location: Adelaide Tarn
  - coordinates: 40°56′28″S 172°32′39″E
- Mouth
  - location: Aorere River
  - coordinates: 40°51′17″S 172°27′50″E
- Length: 15 km (9.3 mi)

Basin features
- Progression: Clark River → Aorere River → Ruataniwha Inlet → Golden Bay / Mohua → Tasman Sea

The Clark River is a river of northwestern South Island of New Zealand. The river flows northwest from its source in the Kahurangi National Park to reach the Aorere River at the foot of the Wakamarama Range 30 kilometres (19 mi) from the Aorere's outflow into Golden Bay.

== See also ==
- List of rivers of New Zealand
