= Spey River (Tasman) =

River in New Zealand

- Route of the Spey River
- Mouth of the Spey River Spey River (Tasman) (South Island)

Location
- Country: New Zealand

Physical characteristics
- Source
  - location: Lake Aorere
  - coordinates: 41°03′26″S 172°20′05″E
  - elevation: 1,030 metres (3,380 ft)
- Mouth
  - location: Aorere River
  - coordinates: 40°59′53″S 172°25′26″E
  - elevation: 380 metres (1,250 ft)
- Length: 11.5 kilometres (7.1 mi)

Basin features
- Progression: Spey River → Aorere River → Ruataniwha Inlet → Tasman Sea
- Tributaries
  - left: Taheke Stream

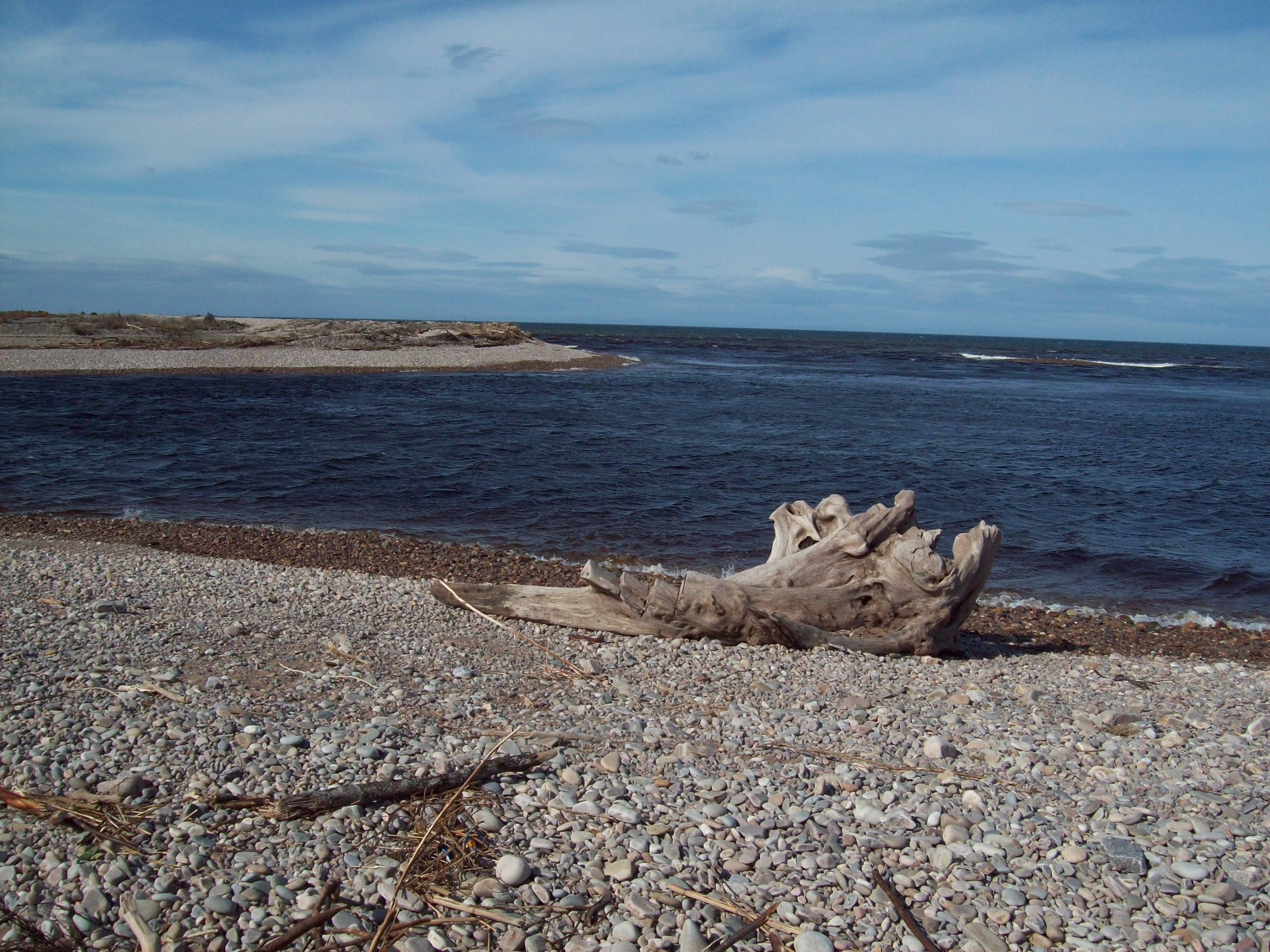
Mouth of the Spey Bay

The Spey River is a river in the Tasman Mountains in the northwest of the South Island of New Zealand. The river drains Lake Aorere near the Aorere Saddle, and is fed by numerous small streams draining the Gouland Range on the west and part of the Domett Range (which the river bisects) on the east. It flows north then east before joining the upper reaches of the Aorere River.
