= Little Boulder River =

River in Tasman District, New Zealand

- Route of the Little Boulder River
- Mouth of the Little Boulder River Little Boulder River (South Island)

Location
- Country: New Zealand

Physical characteristics
- Source
  - location: Lookout Knob
  - coordinates: 40°49′09″S 172°35′36″E
  - elevation: 535 metres (1,755 ft)
- Mouth
  - location: Aorere River
  - coordinates: 40°46′00″S 172°35′50″E

Basin features
- Progression: Little Boulder River → Aorere River → Ruataniwha Inlet → Golden Bay / Mohua → Tasman Sea
- Tributaries
  - left: Bert Creek, Graham Creek

The Little Boulder River is a river in the Tasman Region of New Zealand's South Island.

The Boulder Lake Track follows The Castles ridge, while the Little Boulder River originates near Lookout Knob, north of the ridge. It flows from its sources within Kahurangi National Park to the Aorere River, located southwest of Collingwood.

== See also ==
- List of rivers of New Zealand
