= Appo Hocton =

Servant, landlord, carter, farmer (c. 1819 – 1920)

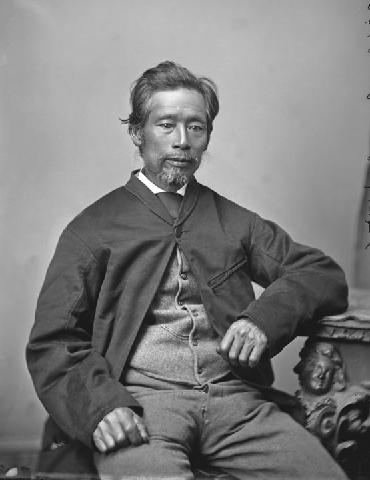
Appo Hocton in November 1876

Appo Hocton (c. 1819 – 26 September 1920), with a birth name of Wong Ahpoo Hock Ting or Wong Ah Poo Hock Ting, his Chinese name was 黃鶴庭， was a Chinese-born New Zealand servant, landlord, carter and farmer. Born in about 1819, or as late as 1823, he was the first recorded Chinese emigrant to New Zealand, arriving in Nelson on the Thomas Harrison on 25 October 1842.

Hocton purchased land in Nelson's Washington Valley, where he built eight cottages, four of which still exist today; they are located at 40 Washington Road, and nearby at 16, 38, and 40 Hastings Street.

In 1876 Appo Hocton moved to Dovedale, Tasman onto a 485-acre block of land near Brandy Creek, after clearing the land Appo farmed cattle and sheep. On the 12 June 1879, he lost his son, Albert Ah Lina Hocton, to an accidental homicide by his other son, Appo Lewis Hocton. His wife, Ellen, died at 89 years old near the 21 December 1916. His eldest son, William Rowling, died on the 31 January 1919. Appo himself died on the 26 September 1920 at the purported age of 97, although obituaries from the time claim that he had recently celebrated his 100th birthday. He was buried at Dovedale Cemetery although some believe he was buried behind his home at Dovedale.
