= Whanganui Inlet =

Natural harbour in Tasman District, New Zealand

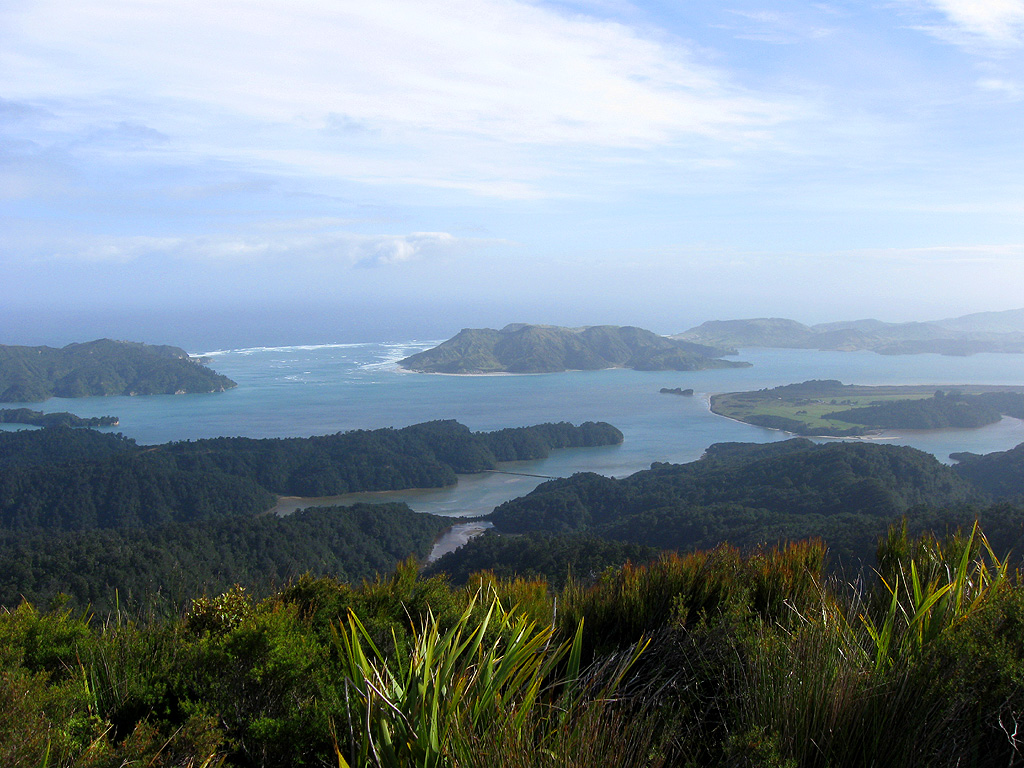
- Whanganui Inlet from Knuckle Hill

- Location within New Zealand
- Location: Tasman District
- Nearest city: Nelson
- Coordinates: 40°36′S 172°33′E

Whanganui Inlet, commonly known by its former name Westhaven Inlet or West Haven, is a large natural indentation in the northwest coast of the South Island of New Zealand.

The inlet is a drowned river valley running parallel to the west coast. It is some 13 kilometres (8.1 mi) in length and on average is about 2.5 kilometres (1.6 mi) wide. A narrow channel halfway along the valley connects the inlet to the Tasman Sea. This channel is located 19 kilometres (12 mi) southwest of Farewell Spit.

It is still in a largely unspoilt natural state, with seagrass and salt marsh providing an environment friendly to sea life. It is a popular site for fishing and boating, and much of the inlet is protected by a wildlife management area and by the Westhaven Marine Reserve. 42 species of water bird have been seen in the Inlet, including South Island oyster catcher, bar-tailed godwit, knot, banded dotterel and banded rail.

In 1846 it was reported that ships of up to 80 tons could cross the bar and that one had taken a cargo of coal away from outcrops on islands at the south end of the harbour. Logging continued until at least 1952, there was a flax mill and gold was mined. In 1908 the town of Rakopi was established opposite the entrance, with a telegraph office, sawmill, wharf, school and houses. Declining resources, an economic downturn and the dangerous passage for ships through the entrance caused its decline. The Benara Timber Co and Westhaven Coal Co were still operating at the south end of the Inlet in 1941.
