= William Nation =

William Charles Nation (18 February 1840 – 29 May 1930) was a New Zealand printer, journalist, newspaper proprietor, spiritualist and tree planter.

== Early life ==
Nation was born in Sydney, Australia, and moved with his family to Nelson, New Zealand, in 1857. His father, also Wiliam Nation, was a printer and established The Colonist newspaper.

During the Otago gold rush he spent time working in printers for Dunedin and Lyttleton, but settled back in Nelson. He married Sarah Ann Webley on 12 August 1864, and together they had six daughters and two sons.

== Career ==
Nation was the printer with the Press for 12 years from 1864, and also spent time working at The Wellington Independent and The New Zealand Times.

In 1881 he purchased The Wairarapa Standard from Richard Wakelin and moved to Greytown. Nation sold the Standard in 1893 and moved to Shannon to publish The Manawatu Famer and Horowhenua Country Chronicle. Nation then moved to Levin in 1896 in order to compete for and take over another newspaper.

Nation was an early advocate for tree planting, and introduced the first Arbour Day in New Zealand in July 1890 in Greytown.

== Spiritualism ==
While living in Greytown, Nation developed an interest in spiritualism. This interest started when his daughter, Bertha, seemed to develop the ability to move small pieces of furniture around the room in March 1883. A spirit circle was developed at the Nation household, let by a "Mrs. C.", with another Nation daughter, Bella, also becoming a medium for the circle. The circle had support from local Māori participants including Hamuera Tamahau Mahupuku and Te Mānihera Te Rangi-taka-i-waho.

Nation founded More Light, a spiritualist newspaper in June 1887, and another spiritualist paper Message of Life in 1903 after his move to Levin.

Nation served as the president of the National Council of the Spiritualist Church for 13 years, and joined the Spiritualist Church of New Zealand.

== Later life ==
Nation sold his last newspaper in 1909, and continued to work as a births, deaths, and marriages registrar in Shannon. He also served for 17 years as coroner in Levin.

He died in 1930, and was survived by four of his children.
