= Slate River (New Zealand) =

River in Tasman District, New Zealand

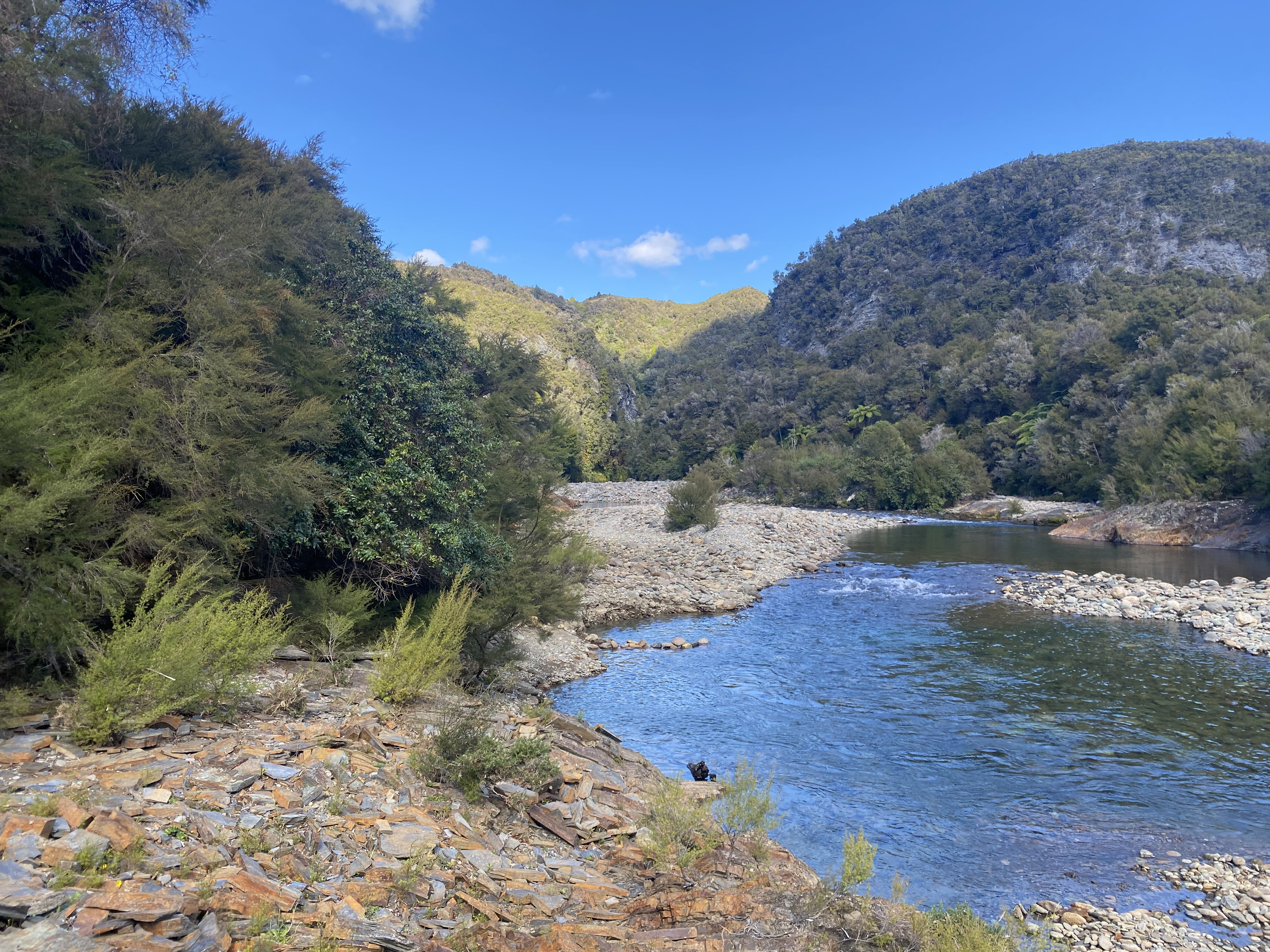
- Route of the Slate River
- Mouth of the Slate River Slate River (New Zealand) (South Island)

Location
- Country: New Zealand

Physical characteristics
- Source
  - location: Slate River Peak
  - coordinates: 40°54′19″S 172°37′15″E
  - elevation: 1,527 metres (5,010 ft)
- Mouth
  - location: Ōtere River
  - coordinates: 40°45′47″S 172°42′36″E

Basin features
- Progression: Slate River → Aorere River → Ruataniwha Inlet → Golden Bay / Mohua → Tasman Sea
- Tributaries
  - left: Serpentine Creek, Whitehorn Creek, Kill Devil Creek, Snow River, Rocky River
  - right: Fletcher Creek

The Slate River is located in the northwest of the South Island of New Zealand. It is a tributary of the Aorere River. It was a major source of gold during the Aorere gold rush. Slateford, a former gold mining town, was the main settlement during the rush in the 19th century. It was located on the true right of the Slate River, just above its confluence with the Aorere River. From the Aorere River to Moonlight Flat, the Slate River forms the boundary between Kahurangi National Park and the Aorere Goldfields conservation area.
