= Pākawau =

Settlement in New Zealand

- Locality
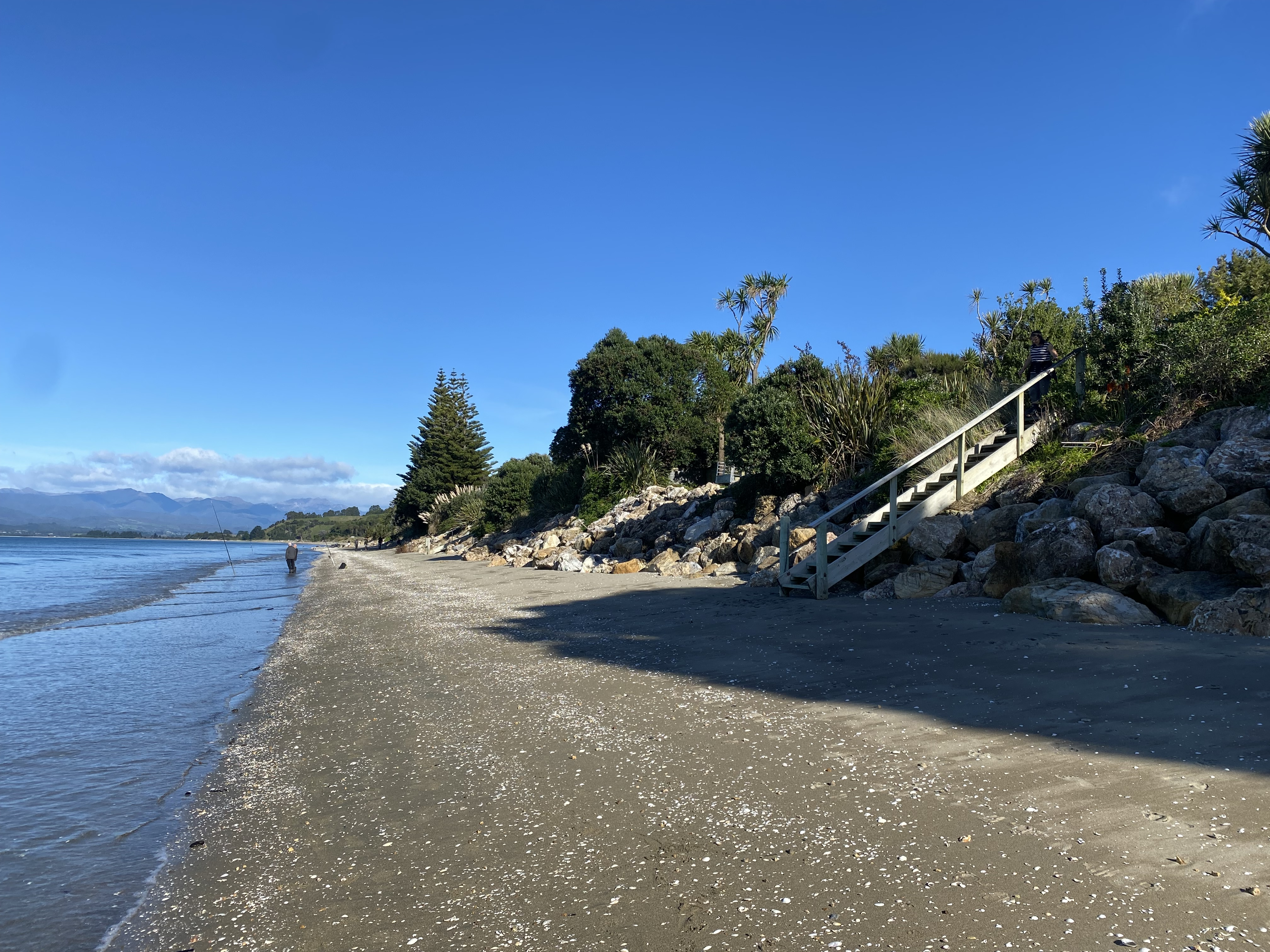
- Beach at Pākawau
- Interactive map of Pākawau
- Coordinates: 40°35′49″S 172°41′17″E
- Country: New Zealand
- Territorial authority: Tasman
- Ward: Golden Bay
- Electorates: West Coast-Tasman; Te Tai Tonga (Māori)

Government
  - Territorial authority: Tasman District Council
  - Mayor of Tasman: Tim King
  - West Coast-Tasman MP: Maureen Pugh
  - Te Tai Tonga MP: Tākuta Ferris

Area
  - Total: 108.05 km^{2} (41.72 sq mi)

Population (2023 census)
  - Total: 222
  - Density: 2.05/km^{2} (5.32/sq mi)
- Time zone: UTC+12 (NZST)
  - Summer (DST): UTC+13 (NZDT)
- Area code: 03

Pākawau is a small coastal settlement located in Golden Bay / Mohua close to the northernmost tip of the South Island of New Zealand, between Collingwood and Pūponga.

== Toponymy ==
The name derives from the Māori name for the small creek in this location and was also the name of a local pā. The name is a combination of pā, meaning home, colony or flock, and kawau – the black shag.

== History ==
Prior to European settlement, the owners of the land at Pākawau were Te Atiawa o Te Waka-a-Māui, a Māori iwi (tribe) in the upper South Island. Its rohe (tribal area) extends from Golden Bay and Marlborough Sounds to Cape Campbell, St Arnaud and Westport. Pākawau is one of the places of cultural significance to the iwi in the coastal and marine area in their rohe.

In 1842 the New Zealand Company sought to expand from its existing Nelson settlement into Golden Bay, and began surveying in the area in October 1842. Settlers from Nelson seeking to prospect the coal and lime deposits in Golden Bay faced some resistance from local Māori. From 1851 to 1852, the Crown sought to purchase 39,000 ha (96,000 acres) of land at Pākawau because of the presence of coal in the area, but before Māori became fully aware of the mineral value. A sale was agreed on 15 May 1852, for a price of £550, representing only the agricultural value of the land.

Coal was extracted from seams at Pākawau as early as the 1840s. The geologist Ferdinand von Hochstetter visited the Pākawau settlement and coal fields in August 1859 as part of an exploration of the western districts of the Nelson Province with Julius von Haast. Hochstetter was shown around the coal workings and noted that the coal appeared to be of a premium quality, and superior to any other coal known at the time in New Zealand. The coal seams are from the Late Cretaceous to Early Tertiary periods. The coal was found in thin seams of up to 1.2 m (3 ft 11 in) thickness, with shale in between. While the coal measures were believed to extend over a large area, the thin seams and shale partings had contributed to lack of success of previous mining attempts. In a published lecture on the Geology of the Province of Nelson, von Hochstetter described the coal discovered on the banks of the Pākawau Stream as being good for steam-raising purposes.

Mining of graphite (then referred to as plumbago) began in 1857, and was still operating in 1873.

The New Zealand government geologist Alexander McKay reported on the coal measures at Pākawau in 1900. Also in that year, commercial operation of a coal mine began, with coal carried by tramline down to the shoreline and a jetty out into the tide channel offshore for shipment.

Paintworks operated at Pākawau in the early part of the 20th century.

As part of the Te Ātiawa o Te Waka-a-Māui Deed of Settlement agreed with the Crown in 2012, the ownership of Pākawau Inlet was vested in Te Ātiawa, with a conservation covenant agreed between the Te Ātiawa o Te Waka-a-Māui Trust and the Minister of Conservation.

== Demographics ==
Pākawau locality covers 108.05 km^{2} (41.72 sq mi). It is part of the larger Golden Bay / Mohua statistical area.

Historical population
Year	Pop.	±% p.a.
2006	162	—
2013	174	+1.03%
2018	192	+1.99%
2023	222	+2.95%

Pākawau had a population of 222 in the 2023 New Zealand census, an increase of 30 people (15.6%) since the 2018 census, and an increase of 48 people (27.6%) since the 2013 census. There were 111 males and 108 females in 108 dwellings. 2.7% of people identified as LGBTIQ+. There were 33 people (14.9%) aged under 15 years, 21 (9.5%) aged 15 to 29, 99 (44.6%) aged 30 to 64, and 72 (32.4%) aged 65 or older.

People could identify as more than one ethnicity. The results were 91.9% European (Pākehā); 8.1% Māori; 5.4% Pasifika; 1.4% Asian; 1.4% Middle Eastern, Latin American and African New Zealanders (MELAA); and 8.1% other, which includes people giving their ethnicity as "New Zealander". English was spoken by 98.6%, Māori by 1.4%, and other languages by 12.2%. No language could be spoken by 2.7% (e.g. too young to talk). The percentage of people born overseas was 14.9, compared with 28.8% nationally.

Religious affiliations were 28.4% Christian, 1.4% Hindu, and 1.4% New Age. People who answered that they had no religion were 59.5%, and 9.5% of people did not answer the census question.

Of those at least 15 years old, 42 (22.2%) people had a bachelor's or higher degree, 102 (54.0%) had a post-high school certificate or diploma, and 48 (25.4%) people exclusively held high school qualifications. 12 people (6.3%) earned over $100,000 compared to 12.1% nationally. The employment status of those at least 15 was 69 (36.5%) full-time, 27 (14.3%) part-time, and 3 (1.6%) unemployed.

== Geography ==
The settlement is located along the coastline of Golden Bay / Mohua between Collingwood and Pūponga, with Kahurangi National Park to the west. The beach shoreline adjacent to some parts of the settlement is prone to erosion.

The area of shallow water close to Pākawau has been the location of many herd strandings of long-finned pilot whales. Golden Bay has been described as a 'whale trap', because of its protruding coastlines and long, gently sloping beaches. In a report on their visit to Golden Bay in 1846, Charles Heaphy and Thomas Brunner described the coastal area at Taupata Point to the north of Pākawau as strewn with whale bones resulting from mass strandings. More recently, whale strandings occurred near Pākawau in January 2025.

== Pākawau School ==
In 1864, a one-hectare (2.5-acre) section of land on the north side of Pākawau Stream was set aside for educational purposes, and allocated to the Nelson Central Board of Education. By 1873, local residents had cleared the bush-covered section, and built a school house. By June of that year, funding to subsidise the cost of employing a school master had been obtained from the Education Board, and the school opened with 10 pupils. Low attendance led to the withdrawal of funding and the school closed for four years from 1874. The passing of the Education Act 1877 led to free and compulsory schooling for children. The Education Board agreed to provide renewed funding of a subsidy for Pākawau School in July 1878, and by the end of that year, 21 pupils were attending. By 1885, a new school building had been constructed, and the original school converted into a teacher's house. In 1914, the school was moved to a new site, with the building cut into four sections for transport.

Puponga School (1905 to 1941) and Rakopi School (1912 to 1938) merged with Pākawau School. A major redevelopment of the school buildings was undertaken in 1953, with the official opening held on 9 September 1953.

The school closed in 1981.

== Camping ground ==
The settlement is known as the location of a popular camping ground.

== Sources cited ==
- Johnston, Mike; Nolden, Sascha (2011). Travels of Hochstetter and Haast in New Zealand, 1858–1860. Nelson: Nikau Press. ISBN 978-0-9582898-3-2. Wikidata Q134207310.
