= Aorere River =

River in New Zealand

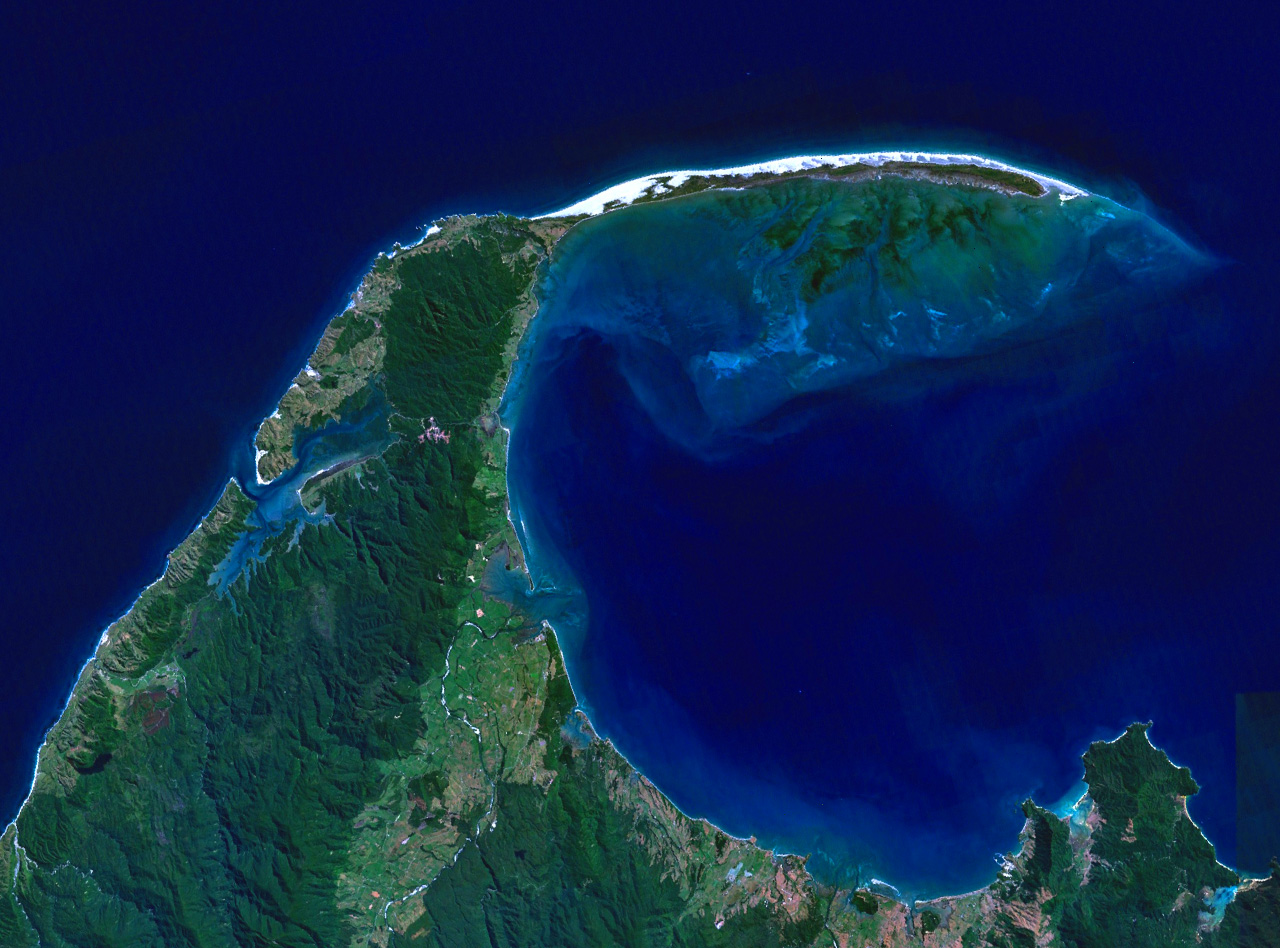
- The fertile plains around the lower Aorere lie in the lower left of this satellite view, which shows the river's outflow into Golden Bay
- Route of the Aorere River
- Mouth of the Aorere River Aorere River (South Island)

Location
- Country: New Zealand
- District: Tasman

Physical characteristics
- Source
  - location: Domett Range
  - coordinates: 41°01′37″S 172°25′16″E
- Mouth
  - location: Ruataniwha Inlet
  - coordinates: 40°40′35″S 172°40′00″E
- Length: 40 km (25 mi)
- Basin size: 573 km^{2} (221 mi^{2})

Basin features
- Progression: Aorere River → Ruataniwha Inlet → Golden Bay / Mohua → Tasman Sea
- Tributaries
  - left: Spey, Kaituna
  - right: Clark, Boulder, Little Boulder, Slate, Little Slate, Snow
- Waterfalls: Salisbury Falls

The Aorere River is in the Tasman District of the South Island of New Zealand that flows from headwaters in the alpine regions of the Kahurangi National Park. It has a catchment area of 573 km^{2} (221 sq mi), representing around 11% of the total area of Kahurangi National Park. The river flows generally northwards for 40 km (25 mi) before draining into Golden Bay at the town of Collingwood. The Heaphy Track's northeastern end is in the upper valley of the Aorere.

Tributaries of the Aorere include the Spey, Boulder, and Slate Rivers.

The heaviest storm in 150 years hit the area on 28 December 2010. Two bridges were swept away, including the historic and recently restored Salisbury Swing Bridge.

== Gallery ==
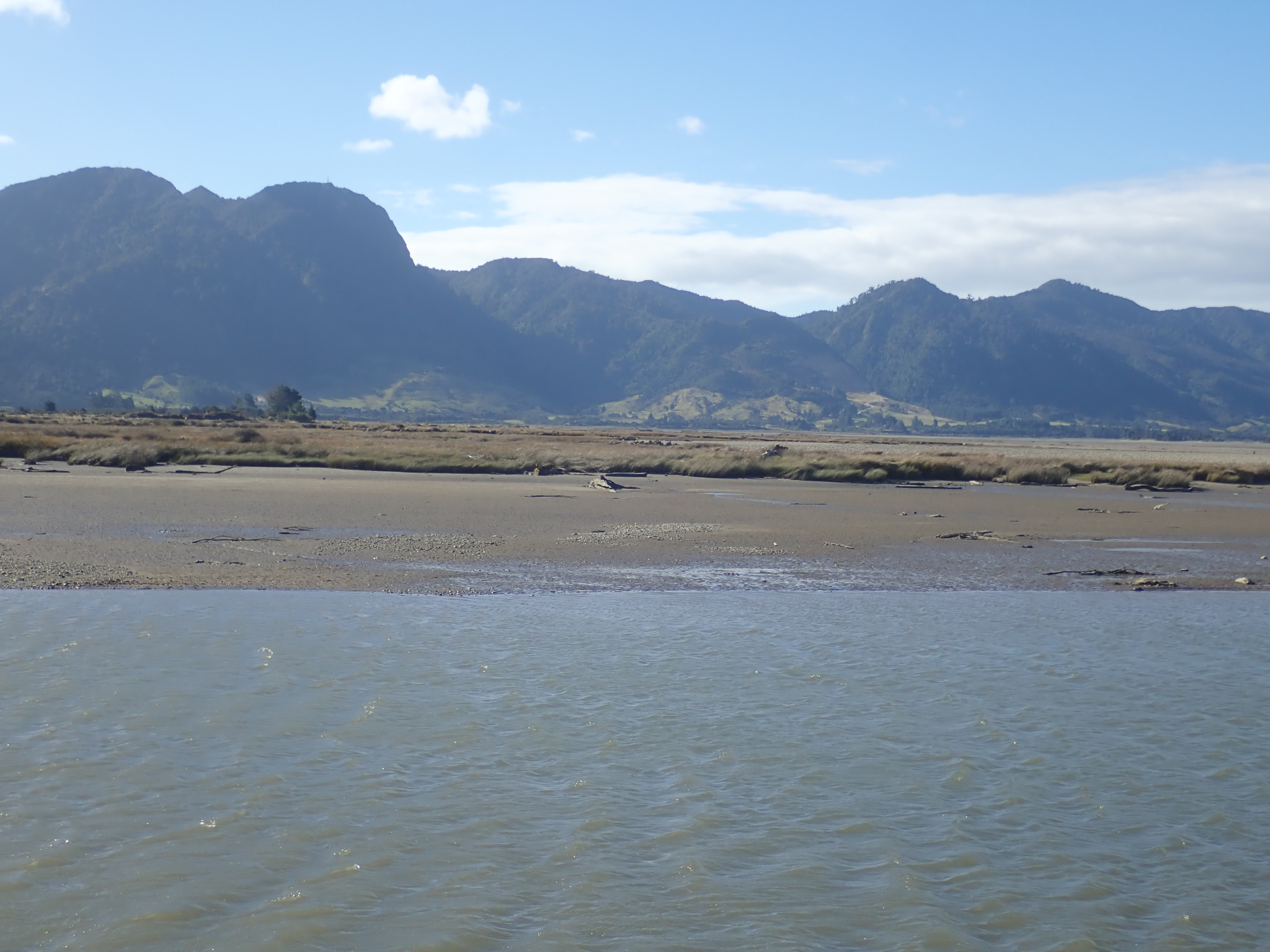

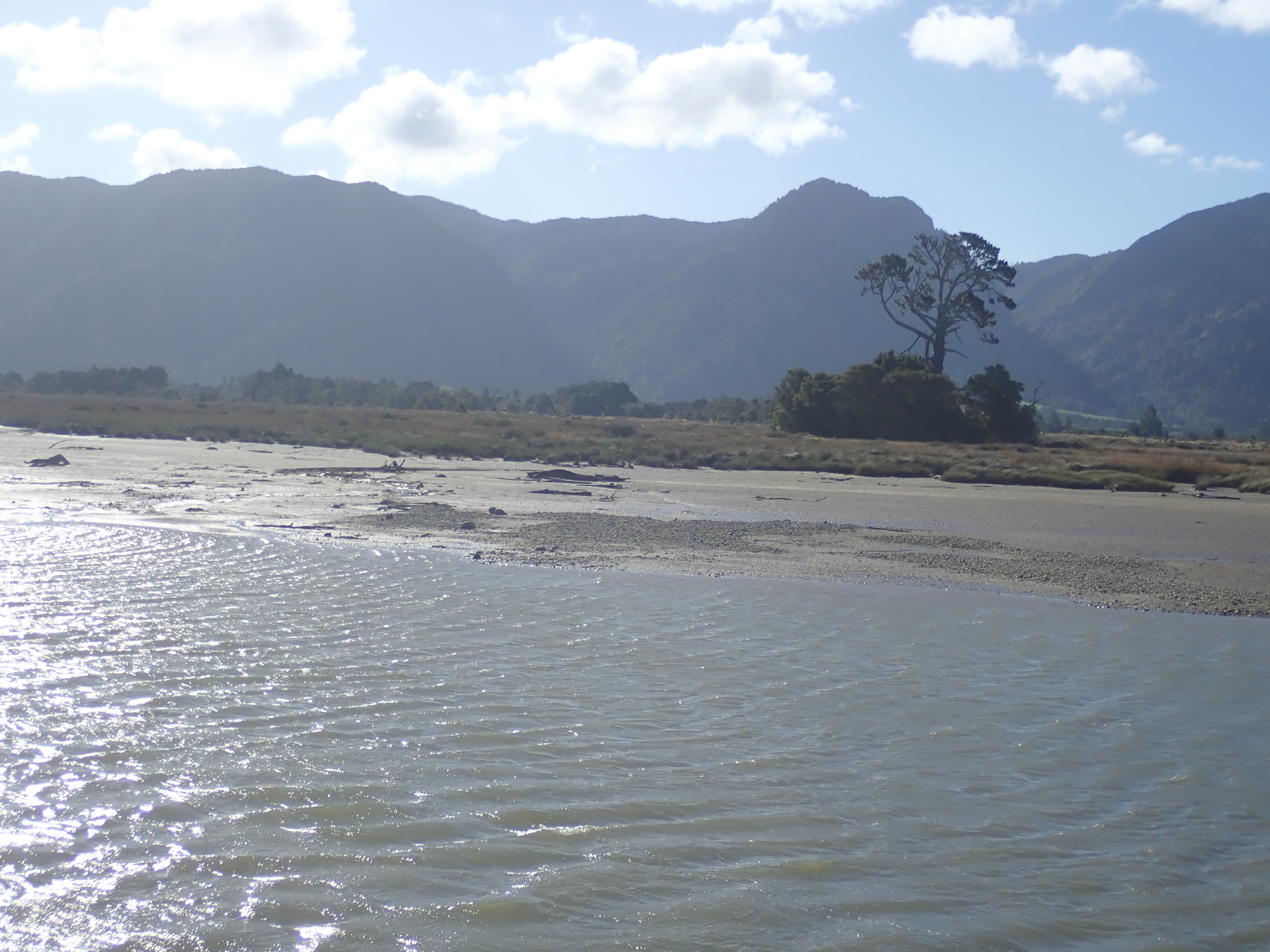
