= Wharariki Ecosanctuary =

Predator-proof sanctuary in New Zealand

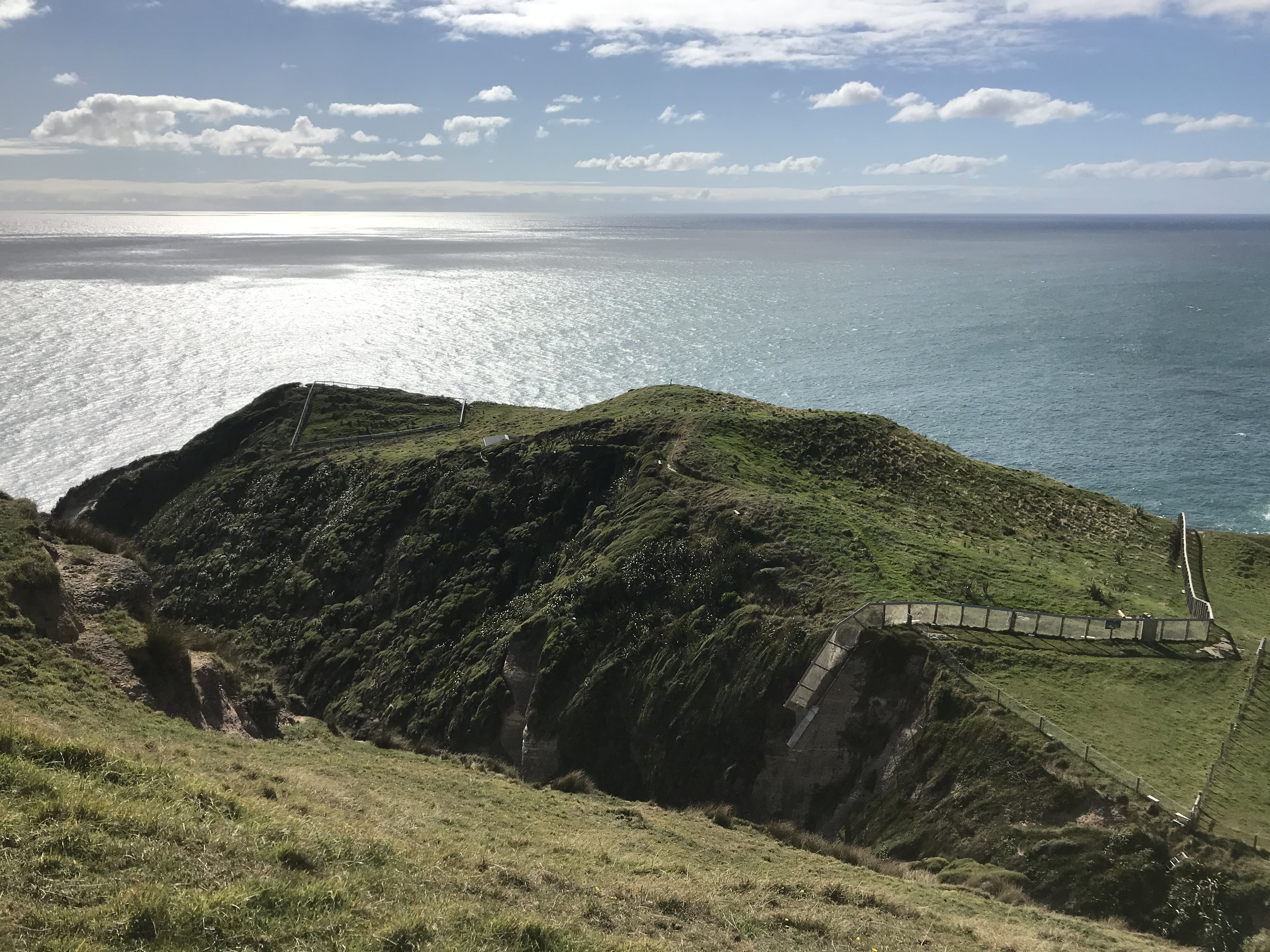
- Interactive map of Wharariki Ecosanctuary
- Nearest city: Collingwood
- Coordinates: 40°29′57″S 172°41′44″E
- Area: 2.5 ha (6.2 acres)
- Established: January 2020
- Operator: Farewell Wharariki HealthPost Nature Trust

Wharariki Ecosanctuary is a wildlife sanctuary within a pest-exclusion fence at Cape Farewell, New Zealand.

== Location ==
The Wharariki Ecosanctuary is located on a headland on the Wharariki coastline at Cape Farewell. It is sited on conservation land that is managed as the Puponga Farm Park.

== Establishment ==
The project was initiated by Peter Butler, who created a trust in 2017 to protect local wildlife in the region from Wharariki Beach to the tip of Farewell Spit. The Farewell Wharariki HealthPost Nature Trust was registered as a Charitable Trust in May 2021.

The sanctuary has been created in a collaboration between the Collingwood-based HealthPost Nature Trust, the Department of Conservation and Manawhenua ki Mōhua, representing Ngāti Tama, Te Ātiawa and Ngāti Rārua in the Golden Bay/ Mohua area. Starting in September 2019, a 200 metres (660 ft) pest-exclusion fence was constructed above the cliffs at Wharariki, enclosing 2.5 ha (6.2 acres). The fence was completed in January 2020, and the sanctuary was officially opened by Eugenie Sage (Minister of Conservation), along with local iwi, and the sanctuary patron, broadcaster Kim Hill.

Prior to the translocation of burrow-nesting seabirds, the area was prepared by building artificial burrows, trapping pests and planting around the site.

In the Sustainable Business Awards 2021, HealthPost received a commendation in the Restoring Nature Award category, for their work in developing the ecosanctuary.

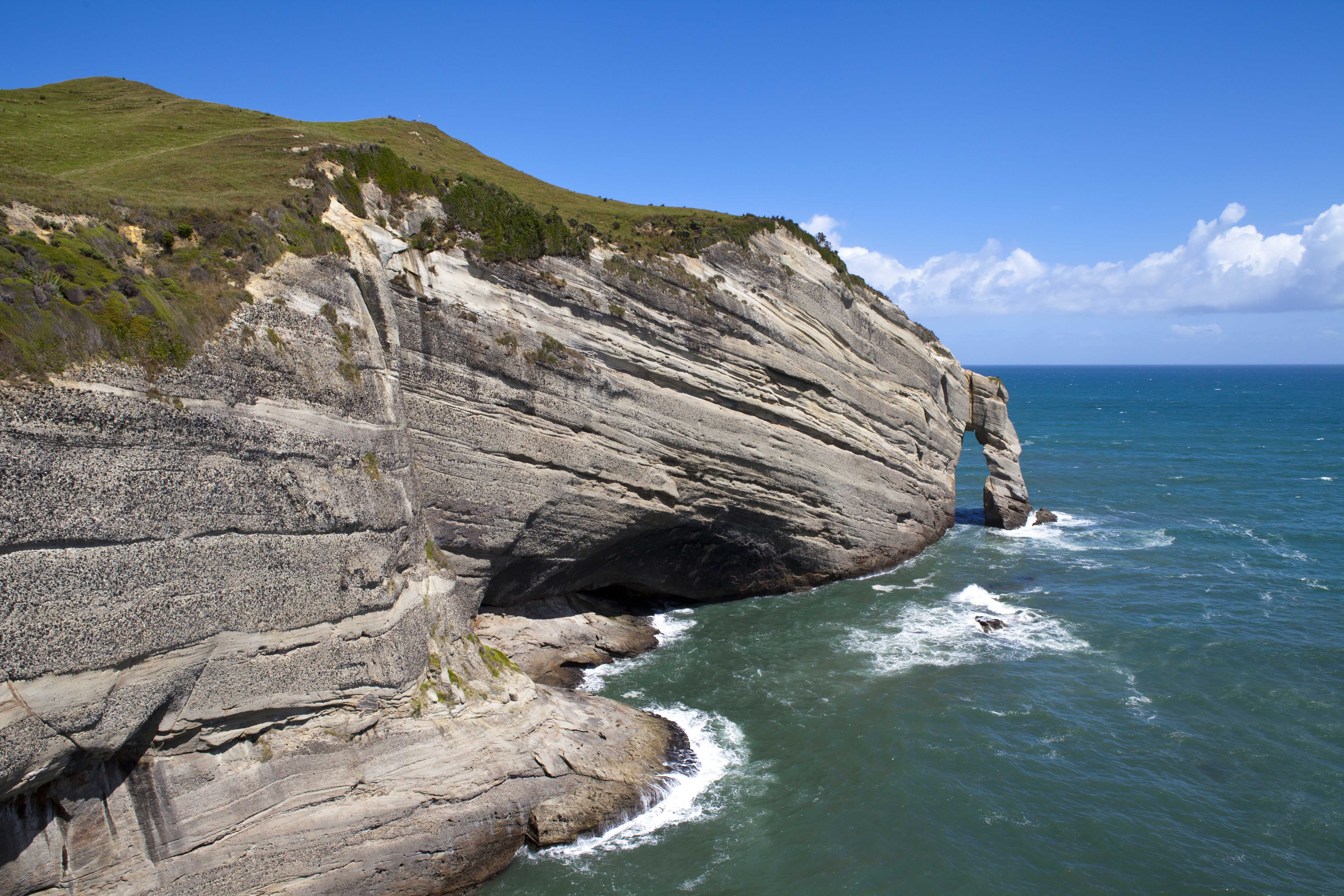
Cape Farewell prior to the establishment of the ecosanctuary

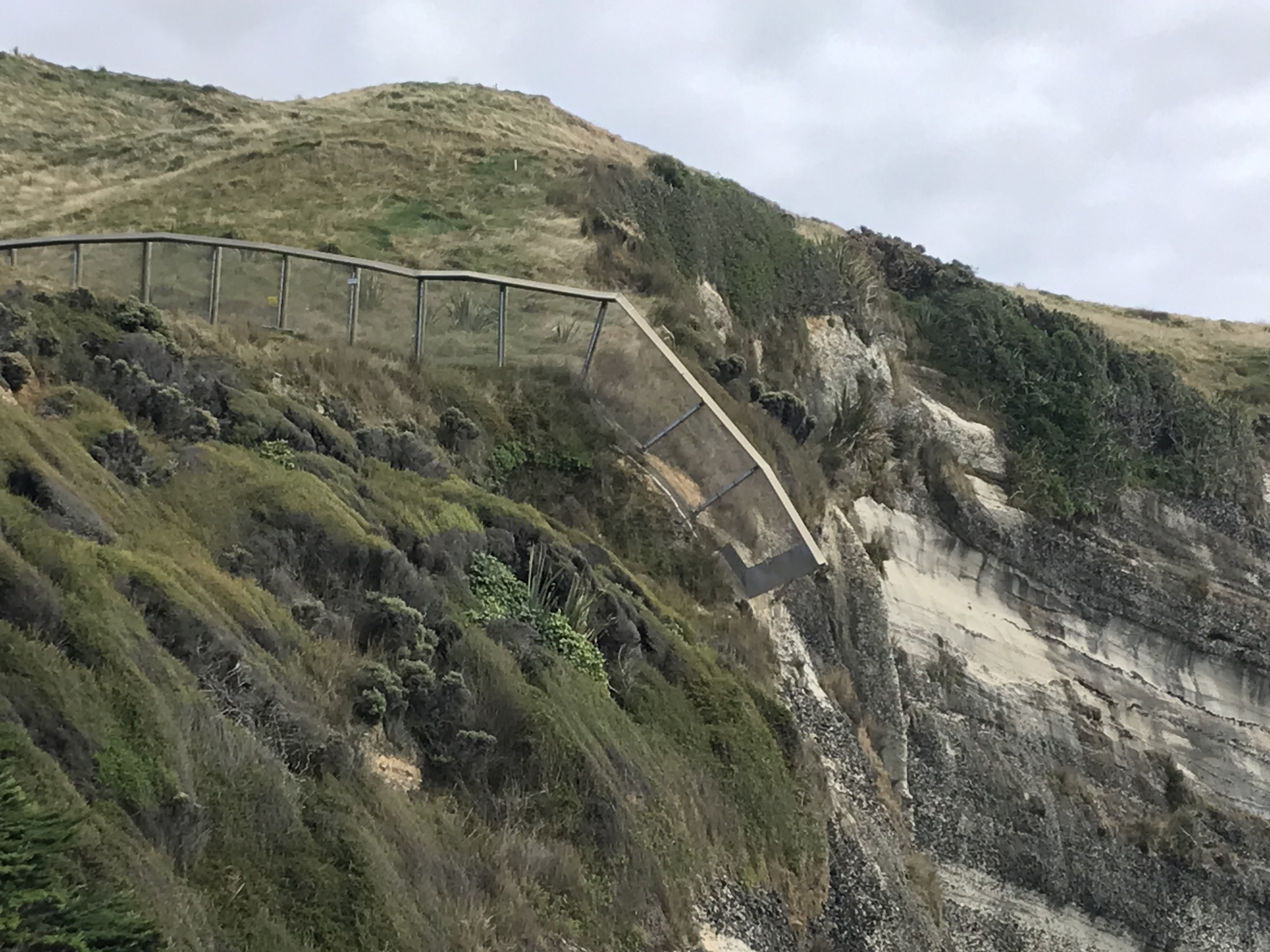
After the ecosanctuary's pest-exclusion fence was built

== Revegetation ==
By 2021, around 3000 trees had been planted in the sanctuary and around the Wharariki wetland. Species planted include kanuka, kaikomako and ti kouka (cabbage tree).

== Translocation of fluttering shearwaters ==
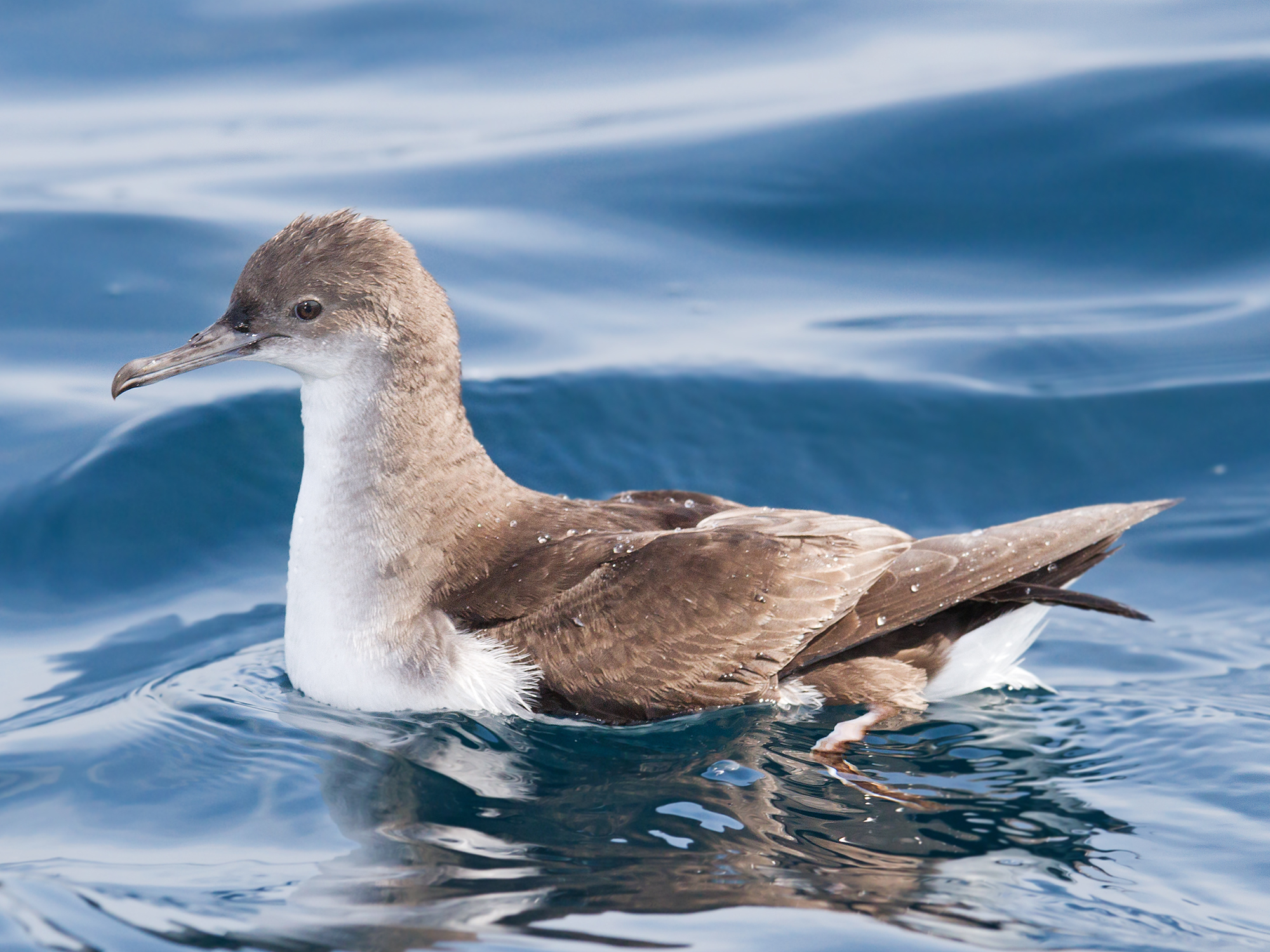
Fluttering shearwater (Puffinus gavia)

In January 2022, 50 fluttering shearwater (Puffinus gavia) or pakahā chicks were translocated from the Long Island – Kokomohua Marine Reserve in Queen Charlotte Sound to the Wharariki Ecosanctuary. They were the first species to be introduced to the fenced sanctuary.

In January 2023, another 56 fluttering shearwater chicks were translocated from the Long Island – Kokomohua Marine Reserve to the Wharariki Ecosanctuary. They were transferred due to weather events impacting their burrows on Long Island. It is hoped they will establish a breeding colony. One of the group of volunteers assisting with the relocation was teenage environmentalist Nate Wilbourne.

A third translocation of chicks to the sanctuary was undertaken in January 2024, with 92 chicks moved from Long Island – Kokomohua.

In September 2025, the first fluttering shearwater named Yonga, returned to the Wharariki Ecosanctuary after first being translocated in January 2022. In November 2025, the first chick to be raised naturally in the sanctuary area hatched in a monitored burrow. The chick fledged successfully.
