= Nate Wilbourne =

New Zealand activist (born 2008)

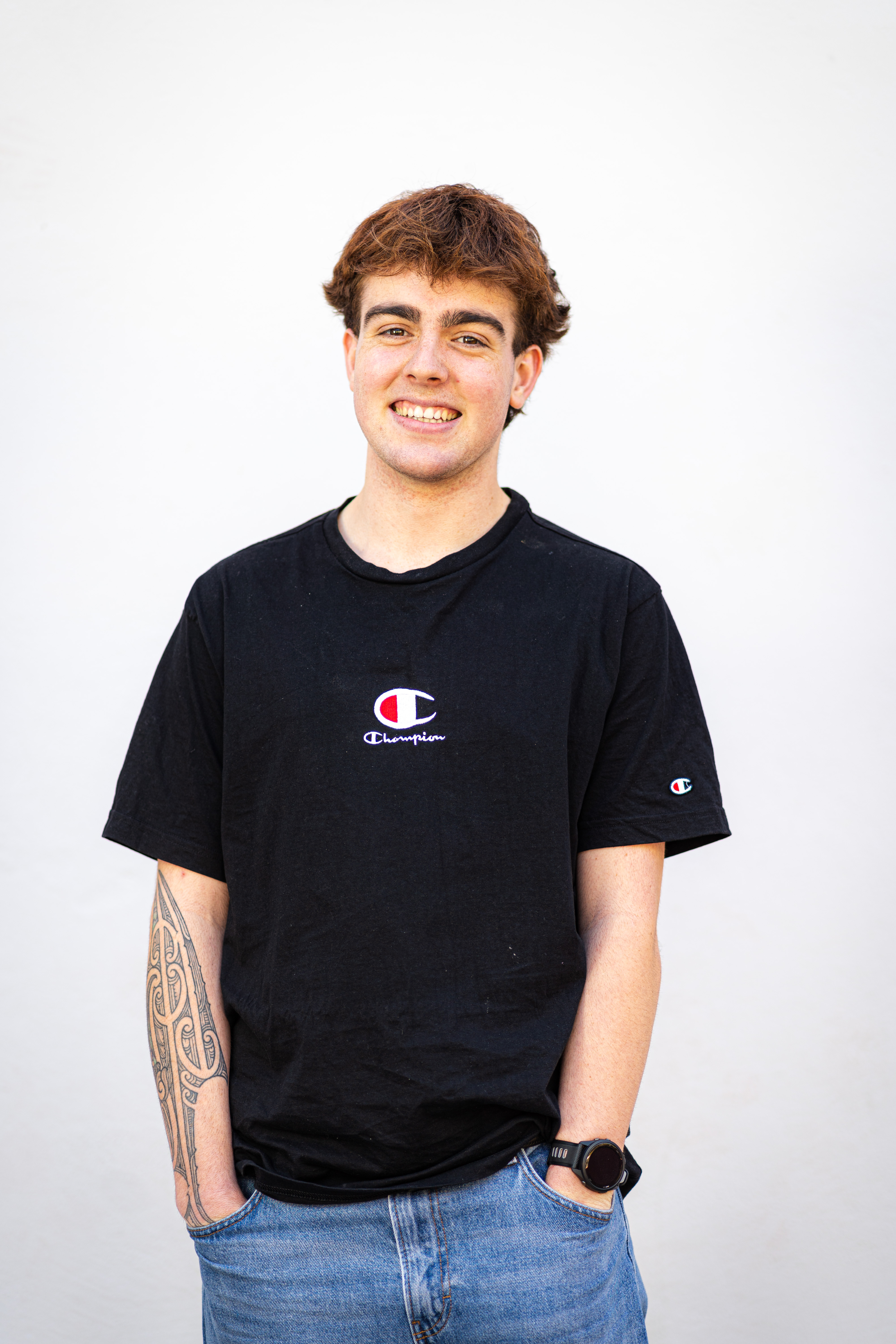
- Wilbourne in 2025
- Born: 17 March 2008 (age 18); Nelson, New Zealand
- Education: Garin College
- Occupations: Environmentalist, Public Speaker, Political Commentator
- Known for: Environmental and Youth Advocacy
- Website: www.natewilbourne.com

Nate Wilbourne (born 17 March 2008) is a New Zealand youth advocate and environmentalist. He works on youth and environmental advocacy and policy across New Zealand, Europe, and parts of Asia.

He was a semi-finalist for the 2025 and 2026 Young New Zealander of the Year award and is a part of Forbes 30 Under 30 Asia, Class of 2026. He is the Future Generations Lead at the Wellbeing Economy Alliance Aotearoa, leading the campaign for a Future Generations Act.

== Biography ==
Wilbourne was born on 17 March 2008 and lives in Nelson. He grew up in the suburb of Brightwater, where he attended the local primary school. When he was 12, he adopted a plant-based diet after learning that farming was responsible for almost half of New Zealand's greenhouse gas emissions.

Wilbourne is the founder of 'Gen-Z Aotearoa', a youth-led advocacy organisation which "use[s] the power of social media to drive positive change."

He is a member of the New Zealand Labour Party, and was selected to be Hon. Damien O'Connor's Youth MP at the 2025 New Zealand Youth Parliament.

== Education ==
Wilbourne attended Garin College, where he was the Enviroschools Captain. During his studies at Garin College he was awarded a 'Sustainability Champion' scholarship to study a two-year International Baccalaureate (IBDP) program at UWC Robert Bosch College in Germany.

Currently, he is a student at Victoria University Wellington, studying a Bachelor of Arts majoring in Development Studies and International Relations.

== Advocacy and career ==
=== Future Generations Act ===
Wilbourne is the Future Generations Lead at the Wellbeing Economy Alliance Aotearoa, leading the campaign for a Future Generations Act in New Zealand. In 2026, Wilbourne spoke at the 10th Vatican Youth Symposium, held at the Casina Pio IV in Vatican City, outlining the Future Generations Act campaign.

=== Conservation work ===
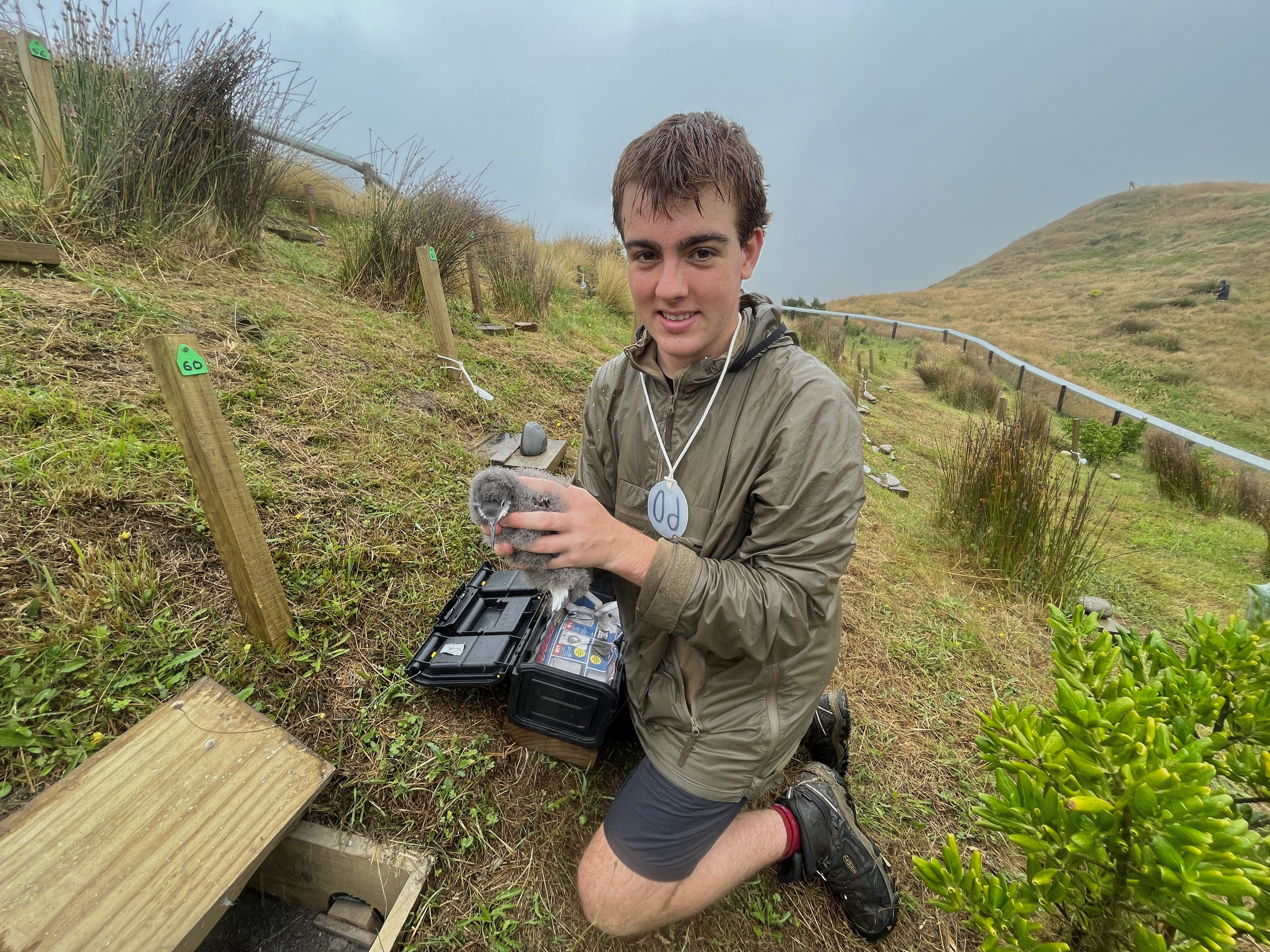
Nate Wilbourne helping with the translocation of fluttering shearwater to the Wharariki Ecosanctuary

At 13 years old, Wilbourne became involved with Forest & Bird, and set up a Youth Hub to get young people involved in conservation in his region. He has also volunteered for conservation work in places like Farewell Spit. As of 2026, Wilbourne serves on the board of trustees of Forest & Bird.

In 2023 and 2024, Wilbourne took part in the translocation of 198 fluttering shearwater chicks to the Wharariki Ecosanctuary, a predator-proof fenced sanctuary established by HealthPost Nature Trust at the northern-most point of the South Island. He also participates in projects to boost the number of kororā (little penguins) and tītī (sooty shearwaters) in the area.

In 2024, Wilbourne spoke at the Youth Environmental Education Congress (YEEC) as part of the World Environmental Education Congress (WEEC) in Abu Dhabi, on "Intergenerational Action for Biodiversity".

=== Climate justice activism ===
Wilbourne has worked with School Strike 4 Climate New Zealand. He helped to organise his local climate strike in March 2023, mobilising local students and handing an open letter to Nelson Mayor Nick Smith.

In December 2022, Wilbourne was a panellist for Save the Children New Zealand's youth panel that interviewed Climate Change Minister James Shaw ahead of COP27.

Wilbourne was a speaker at the 2024 LCOY Germany conference, Europe's largest climate summit for young people, hosted in Berlin in October in the lead up to COP29.

=== Political advocacy ===
Wilbourne is an advocate for sustainable urban development in his home city of Nelson, promoting climate resilience through initiatives that integrate Mātauranga Māori, affordable housing, and green spaces. He has also supported expanding cycleway infrastructure to create more sustainable transport options in his community.

On constitutional issues, he has criticised the ACT Party's proposed Treaty Principles Bill, arguing that it seeks to redefine the principles of the Treaty of Waitangi and accusing ACT of exploiting "Pākehā fear and misunderstanding of Te Tiriti". Additionally, he has voiced support for lowering the voting age to 16, contending that doing so would enhance youth political participation.

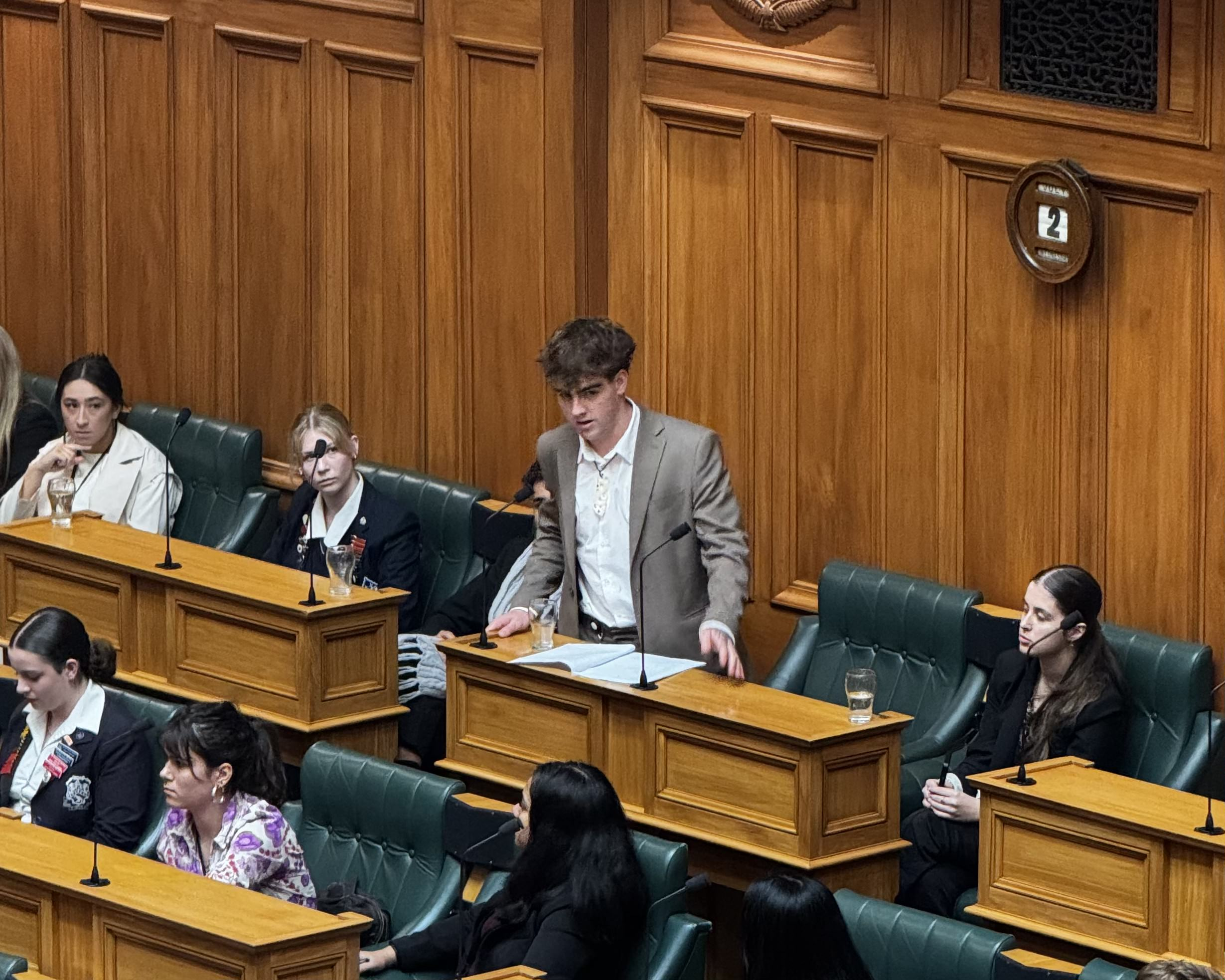
Wilbourne speaking during the 11th New Zealand Youth Parliament

In 2025 Wilbourne was representative in New Zealand's Youth Parliament, advocating for environmental protection and youth political engagement. He delivered a speech criticising the government's environmental policies, which he framed as a "war on nature", while also raising concerns about censorship after youth MPs were instructed to avoid direct criticism of ministers in their speeches.

=== Other work ===
On 16 October 2024, Wilbourne spoke at a World Food Day event in Stuttgart, on the topic of building sustainable food systems from the perspective of young people.

Wilbourne has done youth engagement work with global civil society organisation, The World Future Council, Save the Children NZ, NetSafe and the Make It 16 campaign to lower the voting age.

In March 2026, he spoke at ChangeNOW at the Grand Palais in Paris, following the European Premier of Damon Gameau's Future Council, and at the 'Youth Parliament: Generation Democracy.' In April 2026, he was invited by the President of the United Nations Economic and Social Council to attend the Youth Forum at the United Nations Headquarters in New York.

Wilbourne spoke at the 2026 Athens Democracy Forum in partnership with The New York Times, as a panellist on "Teens Take on Social Media", discussing the role of young people and social media in democracy.

== Awards and recognition ==
- Impact Award 2023 – Climate category semi-finalist
- Keep New Zealand Beautiful 2023 – Young Legend Award
- Te Kaiārahi Rangatahi o te Taiao – Forest & Bird's Youth Award
- 2025 Young New Zealander of the Year – Semi-finalist
- 2026 Young New Zealander of the Year – Semi-finalist
- Forbes 30 Under 30 Asia - Class of 2026, Social Impact
- Raoul Wallenberg Academy - Young Courage Award 2026
