= Long Island-Kokomohua Marine Reserve =

Marine reserve in the Marlborough Region of New Zealand's South Island

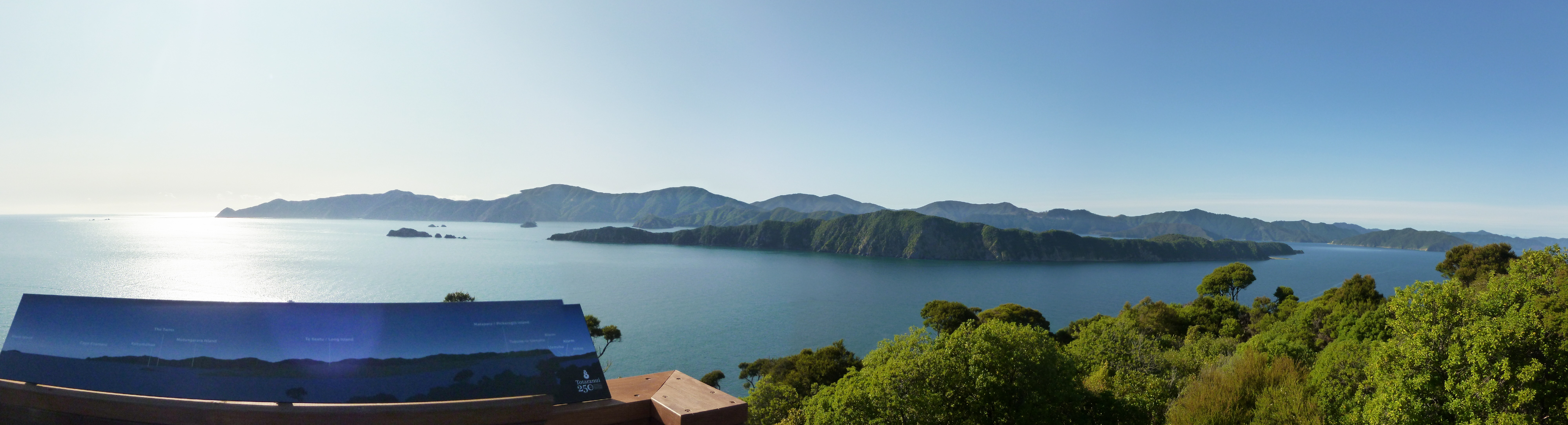
- Long Island, as viewed from Motuara Island

- Location within New Zealand
- Location: Marlborough Region, New Zealand
- Nearest city: Picton
- Coordinates: 41.1192583°S 174.2669572°E
- Area: 619 hectares (1,530 acres)
- Established: 1993
- Governing body: Department of Conservation

Long Island-Kokomohua Marine Reserve is a marine reserve, in the Marlborough Region of New Zealand's South Island. It covers an area of 619 hectares at the entrance to the Queen Charlotte Sound in the Marlborough Sounds. It was the first marine reserve established on the South Island.

The reserve includes Long Island and the tiny Kokomohua Islands to its north, and a largely submerged reef which connects the islands and extends north-east about 500m. The marine reserve extends an area a further 463 metres to the northeast, where there are several rocky pinnacles in deep water.

== History ==
=== Pre-reserve history ===
In 1925, a ranger visited Long Island and recommended it become a reserve. A scenic reserve was established on the reserve the following year.

In 1991, local divers recommended the area around the reserve be turned into a marine reserve. Commercial and recreational fishing was stopped in 1992.

=== Reserve history ===
The reserve was formally established in March 1993.

In March 2011, a study commissioned by the Department of Conservation found more large blue cod than at any point in the previous 17 years.

In 2014, a study commissioned by the Department of Conservation identified found marine life had become larger, changed their structure, become more abundant, had become more widely distributed, and changes to their behaviour.

In March 2016, a report by the National Institute of Water and Atmospheric Research identified a dramatic recovery of fish stocks following the end of commercial and recreational fishing. Predatory blue cod has increased by three times, blue moki had increased by 1.4 times, rock lobster had increased by 11.5 times, grazing black foot pāua has increased 1.4 times. There was also two thirds less grazing kina, especially small kina. It concluded this change reflected the resilience of the ecosystem, and the potential for restoration outside the reserve.

In July 2020, the National Institute of Water and Atmospheric Research identified microplastics on the sea floor of the marine reserve.

== Wildlife ==
Large blue cod are abundant in the reserve. The reserve protects fish and shellfish, and seals, penguins and seabirds that feed in the sea. In January 2022, 50 fluttering shearwater (Puffinus gavia) or pakahā chicks were translocated from the reserve to the newly-established Wharariki Ecosanctuary at Cape Farewell They were the first species to be introduced to the new sanctuary.

The rocky pinnacles are a habitat for schools of butterfly perch, tarakihi, rock lobster, blue cod, seaweed, sea sponges, and some dolphins and seals.

== Recreation ==
The reserve is only accessible by boat from Picton. Activities include boating, swimming, snorkelling, and scuba-diving near the rocky reefs on the north-facing shore. Unmarked reefs, tidal changes, strong currents, strong winds and sudden changes in sea conditions can be hazardous. The rocky reefs are a popular feature for divers.

Fishing, and taking or killing in other marine life, is not permitted. However, tangata whenua may access the reserve to remove nephrite and serpentine.

There is no formal count of how many people visit the reserve, but evidence from compliance work suggested there were fewer recreational boats visiting the area by 2000, than before the park was established in 1993.

== See also ==
- Marine reserves of New Zealand
