= Archway Islands =

Island group in New Zealand

- islands
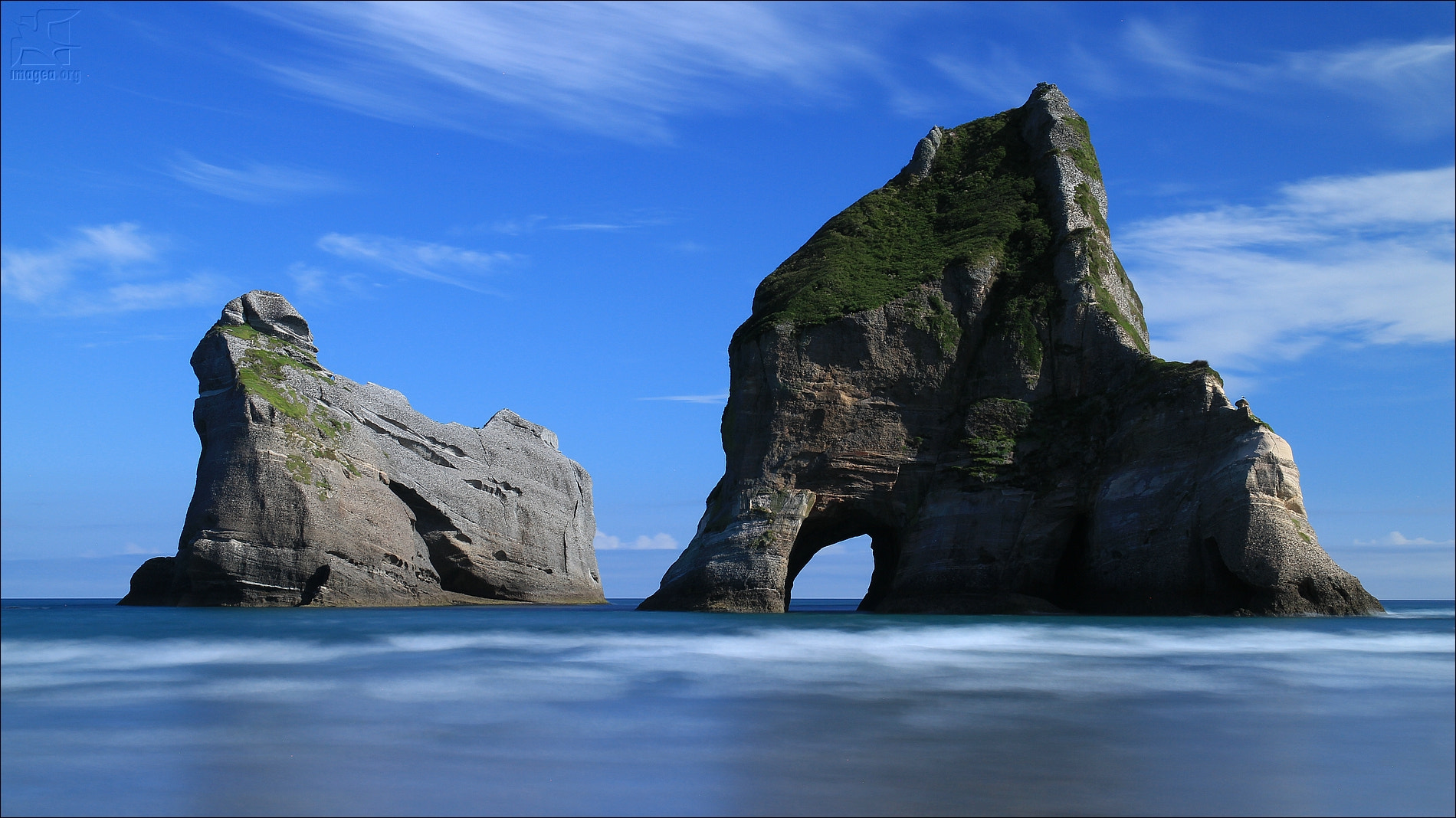
- two of the Archway Islands

- Coordinates: 40°29′56″S 172°40′34″E
- Location: Tasman District, New Zealand
- Offshore water bodies: Tasman Sea

The Archway Islands are a group of four rock stacks or small islands in New Zealand. The islands are located in Tasman District's Golden Bay / Mohua at Wharariki Beach.

== Geography and name ==
The Archway Islands are located just west of the northernmost point of the South Island, Cape Farewell, and at the end of Wharariki Road. West of here, there are only walking tracks along the coast. It takes 20 minutes one way to walk from the car park at the end of Wharariki Road to Wharariki Beach. The Wharariki car park can be reached from Collingwood via Pūponga, where the road turns and becomes Wharariki Road.

The name Archway Islands was formalised and gazetted on 14 November 2013, when the New Zealand Geographic Board made 133 place names official.

The four islands are small, with even the largest one of them measuring only about 300 by 200 metres (980 by 660 ft).

The largest of the islands is closest to the mainland and adjoins Wharariki Beach; it is generally not cut off by the sea. The second island lies about 150 metres (490 ft) offshore and is relatively flat and vegetated. The remaining two islands are typical rock stacks, with the larger one 66 metres (217 ft) tall and containing two natural rock arches, giving rise to the naming of the group of islands.

== Microsoft lock screen ==
The islands came to international prominence in mid-2015 when Microsoft released the Windows 10 operating system, which included a photo of the islands as one of the lock screen images. When Tasman District Council rolled out Windows 10, council staff thought that their IT department had installed a photo of the Archway Islands as a lock screen. It was only after some time that they realised that instead, Microsoft had chosen the image.

== Attractions ==
The adjacent beach is popular for its colony of fur seal pups; during low tide, people have access to the pools where pups play in front of the easternmost of the Archway Islands.
