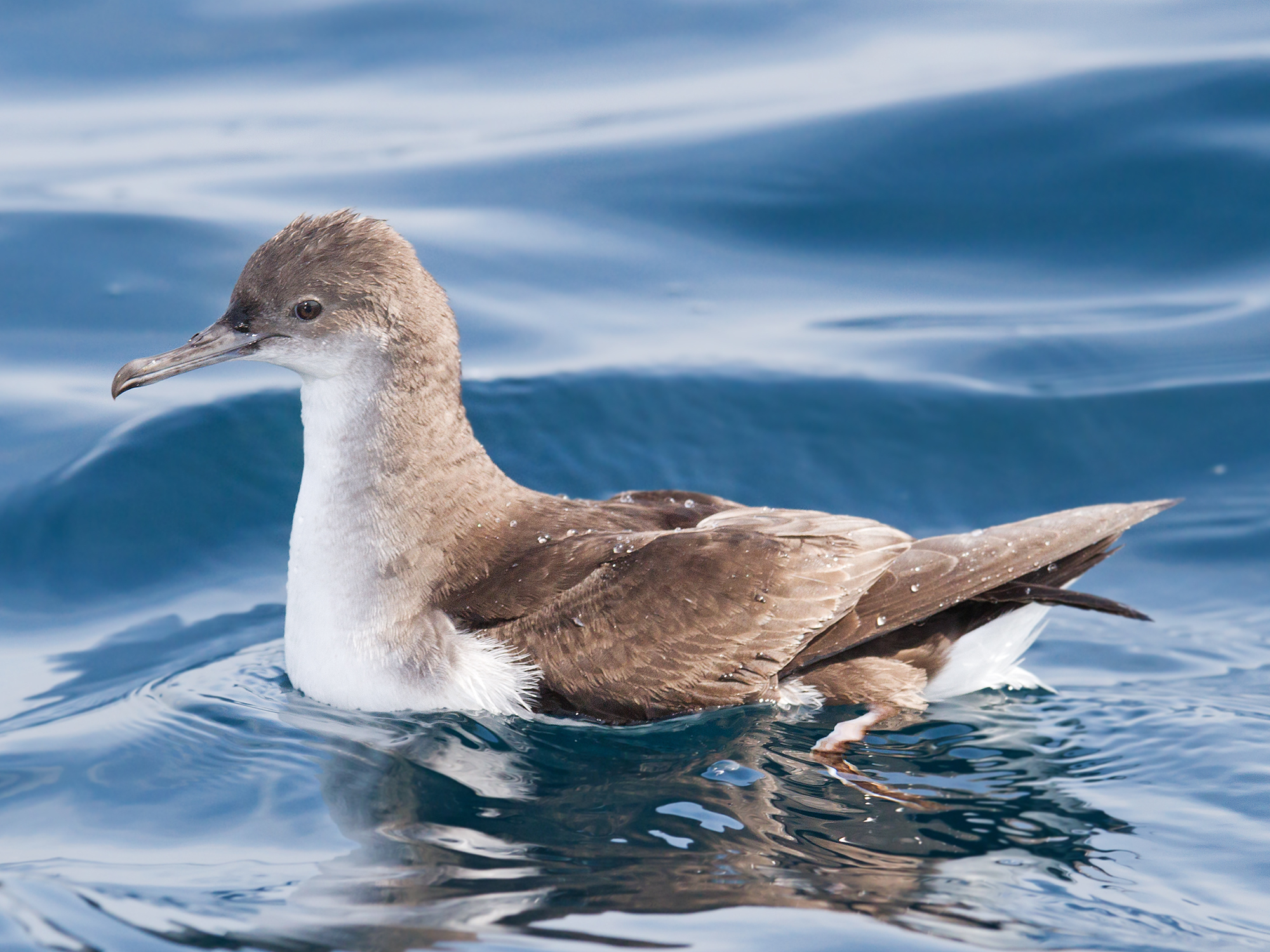

Conservation status
- Least Concern (IUCN 3.1)

Scientific classification
- Kingdom: Animalia
- Phylum: Chordata
- Class: Aves
- Order: Procellariiformes
- Family: Procellariidae
- Genus: Puffinus
- Species: P. gavia

Binomial name
- Puffinus gavia (Forster, 1844)

= Fluttering shearwater =

Species of bird

The fluttering shearwater (Puffinus gavia) is a species of seabird in the family Procellariidae. It is endemic to New Zealand and migrates to Australia and the Solomon Islands. Its natural habitats are open seas and rocky shores. It has been known as Forster's shearwater in the past.

== Description ==
This is a medium to small-sized shearwater with a dark-brown-and-white body. The upper parts, including neck, wings and tail, are uniformly dark brown. The face and neck have a grey-brown colour gradually fading into white below the eye. The under body, from chin to the under-tail, is white except for a dark thigh patch that can be seen in flight. The bottom wing is commonly white while the axillary area is covered in grey-brown fur. Under light conditions, the appearance is different. The fluttering shearwater has pinkish-brown legs and feet with dark webs, and the feet extend beyond the tail in flight. The bill is long and thin with dark colour. The tail is fan-shaped and short in flight and it has mixed colours – dark brown and white.

Moulting starts from late January and the dark upper surfaces fade to mid-brown quickly. The colour of birds close to moulting (February to April) is pale rusty brown and they appear ragged at this stage. Their voice is unusual and disjointed: ka-hek-ka-hek-ka-hek and usually made in flight. Their flight pattern is somewhat determined, low and fast. Rapid spurts of wing-beating interspersed by gliding.

The average body mass of females is 302 g (10.7 oz) while males is 243 g (8.6 oz). Their eggs are pure white and oval. The young birds have the same colour as adult from the nest, but with lighter color in the margin of wing-coverts. Nestlings have very thick slate-coloured soft feathers on the upper and white down on the under.

== Distribution and habitat ==
=== Global range ===
Fluttering shearwaters are an endemic species to New Zealand, where they breed throughout the warmer months of the year, from September to February. However, during the non-breeding months of the year, between March and August, vast numbers are seen throughout eastern and south–eastern Australia, though most seem to linger close to the breeding colonies. It is suspected that it is the juveniles that migrate, whereas the adults stay confined to the rich waters of New Zealand; however, this is not fully understood.

=== New Zealand range ===
Fluttering shearwaters breed on coastal islands throughout New Zealand, with large populations on islands throughout the north-east North Island, such as the Aldermen Islands, Moturoa Island, Bream Islands, north-west Chicken islands, Mercury Islands, Motuharakeke Island (Cavalli Islands), as well as islands throughout the Marlborough Sound/Cook Strait region of the South Island, with a majority of these offshore islands within 40 km of the mainland.

=== Habitat preferences ===
The habitats of fluttering shearwater are marine and terrestrial, including coastal and marine areas, scrubland and forest. They are most commonly found in subtropical waters and warm water (24 °C) of intermediate to high salinity (35%). The birds are common on inshore areas that are easy to enter such as harbours, inlets, bays and straits. They usually select stony, scrub-covered slopes near the peak, as well as cracks and holes in the rock far from the water to breed, which is a benefit for taking off.

== Life cycle/phenology ==
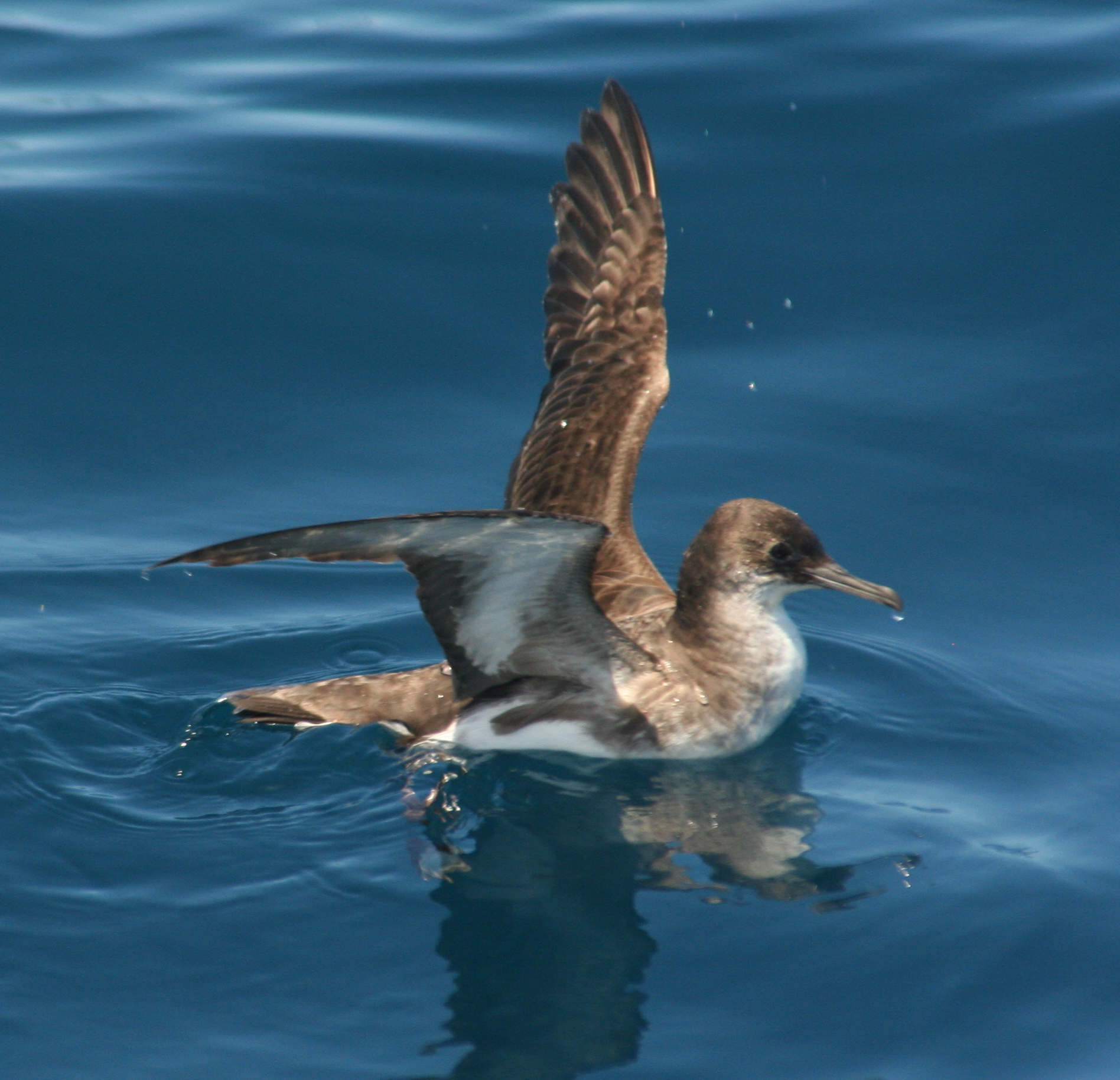
Fluttering shearwater

=== Breeding ===
Surprisingly, very little is known about the breeding biology and phenology of fluttering shearwaters. However, it is known that fluttering shearwaters, like most birds, are monogamous in that they breed with one mate throughout their life. Fluttering shearwaters start to breed when 4–10 years old and the breeding season runs from August to January. They nest in burrows and the nest chamber is made of dead leaves, grass, feathers and shoots. Their burrows are comparatively shallow and they usually built burrows in fragile soils, so if people move around their breeding areas, burrows are easily destroyed. To protect them, access should be strictly restricted.

Like all birds, fluttering shearwaters breed via a process known as true oviparity. With both sexes containing their own sexual reproductive systems and once a female and a male are ready to mate, their reproductive organs, ovaries and testes, begin to swell and produce the ova and sperm, respectively. The male then inseminates the female which fertilises the ova, resulting in a fertilised egg. A singular egg then hatches external to that of the mother.

Some birds stay at colonies throughout the year but most birds fly to colonies in August to woo and sweep burrows for breeding. After mating, females leave colonies for one to six weeks for forming eggs. Males also leave but return to nest sites a few times. Eggs are laid from early September and to mid-October. Usually they lay one white eggs in a burrow or occasionally in crevices and holes among the rock. Sometimes there are two eggs in one nest because two females share a site.

Males and females incubate eggs together and eggs hatch in November. The mean incubation length, nestling period as well as independent age are unknown. Young birds are frequently fed daily by their parents by incomplete ruminate and chicks leave their colonies at night. Fluttering shearwater chicks stay in their burrows and 'wing exercise' in the weeks before fledging. Once they have flown, they are totally independent of their parents.

The breeding success observed on Burgess Island is 63.8%, with 73.3% of hatching success and 88.2% of hatched chicks survival, egg loss and competition with other birds are the main reasons. Chicks are easily attacked because parents usually leave baby birds alone after hatching, only returning to burrows to feed them after long intervals. Many young or old birds may dead on land when they meet bad weather and lack food. Fluttering shearwaters are members of the family Procellariidae, which are characteristically long-lived. The lifespans of several species are over 25 years.

=== Moulting ===
Moulting behaviour is divided into two types – adult post-breeding and post-juvenile. For adults, promptly after the breeding season comes to an end, they begin to moult by discarding older, rundown feathers to make way for the newer, unblemished feathers. This process takes place between late summer up until autumn. The date of moulting for immature birds in South Australia is four to five months ahead of the adults in New Zealand. Feathers in body start to moult in October while feathers in wings is early November. In New Zealand, birds have not yet been recorded moulting that start in October or November, maybe young birds are not appear in areas that near the shore for the first year of life.

=== Migration ===
In the post-breeding season, many birds migrate to parts of eastern and south-eastern Australia. It is suspected that it is only the juveniles that take part in this migration, with the adults remaining within New Zealand and staying within a relatively close proximity to the colonies. They only breed in New Zealand.

== Behaviour ==
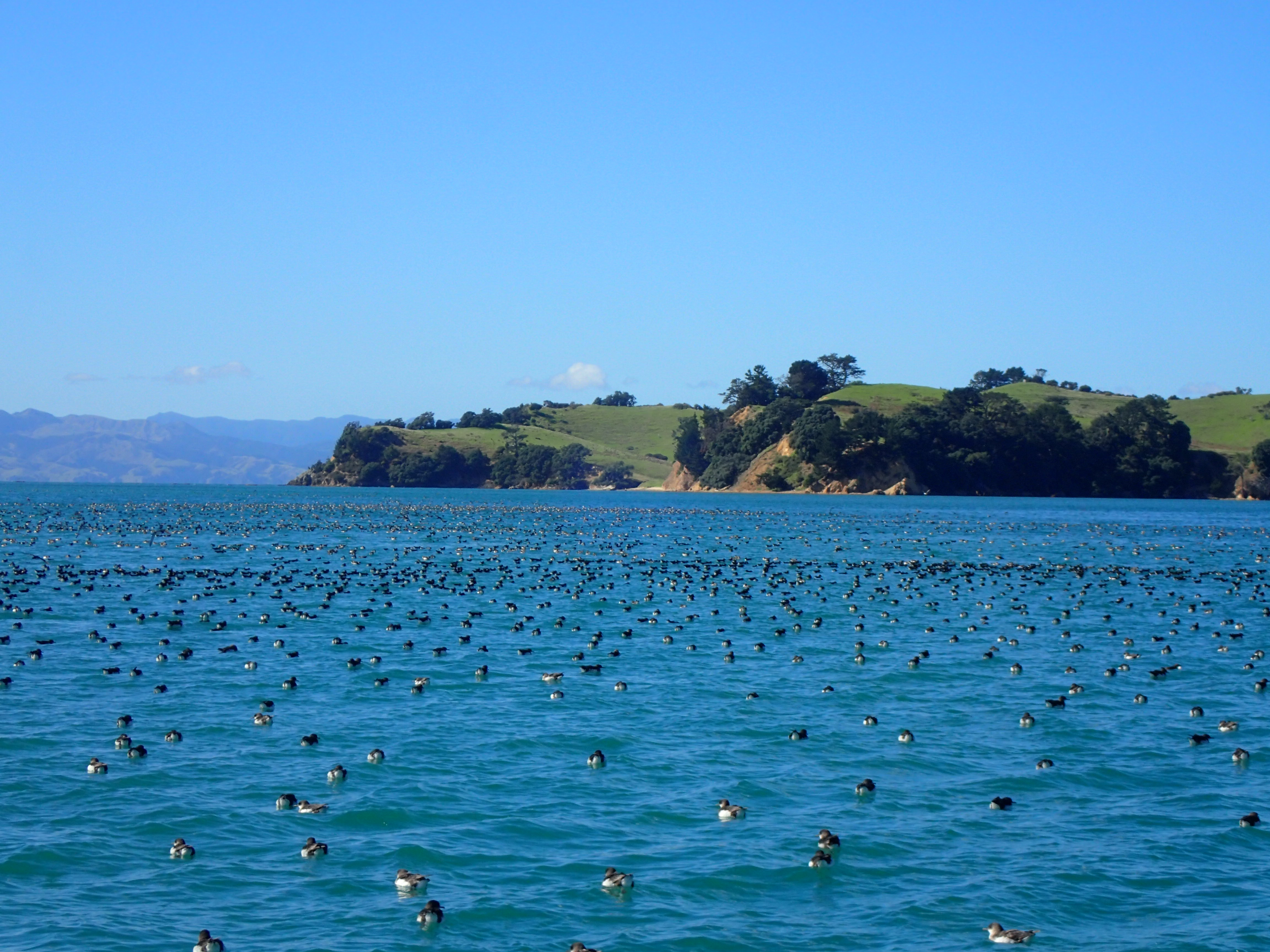
Fluttering shearwaters waiting for the next fishing excursion near Ponui Island

Fluttering shearwaters have a habit of fluttering their wings quickly and beat the feet when they fly away from the sea. A large group of fluttering shearwaters gather together and sit on the water in rafts through the months of mid-December, January and February. Sometimes, rafts will form just near the coastline.

== Feeding ==
The fluttering shearwater's diet consists mostly of schooling fish (such as pilchards, trevally, mackerel, sprats, etc.), small pelagic crustacea (e.g. krill) and squid. This prey is caught through two methods, either surface seizing or pursuit diving. The action of marine currents often concentrates large quantities of prey, such as crustacean, krill and schooling fish, within a close distance to the surface of the water. This allows the shearwater to simultaneously swim atop the water whilst having its head submerged underwater, in an attempt to catch prey.

Pursuit diving is the other form of predation used by the fluttering shearwater, as it provides a greater area in which the shearwater is able to feed compared to surface seizing. Shearwaters are able to chase their prey below the water level through the use of their wings, using the wings to propel them underwater in an attempt to chase their prey. Many members of the genus Puffinus have evolved to have heavier wing loadings in order to aid them in pursuing prey to greater depths underneath the water.

== Predators, parasites and diseases ==
Chicks of the fluttering shearwater were caught by Maori until a government request to protect them in 1953. The predators of fluttering shearwater are mammalian animals such as cats and rats. Fluttering shearwaters have been eradicated from several major breeding colonies due to the introduction of mammals such as feral cats (Felis catus), house rats (Rattus rattus) and brown rats (Rattus norvegicus). Currently all of the major colonies for fluttering shearwaters are on islands free of invasive species, except for one particular case on Saddle Island, where the relatively small colony of shearwaters live in co-existence with the Pacific rats (Rattus exulans) present on the island.

Parasites that utilise fluttering shearwaters as hosts, as noted by Bishop and Heath (1998), are listed below:

Type of parasite	Species	Location on host
Mite	Brephosceles sp.	Feathers
Mite	Zachvatkinia sp.	Feathers
Flea	Parapsyllus jacksoni	Skin

== Threats and conservation ==
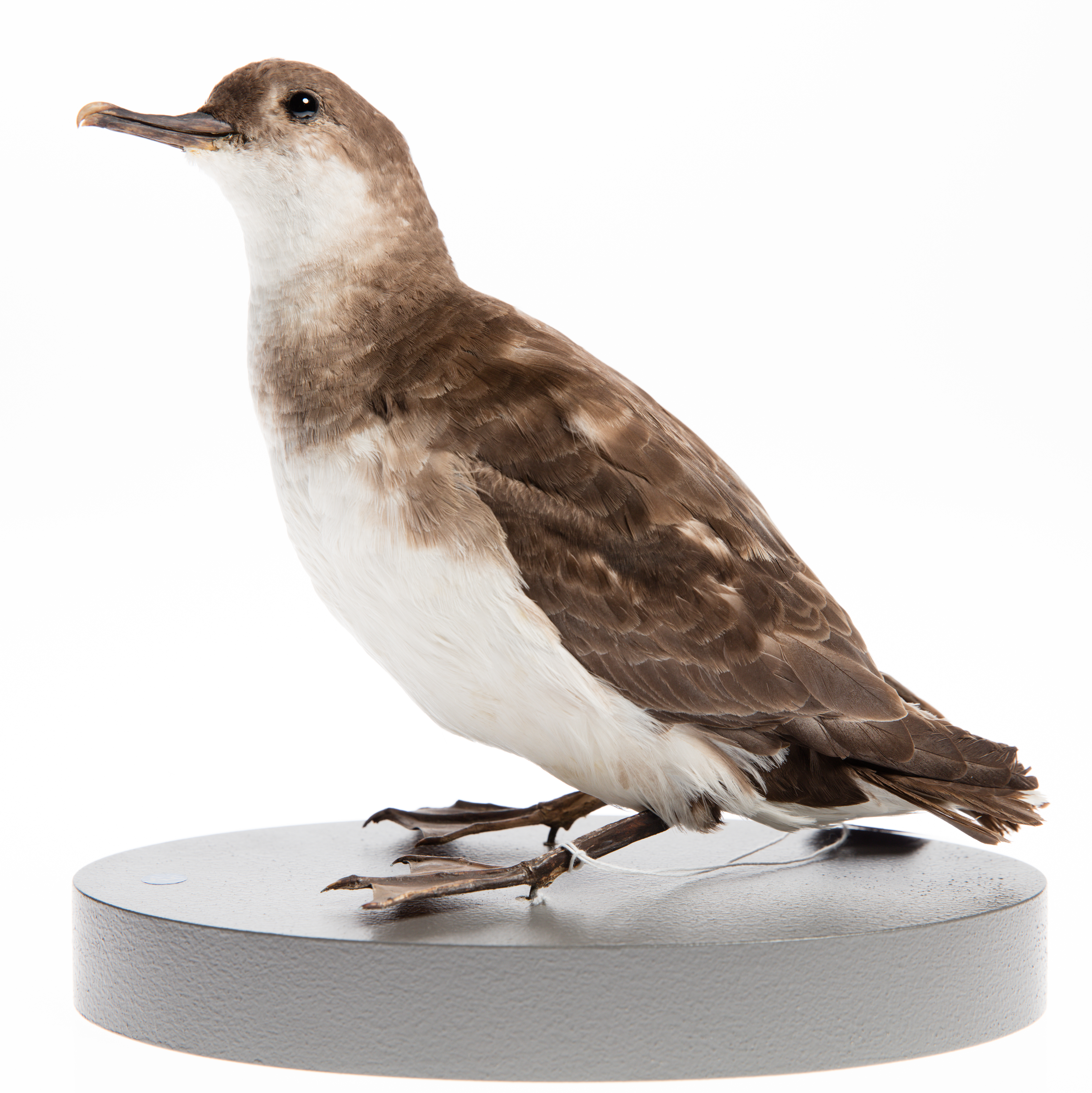
Fluttering shearwater mount in Auckland Museum

=== Anthropogenic threats ===
Humans pose the biggest threat to fluttering shearwaters. Their conservation status is ranked as least concern; however, their population continues to decrease at a steady rate.

With the ever looming problem that is climate change facing the planet, the progressive rise of sea temperatures could have detrimental effects on fluttering shearwater populations, as it could possibly out-synchronise the breeding season with that of the feeding season, leaving not only chicks but also adults with a lack of a dependable food source, resulting in potential mass starvation. At the same time, fluttering shearwaters must face the impacts that fisheries have on marine animal populations. As the human population increases, so does its demand for food, such that it is already adversely affecting the abundance of aquatic animals in the oceans, resulting in less food sources for predatory animals within the environment.

Fishing ships do not usually attract fluttering shearwaters. However, as they commonly search for food in flocks, they are frequently trapped in fishing gear in inshore sea areas. Because of this, 166 fluttering shearwaters died in a single event at Whangaparaoa Peninsula in May 2009. Over-fishing, especially through purse-seine fishing, could make a great difference to fluttering shearwaters. Oil spills are a risk, too. In October 2011, a container ship Rena was stranded in the Bay of Plenty and more than 240 fluttering shearwaters were killed by the spilled oil.

Anthropogenic pollution is copious throughout the planet's oceans and it is also commonly mistaken as a potential food source by animals such as the fluttering shearwater. Reportedly, 50% of the world's seabird species have been negatively affected by the digestion of marine debris, and those situated around the Southern Ocean boundary being at most risk as this is an identified hotspot for the issue. Coincidentally this is also where the fluttering shearwater spends its entire life, in and around these waters.

=== Translocation to establish new colonies ===
Petrels, along with other types of seabird exhibit natal philopatry - they return to their natal colony to breed. This means that the loss of a breeding colony through predation, landslides or human interference can have severe consequences for the population. Conservation initiatives for endangered seabirds include attempts to establish new breeding colonies by translocation from existing colonies, and hand-feeding of the chicks before they fledge.

Burrow-nesting seabirds such as shearwaters play an important role in the ecosystem of many New Zealand islands. The birds enrich the soil in the breeding colony with nutrients from the sea through their guano and regurgitation. These nutrients feed invertebrates, and this in turn feeds lizards, tuatara and land birds. Translocation of chicks to establish new breeding colonies is also part of long-term strategy to restore the environment, including offshore islands that were once farmed but are now protected areas.

Experience with translocation shows that some of the chicks that are moved to a new location before they fledge may return as adults to breed at the new location. The proportion of translocated birds that return to breed at the new site appears to be closely related to the weight of chicks and duration of time they spent at new colonies. Chicks of higher weight and that spent more time in the new location before fledging are more likely to return to breed at the new site. Further research on translocation will focus on increasing weight and length of stay time. The establishment of new colonies (particularly in predator-free locations) will help ensure the survival of fluttering shearwaters.

==== Translocation projects ====
Between 1991 and 1996, 334 fluttering shearwater chicks were moved from Long Island in the Marlborough Sounds to Maud Island. Artificial burrows were constructed at the new site, and the chicks were fed until they were ready to fledge.

Between 2012 and 2014, 237 fluttering shearwater chicks were translocated from Long Island to Matiu / Somes Island in Wellington Harbour. By 2019, around a quarter of all the birds translocated to Matiu / Somes Island had returned to breed at that site. During the 2024/2025 breeding season, researchers monitoring the colony handled 94 birds, and recorded 40 eggs laid and 37 chicks fledged, representing a 93% breeding success rate. The net growth of the colony between 2001 and 2004 was an average of 2.8 birds per year, with productivity limited by an imbalance of males and females. The survival rates of fledglings from Matiu / Somes Island have been reduced by crash landings caused by light pollution.

In January 2022, 50 chicks were translocated from the Long Island – Kokomohua Marine Reserve in Queen Charlotte Sound to the Wharariki Ecosanctuary at Cape Farewell. The transfer was the result of a collaborative project between HealthPost Nature Trust, the Department of Conservation and Manawhenua ki Mohua, which represents Ngāti Tama, Te Ātiawa and Ngāti Rārua in Golden Bay. In September 2025, the first fluttering shearwater named Yonga, returned to the Wharariki Ecosanctuary after first being translocated in January 2022. In November 2025, the first chick to be raised naturally in the sanctuary area hatched in a monitored burrow. The chick fledged successfully.
