= SS Port Kembla =

Steamer owned by the Commonwealth and Dominion Line

History
- Name: SS Port Kembla
- Owner: Commonwealth and Dominion Line
- Builder: Hawthorn Leslie & Co. Ltd.
- Yard number: 439
- Launched: 22 July 1910
- In service: 1910
- Fate: Sunk 18 September 1917

General characteristics
- Tonnage: 4,700 GRT, 2,990 NRT
- Length: 121 m
- Beam: 16 m
- Installed power: steam

SS Port Kembla was a steamer owned by the Commonwealth and Dominion Line and named after Port Kembla, New South Wales, Australia. She was sunk 17 kilometres (11 miles) off Farewell Spit on New Zealand′s South Island on 18 September 1917 by a mine laid by the Imperial German Navy auxiliary cruiser SMS Wolf. During an inquiry held in Wellington, New Zealand, shortly after the sinking it was thought that the explosion was from an internal source rather than a mine. Regulus rescued the survivors.

When she sank, the ship was fully laden with frozen produce, wool, skins, tallow, jams, lead, and general cargo which was being shipped from Australia to the United Kingdom for use during World War I.

The wreck of Port Kembla is at 40°27.68′S 172°27.32′E at a depth of 96 metres (315 ft) and is visited by scuba divers. In 1977, a plan to salvage 1,200 tonnes of lead from the wreck did not come to fruition because of ownership disputes. As of 2012, plans were being made for a second attempt to recover the lead.

== Sources ==
- Ingram, Charles William; Wheatley, Percy Owen; Diggle, Lynton; Diggle, Edith; Gordon, Keith (2007). New Zealand Shipwrecks: Over 200 Years of Disasters at Sea (8th ed.). Auckland: Hodder Moa. ISBN 978-1869710934.
