= Pūponga =

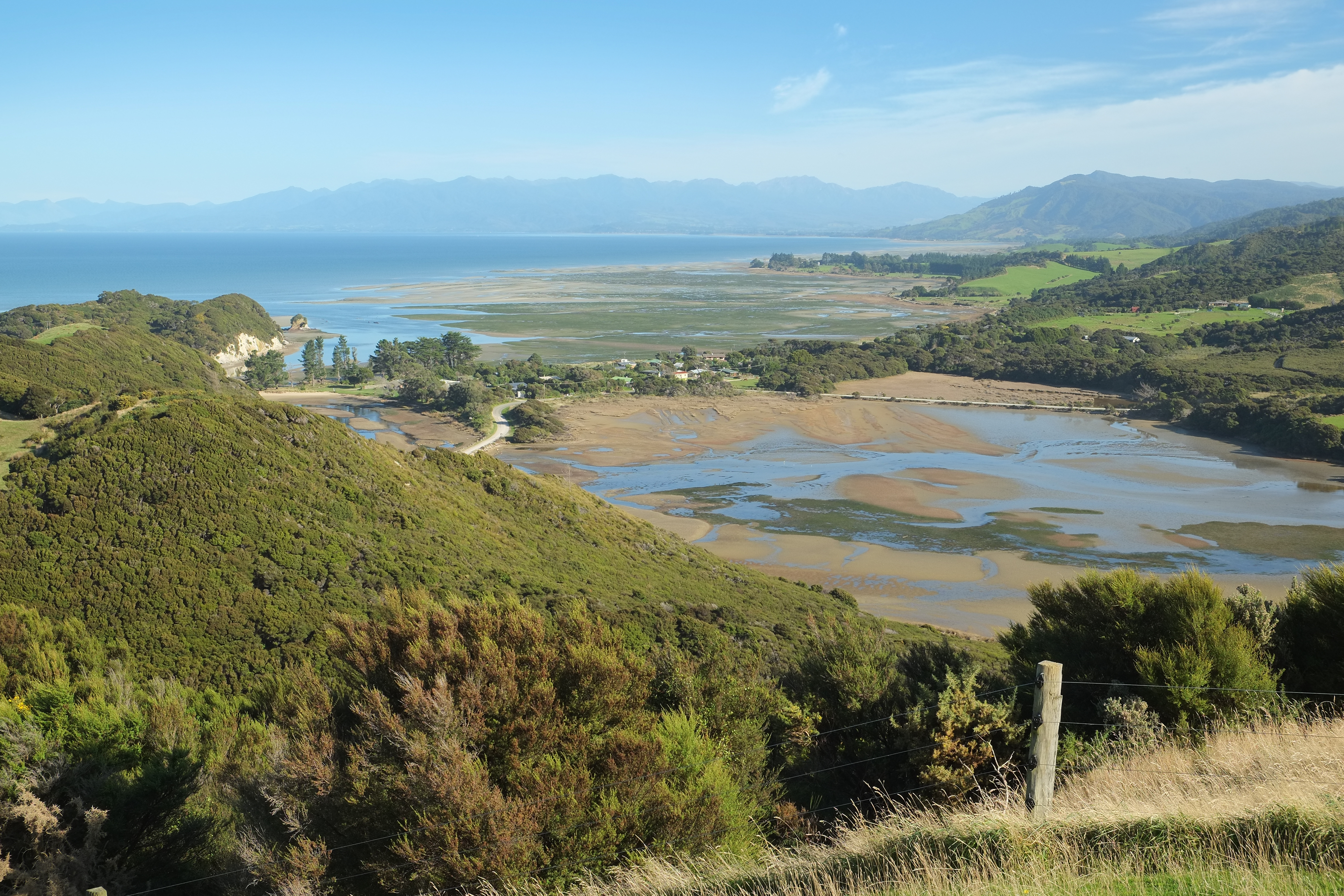
- Port Pūponga seen from Pūponga
- Interactive map of Pūponga
- Coordinates: 40.521°S 172.719°E
- Country: New Zealand
- Territorial authority: Tasman
- Ward: Golden Bay
- Electorates: West Coast-Tasman; Te Tai Tonga (Māori)

Government
  - Territorial authority: Tasman District Council
  - Mayor of Tasman: Tim King
  - West Coast-Tasman MP: Maureen Pugh
  - Te Tai Tonga MP: Tākuta Ferris

Area
  - Total: 31.71 km^{2} (12.24 sq mi)

Population (2023 census)
  - Total: 198
  - Density: 6.24/km^{2} (16.2/sq mi)
- Time zone: UTC+12 (NZST)
  - Summer (DST): UTC+13 (NZDT)
- Area code: 03

Pūponga is a tiny settlement in New Zealand and is the northernmost settlement in the South Island. It is in the Tasman District, 18 kilometres (11 mi) north of Collingwood, at the foot of Farewell Spit. The spit's airstrip, Triangle Flat Airstrip is just northeast of Pūponga. The settlement of Pūponga is inland; the settlement located on the coast is called Port Pūponga.

Just to the northeast of the village, a car park at a cafe was the starting point for tours of Farewell Spit. However, the cafe burned down on 30 November 2019 and has been closed since. Popular walks in the area include short walks to Cape Farewell, the northernmost point of the South Island, and to Wharariki Beach.

== Demographics ==
Pūponga locality covers 31.71 km^{2} (12.24 sq mi) and includes Farewell Spit. It is part of the larger Golden Bay / Mohua statistical area.

Historical population
Year	Pop.	±% p.a.
2006	147	—
2013	186	+3.42%
2018	192	+0.64%
2023	198	+0.62%

Pūponga had a population of 198 in the 2023 New Zealand census, an increase of 6 people (3.1%) since the 2018 census, and an increase of 12 people (6.5%) since the 2013 census. There were 93 males, 99 females, and 3 people of other genders in 72 dwellings. 3.0% of people identified as LGBTIQ+. The median age was 48.4 years (compared with 38.1 years nationally). There were 33 people (16.7%) aged under 15 years, 21 (10.6%) aged 15 to 29, 99 (50.0%) aged 30 to 64, and 42 (21.2%) aged 65 or older.

People could identify as more than one ethnicity. The results were 93.9% European (Pākehā), 7.6% Māori, and 3.0% other, which includes people giving their ethnicity as "New Zealander". English was spoken by 98.5%, Māori by 3.0%, and other languages by 10.6%. The percentage of people born overseas was 27.3, compared with 28.8% nationally.

Religious affiliations were 19.7% Christian, 3.0% Hindu, 3.0% Buddhist, 3.0% New Age, and 3.0% other religions. People who answered that they had no religion were 63.6%, and 7.6% of people did not answer the census question.

Of those at least 15 years old, 51 (30.9%) people had a bachelor's or higher degree, 87 (52.7%) had a post-high school certificate or diploma, and 21 (12.7%) people exclusively held high school qualifications. The median income was $29,100, compared with $41,500 nationally. 9 people (5.5%) earned over $100,000 compared to 12.1% nationally. The employment status of those at least 15 was 54 (32.7%) full-time and 45 (27.3%) part-time.

== Education ==
Puponga School opened in 1905 and closed in 1941, merging to Pākawau School. Pākawau School, which opened in 1873, closed in 1981.
