= Farewell Spit =

Narrow sand spit in New Zealand

Coordinates: 40°31′S 172°52′E

- IUCN category Ia (strict nature reserve)
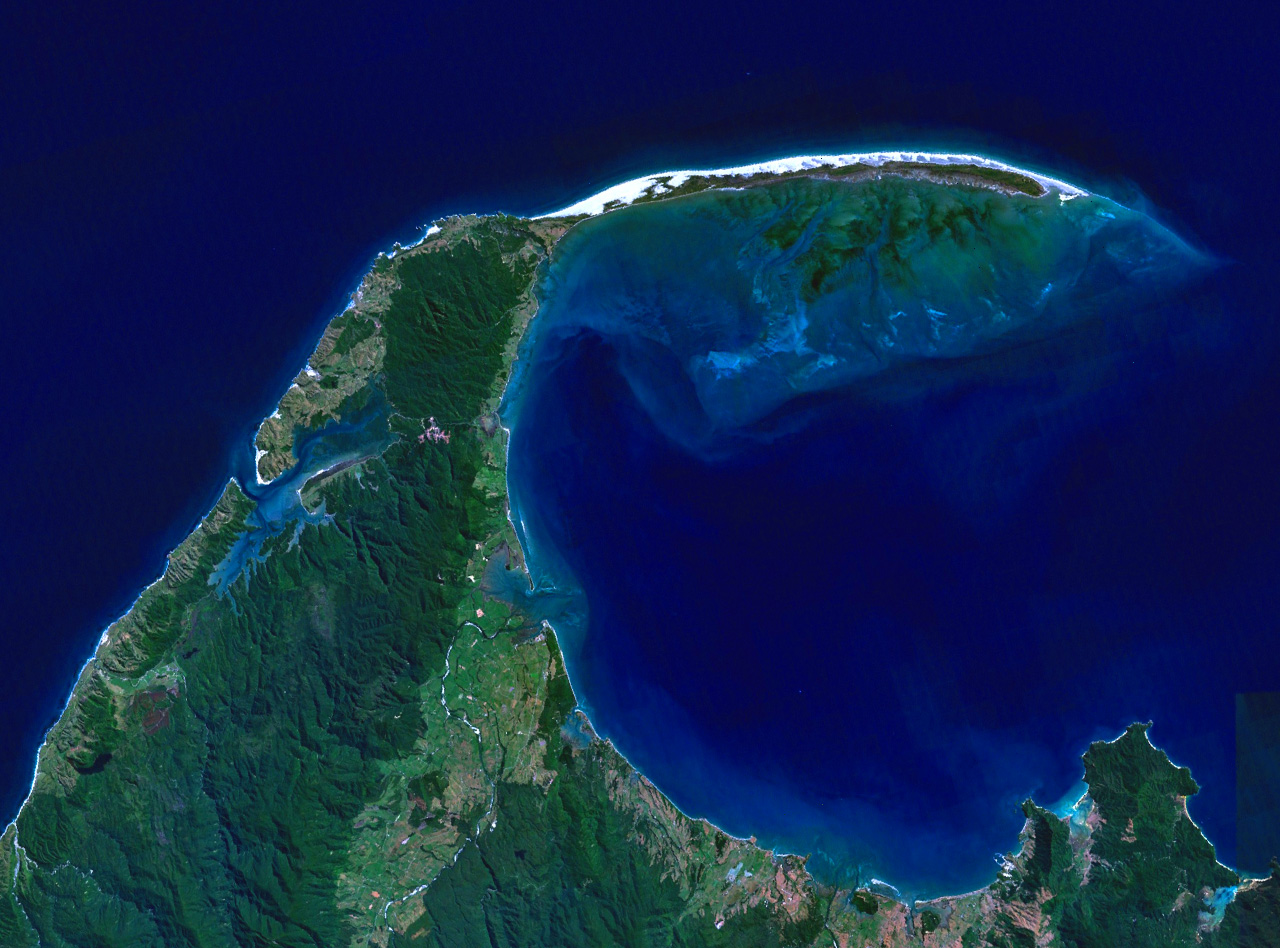
- NASA satellite image of Farewell Spit
- Location: Golden Bay, New Zealand
- Area: 11,388 hectares (28,140 acres)

Ramsar Wetland
- Designated: 13 August 1976
- Reference no.: 103

Farewell Spit (Māori: Onetahua) is a narrow sand spit at the northern end of Golden Bay, in the South Island of New Zealand. The spit includes around 25 km (16 mi) of stable land and another 5 km (3.1 mi) of mobile sand spit running eastwards from Cape Farewell, the northern-most point of the South Island. Farewell Spit is the longest sand spit in New Zealand, and is a legally protected nature reserve. The area is designated as a Ramsar wetland site and an East Asian–Australasian Flyway Shorebird Network Site. Farewell Spit is administered by the Department of Conservation as a seabird and wildlife reserve. Apart from a small area at the base of the spit, it is closed to the public except through organised tours. Conservation initiatives are in progress towards eliminating mammalian predators from Farewell Spit, including a proposal for a predator-proof fence.

The spit has been the site of many shipwrecks and vessel strandings, particularly in the era of merchant sailing vessels. A lighthouse with a tower constructed from timber was established on the end of the spit in 1870 to warn mariners of the dangers of the shoals and currents near the spit. The timbers of the original lighthouse did not last, and the entire lighthouse was replaced in 1897 using a steel lattice tower.

The spit is also known for herd strandings of long-finned pilot whales, and has been described as a ‘whale trap’ because of its protruding coastlines and long, gently sloping beaches.

== Toponymy ==
The Māori name for the spit is Onetahua, translated as "heaped up sand".

Abel Tasman in 1642 was the first European to see the spit, calling it Sand Duining Hoeck. Captain James Cook was the next European visitor in 1770, showing Farewell Spit as a broad peninsula on his maps. He named the nearby Cape Farewell, and the name stuck, with early European settlers originally calling the sandbanks 'Cape Farewell Spit' before it was shortened to its present name. It was the last land Cook sighted after leaving New Zealand for Australia at the end of his first voyage.

== Geography ==
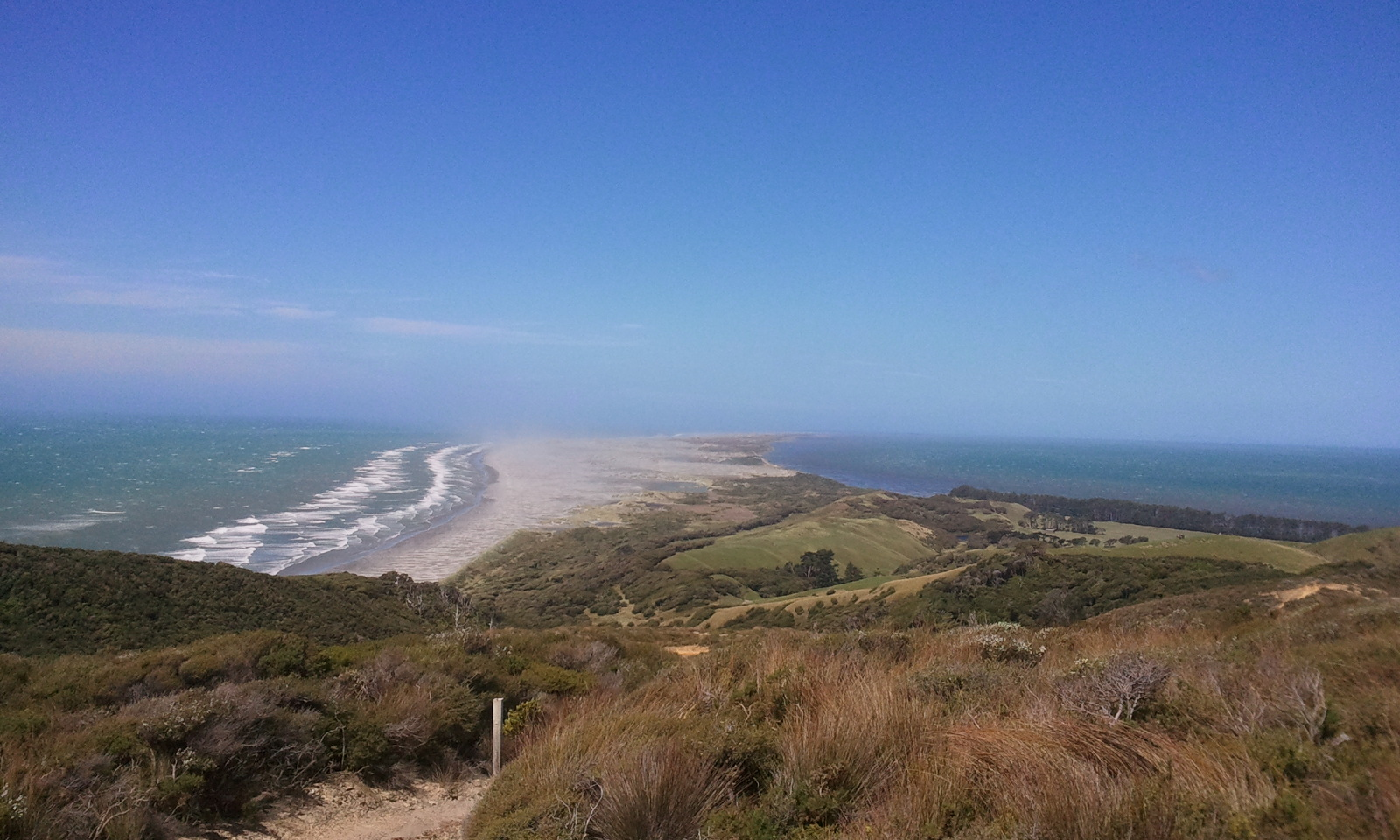
Farewell Spit looking east from Pūponga

Farewell Spit forms the northern side of Golden Bay and is the longest sandspit in New Zealand, including around 25 kilometres (16 mi) of stable land and another 5 kilometres (3.1 mi) of mobile sand spit. The spit runs from west to east, and is formed from fine golden-coloured quartz sands derived from the erosion of granites and other rocks in the Southern Alps and transported northwards along the West Coast by longshore drift with the Westland current.

The area of the spit is about 11,388 ha (28,140 acres). Approximately 1,961 ha (4,850 acres) is above mean high water, with an intertidal zone of about 9,427 ha (23,290 acres). The spit is located about 50 km (31 mi) north of Tākaka and 20 km (12 mi) from Collingwood. The small settlement of Pūponga is situated close to the western (landward) end of the spit.

The sand structures of Farewell Spit consist of two interacting systems. On the southern side of the spit there are older and relatively stable sand masses, separated by shallow lakes and swamps. On the northern side are more recent sand masses that undergo active erosion and accumulation as a result of winds and deposition from the longshore current. Sand dunes known as barchans are formed on the spit because of the influence of winds predominantly from the west, and these dunes move in an easterly direction. The downwind face is steep and has a crescent shape.

The northern side of the dunes is steeper and unstable, being constantly exposed to the prevailing winds that average over 25 km/h (16 mph). The southern side that faces Golden Bay is more stable and largely covered with vegetation. The tide here can recede as much as seven km (4.3 mi) exposing some 80 km^{2} (31 sq mi) of mud flats; a rich feeding ground for the many seabirds in the area but also a trap for whales that leads to herd strandings.

== Climate ==
Climate data for Farewell Spit (1991–2020)
Month	Jan	Feb	Mar	Apr	May	Jun	Jul	Aug	Sep	Oct	Nov	Dec	Year
Mean daily maximum °C (°F)	21.9 (71.4)	22.3 (72.1)	20.8 (69.4)	18.5 (65.3)	16.3 (61.3)	14.1 (57.4)	13.3 (55.9)	14.0 (57.2)	15.5 (59.9)	17.1 (62.8)	18.6 (65.5)	20.4 (68.7)	17.7 (63.9)
Daily mean °C (°F)	18.2 (64.8)	18.6 (65.5)	17.3 (63.1)	15.3 (59.5)	13.3 (55.9)	11.2 (52.2)	10.4 (50.7)	10.9 (51.6)	12.2 (54.0)	13.6 (56.5)	14.9 (58.8)	16.8 (62.2)	14.4 (57.9)
Mean daily minimum °C (°F)	14.5 (58.1)	14.9 (58.8)	13.9 (57.0)	12.1 (53.8)	10.3 (50.5)	8.3 (46.9)	7.4 (45.3)	7.7 (45.9)	8.9 (48.0)	10.2 (50.4)	11.3 (52.3)	13.2 (55.8)	11.1 (51.9)
Average rainfall mm (inches)	90.5 (3.56)	72.8 (2.87)	77.1 (3.04)	103.8 (4.09)	130.1 (5.12)	146.1 (5.75)	101.5 (4.00)	111.0 (4.37)	115.5 (4.55)	99.6 (3.92)	75.3 (2.96)	93.0 (3.66)	1,216.3 (47.89)
Source: NIWA

== Protected area ==
Farewell Spit is a legally protected area of Crown property, and is classified as a nature reserve under s20 of the Reserves Act 1977. The spit was originally established as a Flora and Fauna Reserve in 1938. In 1980, the status was altered to nature reserve, and the adjacent inter-tidal zone designated as a wildlife sanctuary. Access into the nature reserve is by permit only, but walkers are allowed on the first 4 km (2.5 mi) of the spit.

Farewell Spit was designated as a Wetland of International Importance under the Ramsar Convention in 1976, when the convention came into effect in New Zealand. In 2000, to recognise the importance of the site to migratory birds, Farewell Spit was designated an East Asian–Australasian Flyway Shorebird Network Site. New Zealand became a partner in the East Asian – Australasian Flyway Partnership (EAAFP) in September 2011.

== Birds ==
Farewell Spit provides a wide variety of habitats for birds, including ocean sand beaches, bare and vegetated sand dunes, salt marshes, and lakes both freshwater and brackish. These habitats support internationally important numbers of bar-tailed godwit, red knot, ruddy turnstone and banded dotterel, as well as the endemic variable and South Island pied oystercatchers. The dunes at the end of the spit support the only sea-level colony of Australasian gannets in the world. The eelgrass (Zostera) beds on the tidal flats are used by the largest moulting population of black swans in New Zealand. In 2014, an area of 11,388 ha (43.97 sq mi) at Farewell Spit was recognised as an Important Bird and Biodiversity Area (IBA) by BirdLife International.

=== Shorebirds ===
A study of shorebirds at the top of the South Island, commissioned by the Nelson City and Tasman District councils, was published in 2013. This study reported that from 2006 to 2009, the population of coastal shorebirds found in the estuaries at the top of the South Island represented between 14 and 22% of the total New Zealand shorebird population. Over the period of one year, between 45% and 66% of shorebirds in the study region were found at Farewell Spit. During summer, there is an average of about 29,000 shorebirds at Farewell Spit, representing 10.2% of the national population. During winter (June), there is an average of 8,500 birds, representing 6.5% of the national population, and in spring (November) there is an average of 20,000, representing 13.2% of the national population. Farewell Spit typically has more than 20,000 shorebirds present during summer and spring, and this meets the criteria for recognition under Ramsar Convention Criterion 5 as a wetland site of international importance.

During spring and summer, migratory waders make up a large proportion of the shorebirds at Farewell Spit (up to 93% during spring). Farewell Spit is a site of international importance for migratory bar-tailed godwits. Surveys have found an average of 11,872 godwits are present in the summer period, representing 9.1% of the total estimated numbers of this species in the flyway.

Farewell Spit is also of international importance for shorebirds such as the South Island pied oyster-catcher. Surveys have found an average of 6,980 of these birds during summer, representing 7% of the estimated national population. The spit is also an important wintering area and a site of international importance for the banded dotterel.

=== Australasian gannets ===
A breeding colony of Australasian gannets was identified at Farewell Spit in 1983. The size of the colony increased from 75 nests in 1983 to 3,060 nests in 2001, and a 2006 survey recorded 3,300 pairs. The breeding area comprises several discrete sub-colonies at the end of the spit, around 30 minutes walk past the lighthouse. The breeding colonies are only a few metres above sea level, which is unusual because gannet colonies are usually well above sea level on high, stable rock formations. In January 1997, three of the sub-colonies were completely washed away during Cyclone Drena. In most years, some of the colonies are washed over during very high tides or major storms. In 2022, there were 10,000 birds in the colony.

=== Other seabirds ===
Other seabirds that nest on shellbanks on Farewell Spit include Caspian terns and white-fronted terns.

=== Waterfowl ===
Farewell Spit has been identified as the largest moulting site for black swans in the country, with up to 15% of the total population present between November and March. Significant numbers of Australasian shoveler have also been reported.

== Conservation initiatives ==
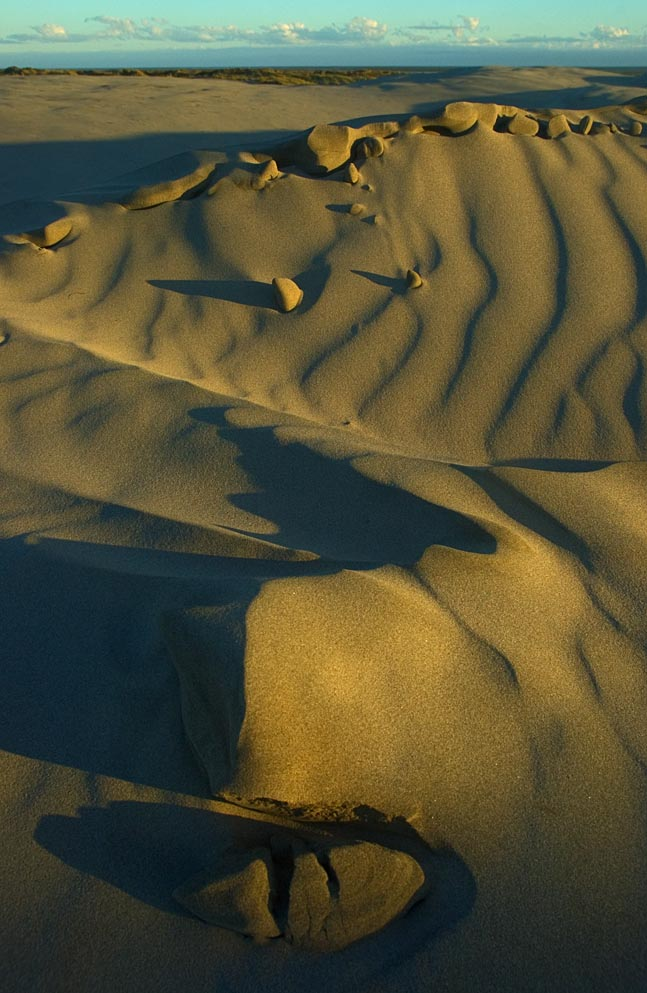
Sand dunes on Farewell Spit

Farewell Spit was leased for grazing from around the 1850s, and extensive damage to vegetation was caused by grazing and fires. In 1938, the area was given protection and designated as a sanctuary. However, wild cattle remained in the area, and 258 were removed in the 1970s.

The adjoining Puponga Farm was originally purchased by the Crown to serve primarily as a buffer zone to protect the Farewell Spit Nature Reserve. Later purchases of Whararaki and Cape Farewell Farms helped to create a viable farm management unit, conserve biological and landscape values, and provide opportunities for public recreation. Puponga Farm Park serves as a visitor management and servicing area for the Farewell Spit Nature Reserve.

As at 2025, there were still feral pigs and other pest mammal species on Farewell Spit, and these animals are a significant threat to nesting birds and ecosystems. The Pest Free Onetahua project aims to eradicate pests from Whanganui Inlet on the West Coast, all the way to Farewell Spit, covering an area of more than 12,000 hectares (30,000 acres). The project is a joint initiative between HealthPost Nature Trust, Tasman Environmental Trust, Manawhenua ki Mohua, Department of Conservation, local landowners and the Mohua Golden Bay Community. In 2022, a proposal was developed for a pest-exclusion fence along the base of the spit. Construction began in 2025 at Wharariki Beach with the installation of the first sections of a 3.5-kilometre (2.2 mi) fence along the Old Man Range. Pest elimination work began from the end of the spit, working back towards the fence, and targeting pigs, possoms, stoats and hares. The project aimed to complete the fence and the pest eradication on the spit by the end of summer 2026.

== Lighthouse ==
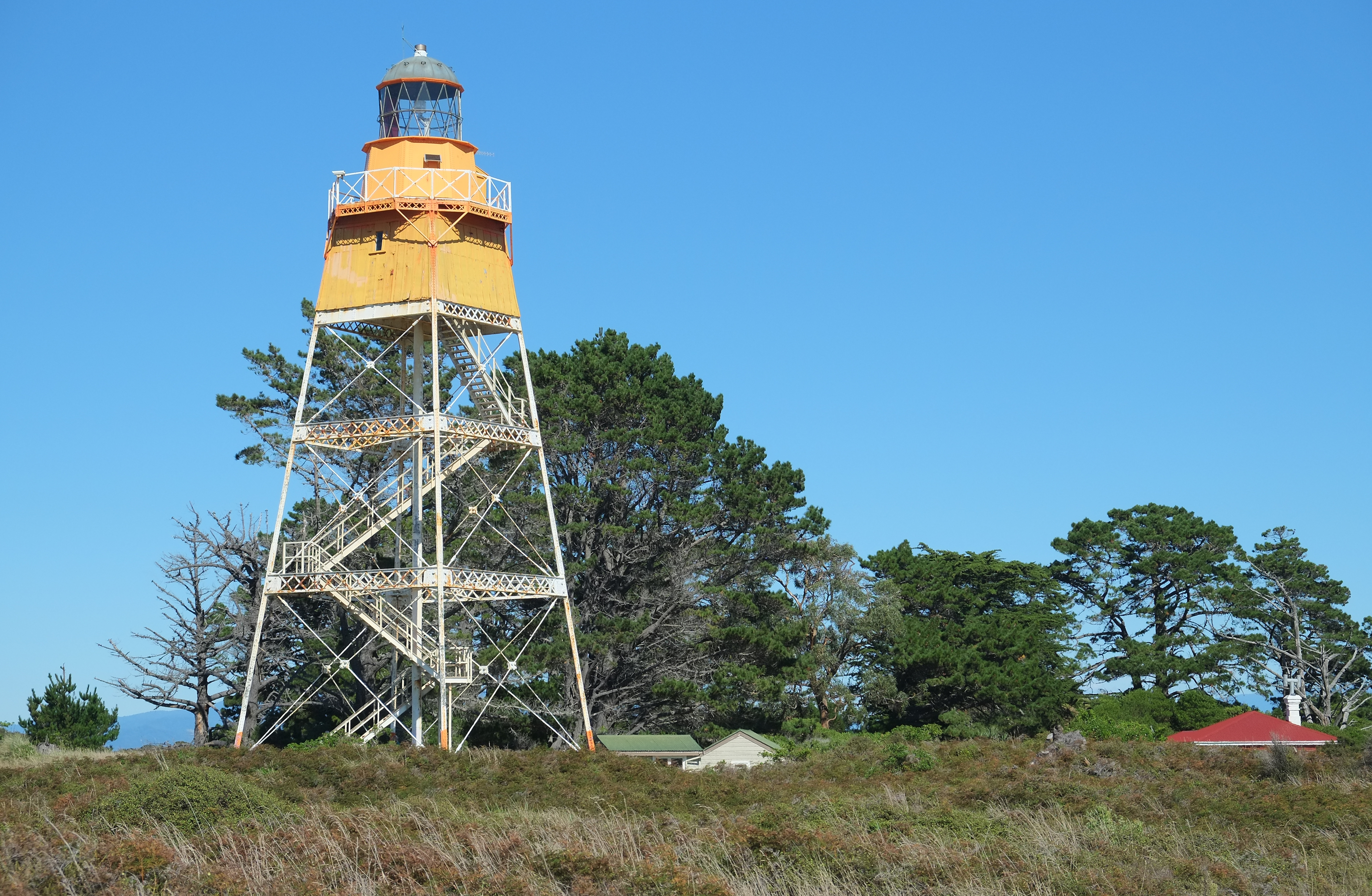
The automated lighthouse at the end of Farewell Spit

The Farewell Spit Lighthouse at the end of the spit was first lit on 17 June 1870 in response to many ships having been wrecked upon the spit. The original timber tower did not stand up well to the frequent blasting by the sand and salt-laden winds experienced at the end of the spit. The hardwood used started to decay rapidly and the original tower was replaced in 1897 by the present structure, the only steel latticework lighthouse in New Zealand.

The foundations of the lighthouse are only just above sea level, so the lighthouse tower has to be taller than usual for other lighthouses around New Zealand's coast. The light of the 27-metre-high (89 ft) tower can be seen for 35 kilometres (22 mi). The light was fully automated and the last lighthouse keeper was withdrawn in 1984. The lighthouse keeper's house and two accommodation buildings are still being maintained for use by the Department of Conservation, Maritime New Zealand, and tour groups.

== Tourism ==
Four-wheel drive bus tours from Collingwood or Pūponga are operated by concession-holders. These tours provide an opportunity to view the large sand dunes, visit the lighthouse area and the gannet colony.

== Shipwrecks ==
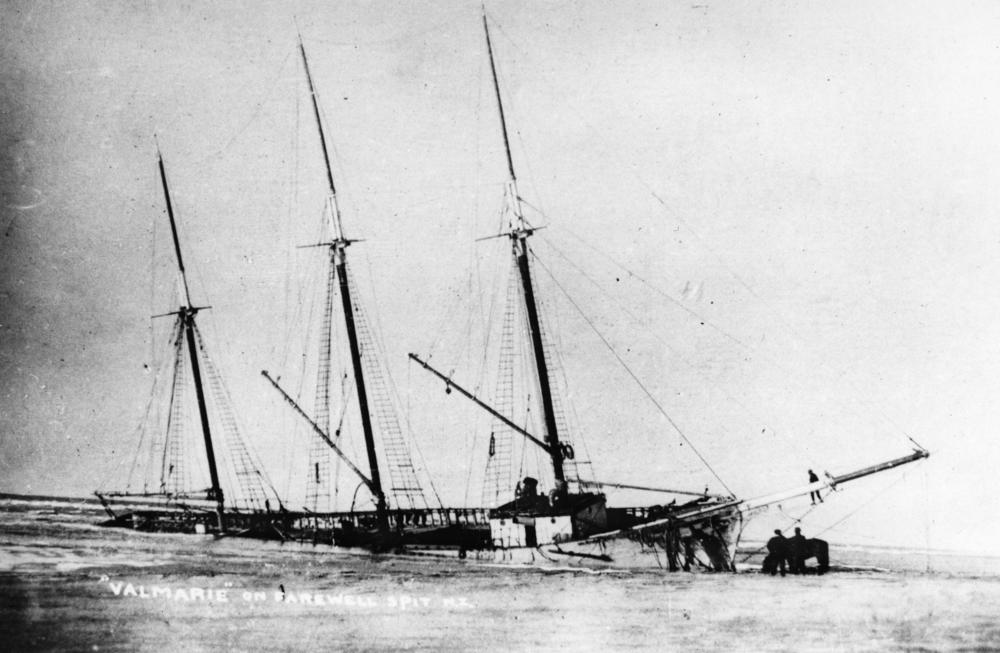
Valmarie aground in 1922

Farewell Spit has been the site of many shipwrecks and vessel strandings, particularly in the era of merchant sailing vessels. Most of these incidents occurred when a vessel became grounded on sand in shallow water near the Spit either through navigational errors or being driven ashore in adverse weather. Particularly notable losses include the Queen Bee that ran aground off Farewell Spit in 1877 and the SS Port Kembla that was sunk by a mine 17 km off the spit in 1917.

List of shipwrecks and groundings at Farewell Spit
Year	Month	Vessel name	Description	Tonnage	Notes
1840	February	Vittoria	Barque	281	Wrecked
1847	May	Louisa Campbell	Barque	274	Wrecked
1866	July	Deese	Schooner	96	Wrecked
1866	September	Wallaby	Steamer		Grounded but refloated
1866	October	Juno	Barque		Wrecked
1869	May	Necromancer	Schooner	16	Wrecked
1871	May	Foam	Ketch	40	Wrecked
1875	March	Melbourne	Schooner	53	Wrecked
1877	August	Queen Bee	Fully rigged	726	Wrecked
1879	September	Messenger	Barque	925	Wrecked
1885	June	Helena	Brigantine	149	Wrecked
1887	February	Hauraki	Steamship	87	Wrecked
1889	September	Koranni	Steamship		Refloated
1897	January	Ruapehu	Steamship	4202	Refloated
1898	July	Unknown	Barque		Refloated
1899	January	Sir Henry	Brigantine		
1902	August	Oreti			
1917	September	Port Kembla	Steamship	4000	Sunk, suspected struck a mine
1922	March	Valmarie	Schooner		Salvaged
1953		Arethusa	Yacht		Salvaged
2021	July	Mistral	Fishing vessel		Wrecked
2022	April	Scorpio	Fishing vessel		Sunk

== Whale strandings ==
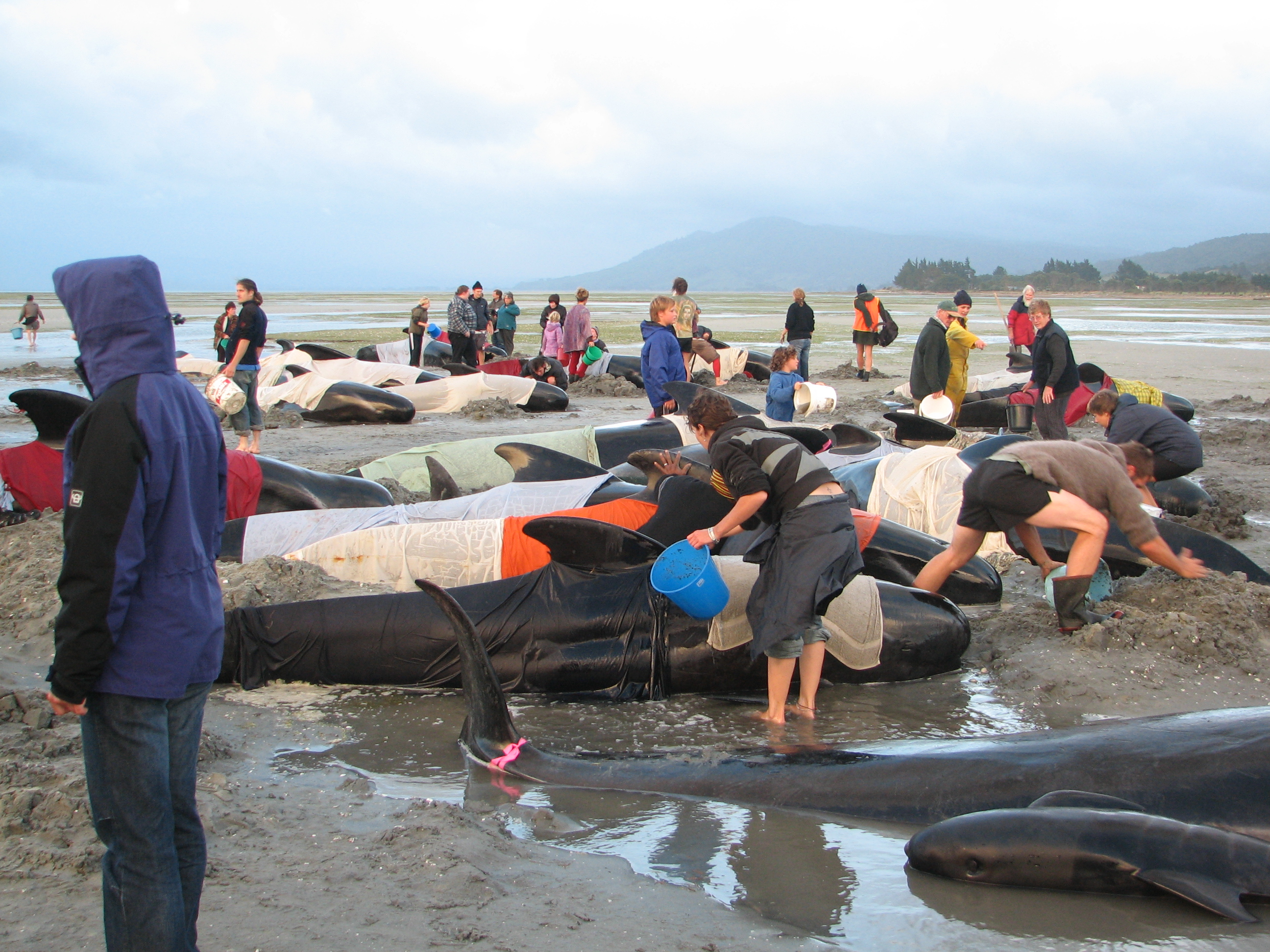
Volunteers attempt to keep body temperatures of beached pilot whales from rising at Farewell Spit in December 2005

Farewell Spit has been the location of many herd strandings of long-finned pilot whales, and has been described as a 'whale trap', because of its protruding coastlines and long, gently sloping beaches.

List of cetacean strandings at Farewell Spit
Year	Month	Number stranded	Species	Notes
1867	June	1	Sperm whale	
1911	March	250	"Blackfish"	
1993	November	90	Pilot whale	
1995	January	30	Pilot whale	
1996	February	34	Pilot whale	
1997	February	5	Sperm whale	
1998	December	28	Pilot whale	
2002	April	4	Pilot whale	
2002	September	1	Pygmy right whale	
2005	December	123	Pilot whale	
2005	December	49	Pilot whale	
2006	January	5	Pilot whale	
2011	February	70	Pilot whale	
2012	January	90	Pilot whale	
2012	November	28	Pilot whale	
2014	January	13	Pilot whale	
2015	February	198	Pilot whale	
2017	February	416	Pilot whale	third-largest stranding on record in NZ
2020	December	1	Sei whale	
2022	February	49	Pilot whale	
2022	March	36	Pilot whale	
2024	December	40	Pilot whale	

== Sources ==
- Petyt, Chris (1999). Farewell Spit : a changing landscape : history and natural history. Takaka, New Zealand: Terracotta Books. ISBN 0473055392.
- Schuckard, Rob; Melville, David S. (2013). Shorebirds of Farewell Spit, Golden Bay and Tasman Bay (PDF). The Ornithological Society of New Zealand – via Nelson Public Library.
- Butler, D.J. (November 2008). Tasman District Biodiversity Overview – Indigenous terrestrial vertebrates and invertebrates (PDF). Tasman District Council. ISBN 978-1-877445-06-4.
