= Bream Islands =

Islands of New Zealand

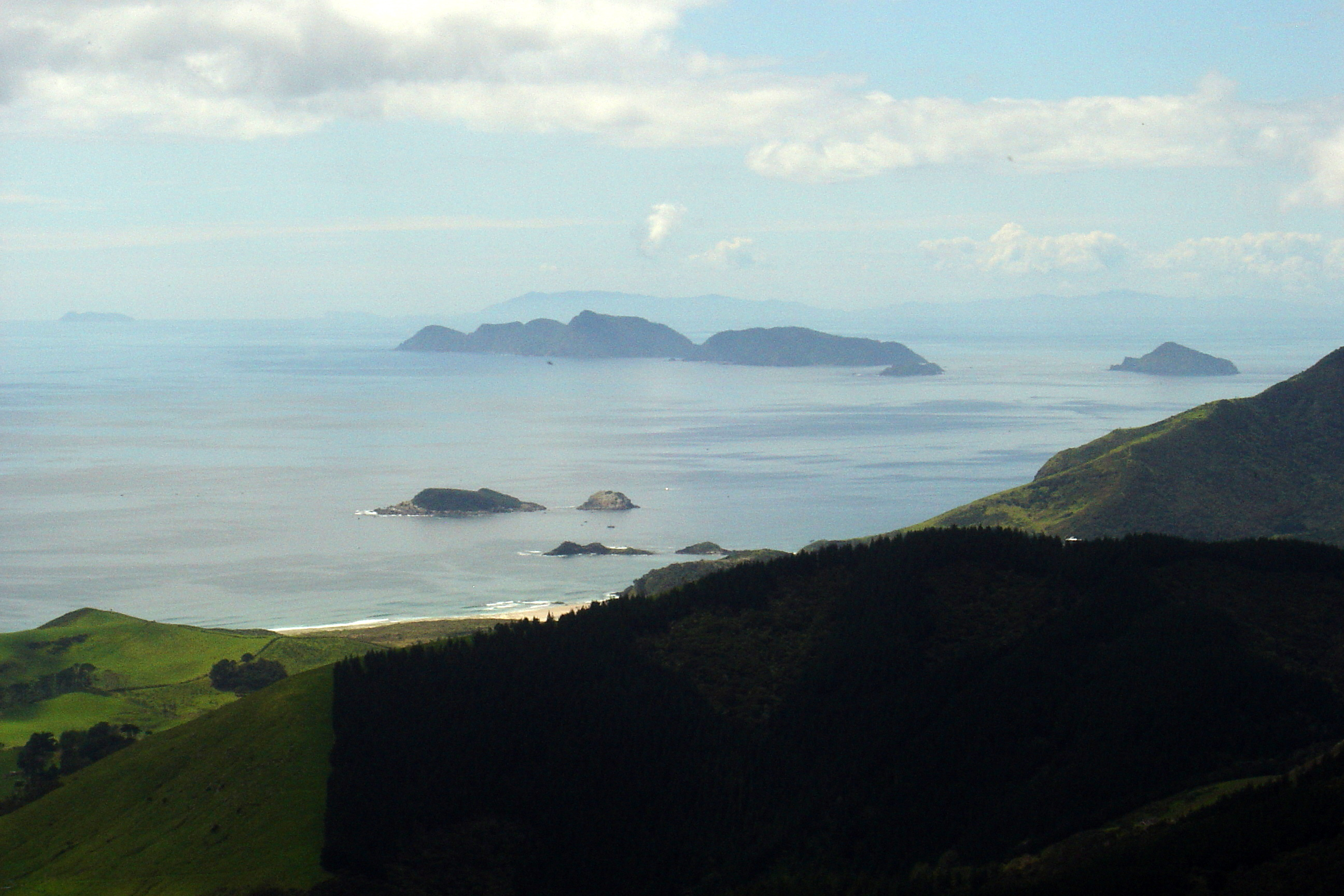

Geography
- Coordinates: 35.838944°S 174.586833°E

Administration
- New Zealand
- Region: Northland

Demographics
- Population: uninhabited

The Bream Islands is a group of five islands off the east coast of the Northland Region, New Zealand. They lie close to the mouth of Whangārei Harbour.

== See also ==
- List of islands of New Zealand
