= Wharariki Beach =

Beach in New Zealand

- Beach
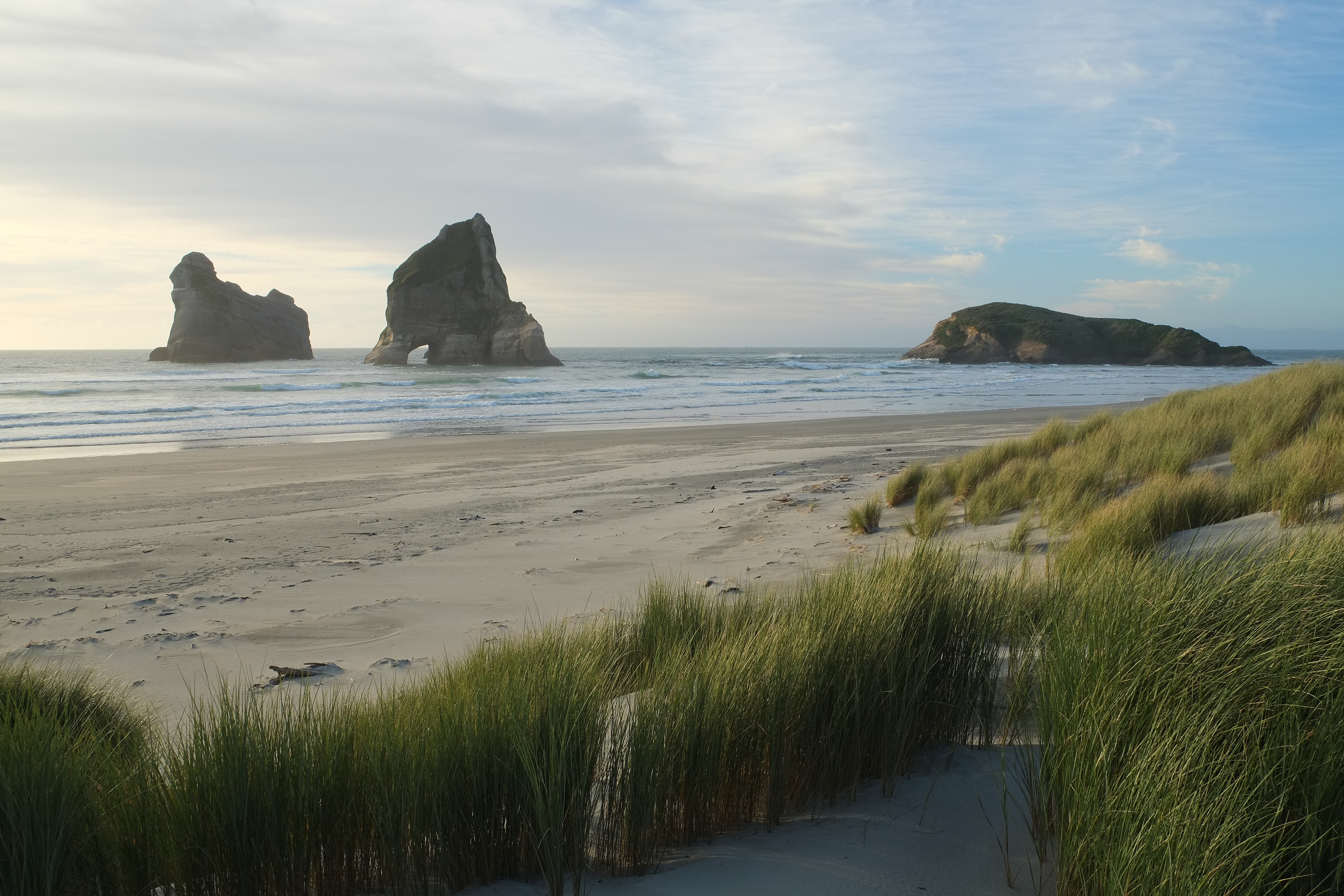
- Wharariki Beach and three of the four Archway Islands

- Location within New Zealand
- Coordinates: 40°30′22″S 172°40′12″E
- Location: Tasman District, New Zealand
- Water bodies: Tasman Sea

Wharariki Beach is a beach on the Tasman Sea, west of Cape Farewell, the northernmost point of the South Island of New Zealand.

== Geography ==
The north-facing sandy beach is accessible only via a 20-minute walking track from the end of Wharariki Road. The road end is approximately 4 kilometres (2.5 mi) from the nearest settlement, the small village of Pūponga. A camping ground is located along Wharariki Road, but the area surrounding the beach is devoid of any development. Wharariki Beach is bordered by Puponga Farm Park, with the wider area more or less surrounded by the northern end of Kahurangi National Park.

The beach is flanked to the east and west by cliffs, but due to the flat topography of the area behind it, the beach area and the grassy dunes behind it are quite exposed to winds.

== Archway Islands ==
Wharariki Beach is perhaps best known for the Archway Islands, a small archipelago of four islands ranging from the beachside (part of the beach at low tide) to roughly 250 metres (820 ft) offshore. The islands are featured frequently in photos in New Zealand landscape calendars.

It is also the default lock screen image on Microsoft's Windows 10 operating system.

== Attractions ==
The beach is popular for its colony of fur seal pups; during low tide, people have access to the pools where pups play in front of the easternmost of the Archway Islands.
