= Cape Farewell, New Zealand =

Headland in New Zealand

Cape Farewell
- Cape
- Coordinates: 40°29′54″S 172°41′01″E
- Location: South Island, New Zealand
- Offshore water bodies: Tasman Sea

Area
  - Total: Oceania

Cape Farewell is a headland in New Zealand, the most northerly point on the South Island. It is located just west of Farewell Spit (Onetahua). First mapped by Abel Tasman based on his encounter in 1642, it was later named by British explorer Captain James Cook during his voyage of exploration in 1770 – it was the last land seen by his crew as they departed the vicinity of New Zealand.

Owing to its remote location it is one of the less visited of New Zealand's major capes. The "Clifftop walk" (2–3 hours one-way along the heights of the coast east of the cape) joins the area with the beginning of Farewell Spit, and has stunning vistas of the Tasman Sea to one side, of the sand dunes in the northeast, and of the towering cliffs and rocky, primal landscapes to the shoreward (east) side.

The cape is flanked to the west by Wharariki Beach and the Archway Islands.

== Geology ==
The cape and its cliffs are composed of Paleocene quartz sandstones. The erosion of the cliffs into fine sand carried on the sea currents creates Farewell Spit further east.

== Ecology ==
In 2020, the Wharariki Ecosanctuary was established in the northernmost 2.5 hectares of the cape, enclosed by a predator-proof fence to protect seabirds, rare native plants, giant snails and geckos.

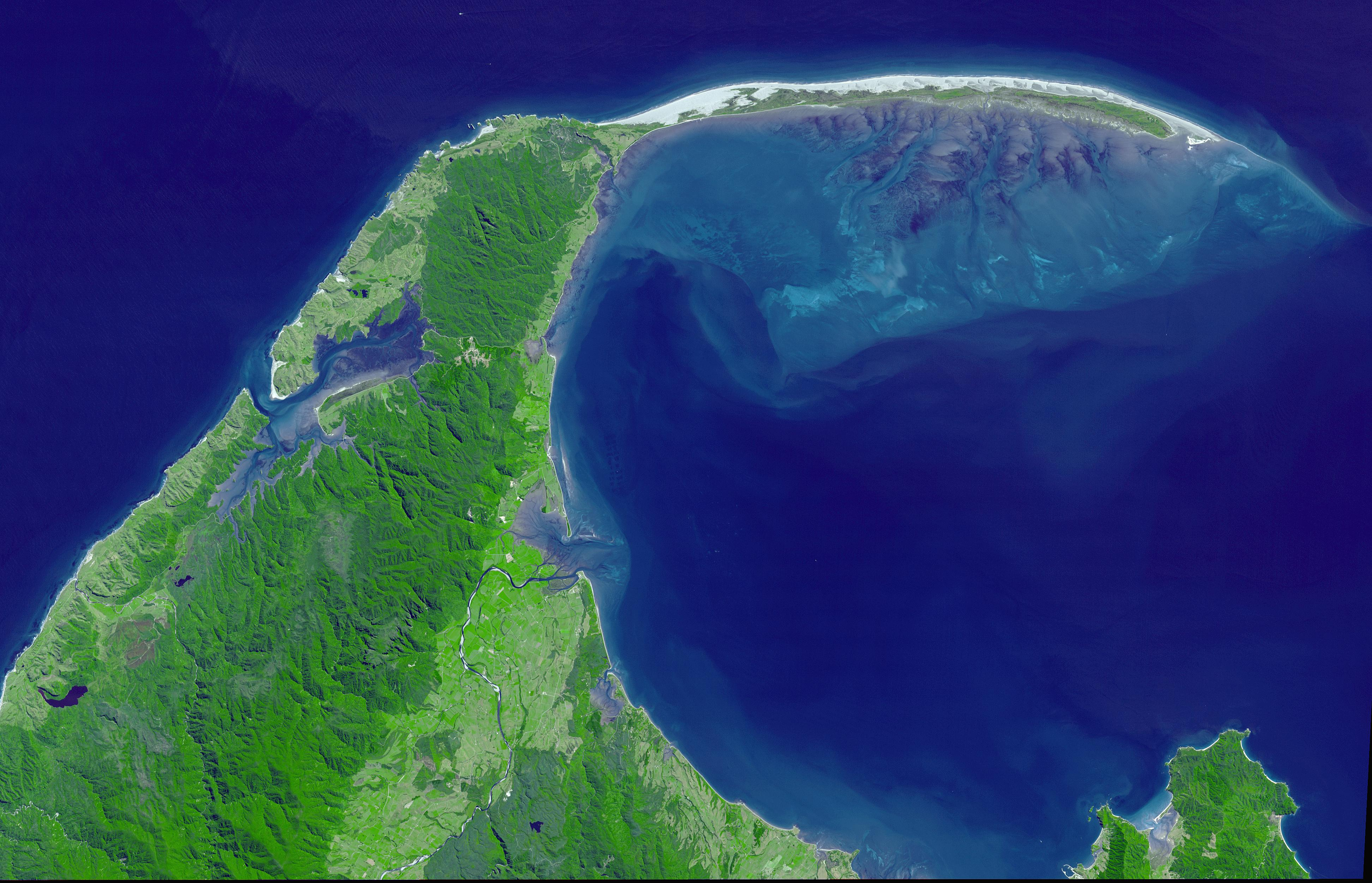
Cape Farewell area satellite image oriented slightly north-north-east. The cape is the topmost land to the west of the sandy spit.

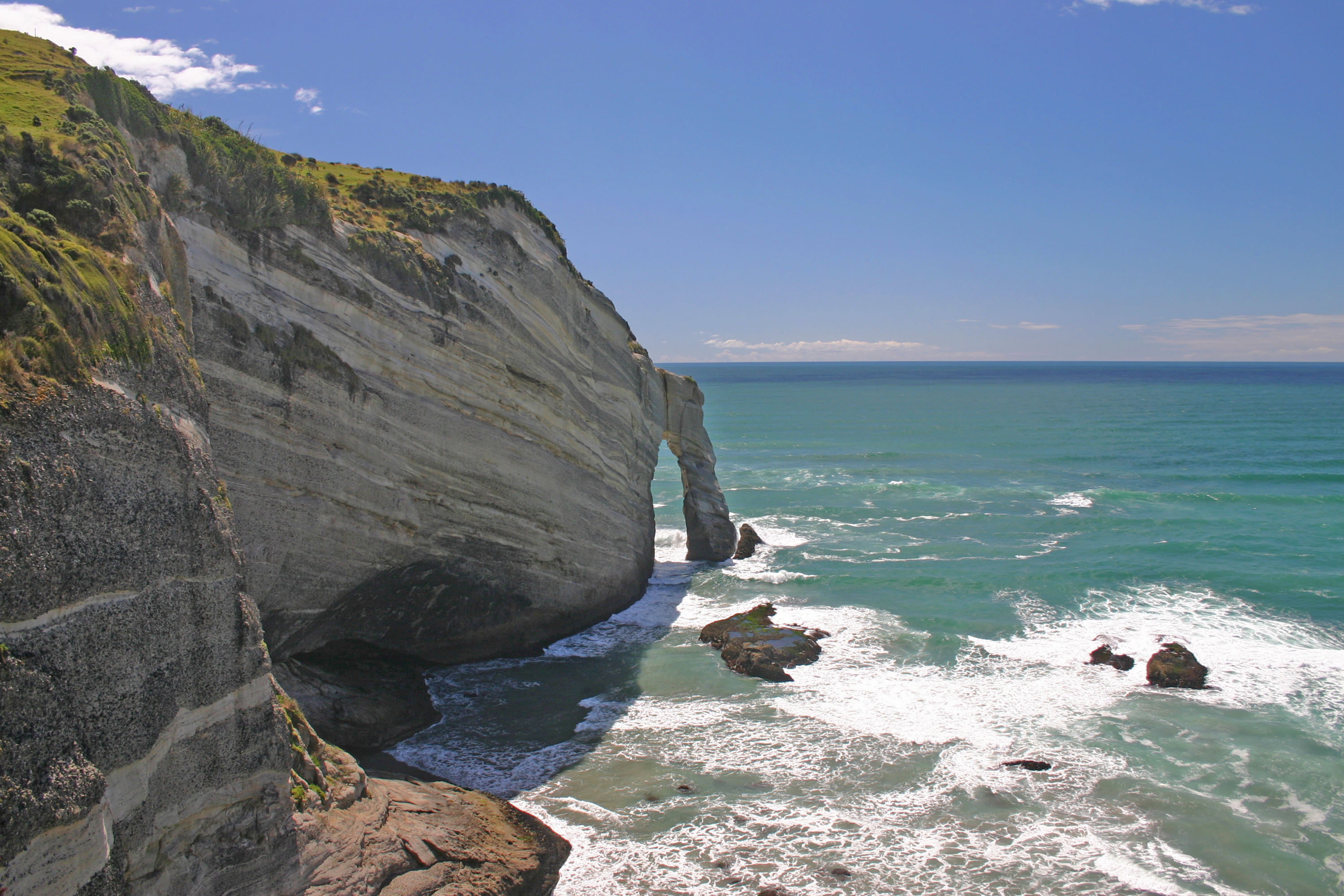
Cape Farewell Arch from viewing platform.
