= Thomas Brunner =

English–born surveyor and explorer

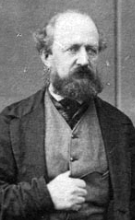
- Born: April 1821; Oxford, England
- Died: 22 April 1874 (aged 52); Nelson, New Zealand
- Occupations: Surveyor; Explorer

Thomas Brunner (April 1821 – 22 April 1874) was an English-born surveyor and explorer remembered for his exploration of the West Coast of New Zealand's South Island.

Brunner was born in April 1821 in Oxford. When he was fifteen, he began to learn architecture and surveying. In 1841, he joined the New Zealand Company in its venture to establish a settlement in the north of the South Island of New Zealand, to be called Nelson. As well as working as an apprentice surveyor and laying sections and roads for the new settlement, he explored the interior, seeking pastoral land for a growing colony. In 1846 he undertook extensive journeys with Charles Heaphy and a Ngāti Tūmatakōkiri tohunga named Kehu towards and along the West Coast.

In December 1846, Brunner commenced an expedition, accompanied by four Māori including Kehu, which began from Nelson. The party travelled down the Buller River and along the West Coast reaching as far south as Tititira Head, near Lake Paringa before returning to Nelson via the Arahura River. This arduous journey, which at one stage saw one of his legs paralysed, took him 550 days. He received honours from the Royal Geographical Society and the Société de Géographie (French Geographic Society). He continued to work as a surveyor and in 1851 was appointed Government Surveyor. He surveyed the sites, which he and Heaphy had scouted on previous explorations, for what would become the towns of Westport and Greymouth. He retired in 1869 and died of a stroke on 22 April 1874.

== Early life ==
Thomas Brunner was born in Oxford, England, in April 1821, and baptised four months later on 22 August. He was the oldest son of William Brunner, an Oxford attorney who was also the county coroner. He was of Swiss descent, his father's parents having emigrated to England at the time of the French Revolution. The Brunner family were active in the Oxford community, Thomas' parents raising him and his siblings to appreciate cultural and charitable activities. In 1836, at the age of fifteen, Brunner was apprenticed to an architect, Thomas Greenshields, to learn architecture and surveying. Over the next five years, he became proficient in both skills.

== Service with the New Zealand Company ==
In 1841, Brunner's father put his son's name forward to the New Zealand Company, which was seeking prospective emigrants for its proposed settlement in the South Island of New Zealand. The company wanted to populate its new settlement with well educated young men of excellent character and with leadership potential. Furthermore, apprentice surveyors, at the time known as "improvers", were in particular demand and Brunner, aided by character references from his employer and other notable residents of Oxford, was duly selected to join the company. In addition to his work as an improver, he was to assist the settlement's principal surveyor, Frederick Tuckett.

Brunner joined a party of six other young improvers which left England on 27 April 1841 aboard the Whitby. During the voyage to New Zealand, the improvers received further instruction and were tested by having to prepare draft layouts for the new settlement, Brunner's plan being the best of these. On 18 September, the Whitby arrived at Port Nicholson, the New Zealand Company's first settlement. The approximate site for the new settlement had yet to be finalised; initially intended for Banks Peninsula, this location was vetoed by the Governor of New Zealand, William Hobson. Instead, it was to be located at the top of the South Island, at Tasman Bay / Te Tai-o-Aorere. Early the following month a convoy of the company's ships, with Brunner aboard one them, crossed the Cook Strait to Tasman Bay. After scouting the area for three weeks, a site adjacent a deep and sheltered natural harbour was identified as being suitable for the settlement.

For the next two years Brunner assisted in the laying out of the settlement, which was to be called Nelson. A drawback with the Nelson settlement was its lack of pasture and the colony began to appropriate more and more of the plains in the nearby Wairau Valley, much to the displeasure of local Māori. Several personnel of the company, including Arthur Wakefield, the senior official of the company in Nelson, were killed in the Wairau Affray in June 1843. The New Zealand Company was forced to look south for more farming land. Brunner was sent to scout the Motueka Valley but failed to penetrate far due to poor weather. From local Māori he heard of a large plain to the south and passed on his findings to Tuckett. In August 1843, Tuckett dispatched Brunner to confirm the reports. Brunner, accompanied by Kehu, (Note: In his writings, Brunner uses the vocative E when referring to Kehu; thus his name is written as Ekehu or E Kehu.) a Māori he had befriended, was again defeated by poor weather.

Life in Nelson was hard for the colonists. The company had limited finances and tightened its expenditure which affected the salaries of its employees. In 1844, it had to halt its operations for a time. Although Nelson had 300 landowners, nearly two-thirds were absentee owners and only 80 actually lived in the town. Brunner lived at Riwaka, a nearby village, and, in addition to carrying out survey work along the Motueka River, helped in the design and building of houses in the area. He ended his service with the company in August 1844.

== Exploring the West Coast ==
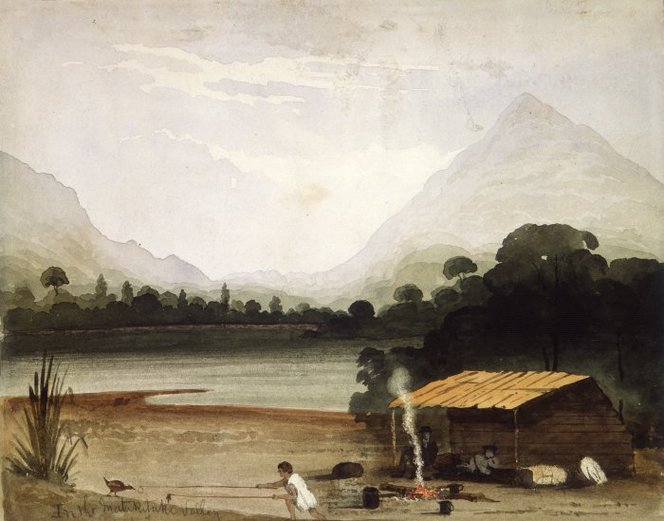
William Fox's painting of a scene from his February 1846 expedition with Brunner and Charles Heaphy. Brunner and Heaphy rest in the front of a crude hut while the expedition's Māori guide, Kehu, snares a weka with a lure of food on a stick and a long pole with a noose

In February 1846, Brunner and Kehu, accompanied by Charles Heaphy and William Fox, undertook an expedition southwest of Nelson. Fox was the resident agent for the New Zealand Company in Nelson and provided the equipment and provisions for the party in addition to paying a salary to Brunner and Heaphy. Land in Nelson for farming was still scarce but it was hoped that beyond the steep hills to the southwest, good pastoral land would be found. Difficult terrain faced them; high mountain ranges topped with snow and ice, steep bush, numerous rivers and gorges. Food sources included roots and berries; birds could be snared and eels caught from streams. Along the coast, shellfish and gull eggs added to the diet.

The party, each carrying a load of 75 pounds (34 kg), (Note: Provisions included 224 pounds (102 kg) of flour, 24 pounds (11 kg) of sugar, 20 pounds (9 kg) of ham, tea, coffee, a bottle of whiskey, a double-barrelled gun and powder, saucepan, axe, tent, clothing and blankets.) trekked to Lake Rotoiti and then climbed the high ranges that backed onto the lake. On 11 February, they saw Lake Rotoroa and made their way to its shores and spent two days exploring the area. They gained the Buller River on 18 February and walked its banks as far as the Maruia River. Here, believing themselves to be only 20 miles (32 km) from the coast, dwindling provisions prevented them proceeding to the mouth of the Buller River. Guided by Kehu, the party traversed the Hope Saddle on their way back to Nelson, which they reached on 1 March.

Brunner was keen for further exploration and Fox persuaded him to scout along the West Coast to the mouth of the Buller River in the hope of finding suitable land for farming. Brunner, Kehu and Heaphy left Nelson on 17 March on what became a five-month expedition tracing the western coast of South Island as far south as what is now known as Hokitika. Their journey began from Golden Bay, and they made their way to West Wanganui where Brunner hired a local Māori, Etau, as a porter for the party. The expedition hit a snag when the local chief barred their journey south but Brunner and Heaphy mollified him with some tobacco. They continued along the coast, climbing sometimes steep cliffs and fording rivers as they went. Their movements would be held up at times due to rain and high tides. At night, they would shelter in small caves augmented with a screen of Nīkau palm leaves. They crossed the Karamea River on 20 April and reached the Buller River ten days later. This had to be crossed using an old canoe that was repaired by Kehu and Etau. After safely getting across, they stayed at the local pā (village). In early May, they sighted the Southern Alps. At the Arahura River (a tributary of the Grey River), the southernmost point of the expedition, they were hosted by the local Ngāi Tahu tribe at Taramakau Pā. Poor weather plagued their return trip back along the coast but they reached Nelson on 18 August.

=== The Great Journey ===
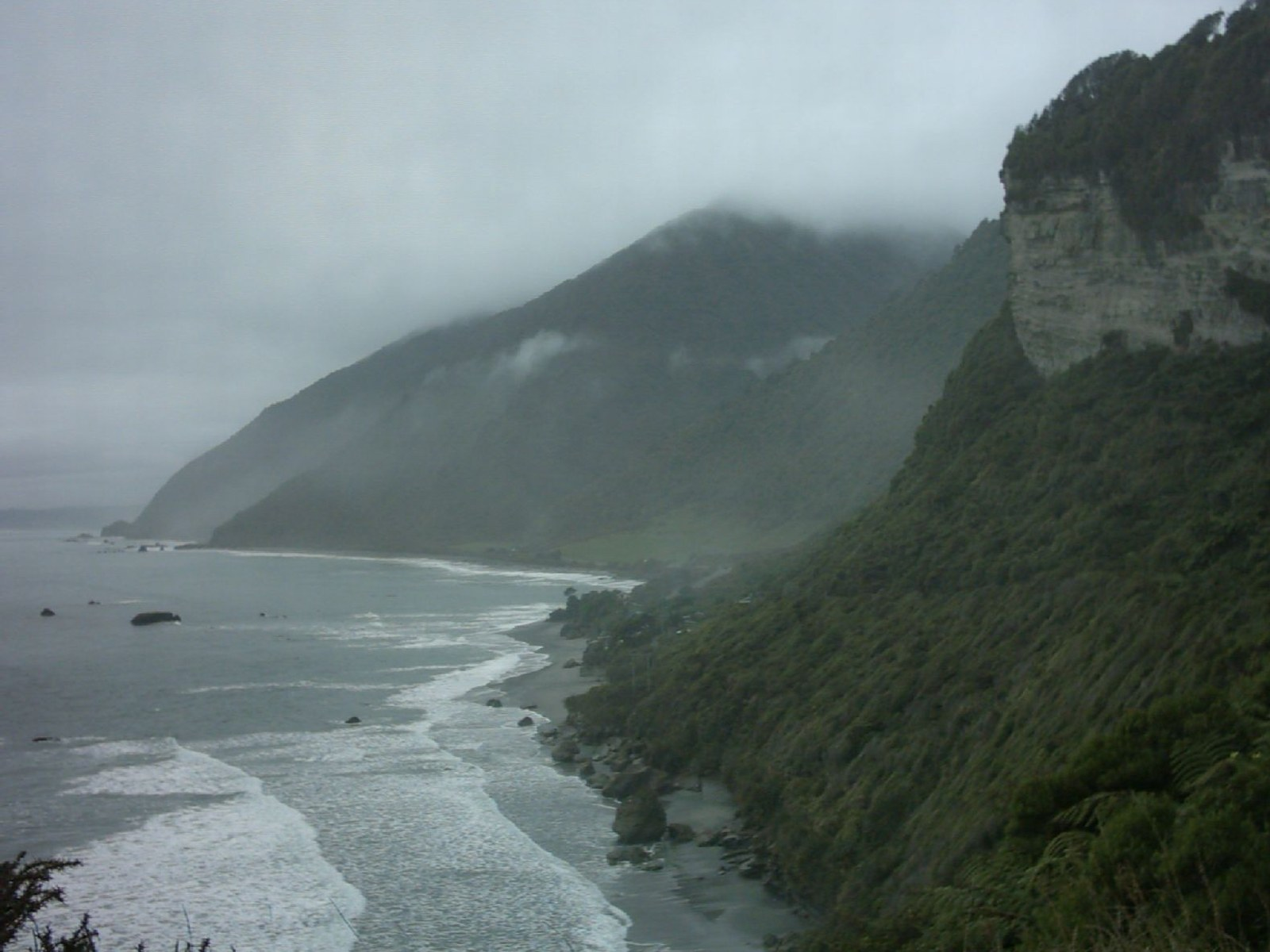
A view of a section of the West Coast, and typical of the terrain (and weather) encountered by Brunner and his companions during their journey

On 3 December 1846, Brunner began what became his longest and most arduous expedition. He planned to follow the Buller River to the sea and then trek down the West Coast as far south as Milford Sound. During his previous expedition, he had been told of the existence of a route through the Southern Alps by the Māori at the Arahura River. He hoped to discover this route and use it to cross the Southern Alps and reach Canterbury. He was accompanied once again by Kehu, who brought along his wife. Another Māori, Pitewate, a friend of Kehu's, also joined the venture, accompanied by his wife. Brunner provided clothing and shoes for his companions. The wives proved problematic during the journey as they quarrelled, sometimes supported by their husbands, and Brunner would have to mediate.

Stocked with provisions that included two guns, 16 pounds (7 kg) of tobacco, 112 pounds (51 kg) of flour, salt and pepper, biscuits and tea, the party travelled by mules and canoe for the first two weeks until they reached Buller River. They then followed the path of the river down to the coast. The journey was difficult; the party was constantly bothered by sandflies and rain and they had to ford the river several times. They settled into a routine of trekking for a week then camping for the same period to restock their provisions, living off freshwater fish and cabbage- and fern-tree roots. By May 1847, they were at the final reaches of the Buller but food was becoming so scarce to find, they had to kill Brunner's dog. He noted its flesh was "... something between mutton and pork. It is too richly flavoured to eat by itself." This incident led to him being nicknamed Kai Kuri (dog eater).

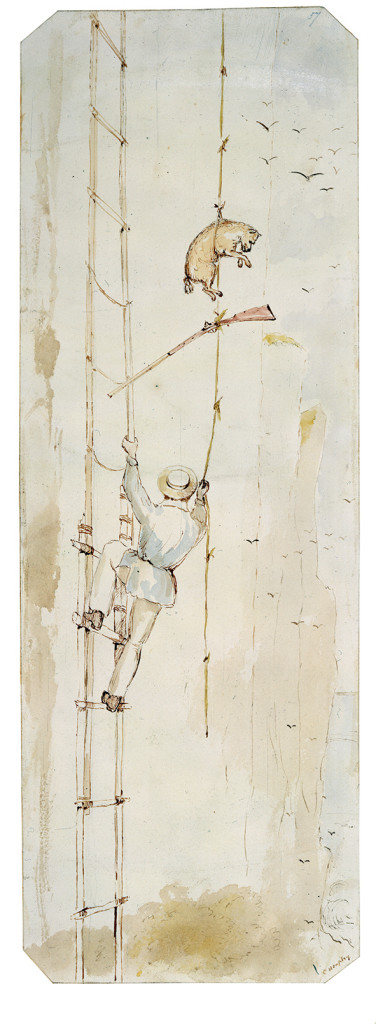
A sketch by Heaphy of Brunner ascending the cliffs at Te Miko, north of Punakaiki, with the dog Rover being raised by a flax rope.

Brunner was disappointed at the condition of the land along the banks of the Buller River as it neared the coast. He had briefly scouted the area on his previous journey and believed it had potential for pastoral farming. He now found it too damp and mossy to be cultivated. The party reached the mouth of the Buller on 1 June and made their way to the pā that Brunner and Heaphy had stayed at on their last journey but on arrival, found that it had been abandoned. They continued on down to the Arahura River and reached the Taramakau Pā where they stayed for three months over the worst of the winter months. On 12 October, Brunner continued south with some local Māori. He went as far south as Tititira Head, near Lake Paringa where in December he severely sprained his ankle. After recovering, he decided to make his way back to Taramakau Pā. From here he along with his companions, journeyed up the Arahura River and in late January 1848, discovered the coalfield and lake which now bears his name. He wanted to continue on this route to Canterbury but Kehu and Pitewate would have none of it. The party began to make their way back to Nelson.

They travelled north via a tributary of the Arahura River which eventually met the Buller River, which they reached in March. In April, while making his way up the Buller Gorge, Brunner suffered paralysis of his leg. The party had to lay up for a week for Brunner to recover some use of his body. With the aid of Kehu (Pitewate and his wife abandoned the party when Brunner became ill), he was able to reach Nelson in June 1848, thus ending after 550 days what he described as his 'Great Journey'.

In Nelson, many people had thought Brunner dead and he readily recognised that he would not have survived his endeavours without the aid of Kehu, writing: "... I found my native Ekehu of much use – invaluable indeed, but the other three rather an encumbrance – I could have made better progress without them; but to Ekehu I owe my life – he is a faithful and attached servant." (Note: The 7,250 feet (2,210 m) Kehu Peak in the Travers Range, which overlooks Lake Rotoiti, is named for Kehu.) As well as further information about the West Coast, Brunner informed the colony that coal was to be found in the Grey River valley. However, he also considered, mistakenly, that "there is nothing on the West Coast worth incurring the expense of exploring."

Reports of Brunner's endeavours on the West Coast soon spread to Wellington and England. He wrote an account of his journey which was first published by Charles Elliott, the editor of the local newspaper the Nelson Examiner, and later, in 1850, in the Journal of the Royal Geographical Society. The same year, the Royal Geographical Society awarded Brunner a 25 guinea prize for 'his explorations of the Middle Island of New Zealand' and appointed him a Fellow of the Society. His exploits were also recognised in France, the Société de Géographie (French Geographic Society) awarding him a diploma in 1852.

== Later life ==
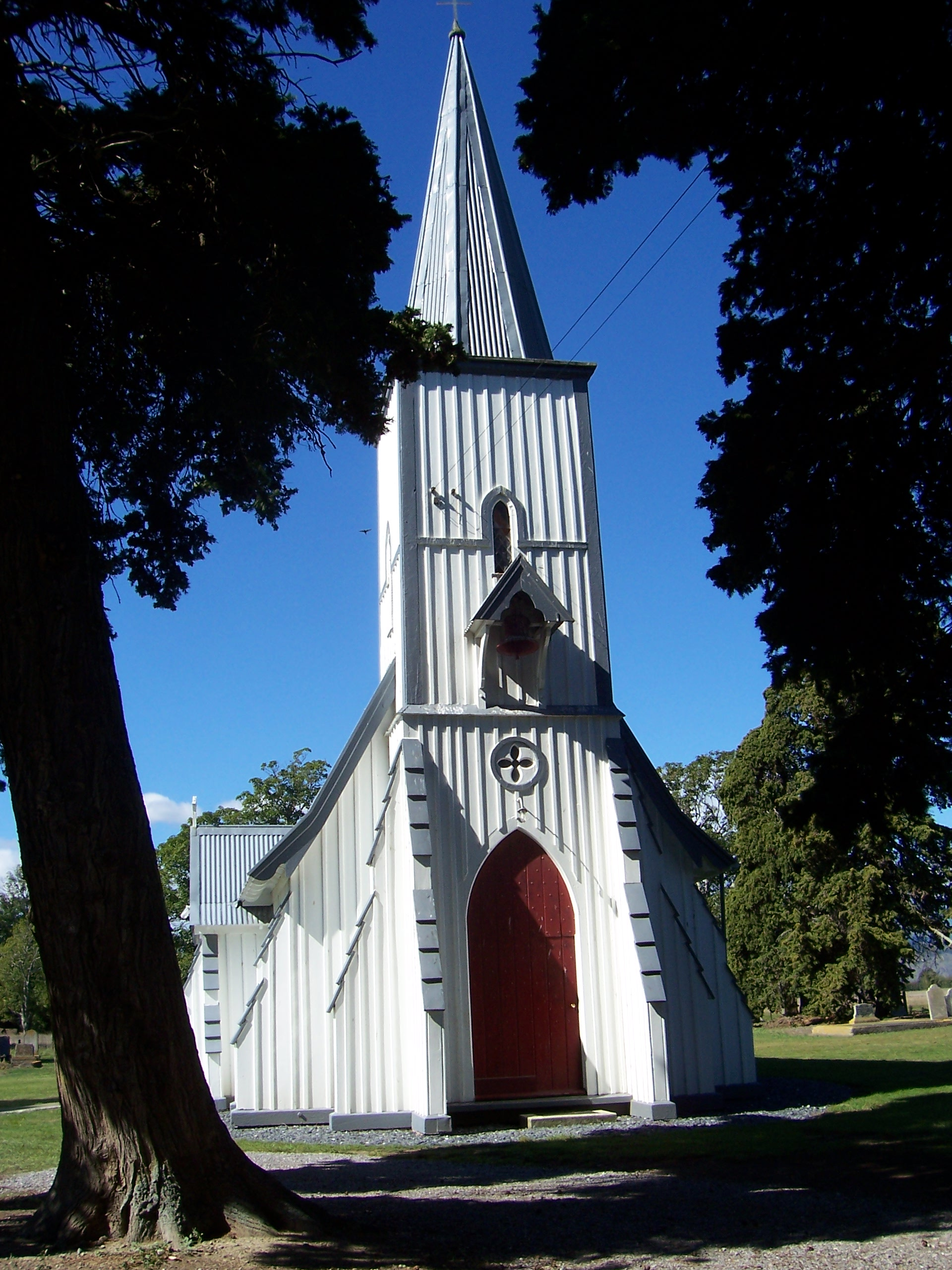
St Michael's Church in Waimea West was designed by Brunner in 1866

Brunner's constitution was considerably impaired by his exertions and his health never fully returned. Despite this, after a period of recovery he set out in November 1848 with three companions, including Kehu, to discover a quicker route between Nelson and Wairau. This involved travelling the paths of the Maitai and Wairoa Rivers to their headwaters. The weather was poor throughout the six-week trip and Brunner was in discomfort for much of the ultimately unsuccessful venture, which determined that the existing route to Wairau was the fastest.

Apart from a short period doing contract surveying for the New Zealand Company in March 1849, Brunner remained unemployed and wrote numerous letters to his contacts. His former travelling companion, William Fox, (Note: Many of Brunner's social circle in Nelson moved to Wellington where they became prominent members of society there. Fox, for example, became Premier of New Zealand.) and Dillon Bell, chief agent of the New Zealand Company, also sought to find him a job and through them, he was able to find work as a clerk with the Canterbury Association between September 1849 and February 1850. He returned to Nelson in May 1850 and secured full-time employment as a surveyor with the New Zealand Company, but with the proviso that he would be able to take on private work which did not interfere with his duties. To supplement his income Brunner began to take on architectural commissions.

In 1851, the New Zealand Company was still struggling financially and eventually transferred its land to the New Zealand Government. Brunner's employment with the company ceased and he, after writing a letter soliciting for surveying work, was appointed the Government Surveyor with an annual salary of £100 (2014 approximation £8,000). This was still a low salary for a professional and Brunner was allowed to continue with his architectural commissions, working from an office he had purchased in Nelson. He was kept busy for the next several years; in addition to carrying out and supervising survey work in the area, he took on responsibility for some public works. He drew up plans for roading, bridges and botanical gardens.

On 11 October 1855, Brunner married Jane Robson, the 26-year-old daughter (Note: On her death in 1895, her age was given as 74 and this would have made her 33 at the time of her marriage to Brunner. As this was old enough to be considered a spinster by the standards of the day, she may have held herself out to be younger to improve her chances of marriage.) of a labourer who had brought his family to New Zealand the previous year. It was a respectable match for Jane as Brunner was considered a particularly eligible bachelor in Nelson, one of around 45 professionals working in the town of about 1600 people. His salary had increased to £300 (£24,000) and he was now Chief Surveyor for the Nelson Province, the local returning officer and the Commissioner of Native Reserves for Nelson. He also owned three properties, including his Nelson office.

Brunner returned to the mouth of the Buller River in March 1861 but this time aboard a ship. Working in much greater comfort than on his last visit to the area in 1848, with other members of his staff he surveyed and laid out sections for what would become the town of Westport. Later that month he did the same for Greymouth. The work was soon completed and the party returned to Nelson in April 1861.

Brunner designed St Michael's Church in Waimea West in 1866, which was probably New Zealand's first memorial church. It commemorates Captain Francis H. Blundell, an early settler who died in 1865 and is buried here. The previous church on the site from 1843 was the first church in the Nelson Province. On 5 April 1984, St Michael's was registered with the New Zealand Historic Places Trust (now Heritage New Zealand) as a Category I structure with registration number 248.

== Retirement and death ==
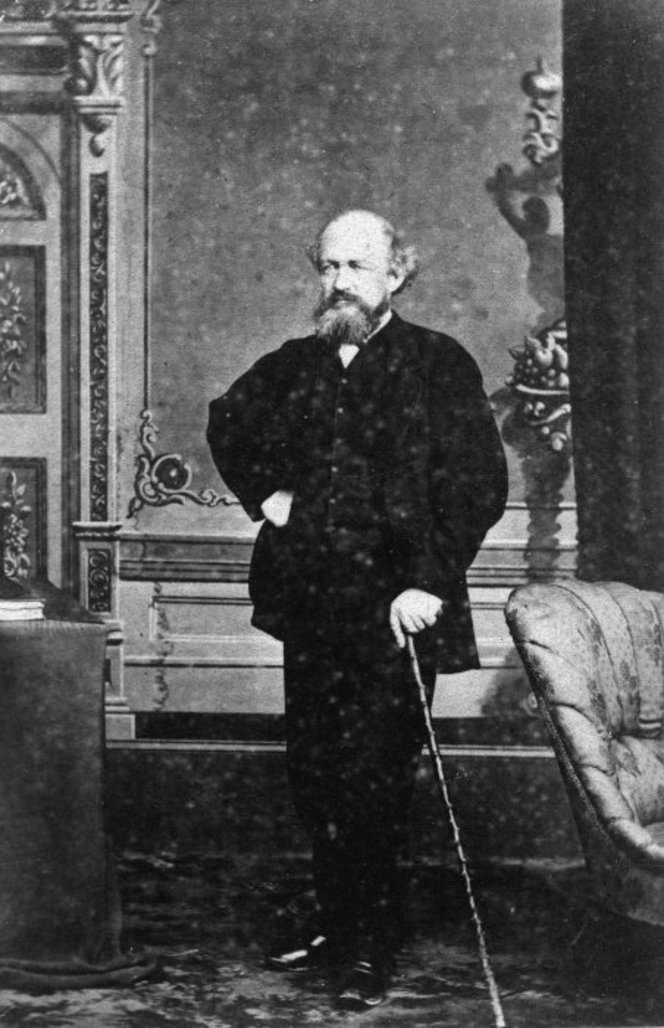
Thomas Brunner in 1871

Brunner retired in 1869 at the relatively young age of 46. He remained employed by the Nelson Provincial Council as a consultant surveyor and was also head of the Nelson Survey Department. His administration skills were not up to the latter role and many of the surveys produced under his supervision were of poor quality. He also continued to seek private work, and one commission was the design of St Cuthbert's Church at Collingwood. He also contributed to a report on the suitability of the Buller region for settlement and this was published in early 1873. On his retirement in 1869 he had retained his offices of sheriff, returning officer and registration officer but was relieved of these in 1872 in cost-cutting measures by the Nelson Provincial Council. This did not meet with the approval of locals.

In late 1873, Brunner suffered a paralysis of his left side which prevented him from working. By mid-April 1874, he had sufficiently recovered to begin soliciting the provincial government for suitable employment. However, on the morning of 22 April he suffered a stroke and died few hours later. His funeral service was held at Nelson Cathedral and was attended by several hundred people. A large Māori contingent, including his long-time friend Kehu, was also present. Brunner was buried at Wakapuaka Cemetery. He was survived by his wife, who moved to England soon after his death. She lived with her brother until her death in 1895. The couple had no children.

== Honorific eponyms and memorials ==
Several geographic features are named for him. Brunner, originally called Brunnerton, is a small settlement on the Grey River inland from Greymouth where he first found coal. It is the site of the former Brunner Mine, best known for New Zealand's worst mine disaster in 1896. Lake Brunner is located some 16 miles (26 km) by road from here, upstream along the Arnold River; Brunner went there after his coal discovery. Another feature named for him is the Brunner Range, which is located east of the valley through which the Inangahua River flows. Brunner Peninsula extends into Lake Rotoiti at Saint Arnaud. A plaque to his memory lies in the Nelson Cathedral and another is mounted onto a memorial stone in the Buller Gorge adjacent to State Highway 6.

== Notes ==
Footnotes

Citations
