= History of the Nelson Region, New Zealand =

The history of the Nelson Region of New Zealand dates back to settlement by the Māori people in about the 12th century. The Nelson and Marlborough Region were known to the Māori as Te Tau Ihu o Te Waka a Maui which means "The Prow of the Canoe of Maui".

== Archaic Māori period ==
The precise date at which the first inhabitants of New Zealand reached the Nelson Region remains uncertain, nevertheless it is generally agreed that Māori tribes have inhabited the upper South Island for up to eight hundred years. The first known tribes were the Waitaha, Rapuwai, Hāwea, Ngāti Wairangi, and Kāti Māmoe. The Ngāti Kuia entered the Pelorus Sound / Te Hoiere and eventually evicted the Ngāi Tara tribe from the Marlborough Region and the tribe were forced to relocate to Waimea. Subsequently, another tribe, the Ngāti Tūmatakōkiri (originally from Taupō) invaded the Nelson region during the early 17th century and displaced the Ngāi Tara tribe that had moved to Waimea.

== European exploration ==
After the first sighting of New Zealand by the Dutch explorer Abel Tasman on 13 December 1642, the ship Heemskerck sailed into Golden Bay by 18 December 1642. The Ngāti Tūmatakōkiri sent two waka (Māori canoes) in their customary ritual to challenge and frighten the unknown ships that entered their territory. The Dutch sailors blew their trumpet to warn the waka not to approach their ship in such a hostile manner as to endanger the safety of the crew. This was ignored by the Māori and the Dutch subsequently ordered cannon to be fired upon the approaching waka. The Māori flew into a rage and the next day seven waka were dispatched to ram into the Heemskerck, resulting in four Dutchmen killed in the ensuing conflict. The waka then paddled back to shore. As the Dutch were dropping in their anchor near the coast, eleven waka suddenly approached the Heemskerck, however, this time the crew on the warship Zeehaen quickly fired upon the waka and the Māori returned to shore with one casualty. Hence the Dutch named the Bay as "Moordenaers Baaij" (Murderer's Bay). As a result of hostility from the inhabitants of the area, the Dutch did not land ashore and headed to the North Island after sailing near parts of the Cook Strait.

In January 1770, Captain James Cook explored the Nelson region and named the sea between the North and South Island as "Cook Strait". They landed at Queen Charlotte Sound and Ship Cove in the Marlborough Sounds, the names of both places being given by the British explorer. There, they spent several weeks repairing their ship The Endeavour and reloading food and water supplies. Captain Cook and his crew were to enter Ship Cove in their subsequent voyages to New Zealand in 1773 and 1777.

On 22 January 1827, the French explorer Jules Dumont d'Urville along with French crew on the ship Astrolabe entered the Tasman Bay / Te Tai-o-Aorere into what is now known as French Pass and D'Urville Island. The crew found safe anchorage near the Farewell Spit and painted the nearby scenery. The crew refilled their provisions and traded with local Māori. D'Urville himself also had some knowledge of the Māori language and was able to communicate with the local inhabitants. In 1838, Captain Jean Francois Langlois of the whaling ship Cachalot embarked on a scheme to establish a French colony at Akaroa. He was also instructed by members of the French Government, "You should also win over the chief Te Rauparaha and induce him to sell the lands under his control in the northern part of the South Island. There is great advantage in setting up establishments in various parts of the Island for acquisitions [of territory] will only go unchallenged where there is effective act of possession." The French plan was to place sufficient French settlers in the South Island to convince the British to give up on any ambitions to annex the South Island. In February 1840 the ship L’Aube departed from France to aid the first French settlers. However the British, after the signing of the Treaty of Waitangi in the North Island, proceeded in May 1840 with the Treaty documents to Akaroa where Ngāi Tahu chiefs signed the Treaty. The British subsequently claimed possession of the entire South Island.

== New Māori invasions (late 18th century) ==
By the late 18th century, the Ngāti Tūmatakōkiri faced a new threat from the Ngāti Apa tribe whom launched frequent waka canoe attacks on the Nelson region from their home base in the Kāpiti Coast of the lower North Island. The Ngāti Tūmatakōkiri were simultaneously harassed by the Ngāti Kuia tribe that resided in the Marlborough region to the east. The reasons for these intrusions was for the securing of greenstone trail of which the various tribes needed to cross Ngāti Tūmatakōkiri-controlled land in order to reach the greenstone deposits of the West Coast of the South Island. Conflicts between the Ngāti Tūmatakōkiri and Ngāi Tahu of the Canterbury area was also sparked after some Ngāi Tahu people were killed by Ngāti Tūmatakōkiri. The Ngāti Tūmatakōkiri planned a massive wave of canoe attacks on the Ngāti Apa home base at Kāpiti Coast with the intention to occupy Kapiti Island. However, unfavourable winds resulted in several canoes capsizing and the survivors were finished off by their enemies by the time they reached the shores of Kapiti Island. This left Ngāti Tūmatakōkiri vulnerable to reprisal attacks from all three neighbouring tribes and their controlled land was gradually wrested from them.

== Great Tainui–Taranaki invasion (1820s) ==
During the mid to late 1820s, the northern South Island was invaded by the forces of Te Rauparaha who was originally from Kawhia. The Kawhia tribes had been at war against the Waikato and Ngāti Maniapoto tribes. Due to the ability of the Waikato tribes to obtain muskets from European traders at the Manukau area, the Kawhia tribes were outgunned battle after battle and during a desperate siege by the Waikato-Maniapoto tribal alliance, negotiations commenced between both sides and the Kawhia tribes were given the option to either face defeat and annihilation by the victors or to permanently vacate their homes at Kawhia and relocate southwards to settle. The latter option was chosen and a great migration occurred during 1821. They initially moved with their families to the tribes of the Northern Taranaki region who were allied to them. Te Rauparaha then initiated a campaign of conquest and occupation of the regions stretching from South Taranaki to Wanganui, Manawatū and the present day Wellington Region. Despite resistance from the tribes in those areas, they were overpowered by Te Rauparaha's forces whom had obtained muskets from European traders. The remnants of the Ngāti Apa fled to the northern South Island where, under the leadership of Te Rato, they would plan frequent raids into the lower North Island to inflict casualties on tribal settlements allied to Te Rauparaha. Te Rauparaha and tribes allied to him launched several campaigns into the Nelson and Marlborough region to remove the Ngāti Apa resistance fighters and also conquer the areas. The invasion was also due to the insult from a Marlborough chief who pledged to smash Te Rauparaha's head with a patu aruhe (fernroot pounder) if he were to cross Te Moana Raukawa (Cook Strait). The Kaikōura chief also pledged to slit open Te Rauparaha's belly with a shark tooth if he entered Kaikōura. One by one, the wooden pā fortifications of Ngāti Kuia fell to the incoming invaders and the survivors fled to the hills whilst others submitted and made peace with the invaders. Te Rauparaha's forces then split into two with one group heading westwards towards Nelson and the Tasman region while the other group led by Te Rauparaha himself raided the eastern coast of the South Island as far as Kaikōura. The Kaikōura chief was defeated and executed by Te Rauparaha.

== British colonisation and the Wairau Affray ==
The New Zealand Company founded by Edward Gibbon Wakefield had founded a settlement at Wellington. Since they needed more arable land for settlement, they sent three ships in May 1841 to find a suitable location to establish a new settlement named Nelson in the upper South Island. New Zealand Company representatives commenced negotiations with Te Rauparaha at Kāpiti to purchase land at present day Nelson. Te Rauparaha consented and the first ship carrying settlers arrived on 1 November 1841. Within two years, 2,000 settlers had reached Nelson.

The New Zealand Company later discovered that they needed an extra seventy-thousand acres in order to accommodate all the settlers and dispatched surveyors to survey the fertile Wairau valley. The Ngāti Toa claimed that the Wairau valley was not included in their land sales but the New Zealand Company ignored their objections. Te Rauparaha then requested to the Land Commissioner William Spain that the surveyors be removed from the Wairau area. However, before William Spain had arrived to hear the case, the New Zealand Company surveyors continued their surveying. Te Rauparaha and his men then carried out acts of obstruction such as the removal of surveying equipment and the burning of huts. The New Zealand Company charged Te Rauparaha for arson, arguing that the upper South Island had been obtained by Ngāti Toa through conquest and therefore the land did not belong to him in the first place, then sent an armed group to arrest and hand-cuff Te Rauparaha. Te Rangihaeata insisted the land was theirs. A gun that was fired by someone by accident then resulted in a gunfight that led to eleven settlers and two Māori killed.

The Wairau Affray resulted in the residents of Nelson forming the Nelson Battalion of Militia and constructing a fortification known as Fort Arthur on Church Hill.

== Timeline ==
- 1642: The Dutch explorer Abel Tasman in the ship Heemskerck sails into Golden Bay.
- 1770: Captain James Cook explores the Nelson region and names the sea between the North and South Island as "Cook Strait".
- 1827: The French explorer Dumont d'Urville along with French crew on the ship Astrolabe enter Tasman Bay / Te Tai-o-Aorere.
- 1841: The first immigrant ships of the New Zealand Company arrive in Nelson.
- 1843: A serious clash of arms between Māori and the British settlers, known as the Wairau Affray occurs at Tuamarina.
- 1845: Nelson Battalion of Militia formed as the first military unit in the South Island.
- 1848: Local Nelson firm, Morrison and Sclanders, began to issue their own one pound notes under the name of the so-called Nelson Bank.
- 1853: The Nelson Province constituted under the New Zealand Constitution Act 1852.
- 1858: Nelson is proclaimed a Bishop's See and city under letters patent by Queen Victoria.
- 1859: Settlers of the Wairau District vote to form the Marlborough Province.
- 1860: During the First Taranaki War nearly 1,200 Taranaki refugees including women and children are relocated to Nelson.
- 1876: The Nelson Province is abolished under the Counties Bill of 1876.
- 1892: The New Zealand Church Mission Society (NZCMS) was formed in a Nelson church hall.
- 1901: 1st Regiment, Nelson Mounted Rifles formed in Nelson.
- 1941: Nelson military units begin mobilisation for war as part of the 11th Brigade Group, 5th Division.
- 1958: Nelson City obtains a Coat of Arms from the Royal College of Heralds to mark the Centenary of Nelson as a City.
- 1965: Construction of Christ Church Cathedral is completed.

== See also ==
- History of Canterbury Region
- History of Otago
- History of Auckland
