= Canterbury Association =

English colonial venture in New Zealand (1848–55)

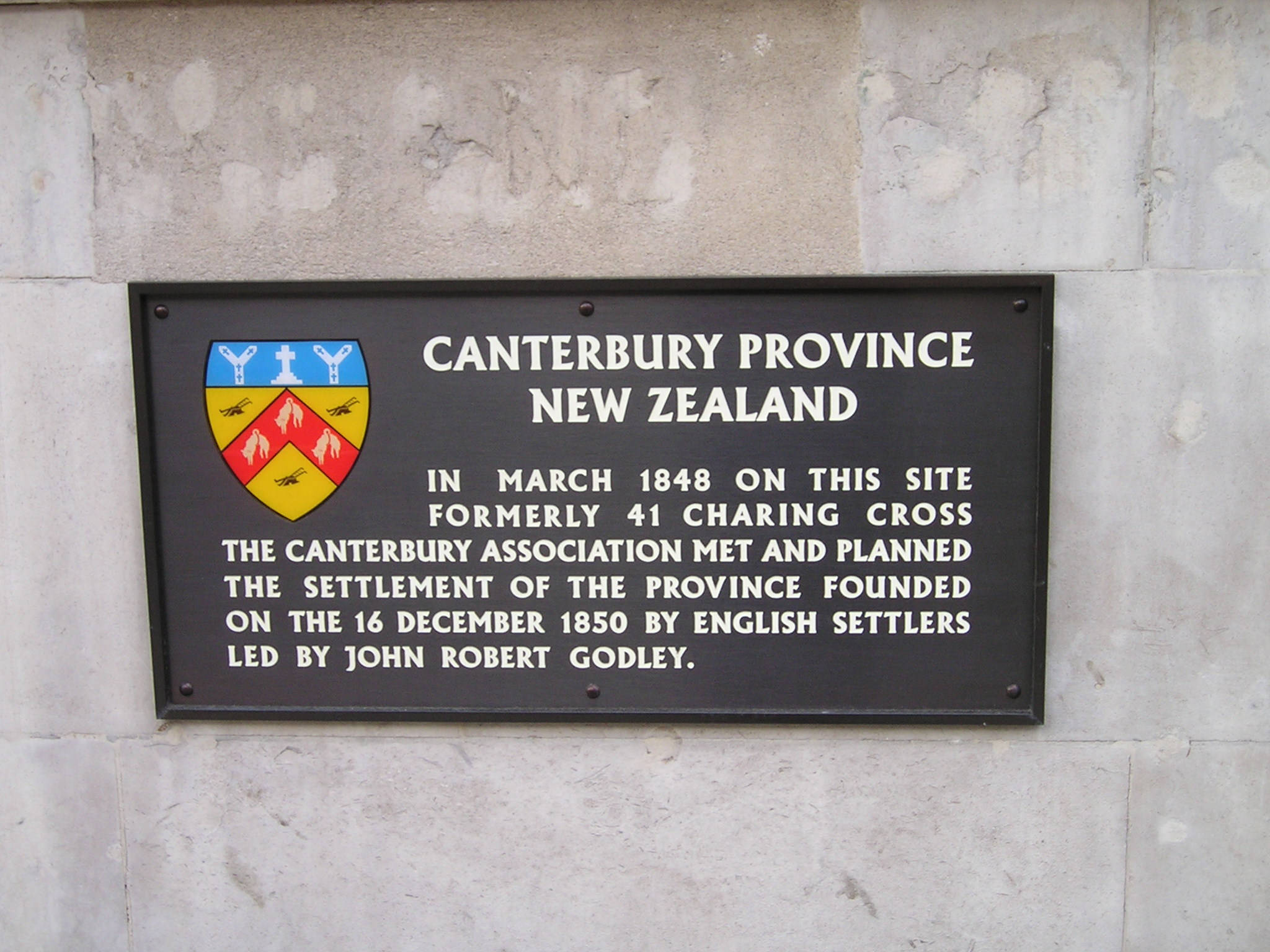
Plaque at 22 Whitehall, London, commemorating the first meeting of the Canterbury Association

The Canterbury Association was formed in 1848 in England by members of parliament, peers, and Anglican church leaders, to establish a colony in New Zealand. The settlement was to be called Canterbury, with its capital to be known as Christchurch. Organised emigration started in 1850 and the colony was established on the South Island. The First Four Ships took out approximately 750 settlers. The Association was not a financial success for the founding members and the organisation was wound up in 1855.

== Formation of the Association ==
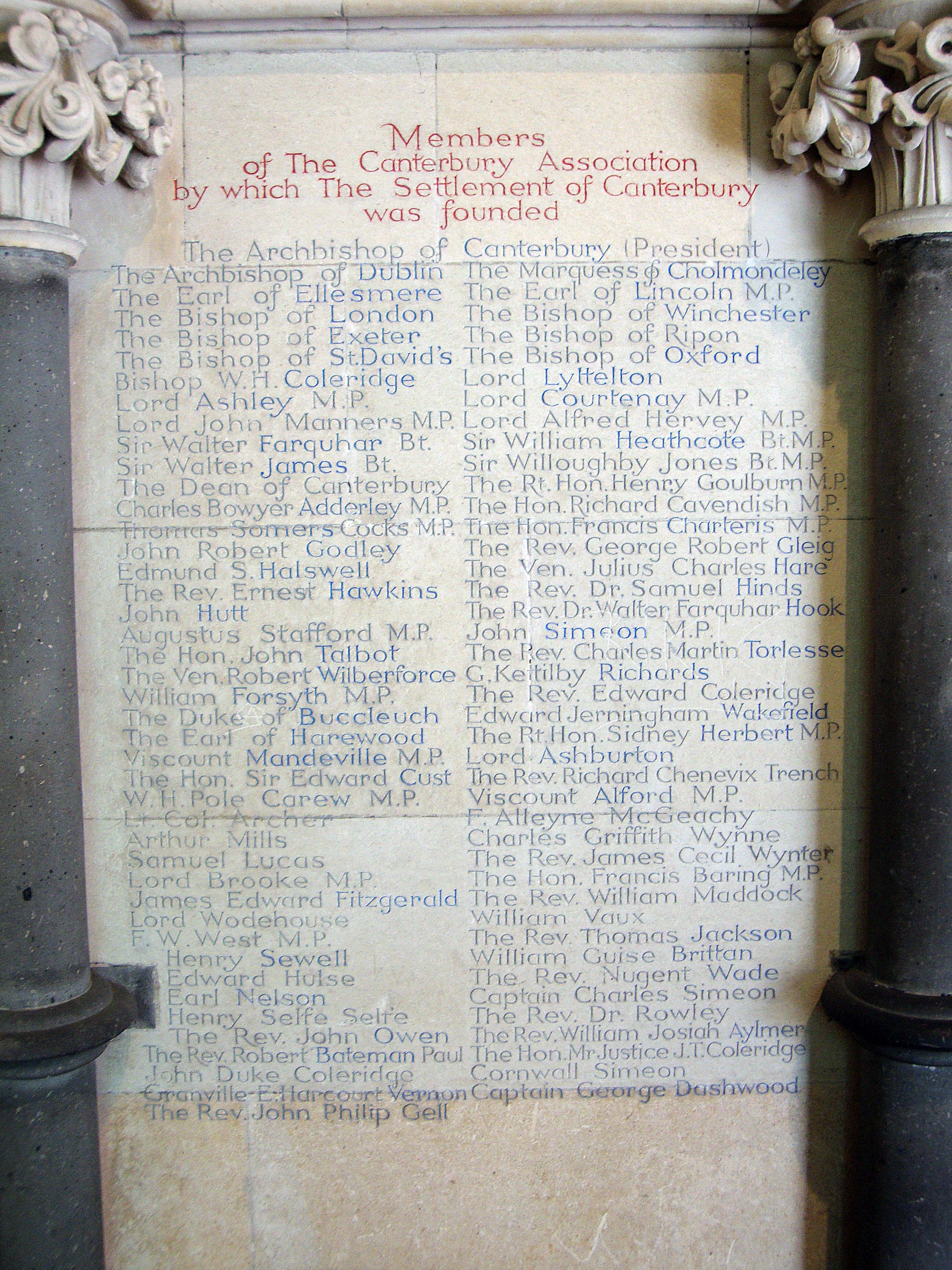
Memorial tablet inside Christ Church Cathedral, Christchurch, showing the members of the Canterbury Association.

The Association, founded in London on 27 March 1848, was incorporated by Royal Charter on 13 November 1849. The prime movers were Edward Gibbon Wakefield and John Robert Godley. Wakefield was heavily involved in the New Zealand Company, which had already established four other colonies in New Zealand (Wellington, Nelson, Petre and Otago) by that time. Wakefield approached Godley to help him establish a colony sponsored by the Church of England. John Sumner (the Archbishop of Canterbury) served as the President of the Association's Committee of Management, and the Committee itself included several other bishops and clergy, as well as members of the peerage and Members of Parliament. At its first meeting the Association decided upon names. The settlement was to be called "Canterbury" (presumably after the Archbishop of Canterbury), and the seat of the settlement was "Christchurch" (after the Oxford college Christ Church, at which Godley had studied).

== Establishment of the colony ==
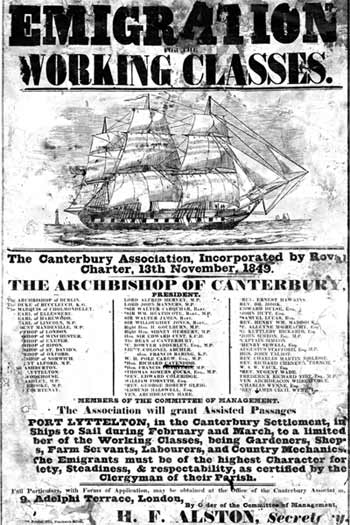
An 1850 Canterbury Association poster aimed at working-class people

The Association re-targeted its planned settlement from the Wairarapa to the Banks Peninsula hinterland, where it arranged to buy land from the New Zealand Company for 10 shillings per acre (4,000 m^{2}). The Association then sold the land to its colonists for £3 per acre, reserving the rest, the additional £2 10s, for use in "public objects such as emigration, roads, and Church and school endowments" (20 shillings = £1). The provision of funds for emigration allowed the Association to offer assisted passages to members of the working classes with desirable skills for the new colony. A poster advertising the assisted passages specifically mentions "Gardeners, Shep[herd]s, Farm Servants, Labourers and Country Mechanics". The religious nature of the colony shows in the same poster's requirement that the clergyman of their parish should vouch for applicants, and in the specific earmarking of some of the proceeds from land sales for church endowments.

Godley (with his family) went out to New Zealand in early 1850 to oversee the preparations for the settlement (surveying, roads, accommodation, etc.) already undertaken by a large team of men under the direction of Captain Joseph Thomas. These preparations were advanced, but incomplete when the first ships of settlers arrived on 16 December 1850 – Godley halted them shortly after his arrival in April due to the mounting debts of the Association. Lord Lyttelton, Sir John Simeon, 3rd Baronet, Edward Gibbon Wakefield, and Lord Richard Cavendish guaranteed £15,000 to the Association, which saved it from financial collapse.

In 1852, the Parliament of the United Kingdom passed the New Zealand Constitution Act 1852, which amongst other things established provincial councils. The Constitution contained specific provisions for the Canterbury Association; the first being that the new General Assembly (New Zealand Parliament) could not amend the legislation establishing the Canterbury Association, the second being that the Canterbury Association could hand its powers to a newly established provincial government (the Canterbury Province).

As a result, affairs of the Canterbury Association were wound up in 1855 and outstanding settlement lands were handed over to the Canterbury Province.

== Ships ==
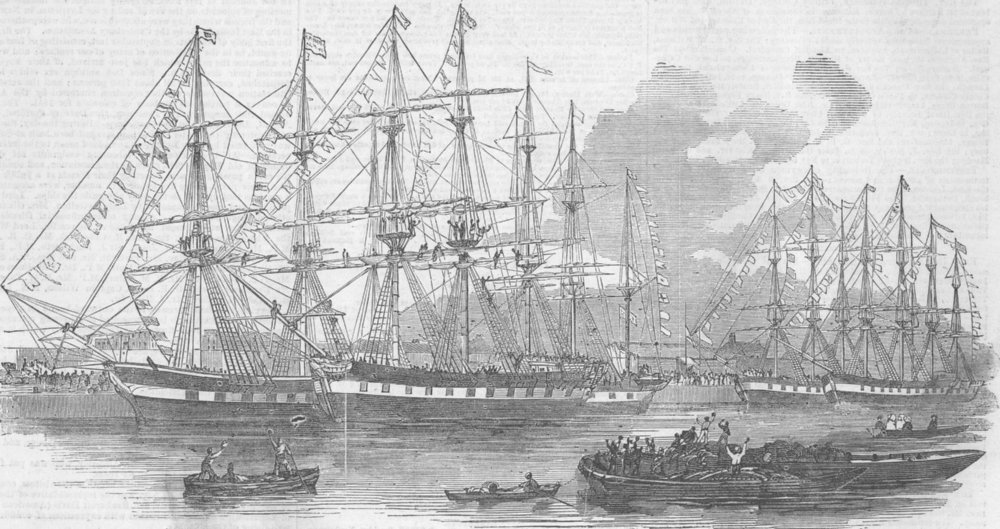
The Canterbury Association ships Bangalore, Dominion, Duke of Portland, Lady Nugent, and Canterbury in the East India Docks in 1851

Charlotte Jane and Randolph arrived in Lyttelton Harbour on 16 December 1850, Sir George Seymour the following day, and Cressy on 27 December, having set sail from England in September 1850. The British press dubbed the settlers on these first four ships "Canterbury Pilgrims." A further 24 shiploads of Canterbury Association settlers, making a total of approximately 3,500, arrived over the next two-and-a-half years.

Sources vary about the exact number of emigrant ships that the Canterbury Association sent to New Zealand. Some ships stopped at intermediate ports, either for repairs or because they had passengers for those ports. Ports such as Nelson or Wellington were also Ports of Entry, so immigrants might be recorded as arriving at that port before trans-shipping to Lyttelton (known as Port Victoria) and Canterbury. Shipping intelligence reported in the local newspapers of the time reported the ship's arrival but did not usually identify the commissioning organisation, only the port of origin or intended destination, the ship's master or captain, tonnage, and the date of arrival or departure. Cargo might also be reported. This means the ships on a particular list may depend on the inclusion criteria. Overall, these 28 ships listed below appear to be emigrant ships of the Canterbury Association. (In order of arrival.)

No.	Name	Arrival	Notes and references
1	Charlotte Jane	16 December 1850 am	
2	Randolph	16 December 1850 pm	
3	Sir George Seymour	17 December 1850	
4	Cressy	27 December 1850	
5	Castle Eden	17 February 1851	
6	Isabella Hercus '	1 March 1851	
7	Travancore	31 March 1851	
8	Duke of Bronte	6 June 1851	
9	Steadfast	9 June 1851	
10	Labuan	14 August 1851	
11	Dominion	18 August 1851	
12	Bangalore	21 August 1851	
13	Duke of Portland	26 September 1851	first voyage^{Other sources might disagree on date of arrival.}
14	Lady Nugent	18 September 1851	
15	Midlothian	8 October 1851	
16	Canterbury	21 October 1851	
17	Sir George Pollock	10 November 1851	
18	Cornwall	8 December 1851	
19	Fatima	27 December 1851	
20	Columbus	19 January 1852	^{via Nelson and Wellington}^{Other sources might disagree on date of arrival.}
21	William Hyde	5 February 1852	
22	Stag	17 May 1852	
23	Samarang	31 July 1852	
24	Persia	21 September 1852	^{via Nelson and Wellington}
25 (13)	Duke of Portland	21 October 1852	second voyage^{Other sources might disagree on date of arrival.}
26	Minerva	2 February 1853	
27	Tasmania	16 March 1853	
28	Hampshire	6 May 1853	

== See also ==
- New Zealand Company
- Otago Association
