= St Cuthbert's Church, Collingwood =

Church in Tasman District, New Zealand

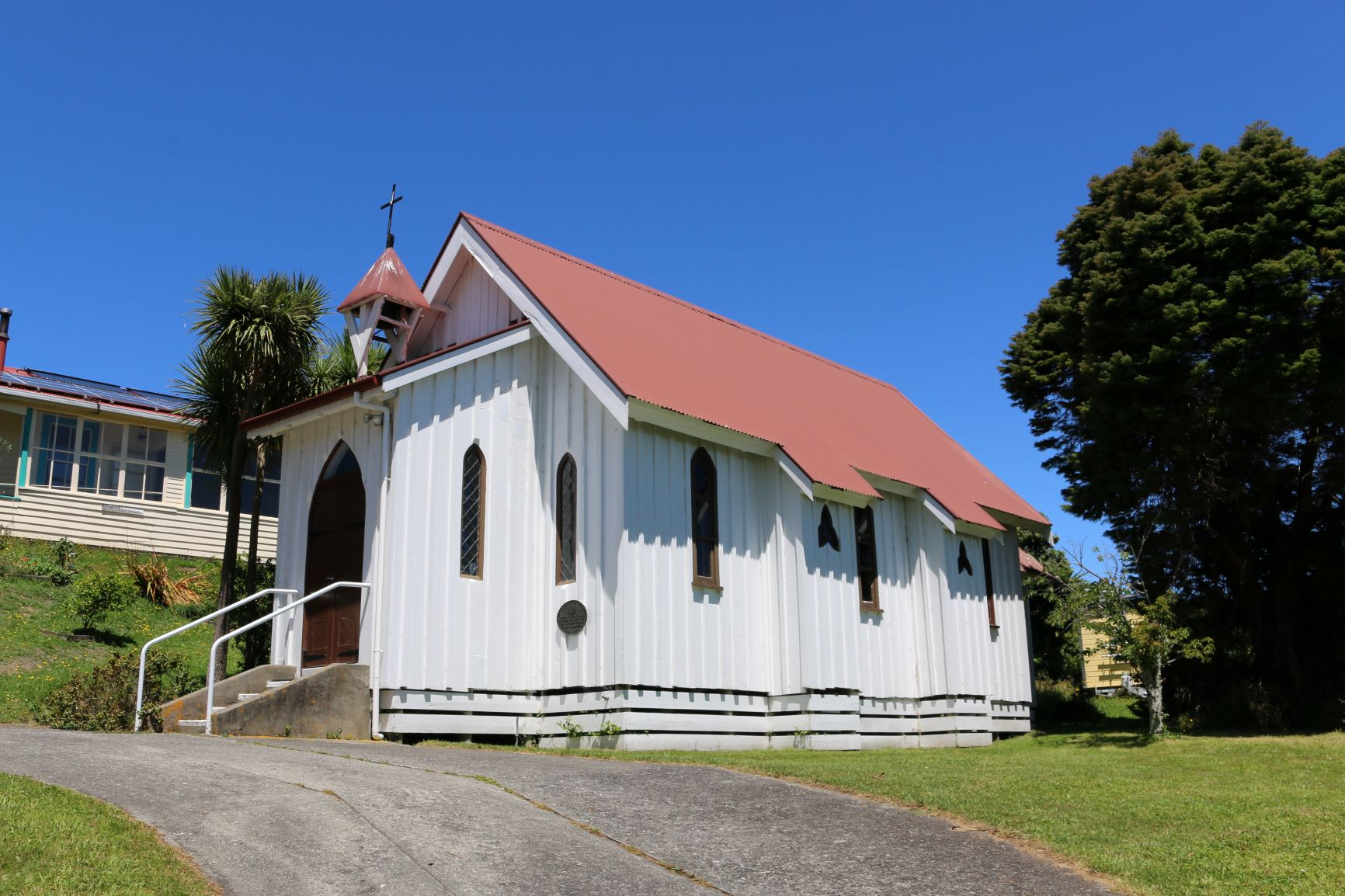
- St Cuthbert's Church, Collingwood
- 40°40′43.79″S 172°40′53.76″E
- Location: 15 Elizabeth Street, Collingwood
- Country: New Zealand
- Denomination: Anglican

History
- Dedication: Saint Cuthbert

Architecture
- Functional status: Active
- Architect: Thomas Brunner
- Architectural type: Church
- Style: Gothic Revival
- Completed: 1873
- Construction cost: £140

Administration
- Province: Anglican Church in Aotearoa, New Zealand and Polynesia
- Diocese: Nelson
- Parish: Golden Bay

Heritage New Zealand – Category 1
- Official name: St Cuthbert's Church (Anglican)
- Designated: 14 February 1991
- Reference no.: 1626

St Cuthbert's Church is a heritage-listed Anglican church at Collingwood in the Tasman District of New Zealand. Built in 1873, it is the oldest building in Collingwood. It is one of two churches designed by Thomas Brunner, a notable surveyor and explorer.

== Background ==
The area of Golden Bay / Mohua, in the Tasman District to the northwest of Nelson, was first settled by Europeans in 1842. The area upstream of the mouth of Aorere River was the scene of a gold rush in 1856–1857. The landowner there, William Gibbs, sold off the land on the south side of the river mouth and this became a settlement known as Collingwood. By 1859 a parish had been established covering the goldfields in the Golden Bay area. At Collingwood, a parsonage built while services were held in a school hall. Land was donated by Gibbs for the site of the church but by this time the gold rush in the area was in decline with richer pickings to be had in Otago.

== History ==
In 1871 the community at Collingwood was stimulated by the appointment of a Reverend Gaskin to the district and raised funds for a dedicated church. Thomas Brunner, a notable explorer and surveyor from Nelson, was commissioned to design the building and he in turn tendered its construction to a local builder, Mr Grange. By this time Gaskin was dead, having drowned in a crossing of the Aorere River. This hastened the building of the church as a tribute to him. Construction commenced in March 1873.

Sited on a hill, St Cuthbert's Church is in the Gothic Revival style and is relatively simple in design, with a rectangular plan but with bays extending either side of the nave and a porch at the end that serves as the main point of entry. The bays are covered with a roof that is continuous with that of the steeply pitched roof covering the remainder of the building. When built, the roof was wooden shingles but this was replaced less than twenty years later with corrugated iron sheets. A turret bell tower, overlooking the porch of the building, contains the first bell to be cast in Nelson. The Bishop of Nelson, Andrew Suter, donated the door and lancet windows for the building. Constructed from mataī timber, the church was completed in late 1873 at a cost of £140. It was finished in white with the roof in red.

When the building was completed, it was discovered that it had been incorrectly sited; a portion of St Cuthbert's was actually located on the adjoining plot of land. This delayed the opening of the church but the issue was remedied by the purchase of that plot.

== Legacy ==
St Cuthbert's Church is one of two churches designed by Brunner, the other being the older St Michael's Church in Brightwater. A social historian, David McGill, noted that St Cuthbert's Church has a "more mellow colonial style" relative to Brunner's earlier church. He postulates that this may have been as a result of the influence of Suter, who was less of an adherent to the pure Gothic style favoured by Bishop George Selwyn under whose auspices St Michael's Church had been designed.

The Historic Places Trust (now Heritage New Zealand) listed St Cuthbert's Church as a Historic Place Category 1 on 14 February 1991, with a list number of 1626. The church is also notable for being the oldest surviving building in Collingwood since major fires in the later part of the nineteenth and early part of the twentieth centuries destroyed much of the town's wooden buildings.
