= Samarang (ship) =

At least two vessels have been named Samarang, for Semarang.

== Samarang (1814 ship) ==
- The Dutch corvette Scipio was launched in 1784. She convoyed Dutch East Indiamen between the Cape of Good Hope and Europe until HMS Psyche captured her at Samarang in 1807. The British Royal Navy initially referred to her as HMS Scipio, but then renamed her to HMS Samarang in 1808. She was not commissioned in the Royal Navy. She was instrumental in the capture of Amboyna and especially Pulo Ay, and participated in the invasion of Java (1811). She was sold at Bombay in 1814. Samarang then entered mercantile service, sailing between Liverpool and India until 1827. She next became an opium trader sailing between India and Canton, and was broken up near Hong Kong in August 1833.

== Samarang (1840 ship) ==
- Samarang (1840 ship), of 45455/94 or 582 tons (bm), was launched by Green, Wigram's & Green, at Blackwall, on 7 March 1840. In 1852 she carried immigrants to Lyttelton, New Zealand, under the auspices of the Canterbury Association. Her crew abandoned her at sea in October 1887. The barque Rhine rescued her crew.

== See also ==
- HMS Samarang – any one of four vessels of the Royal Navy
