= HealthPost =

New Zealand business

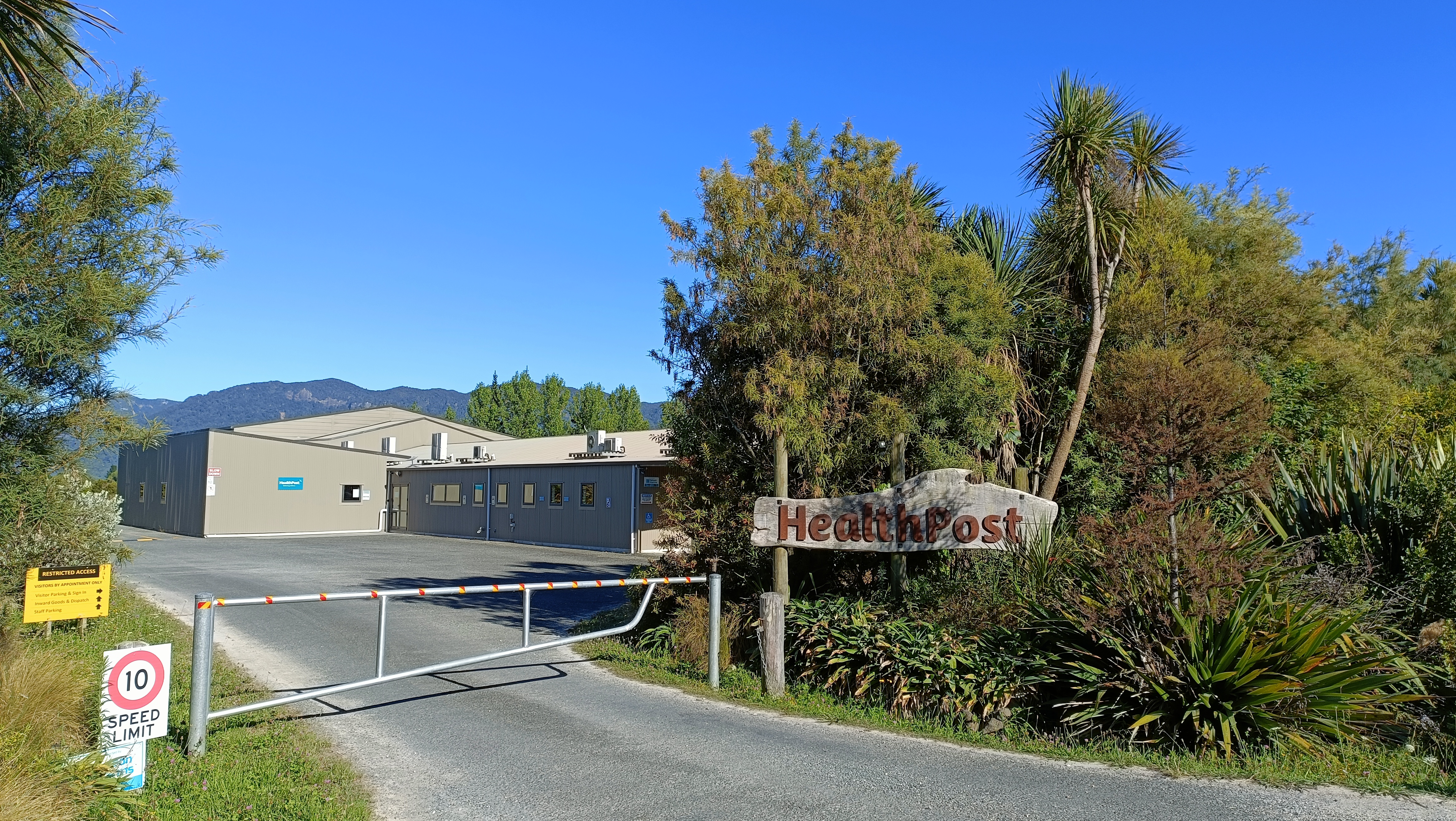
- Type: Online retailer
- Industry: Health and wellness
- Founded: 1988
- Founder: Linley Butler
- Headquarters: Collingwood, New Zealand
- Area served: Worldwide
- Products: Natural health products, beauty products, eco-living, health food & drink
- Services: Online retailer
- Website: healthpost.co.nz

HealthPost is a New Zealand-based online retailer specialising in natural health and beauty products. The company is the largest employer in Golden Bay / Mohua.

== History ==
HealthPost is an online retailer specialising in natural health, beauty, and health food products. The company has expanded its operations through partnerships with various technology and logistics firms.

Established in 1988 by Linley Butler, HealthPost is based in Collingwood, Golden Bay / Mohua. Originally, it operated as a mail-order company for natural-health products in New Zealand, notably for rural women. In 2002, it launched an online retail platform. In 2009, Butler gave the leadership of the business to her children Abel and Lucy.

HealthPost was named a finalist in the 2021 Sustainable Business Awards. In 2023, the company earned B Corporation certification. In 2023, the company also appeared on the long running television series Country Calendar

HealthPost is the largest employer in Golden Bay. In 2017, they had 85 staff at their headquarters in Collingwood, and a further 19 employees in Auckland. They are one of the larger customers of NZ Post, dispatching between 1,500 and 2,000 parcels per day from Collingwood. When Cyclone Gita washed out State Highway 60 over Tākaka Hill, the only road access to Golden Bay, NZ Post put on helicopters to collect the parcels.

In 2023, HealthPost purchased struggling Australian retailers Flora & Fauna and Nourished Life from BWX Digital.
