= Ngāti Tūmatakōkiri =

Māori iwi (tribe) in Aotearoa New Zealand

- Iwi (tribe) in Māoridom
- Rohe (region): Tasman, Nelson, Marlborough
- Waka (canoe): Kurahaupō

Ngāti Tūmatakōkiri is a Māori iwi (tribe) of New Zealand, who arrived on the Kurahaupō waka. In the 1600s the iwi settled northwestern South Island, becoming a major power in the region until the 1800s. In 1642, members of Ngāti Tūmatakōkiri made the first known contact between Europeans and Māori, when Dutch explorer Abel Tasman visited Golden Bay / Mohua.

== History ==
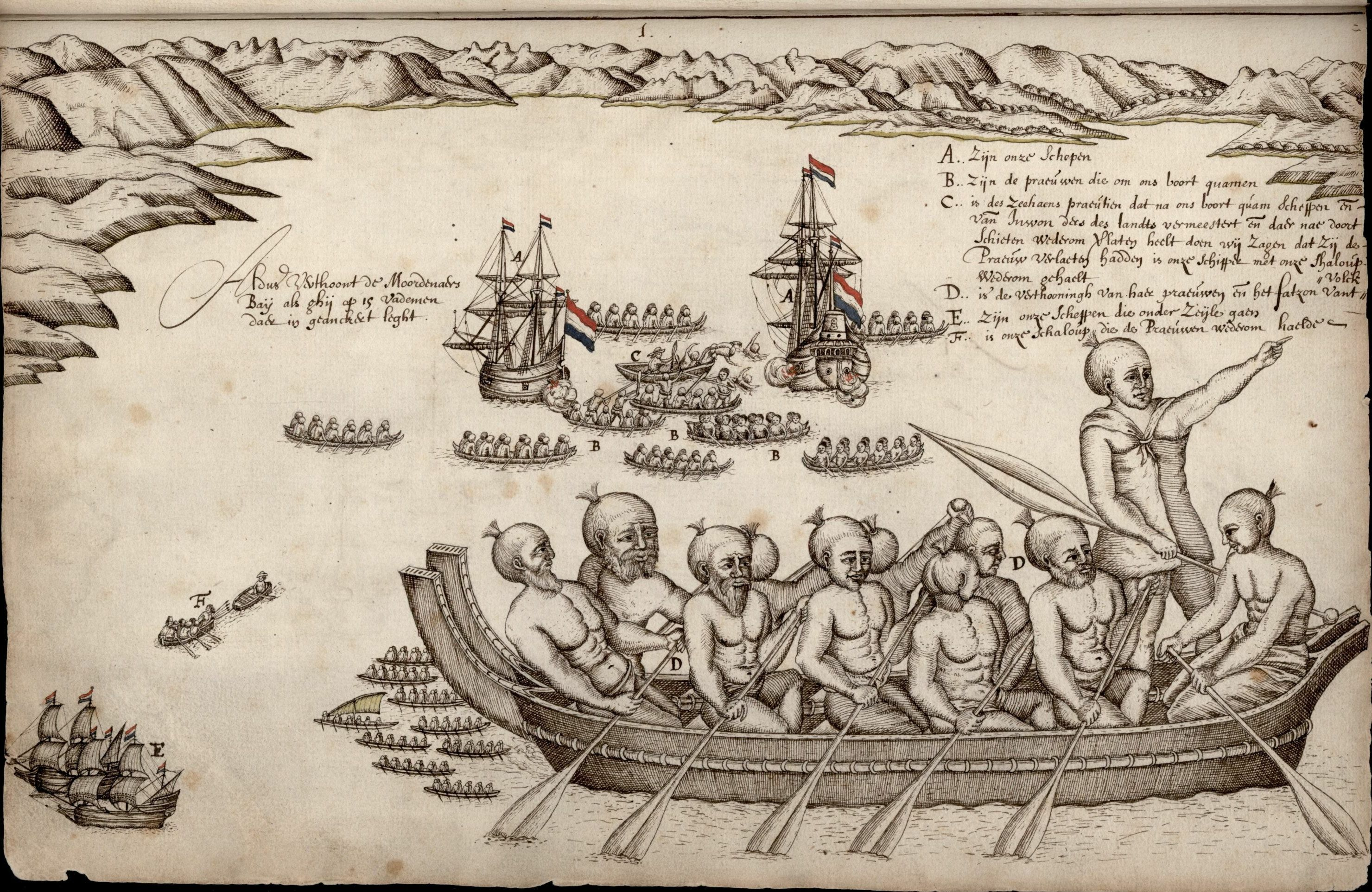
Members of the Ngāti Tūmatakōkiri taua, drawn by Isaack Gilsemans aboard Abel Tasman's voyage (1642)

The members of the Kurahaupō waka initially settled in the Bay of Plenty, and after several generations moved inland towards Taupō District and along the Whanganui River. In the late 1500s, the iwi began settling the Marlborough Sounds, however later moved westwards. By the 1600s, the rohe of Ngāti Tūmatakōkiri had expanded to include most of the northwest of the South Island, spanning from Māwhera (Greymouth) in the west to Whangarae (Croisilles Harbour in the Marlborough Sounds), displacing Ngāti Wairangi (Hauāuru Māori) to move south of Māwhera (Greymouth). Ngāti Tūmatakōkiri were the major force in the Tasman and Nelson regions for 200 years until the early 1810s, often coming into conflict with Ngāi Tahu to the south, likely over rights to capture birds and eels.

=== 1642: Meeting with Abel Tasman ===
The Ngāti Tūmatakōkiri people were the first known iwi to interact with Europeans, when Dutch explorer Abel Tasman on 13 December 1642. The ship Heemskerck, on the 18th, anchored north of what is now Abel Tasman National Park. The Ngāti Tūmatakōkiri sent two waka, and blasted pūkāea or pūtātara (trumpets) and incantations in challenge at the ship, which returned a trumpet sound and fired a cannon at the waka. The next morning, many waka came to harass the Dutch ships, and four Dutch sailors drowned after one smaller boat was rammed by a waka, while one member of the Ngāti Tūmatakōkiri war party was shot. Tasman's crew raised their anchor and left the area, without ever landing. Tasman named the place Moordenaers’ (Murderers’) Bay. It is now called Golden Bay.

=== Decline ===
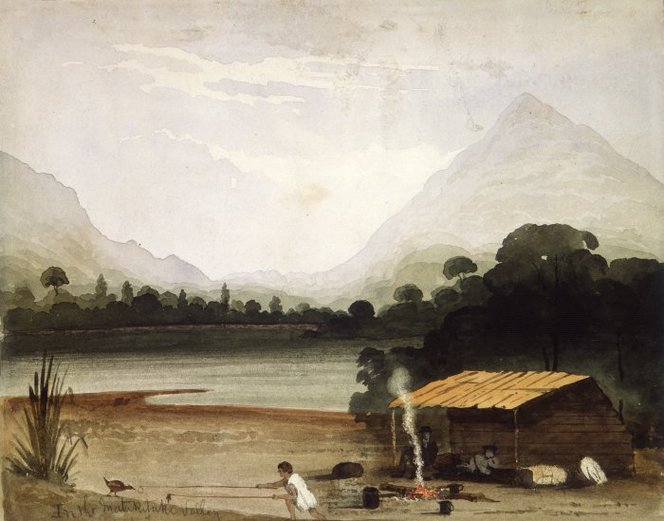
Painting of Kehu snaring a weka around present day Murchison, drawn by William Fox in February 1846.

By the late 1700s, the Ngāti Tūmatakōkiri faced a new threat from the Ngāti Apa tribe, who launched frequent waka canoe attacks on the Nelson region from their home base in the Kapiti coast of the lower North Island. The Ngāti Tūmatakōkiri were simultaneously harassed by the Ngāti Kuia tribe that resided in the Marlborough region to the east. The reasons for these intrusions was for the securing of the greenstone trail, of which the various tribes needed to cross Ngāti Tūmatakōkiri-controlled land in order to reach the greenstone deposits of the West Coast of the South Island. The Ngāti Tūmatakōkiri planned a massive wave of canoe attacks on the Ngāti Apa home base at Kapiti coast with the intention to occupy Kapiti Island. However, unfavourable winds resulted in several canoes capsizing, and the survivors were finished off by their enemies by the time they reached the shores of Kapiti Island. This left Ngāti Tūmatakōkiri vulnerable to reprisal attacks from all three neighbouring tribes, and their controlled land was gradually wrested from them.

In the late 18th century, Ngāti Tūmatakōkiri conflict with Ngāi Tahu on the West Coast and Canterbury lasted for a period of 10–15 years, sparked by a series of events where Wereta Tainui, son of Tuhuru of Poutini Ngāi Tahu, abducted Kokore Ngati Tumatakokiri and took her as a wife, and in retaliation Ngāi Tahu chief Pakeke was killed at Maruia. Ngāti Apa took advantage of this, and attacked Ngāti Tūmatakōkiri from the east of their rohe at Te Taitapu in Golden Bay / Mohua. Ngāi Tahu and Ngāti Apa were joined by Ngāti Kuia and Rangitāne, culminating in a battle in the Paparoa Ranges circa 1810 where Ngāti Tūmatakōkiri were defeated, and Tuhuru a chief of Poutini Ngāi Tahu, killed Te Pau and Te Kokihi, the paramount chiefs of Ngāti Tūmatakōkiri, and their followers. The remaining people were enslaved, and their rohe was split between the tribes: Ngāi Tahu taking the lands on the West Coast, Ngāti Apa settling in the Nelson region, and Ngāti Kuia controlling the eastern Tasman Bay. When Te Rauparaha invaded the region in the 1820s and 1830s, people who had been taken by Ngāti Apa were made to live as slaves within different iwi, Ngāti Toa, Ngāti Koata, Ngāti Rārua, Te Āti Awa and Ngāti Tama.

In 1846, a Ngāti Tūmatakōkiri tohunga named Kehu (Hone Mokehakeha) assisted European explorers Charles Heaphy and Thomas Brunner in exploring the upper South Island. Kahu Peak in the Saint Arnaud Range is named after this tohunga.

While Ngāti Tūmatakōkiri is not currently an autonomous iwi, some members of Ngāti Kuia and Ngāi Tahu descend from Ngāti Tūmatakōkiri. In 2017, people who had Ngāti Tūmatakōkiri ancestry took part in the ceremonies celebrating 375 years since the contact between Tasman's crew and Ngāti Tūmatakōkiri.
