= Collingwood, New Zealand =

Town in Golden Bay, New Zealand

Collingwood
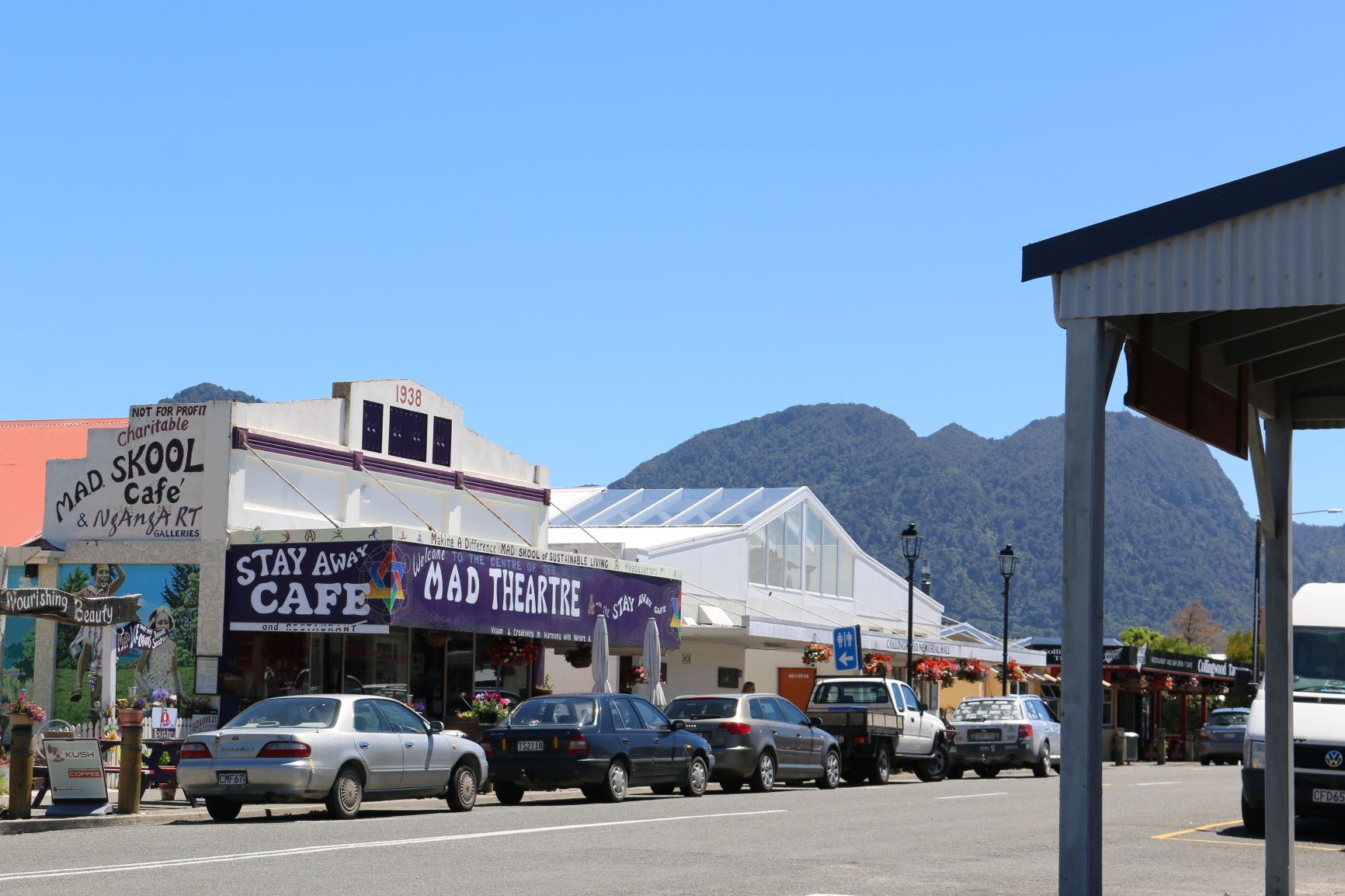
- Tasman Street in Collingwood
- Interactive map of Collingwood
- Coordinates: 40°40′38″S 172°40′58″E
- Country: New Zealand
- Territorial authority: Tasman
- Ward: Golden Bay Ward
- Community: Golden Bay Community
- Electorates: West Coast-Tasman; Te Tai Tonga (Māori)

Government
  - Territorial Authority: Tasman District Council
  - Mayor of Tasman: Tim King
  - West Coast-Tasman MP: Maureen Pugh
  - Te Tai Tonga MP: Tākuta Ferris

Area
  - Total: 1.66 km^{2} (0.64 sq mi)

Population (June 2025)
  - Total: 310
  - Density: 190/km^{2} (480/sq mi)
- Time zone: UTC+12 (NZST)
  - Summer (DST): UTC+13 (NZDT)
- Area code: 03

Collingwood is a town in the north-west corner of the South Island of New Zealand along Golden Bay / Mohua. The town is an ecotourism destination due to its proximity to Kahurangi National Park and Farewell Spit Nature Reserve.

== History ==
The town was originally named Gibbstown after the local settler and politician William Gibbs (1817–1897), who arrived in the area in 1851. The settlement was later renamed Collingwood after Admiral Cuthbert Collingwood, Lord Nelson's second-in-command at the Battle of Trafalgar in 1805.

Following the discovery of payable gold deposits in the Aorere Valley in 1856 the town's population surged. The population peaked at an estimated 2500 gold miners. In 1857 police buildings were built. In 1859 there were 3 merchants, 2 shoemakers, a tailor, 2 butchers and 7 inns. Fire damaged the town in 1859. In 1860 the gold rush was over and the miners had moved on to the West Coast of the South Island. In the late 1870s coal mining created a second mining boom for Collingwood.

The town has been damaged by fire several times, being almost destroyed in 1904 which started in the bakery and then spread to the general store. Every building on Tasman Street was destroyed.

In 1930 eight buildings were destroyed in a fire including the Collingwood Hotel and the Presbyterian Church. A fire in 1967 started in the Post Office Hotel and destroyed the hotel and the Memorial Hall. A replacement memorial hall was built in 1972 and contains the Collingwood Library.

HealthPost was founded in 1988 as a mail-order company for natural-health products. It has developed into a significant online retailer and is today the largest employer in Golden Bay.

== Geography ==
Collingwood is located along the western shore of Golden Bay at the mouth of the Aorere River. The town is the endpoint for State Highway 60. The road leaving the town to the southwest goes into the Aorere Valley. The road to the north leads to Cape Farewell via a number of small settlements.

== Demographics ==
Collingwood is described by Statistics New Zealand as a rural settlement. It covers 1.66 km^{2} (0.64 sq mi) and had an estimated population of 310 as of June 2025, with a population density of 187 people per km^{2}. It is part of the Golden Bay/Mohua SA2 statistical area.

Historical population
Year	Pop.	±% p.a.
2006	246	—
2013	246	+0.00%
2018	261	+1.19%
2023	306	+3.23%
The 2006 population is for a larger area of 1.74 km^{2}. Source:

Collingwood had a population of 306 in the 2023 New Zealand census, an increase of 45 people (17.2%) since the 2018 census, and an increase of 60 people (24.4%) since the 2013 census. There were 150 males, 153 females, and 3 people of other genders in 147 dwellings. 2.0% of people identified as LGBTIQ+. The median age was 58.3 years (compared with 38.1 years nationally). There were 45 people (14.7%) aged under 15 years, 18 (5.9%) aged 15 to 29, 135 (44.1%) aged 30 to 64, and 105 (34.3%) aged 65 or older.

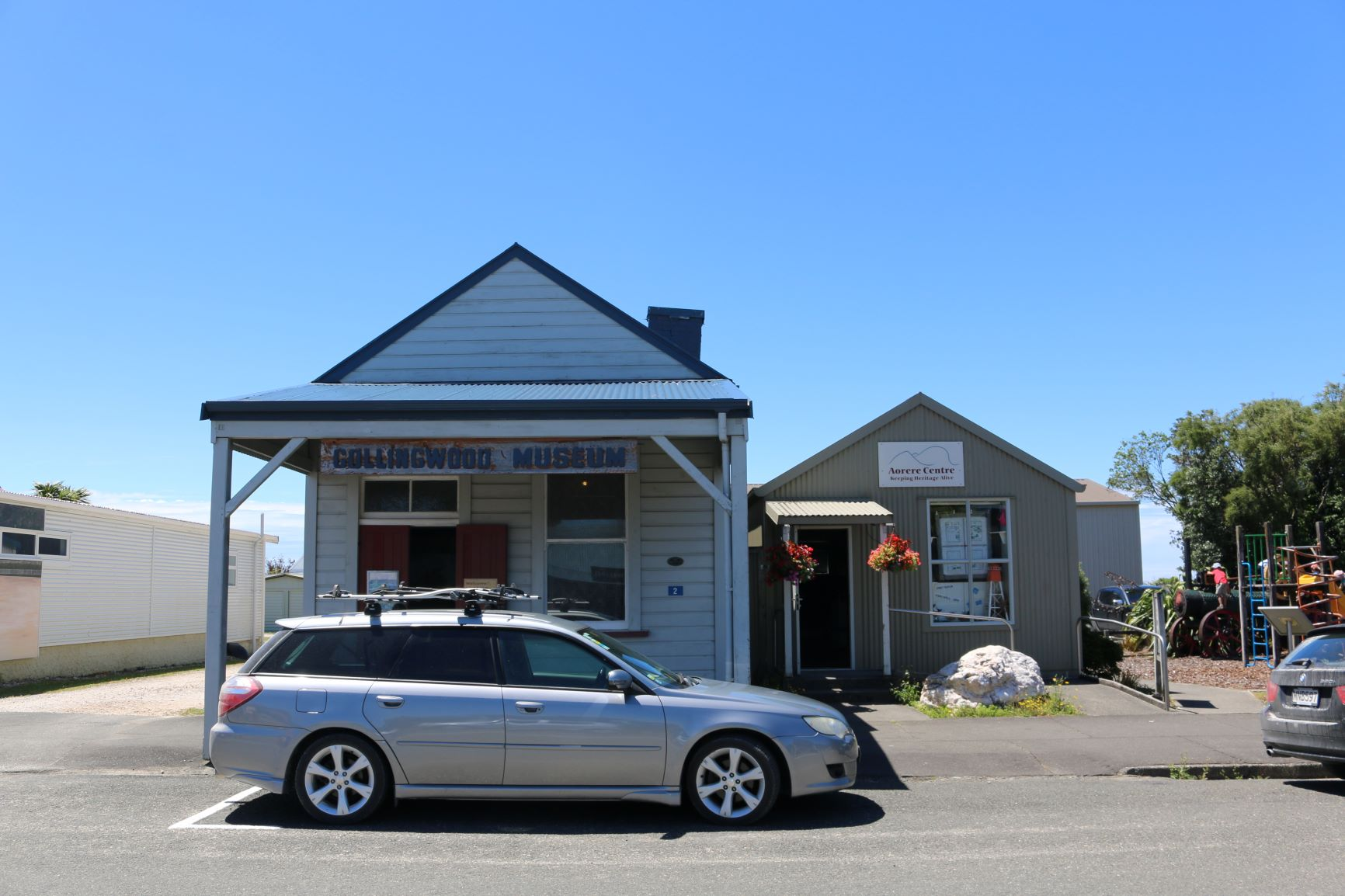
Collingwood Museum and Aorere Centre (2021)

People could identify as more than one ethnicity. The results were 92.2% European (Pākehā), 5.9% Māori, 1.0% Pasifika, 4.9% Asian, and 3.9% other, which includes people giving their ethnicity as "New Zealander". English was spoken by 98.0%, Māori by 1.0%, and other languages by 8.8%. No language could be spoken by 1.0% (e.g. too young to talk). New Zealand Sign Language was known by 1.0%. The percentage of people born overseas was 27.5, compared with 28.8% nationally.

Religious affiliations were 23.5% Christian, 1.0% Buddhist, 1.0% New Age, and 2.0% other religions. People who answered that they had no religion were 64.7%, and 6.9% of people did not answer the census question.

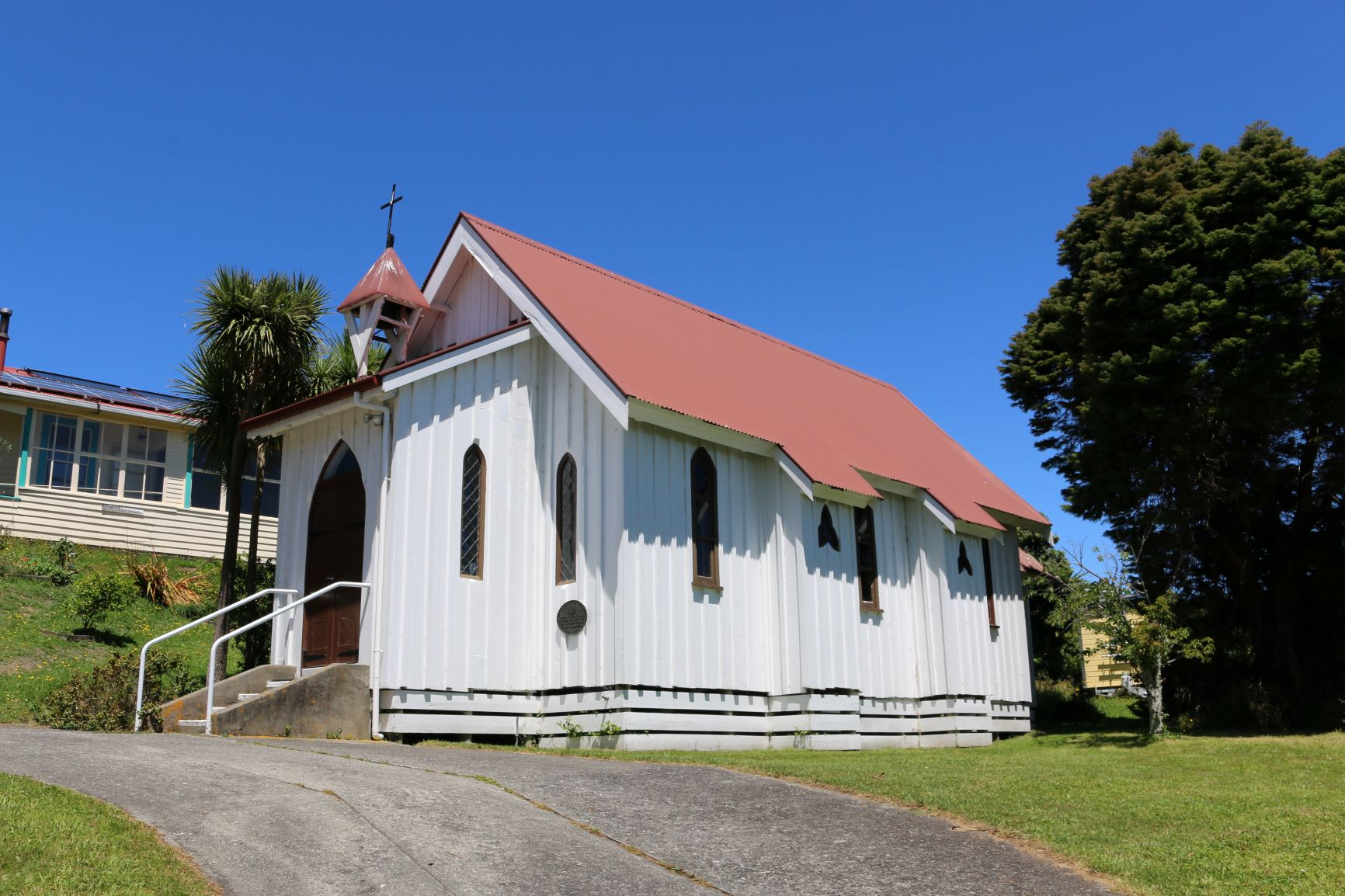
St Cuthbert's Church (2021)

Of those at least 15 years old, 81 (31.0%) people had a bachelor's or higher degree, 129 (49.4%) had a post-high school certificate or diploma, and 54 (20.7%) people exclusively held high school qualifications. The median income was $29,900, compared with $41,500 nationally. 18 people (6.9%) earned over $100,000 compared to 12.1% nationally. The employment status of those at least 15 was 87 (33.3%) full-time, 48 (18.4%) part-time, and 3 (1.1%) unemployed.

== Notable buildings ==
=== Saint Cuthbert's Anglican Church ===
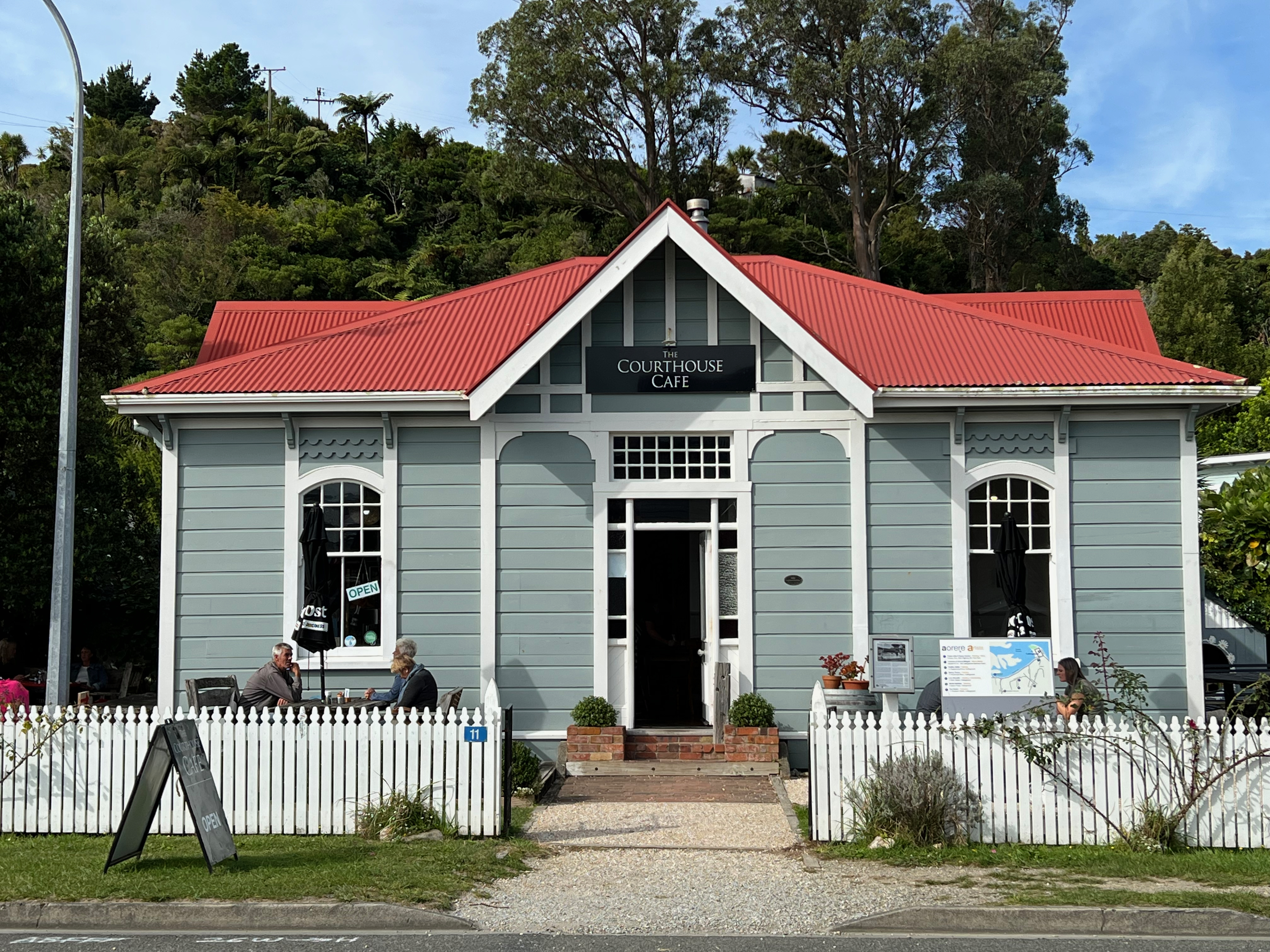
The former courthouse (2022)

Saint Cuthberts was completed in 1873 and built on land believed to have been donated by the town's founder William Gibbs. Local labour and timber were donated to complete the church. Thomas Brunner designed the church. The church having survived unscathed from the many fires that have damaged Collingwood is a New Zealand Heritage category 1 listed building. The church suffered some minor damage from vandals who were caught and prosecuted in 2011. The church seats approximately 50 people. The congregation numbered approximately 20–25 persons in 2016.

=== Courthouse ===
The courthouse opened in 1901 replacing an earlier 1882 building which was built to cope with the perceived lawlessness by an influx of miners to the district. It was designed by architect John Campbell and survived the fire in 1904 which destroyed many buildings. It is a Category 2 Historic Place and is now used as a cafe.

=== Post office ===
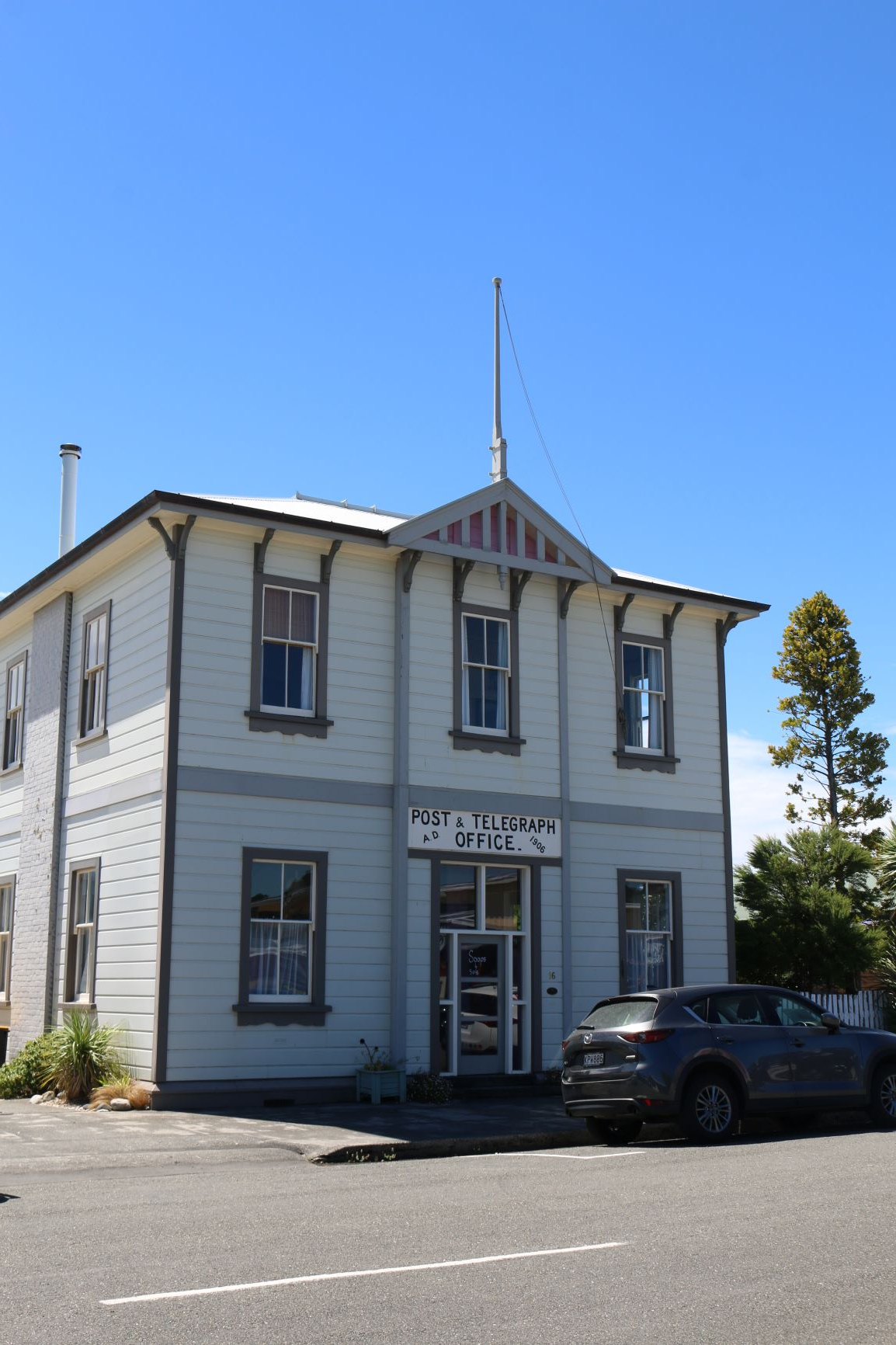
Former post office (2021)

The Post Office was built in 1906 after a fire in 1904 destroyed the first post office and many other buildings in the town. It was designed by John Campbell who designed many public buildings for the Public Works Department. It is a Category 1 Historic Place due to its being an unmodified example of a post office. Originally the ground floor was used as the post office and the upper floor was the postmaster's residence. The post office closed in 1988 but the building has since been used as an art gallery. In 2026 photographer Craig Potton and James Alker opened the Aorere Museum of Art (AMoA) in the building.

=== Collingwood Museum ===
The Collingwood Museum and Aorere Centre is located on Tasman Street. It was established in 1969 in the former 1910 council office building. It features local historical displays. It is a Category 2 Historic Building.

=== Golden Bay Machinery & Settlers Museum ===
The Golden Bay Machinery & Settlers Museum is located just outside of Collingwood at 869 Collingwood-Bainham Road, Rockville. The collection includes farm machinery including tractors, vehicles and early settlers items. A number of working pieces of steam machinery are also on display.

== Tourism ==
Collingwood is home to the only company with a concession to provide tours to Farewell Spit.

== Education ==
Collingwood Area School is a composite school (Years 1–13) catering for primary, secondary, and adult education in the greater Collingwood area, and had a roll of 155 as of July 2026. It opened in 1859 as Collingwood School, became a District High School in 1937, and Collingwood Area School in 1978.

== Notable people ==
- James Mackay (1931–1912), lived here from 1852 to 1864
- Fred Tyree (1867–1924), photographer; he ran a hotel in Collingwood for many years
