= Castle Eden (ship) =

Several vessels have been named Castle Eden, for Castle Eden.

== Castle Eden (1800 EIC ship) ==
- Castle Eden (1800 EIC ship) was launched in 1800 as an East Indiaman. She made six voyages for the British East India Company (EIC) before she became a transport in 1812 and disappears from online records.

== Castle Eden (1842 ship) ==
- Castle Eden (1842 ship), of 760 (old measure) or 930 (new measure) tons (bm), was launched at Sunderland. In 1851 she brought immigrants to Lyttelton, New Zealand under the auspices of the Canterbury Association. She was sunk at Rangoon on 6 May 1872.
