= Kehu =

Māori guide (born c. 1798; death unknown)

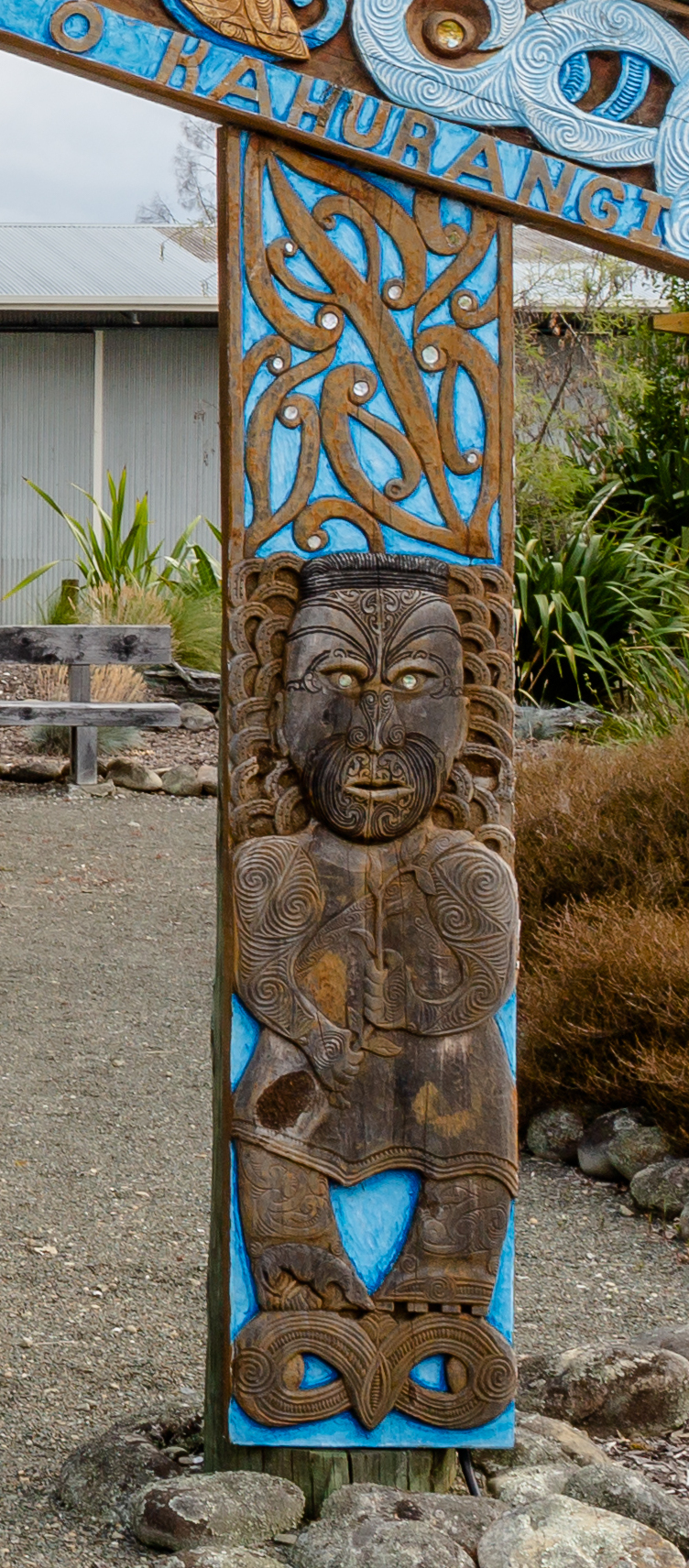
Gateway of Kahurangi National Park, Tapawera, New Zealand featuring a depiction of Kehu

Kehu, also known as Ekehu, Hone Mokehakeha and Hone Mokekehu, was an important ancestor to the Māori iwi (tribes) Ngāti Tūmatakokiri and Ngāti Apa ki te Rā Tō. He was an expert on how to traverse their regions and knowledgeable on natural resources contained within them. He was a guide to Thomas Brunner and Charles Heaphy, who were English explorers in the 1800s traversing parts of Te Waipounamu (now commonly known as the South Island of New Zealand).

== Early life ==
Kehu is from the Golden Bay region, he was born circa 1798. He was Māori, and on his mother's side, of the nations Ngāti Apa, Ngāi Tahu, Ngāti Mamoe and Ngāti Tūmatakōkiri, on his father's side Ngāti Tūmatakōkiri. His mother's name was Matanohinohi or Mata Nohinohi and was high-born and his father's name was Tamane. Kehu's half brother, born to Mata Nohinohi, was Mahuika who was the leader of a settlement on the Kawatiri River in the 1840s. His uncle was Puaha Te Rangi.

Historically the region of his iwi (tribe or nation) Ngāti Tūmatakōkiri was a large area of the north-western quadrant of Te Wai Pounamu from Croisilles Harbour, North of Nelson to Farewell Spit, then to the ranges east of Nelson and south to the Nelson Lakes, (Rotoiti and Rotoroa), and into the Maruia, Kawatiri (Buller), Inangahua and Māwhera from the 'headwaters to the coast'.

During the time around Kehu's birth, the region of Ngāti Tūmatakōkiri was attacked by other iwi including from the ocean by Ngāti Apa at Golden Bay / Mohua and overland by Ngāti Kuia, Rangitāne and Ngāi Tahu. Kehu from a young age had been on many travels around Tūmatakōkiri domains and knew the region well. At age around 12 Kehu was captured by Ngāi Tahu in the Battle of Kotukuwhakaoho near the junction of the Māwheranui and Arnold River. His father was killed at this battle by a Ngāi Tahu warrior Tau. Over his adolescence he was a slave or servant of Ngāi Tahu and most likely he worked in the region gathering food at seasonal locations.

== Guide ==
Around 1828–1832 Kehu was the property of Aperahama Panakenake and Poria Kahuraupo, chiefs of Ngāti Rarua, after Ngāi Tahu was defeated by a Tainui alliance. They were based at Motueka. Panakenake and Kahuraupo hired Kehu to guide New Zealand Company explorers including Thomas Brunner, Charles Heaphy and William Fox. During this time Kehu moved to Nelson and married a formerly enslaved woman who had run away from Ngāti Rārua chief Rurua Te Iti; her name may have been Mary. Kehu's wife also was a guide and travelled with the group. Kehu and his wife looked after Brunner when he became ill, and he credited them with saving his life.

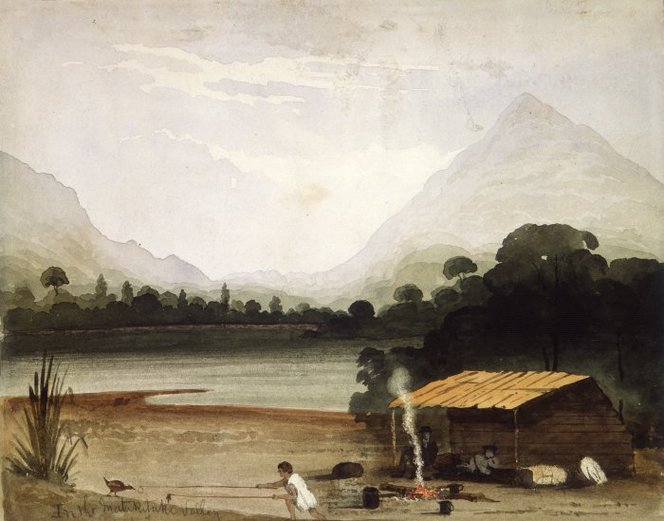
Kehu snaring a weka, Matakitaki Valley, 1847

In 1846 Kehu guided Heaphy, Brunner and Fox to the large glacial lakes, Rotoiti and Rotoroa; the English explorers were the first Europeans to see them. He used the Porika track through Howard Valley and Mātakitaki.

It is likely Kehu went to a Wesleyan Church and could read; he was said to have liked the scriptures.

Kehu was a Ngāti Tūmatakōkiri / Ngāti Apa tohunga and kaitiaki of the inland trails and the natural resources of the region. (Ngāti Apa ki te Rā Tō Deed of Settlement Schedule: Documents 2010)

For his great service to Ngāti Rārua he was granted land in Motueka, despite being a slave, and it is likely he spent his later years living there.

The date and circumstances of Kehu's death are not clear.

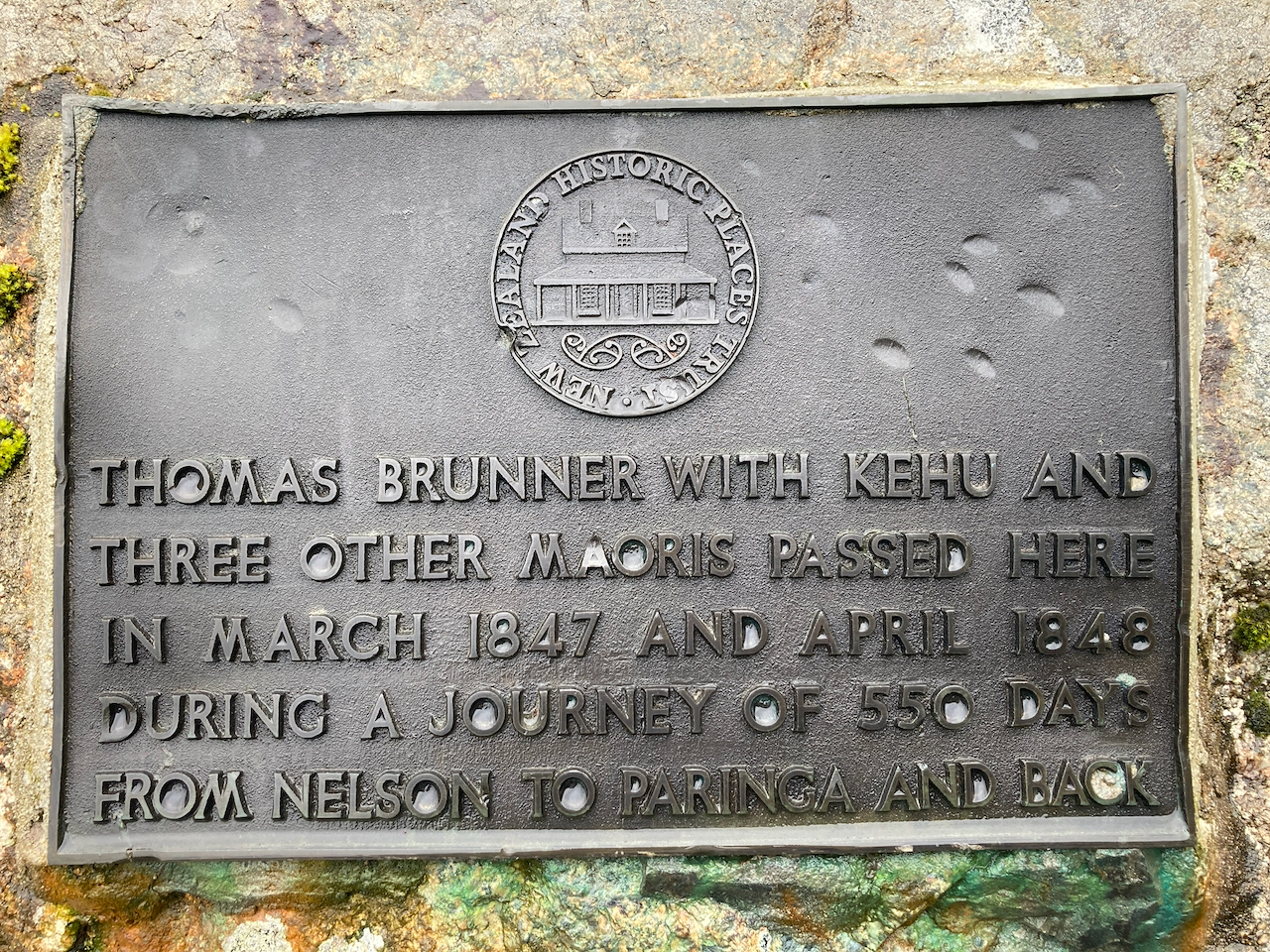
Kehu gets a mention in this Thomas Brunner Memorial

== Legacy ==
Kehu Peak in the Saint Arnaud Range is named for him. There is a memorial to Kehu that was revealed at the Department of Conservation Field Centre, Saint Arnaud, 30 June 1995.

Records about Kehu are found in European colonial journals and the Native Land Court records.

Ngāti Apa ki te Rā Tō refer to the tramping track commonly known as the Heaphy Track as Kehu's Track due to its use by their ancestors for several hundred years.
