= Nelson Battalion of Militia =

- Active: 1845
- Country: New Zealand
- Branch: Army
- Type: Militia
- Size: One Battalion
- Garrison/HQ: Fort Arthur, Nelson

The Nelson Battalion of Militia was a short-lived military unit of settlers, formed 12 August 1845 under the terms of the Militia Act of 1845. It was part of the New Zealand Wars.

This made the Nelson Battalion of Militia the first Army unit to be formed in the South Island and indeed one of the first in New Zealand. The 2nd Battalion (Canterbury and Nelson-Marlborough, and West Coast), Royal New Zealand Infantry Regiment celebrates 12 August 1845 as the beginning of its preceding units.

== History ==
The battalion was commanded by a Commandant, Captain Donald Sinclair, who was also the Nelson Magistrate and was organised into two companies, each of 50 men.

The appointment of the Commandant and other officers was gazetted on 28 August 1845 as being:

- Captains: Donald Sinclair, John D. Greenwood, David Monro
- Lieutenants: Thomas Renwick, Francis Dillon Bell
- Ensigns: Charles Thorpe, Alexander le Grand Campbell
- Quartermaster: Henry Seymour
- Adjutant: Richard Newcombe

The Militia Act of 1845, enabled the Governor to form local Militia units in districts that were under threat of hostile actions or emergencies. All males between the ages of 18 and 60, excepting judges, members of the Legislative Council, Māori and clergymen were expected to make themselves available for 28 days service every year. These Militia units were only permitted to operate within 25 mile radius of the settlement, and were consequently used mainly for garrison duties.

Uniforms were a blue shirt of sailor type pattern, a cap and trousers of any type. Whilst armaments were old flintlock muskets - weapons that had originally been imported for bartering with the Māori.

It is believed that the Nelson Militia had fifes and drums to provide them with musical support.

The battalion paraded and trained three times a day for the first 28 days at Fort Arthur in Nelson. By 28 November 1845 the last of the Militiamen had completed their service obligations and the unit was disbanded.

== Fort Arthur ==
Fort Arthur was an elongated hexagonal earthwork about 445 ft by 259 ft (136 m by 80 m), with bastions at each corner, on the flanks of a hill. Within the earthworks, on high ground, stood a stockade measuring 156 ft by 48 ft (48 m by 15 m). It had been built in September 1843 on the site of what is now Christ Church Cathedral (or Cathedral Hill) by the New Zealand Company, to provide a safe haven for the settlers of Nelson following the Wairau Massacre and growing aggression from local Māori.

== See also ==
- 10th (Nelson) Mounted Rifles
