= St Michael's Church, Waimea West =

St Michael's Church
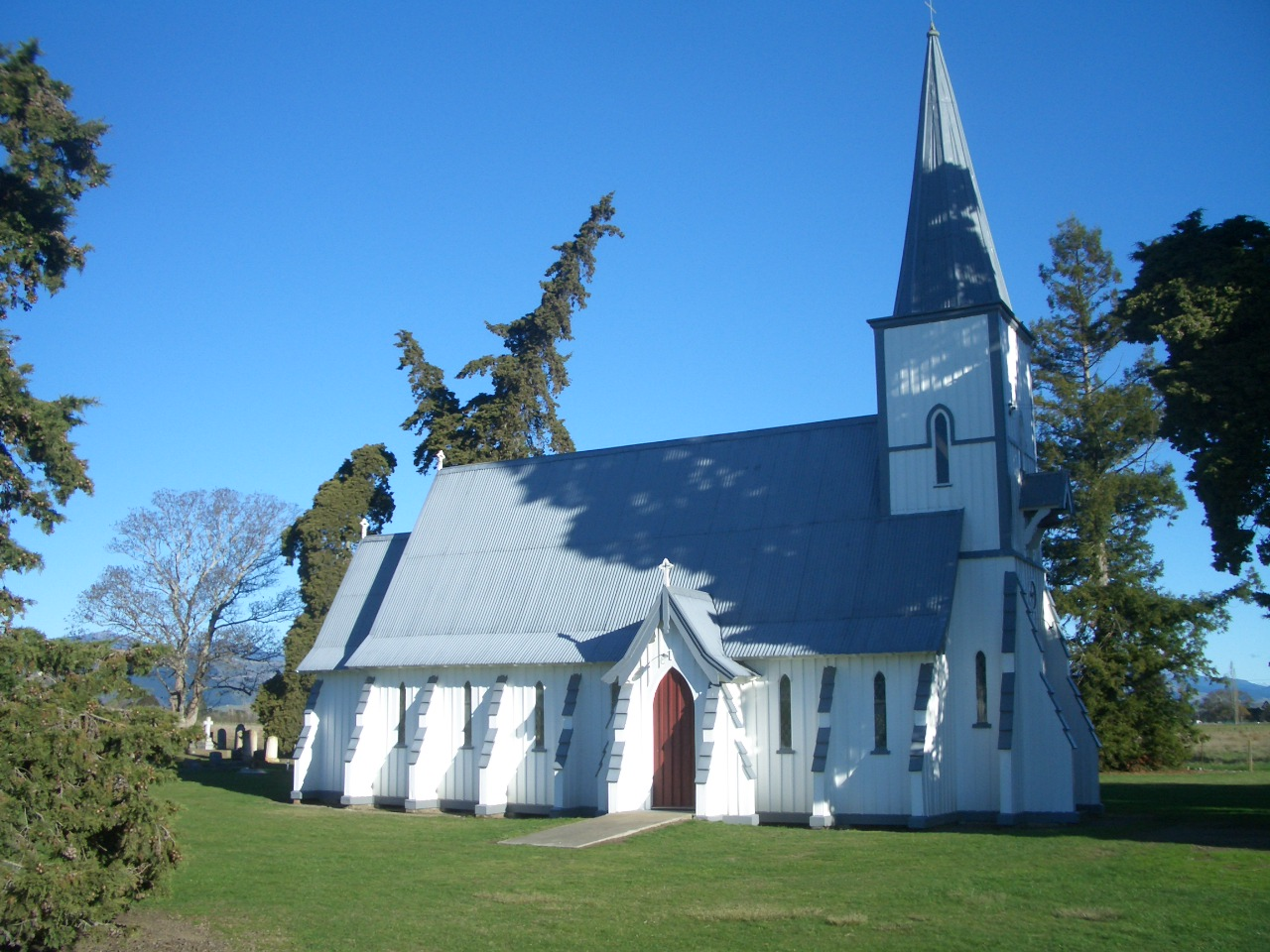
- St Michael's Church in Waimea West
- St Michael's Church
- 41°20′17″S 173°06′21″E
- Address: Waimea West Road
- Country: New Zealand
- Denomination: Anglican
- Website: www.nelsonanglican.org.nz/waimea-parish

History
- Founded: 24 November 1866
- Founder: Mrs Blundell
- Dedication: Saint Michael
- Consecrated: 13 November 1867 by Bishop Andrew Suter

Architecture
- Functional status: Active
- Architect: Thomas Brunner
- Architectural type: Church

Administration
- Province: Anglican Church in Aotearoa, New Zealand and Polynesia
- Diocese: Nelson
- Parish: Waimea

Heritage New Zealand – Category 1
- Official name: St Michael's Church (Anglican)
- Designated: 5 April 1984
- Reference no.: 248

St Michael's Church is an historic Anglican church, located in Waimea West in New Zealand. The original church building constructed in 1843 was the first church building in the Nelson Province and the parish is the oldest to have continuous church services in New Zealand. St Michael's Church is registered as a category 1 building with Heritage New Zealand.

== History ==
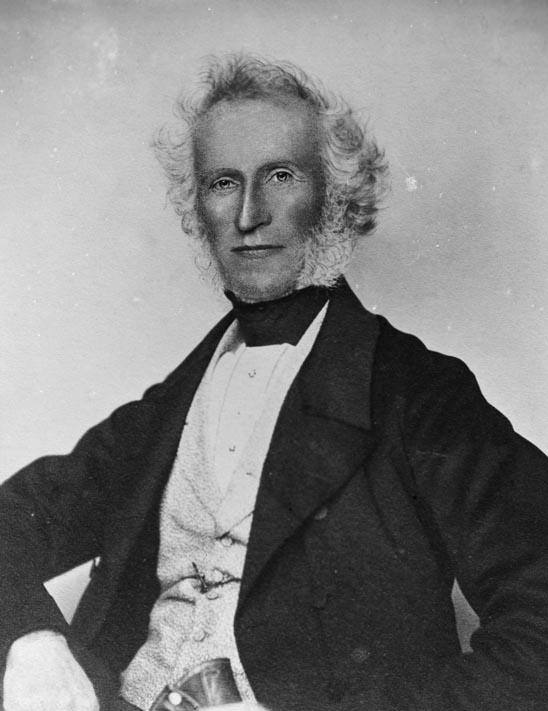
The church commemorates Capt. Francis Blundell (died 1865)

A church service was first held in the shed of John Kerr's father on 4 December 1842. Two of his neighbours, Saxton and Tytler, gave land for a church and vicarage, and the first service was held in the church on 24 December 1843. The church was the first church in the Nelson Province. The building had an overall length of 52 feet (16 m) and cost £105.

A building committee decided on building a new church and in May 1866, it appointed Thomas Brunner as the architect. The foundation stone for the new church was laid on 24 November 1866, and the ceremony was attended by many prominent people: Colonel Mathew Richmond, Sir David Monro, Arthur Seymour, Brunner as the architect, Edward Baigent, with the service conducted by Bishop Selwyn. The foundation stone was laid by Mrs Blundell. The committee decided on Christmas Day of 1866 that a memorial tablet to Captain Francis H. Blundell was necessary, as he had been one of the driving forces behind the new church building. It was probably New Zealand's first memorial church. Blundell was an immediate neighbour to the church and had died in 1865; he is buried in the church's graveyard on land that he gifted. The first service was held in the new church in July 1867. The new Bishop of Nelson, Andrew Suter, was due to arrive later in the year, and hence the church was not consecrated until 13 November 1867.

The church community tried to sell the old church, but received no suitable offers. It was used by Mrs Blundell as a Sunday school until it was blown over in high winds.

On 5 April 1984, St Michael's was registered with the New Zealand Historic Places Trust (now Heritage New Zealand) as a Category I structure with registration number 248.

== Bibliography ==
- Palmer, Leonard Russell; Bloyce, J. W.; Stewart, J. (1968). St Michael's Anglican Church: Waimea West, Nelson, New Zealand. Nelson, New Zealand.
