= Fatima (1849 vessel) =

Ship of the Canterbury Association

History
- Name: Fatima
- Builder: R. Hutchinson, Sunderland, England
- Launched: 1849
- Fate: Wrecked upon Great Detached Reef on 26 June 1854.

General characteristics
- Class & type: Barque
- Tons burthen: 521 tons
- Length: 112 feet (34 m)
- Beam: 26 feet (7.9 m)
- Draught: 19 feet (5.8 m)

Fatima was an English barque that was wrecked on 26 June 1854 in the Torres Strait. She was built by R. Hutchinson, Sunderland, Tyne and Wear, launched in 1849 and registered at Liverpool. Her cargo capacity was 521 tons burthen.

She sailed from London, England on 17 January 1850, under the command of Captain Ray, arriving at Port Adelaide, Australia on 11 June.

Under the command of Captain W. Hardie, on a voyage from Melbourne to Batavia, she struck the Great Detached Reef and was wrecked on 26 June 1854. The crew were rescued by the Bato off Raine Island.

Amongst the passengers on the outward voyage from London to Melbourne were Edward Thomas Fysh and his sister Harriet Fysh. Harriet married William Henderson Hardie in Melbourne and was on board the Fatima when the vessel was wrecked on Great Detached Reef. Harriet Fysh was grand aunt to Wilmot Hudson Fysh, pioneer aviator and co-founder of Qantas.
