= 10th (Nelson) Mounted Rifles =

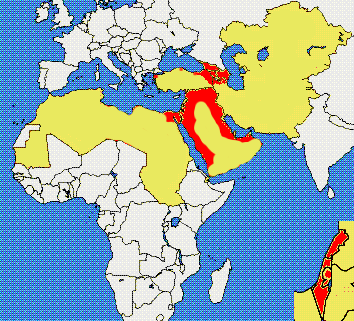
- Middle Eastern Theatre during the Great War
- Active: 1901–1944
- Country: New Zealand
- Allegiance: New Zealand Crown
- Branch: New Zealand Army
- Type: Cavalry
- Role: Mounted Infantry
- Size: One Regiment
- Part of: New Zealand Mounted Rifles Brigade
- Motto: Rem gero strenue (Fight with zeal)
- Equipment: Daimler Dingo; M3 Stuart Light Tank; M3 Scout Car; Universal Carrier
- Engagements: Second Boer War; World War I World War II

The 10th (Nelson) Mounted Rifles, previously known as the 1st Regiment, Nelson Mounted Rifles was a military unit based in Nelson, New Zealand. They served in the Middle Eastern theatre of World War I and first saw action during the Battle of Gallipoli. As a part of the larger New Zealand Mounted Rifles Brigade (of the ANZAC Mounted Division) they went on to serve in the Sinai and Palestine Campaign.

== History ==
Originally formed as the 1st Regiment, Nelson Mounted Rifles on 1 October 1901 with its headquarters in Nelson from the existing volunteer squadrons:

- A Sqn (Marlborough Mounted Rifle Volunteers) at Blenheim;
- B Sqn (Wakatu Mounted Rifle Volunteers) at Nelson;
- C Sqn (Takaka Mounted Rifle Volunteers) at Takaka;
- D Sqn (Motueka Mounted Rifle Volunteers) at Motueka.

=== First World War ===
The unit was renamed the 10th (Nelson) Mounted Rifles on 17 March 1911. They were mobilised during World War I as a squadron of the Canterbury Mounted Rifles Regiment.

=== Between the wars ===
In 1917 they were renamed the 10th (Nelson and Marlborough) Mounted Rifle Regiment and in 1921 became The Nelson-Marlborough Mounted Rifles.

=== Second World War ===
The regiment began mobilisation for war in 1941 as the cavalry regiment of 11th Brigade Group, 5th Division. On 1 January 1942 it was renamed the 10th Light Armoured Fighting Vehicles Regiment (Nelson-Marlborough Mounted Rifles). On 29 March 1944, 10th Light Armoured Fighting Vehicles Regiment (Nelson-Marlborough Mounted Rifles) was absorbed into the 3rd Armoured Regiment.

== Military actions ==
- Battle of Gallipoli
- Battle of Romani
- Battle of Magdhaba
- Battle of Rafa
- First Battle of Gaza
- Second Battle of Gaza
- Third Battle of Gaza
- Battle of Beersheba
- Battle of Megiddo (1918)

== Battle honours ==
- South Africa 1900–1902
- The Great War: ANZAC, Defence of ANZAC, Hill 60 (ANZAC), Sari Bair, Gallipoli 1915, Rumani, Magdhaba Rafah, Egypt 1915-17, Jordan (Amman), Palestine 1917-18.

== Alliances ==
- United Kingdom – King Edward's Horse
- United Kingdom – 10th Royal Hussars (Prince of Wales's Own)

== See also ==
- Nelson Battalion of Militia
