= List of schools in Nelson, New Zealand =

Nelson is a city and unitary authority in the South Island of New Zealand. It contains several city schools.

In New Zealand schools, students begin formal education in Year 1 at the age of five. Year 13 is the final year of secondary education.

State schools are those fully funded by the government and at which no fees for tuition of domestic students (i.e. New Zealand citizens and permanent residents, and Australian citizens) can be charged, although a donation is commonly requested. A state integrated school is a former private school with a special character based on a religious or philosophical belief that has been integrated into the state system. State integrated schools charge "attendance dues" to cover the building and maintenance of school buildings, which are not owned by the government, but otherwise they like state schools cannot charge fees for tuition of domestic students but may request a donation. Private schools charge fees to its students for tuition, as do state and state integrated schools for tuition of international students.

The socioeconomic decile indicates the socioeconomic status of the school's catchment area. A decile of 1 indicates the school draws from a poor area; a decile of 10 indicates the school draws from a well-off area. The decile ratings used here come from the Ministry of Education Te Kete Ipurangi website and from the decile change spreadsheet listed in the references. The deciles of all schools were last revised using information from the 2006 Census, and may occasionally change for some schools between Censuses as schools open, close and merge. The roll of each school changes frequently as students start school for the first time, move between schools, and graduate. The rolls given here are those provided by the Ministry of Education are based on figures from November 2024. The Ministry of Education institution number links to the Education Counts page for each school.

Name	Years	Gender	Area	Authority	Decile	Roll	Website	MOE
Auckland Point School	1–6	Coed	Beachville	State	5	98		3181
Birchwood School	1–6	Coed	Monaco	State	7	256		3182
Broadgreen Intermediate	7–8	Coed	Nayland	State	6	531		3184
Clifton Terrace School	1–6	Coed	Marybank	State	8	316	-	3187
Enner Glynn School	1–6	Coed	Enner Glynn	State	7	352		3189
Garin College	9–13	Coed	Richmond	State integrated	8	638		6975
Hampden Street School	1–6	Coed	Nelson South	State	7	492		3193
Hira School	1–6	Coed	Hira	State	10	63		3195
Maitai School	–	Coed	Nelson East	State	6	52	-	3202
Nayland College	9–13	Coed	Nayland	State	6	1,381		293
Nayland Primary School	1–6	Coed	Nayland	State	7	389		3208
Nelson Central School	1–6	Coed	Nelson East	State	7	413		3209
Nelson Christian Academy	1–8	Coed	Stoke	State integrated	7	316	-	1148
Nelson College	9–13	Boys	Nelson South	State	7	907		294
Nelson College Preparatory School	7–8	Boys	Nelson South	Private	9	99		4122
Nelson College for Girls	9–13	Girls	Nelson Central	State	7	864		295
Nelson College for Girls Preparatory School	7–8	Girls	Nelson Central	Private	9	96		4121
Nelson Intermediate School	7–8	Coed	Nelson South	State	6	412		3210
Nelson Teen Parent Unit	–	–	Beachville	State	1	0		670
St Joseph's School	1–8	Coed	Nelson East	State integrated	8	366		3221
Stoke School	1–6	Coed	Stoke	State	4	216		3223
Tahunanui School	1–6	Coed	Tāhunanui	State	5	266		3224
Victory Primary School	1–6	Coed	Nelson South	State	3	356		3231

== Closed schools ==
- Founders School (Private) - Closed 2005.
- Independent Middle School (Private) - Closed 2009
