= Nathaniel Morse =

New Zealand politician

Nathaniel George Morse JP (1822 – 16 November 1882) was a member of the New Zealand Legislative Council.

== Biography ==
Morse was born in Exeter, England, in 1822. In New Zealand, he initially lived near Nelson in Waimea West near the Redwood family. Morse was a prominent member of the Nelson Jockey Club and a successful breeder of race horses; his horse Ladybird won the 1863 New Zealand Championship Race in Dunedin.

Morse was an early settler, and together with John Cooper, he was the first to bring sheep into the Wairau Valley in November 1846. Morse and Cooper established a homestead above the Wairau River and they called it Top House, as it was at a higher altitude and further inland than any other dwelling in the Wairau Valley. A hotel and then a telegraph station were built, and they all adopted the name Top House. When a post office opened in 1891, the name was standardised as a single word; the Tophouse locality is located near State Highway 63.

Since 1861, national shooting competitions were held in New Zealand and Morse was the national champion in 1863. Morse was a member of the Nelson Volunteers and on 1 June 1860, he became the Captain of the 8th Company, Waimea West of the Nelson volunteer force. He succeeded Nathaniel Edwards, who had become too busy with business interests to devote his time to the volunteer forces. In May 1866, Morse was appointed Major in command of the Nelson militia and volunteer forces.

Morse was a member of the Legislative Council from 8 May 1866, and he was appointed to that body at the same time as Joseph Hawdon (Christchurch) and Ponsonby Peacocke (Auckland). Morse remained a member until 12 May 1869, when he resigned.

In 1869, Morse was made a Justice of the Peace. In 1873, he moved to Wanganui where he lived in a residence called Headlands. He continued with horse breeding and became a prominent member of the local jockey club. He was a member of the Wangaehu Highway Board. He died on 16 November 1882 at his residence, after having been ill for several weeks. He had suffered from dropsy for a long time. He was described as having been good humoured and possessing common sense.
