= Wairau Valley =

Valley and settlement in Marlborough, New Zealand

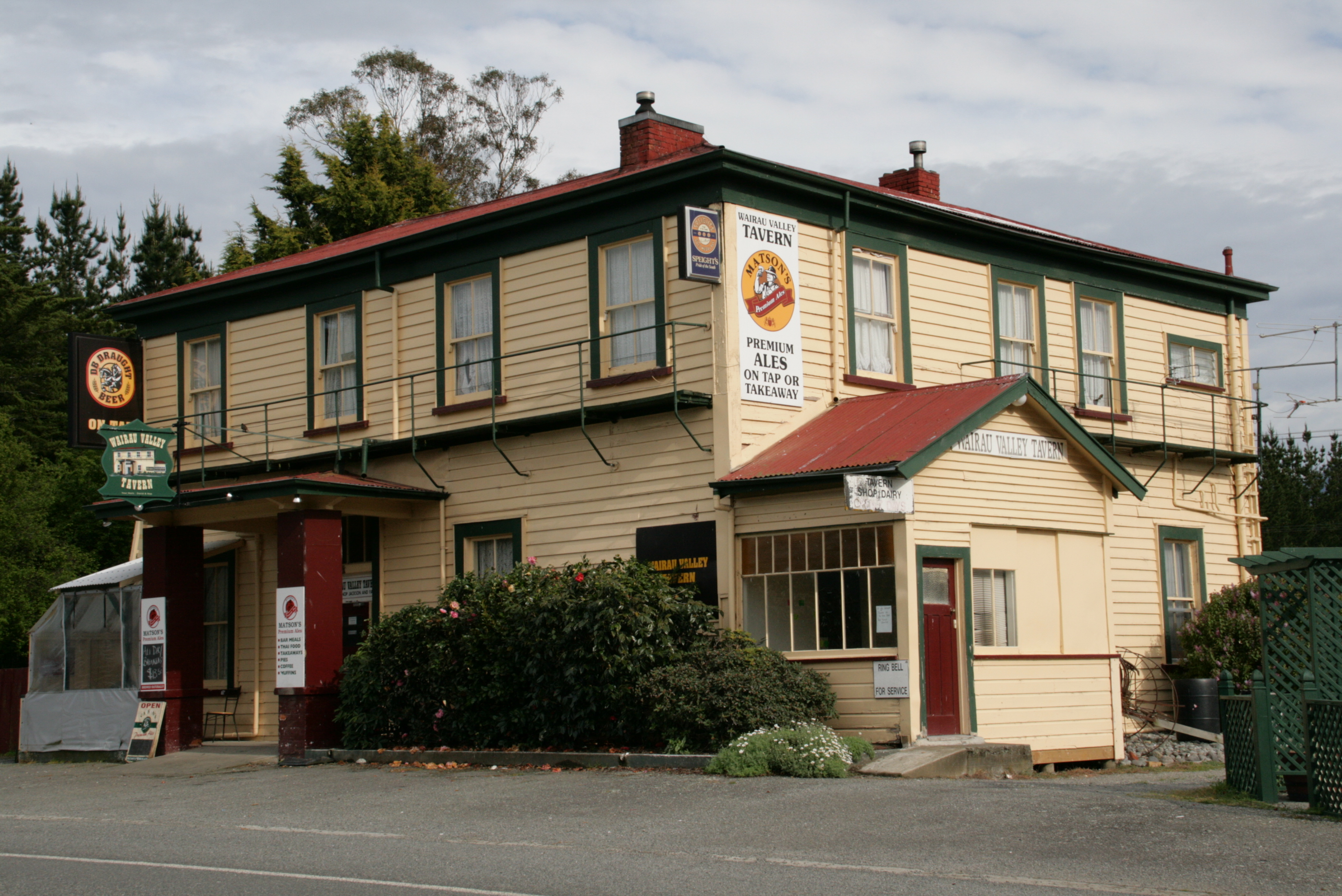
- Wairau Valley Tavern
- Interactive map of Wairau Valley
- Coordinates: 41°33′56″S 173°31′44″E
- Country: New Zealand
- Region: Marlborough
- Ward: Wairau-Awatere General Ward; Marlborough Māori Ward
- Electorates: Kaikōura; Te Tai Tonga (Māori)

Government
  - Territorial Authority: Marlborough District Council
  - Marlborough District Mayor: Nadine Taylor
  - Kaikōura MP: Stuart Smith
  - Te Tai Tonga MP: Tākuta Ferris

Area
  - Total: 4,177.50 km^{2} (1,612.94 sq mi)

Population (June 2025)
  - Total: 2,150
  - Density: 0.515/km^{2} (1.33/sq mi)

Wairau Valley is the valley of the Wairau River in Marlborough, New Zealand and also the name of the main settlement in the upper valley. State Highway 63 runs through the valley. The valley opens onto the Wairau Plain, where Renwick and Blenheim are sited. The Alpine–Wairau Fault runs along the length of the valley.

Wairauite is an iron-cobalt alloy which is named after the valley.

== History and culture ==
=== European settlement ===
J. S. Cotterell surveyed the Wairau Valley in November 1842, and reported it contained rich land. Settlers from Nelson, led by Arthur Wakefield, tried to take possession of the land but the Ngāti Toa, led by Te Rauparaha and Te Rangihaeata objected. The dispute escalated into the Wairau Affray at Tuamarina on 23 June 1843, in which 22 settlers and four Māori were killed. An enquiry held in 1844 by Governor Robert FitzRoy decided that the settlers were in the wrong.

In November 1846, Nelson farmers Nathaniel Morse and John Cooper drove sheep into the Wairau valley and established settlements. Governor Sir George Grey purchased the land in the same year, but legal title to the land for the settlers was sorted out later.

In the 1855 Wairarapa earthquake, the eastern end of the Wairau valley subsided by over a metre.

During floods in June 2025, Wairau Valley was cut off and some homes lost power. State Highway 63 had a massive crack appear and was closed.

=== Marae ===
Parerarua Marae is located in Wairau Valley. It is a marae (meeting ground) of Ngāti Rārua and includes the Parerarua wharenui (meeting house).

In October 2020, the Government committed $246,418 from the Provincial Growth Fund towards renovating the marae, creating an estimated 7 jobs.

== Demographics ==
Wairau Valley town is described by Stats NZ as a rural settlement. It covers 3.50 km^{2} (1.35 sq mi) and had an estimated population of 240 as of June 2025, with a population density of 69 people per km^{2}. It is part of the larger Upper Wairau statistical area.

Historical population for the settlement
Year	Pop.	±% p.a.
2006	180	—
2013	210	+2.23%
2018	231	+1.92%
2023	234	+0.26%

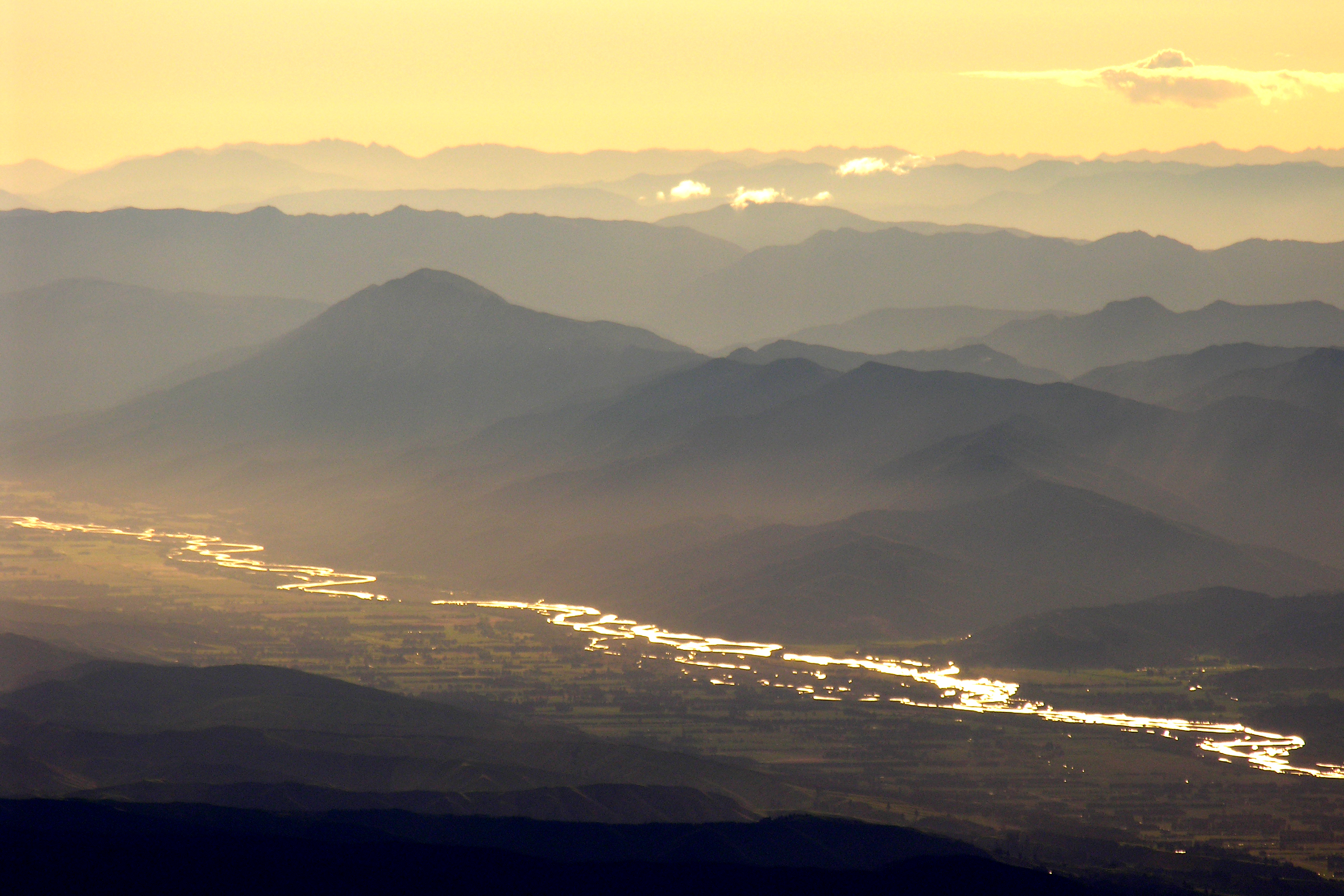
Wairau Valley

Wairau Valley had a population of 234 in the 2023 New Zealand census, an increase of 3 people (1.3%) since the 2018 census, and an increase of 24 people (11.4%) since the 2013 census. There were 117 males and 114 females in 93 dwellings. 1.3% of people identified as LGBTIQ+. The median age was 48.5 years (compared with 38.1 years nationally). There were 39 people (16.7%) aged under 15 years, 33 (14.1%) aged 15 to 29, 120 (51.3%) aged 30 to 64, and 45 (19.2%) aged 65 or older.

People could identify as more than one ethnicity. The results were 97.4% European (Pākehā); 10.3% Māori; 1.3% Middle Eastern, Latin American and African New Zealanders (MELAA); and 2.6% other, which includes people giving their ethnicity as "New Zealander". English was spoken by 97.4%, Māori by 1.3%, and other languages by 5.1%. No language could be spoken by 2.6% (e.g. too young to talk). The percentage of people born overseas was 16.7, compared with 28.8% nationally.

Religious affiliations were 20.5% Christian, 1.3% New Age, and 1.3% other religions. People who answered that they had no religion were 70.5%, and 7.7% of people did not answer the census question.

Of those at least 15 years old, 36 (18.5%) people had a bachelor's or higher degree, 126 (64.6%) had a post-high school certificate or diploma, and 30 (15.4%) people exclusively held high school qualifications. The median income was $42,800, compared with $41,500 nationally. 15 people (7.7%) earned over $100,000 compared to 12.1% nationally. The employment status of those at least 15 was 114 (58.5%) full-time, 30 (15.4%) part-time, and 3 (1.5%) unemployed.

=== Upper Wairau ===
The statistical area of Upper Wairau covers 4,177.50 km^{2} (1,612.94 sq mi). It had an estimated population of 2,150 as of June 2025, with a population density of 0.51 people per km^{2}.

Historical population for Upper Wairau
Year	Pop.	±% p.a.
2006	1,692	—
2013	1,746	+0.45%
2018	1,938	+2.11%
2023	2,091	+1.53%

Upper Wairau had a population of 2,091 in the 2023 New Zealand census, an increase of 153 people (7.9%) since the 2018 census, and an increase of 345 people (19.8%) since the 2013 census. There were 1,092 males, 993 females, and 6 people of other genders in 798 dwellings. 2.0% of people identified as LGBTIQ+. The median age was 45.1 years (compared with 38.1 years nationally). There were 402 people (19.2%) aged under 15 years, 258 (12.3%) aged 15 to 29, 1,065 (50.9%) aged 30 to 64, and 366 (17.5%) aged 65 or older.

People could identify as more than one ethnicity. The results were 95.0% European (Pākehā); 9.2% Māori; 1.3% Pasifika; 1.3% Asian; 0.6% Middle Eastern, Latin American and African New Zealanders (MELAA); and 4.4% other, which includes people giving their ethnicity as "New Zealander". English was spoken by 97.7%, Māori by 1.6%, Samoan by 0.1%, and other languages by 6.7%. No language could be spoken by 1.9% (e.g. too young to talk). New Zealand Sign Language was known by 0.1%. The percentage of people born overseas was 16.4, compared with 28.8% nationally.

Religious affiliations were 25.5% Christian, 0.3% Hindu, 0.1% Māori religious beliefs, 0.4% Buddhist, 0.4% New Age, and 1.6% other religions. People who answered that they had no religion were 62.0%, and 9.6% of people did not answer the census question.

Of those at least 15 years old, 420 (24.9%) people had a bachelor's or higher degree, 981 (58.1%) had a post-high school certificate or diploma, and 294 (17.4%) people exclusively held high school qualifications. The median income was $50,900, compared with $41,500 nationally. 249 people (14.7%) earned over $100,000 compared to 12.1% nationally. The employment status of those at least 15 was 972 (57.5%) full-time, 327 (19.4%) part-time, and 21 (1.2%) unemployed.

== Education ==
Wairau Valley School is a coeducational full primary (years 1–8) school with a roll of 31 students as of July 2026. It opened in 1861. Wantwood School, which opened in 1919, burned down in 1949 and closed, with the building moved to Wairau Valley School. Hillersden School, extant 1915, merged to Wairau Valley in 1946, with its building moved to Wairau Pā.

== Climate ==
Climate data for Wairau Valley (1991–2020)
Month	Jan	Feb	Mar	Apr	May	Jun	Jul	Aug	Sep	Oct	Nov	Dec	Year
Mean daily maximum °C (°F)	23.9 (75.0)	23.7 (74.7)	21.8 (71.2)	18.3 (64.9)	15.4 (59.7)	12.5 (54.5)	11.9 (53.4)	13.2 (55.8)	15.3 (59.5)	17.7 (63.9)	19.4 (66.9)	21.9 (71.4)	17.9 (64.2)
Daily mean °C (°F)	18.1 (64.6)	17.7 (63.9)	15.7 (60.3)	12.8 (55.0)	10.2 (50.4)	7.6 (45.7)	6.8 (44.2)	8.2 (46.8)	10.2 (50.4)	12.3 (54.1)	14.0 (57.2)	16.3 (61.3)	12.5 (54.5)
Mean daily minimum °C (°F)	12.3 (54.1)	11.8 (53.2)	9.6 (49.3)	7.3 (45.1)	4.9 (40.8)	2.6 (36.7)	1.7 (35.1)	3.1 (37.6)	5.1 (41.2)	6.8 (44.2)	8.5 (47.3)	10.7 (51.3)	7.0 (44.7)
Average rainfall mm (inches)	97.6 (3.84)	95.6 (3.76)	78.2 (3.08)	104.6 (4.12)	130.5 (5.14)	123.3 (4.85)	84.5 (3.33)	103.0 (4.06)	94.5 (3.72)	92.5 (3.64)	66.4 (2.61)	82.8 (3.26)	1,153.5 (45.41)
Source: NIWA
