= Charlotte Ann Sadd =

New Zealand artist (1866–1937)

- Born: 29 June 1866; Nelson, New Zealand
- Died: 12 April 1937 (aged 70); Nelson, New Zealand
- Resting place: Wakapuaka Cemetery

Charlotte Ann Sadd (29 June 1866 – 12 April 1937) was a New Zealand artist who exhibited widely in the country from 1882 until 1919.

== Biography ==
Sadd was born in Nelson on 29 June 1866. She was the daughter of Mary Agnes Sadd (nḗe Hodgson) and James Barton Sadd, a schoolmaster at the Nelson Central Boys' School. She was educated at Miss Pickett's School and studied art with Morgan Cooke and Colonel Branfill. She passed the South Kensington Art School exams with distinction. She primarily painted and exhibited in oils and watercolours. In 1882, she was awarded 1st place in map drawing and 2nd place in drawing copies with chalk at the Bishopdale Sketching Club.

Sadd was an active member of the Bishopdale Sketching Club (which later became the Nelson Suter Art Society), and served on the committee. She exhibited prolifically from 1882 to 1919 at:

- Bishopdale Sketching Club, later the Nelson Suter Art Society
- Auckland Society of Arts
- Canterbury Society of Arts, 1902–1914
- New Zealand Academy of Fine Arts, 1900–1919
- Otago Art Society
- New Zealand International Exhibition, 1906

Artworks by Sadd are in the collections of the Alexander Turnbull Library and the Suter Art Gallery. In 1910, she was a resident of Wellington but returned to Nelson by 1911, according to the 1911 electoral roll, and lived with her father at his house in Tory Street, Nelson.

Sadd died on 12 April 1937 in Nelson, and was buried at Wakapuaka Cemetery with several members of her family.

== Artworks ==
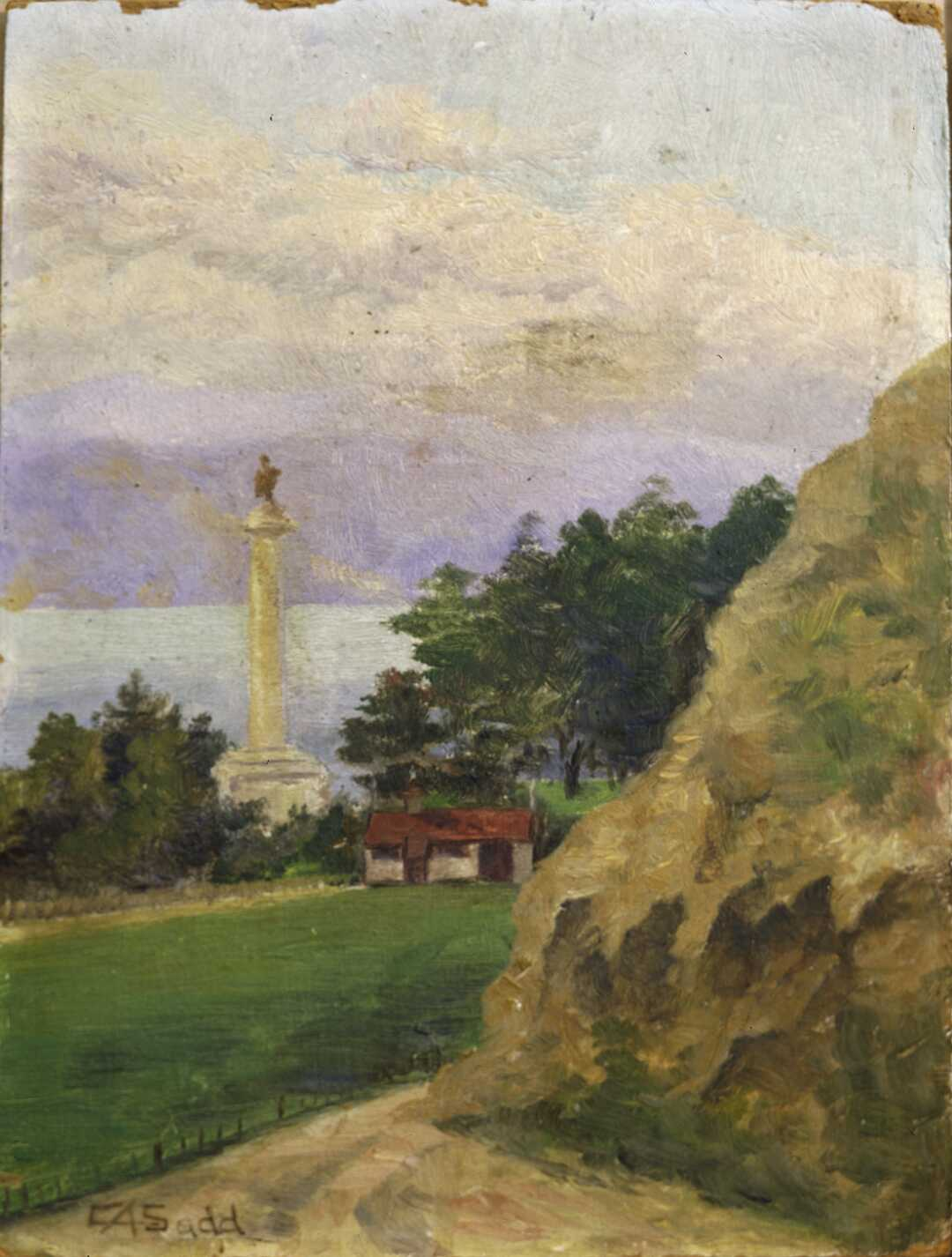
Seddon Memorial from Anderson Park by Charlotte Ann Sadd (Alexander Turnbull Library)

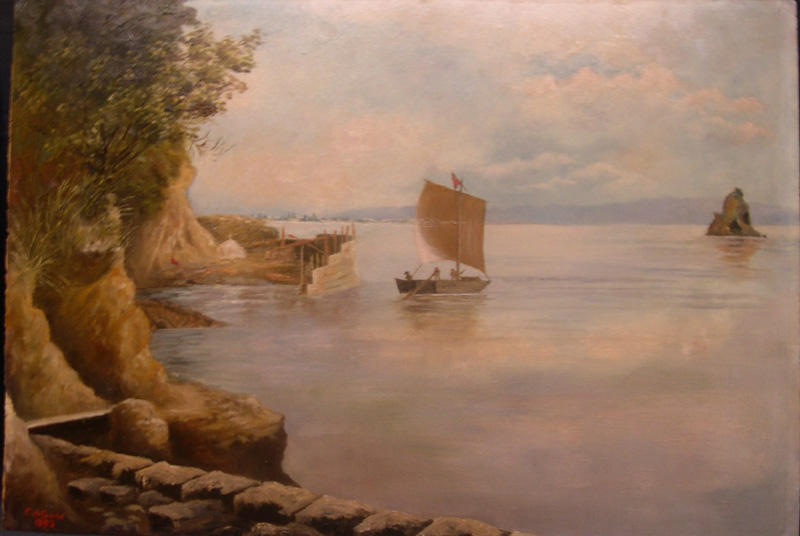
Rocks Road in the making by Charlotte Ann Sadd (Suter Art Gallery)
