= Greenmeadows Park =

Park in Stoke, New Zealand

Coordinates: 41°18′50″S 173°14′10″E

Greenmeadows Park is a park and suburb of Stoke, New Zealand. It lies close to the centre of Stoke, southwest of Nelson city centre.
