= Maitlands =

Suburb of Nelson, New Zealand

- Suburb
- Interactive map of Maitlands
- Coordinates: 41°18′20″S 173°14′50″E
- Country: New Zealand
- Region: Nelson
- Ward: Stoke-Tāhunanui General Ward; Whakatū Māori Ward
- Electorates: Nelson; Te Tai Tonga (Māori)

Government
  - Territorial Authority: Nelson City Council
  - Nelson City Mayor: Nick Smith
  - Nelson MP: Rachel Boyack
  - Te Tai Tonga MP: Tākuta Ferris

Area
  - Total: 0.76 km^{2} (0.29 sq mi)

Population (June 2025)
  - Total: 2,200
  - Density: 2,900/km^{2} (7,500/sq mi)
- Time zone: UTC+12 (NZST)
  - Summer (DST): UTC+13 (NZDT)
- Postcode: 7011
- Area code: 03

Maitlands is one of the suburbs of Nelson, New Zealand. It lies to the east of Stoke, immediately to the west of Enner Glynn.

== Geography ==
Maitlands covers an area of 0.76 square kilometres (0.29 sq mi).

== History ==
The estimated population of Maitlands reached 1,790 in 1996.

It reached 2,040 in 2001, 1,932 in 2006, 2,022 in 2013, and 2,148 in 2018.

== Demography ==
Maitlands has an estimated population of 2,200 as of June 2025, with a population density of 2,895 people per km^{2}.

Historical population
Year	Pop.	±% p.a.
2006	1,932	—
2013	2,022	+0.65%
2018	2,148	+1.22%
2023	2,157	+0.08%

Maitlands had a population of 2,157 in the 2023 New Zealand census, an increase of 9 people (0.4%) since the 2018 census, and an increase of 135 people (6.7%) since the 2013 census. There were 1,053 males, 1,092 females, and 9 people of other genders in 849 dwellings. 3.5% of people identified as LGBTIQ+. The median age was 41.0 years (compared with 38.1 years nationally). There were 396 people (18.4%) aged under 15 years, 327 (15.2%) aged 15 to 29, 1,023 (47.4%) aged 30 to 64, and 408 (18.9%) aged 65 or older.

People could identify as more than one ethnicity. The results were 87.5% European (Pākehā); 12.2% Māori; 2.2% Pasifika; 7.4% Asian; 0.6% Middle Eastern, Latin American and African New Zealanders (MELAA); and 2.8% other, which includes people giving their ethnicity as "New Zealander". English was spoken by 97.5%, Māori by 2.8%, Samoan by 0.4%, and other languages by 10.3%. No language could be spoken by 1.7% (e.g. too young to talk). New Zealand Sign Language was known by 0.4%. The percentage of people born overseas was 22.1, compared with 28.8% nationally.

Religious affiliations were 27.3% Christian, 0.8% Hindu, 0.4% Māori religious beliefs, 1.5% Buddhist, 0.6% New Age, 0.1% Jewish, and 2.1% other religions. People who answered that they had no religion were 62.2%, and 5.4% of people did not answer the census question.

Of those at least 15 years old, 429 (24.4%) people had a bachelor's or higher degree, 969 (55.0%) had a post-high school certificate or diploma, and 363 (20.6%) people exclusively held high school qualifications. The median income was $41,800, compared with $41,500 nationally. 126 people (7.2%) earned over $100,000 compared to 12.1% nationally. The employment status of those at least 15 was 921 (52.3%) full-time, 270 (15.3%) part-time, and 39 (2.2%) unemployed.

== Economy ==
In 2018, 11.2% worked in manufacturing, 8.7% worked in construction, 5.6% worked in hospitality, 4.8% worked in transport, 8.7% worked in education, and 11.7% worked in healthcare.

== Transport ==
As of 2018, among those who commuted to work, 73.5% drove a car, 2.8% rode in a car, 5.9% use a bike, and 5.9% walk or run.

No one used public transport.
