= Saint Arnaud Range =

Mountain range in New Zealand's South Island

Coordinates: 41°54′S 172°52′E

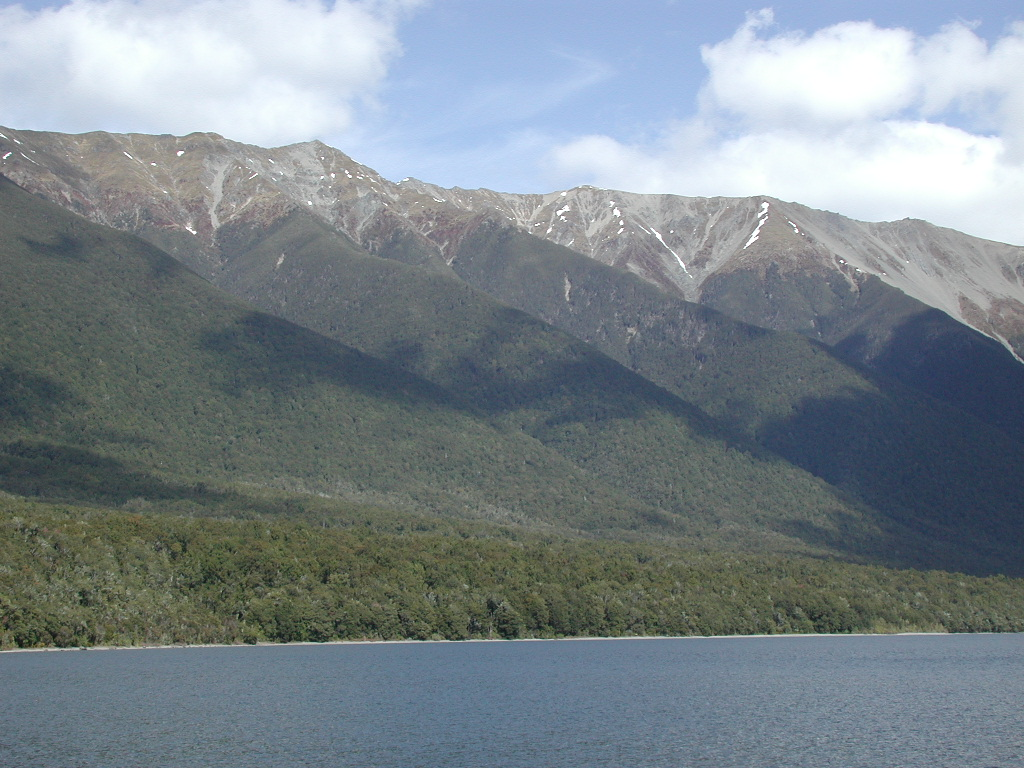
The mountains seen from the west across Lake Rotoiti

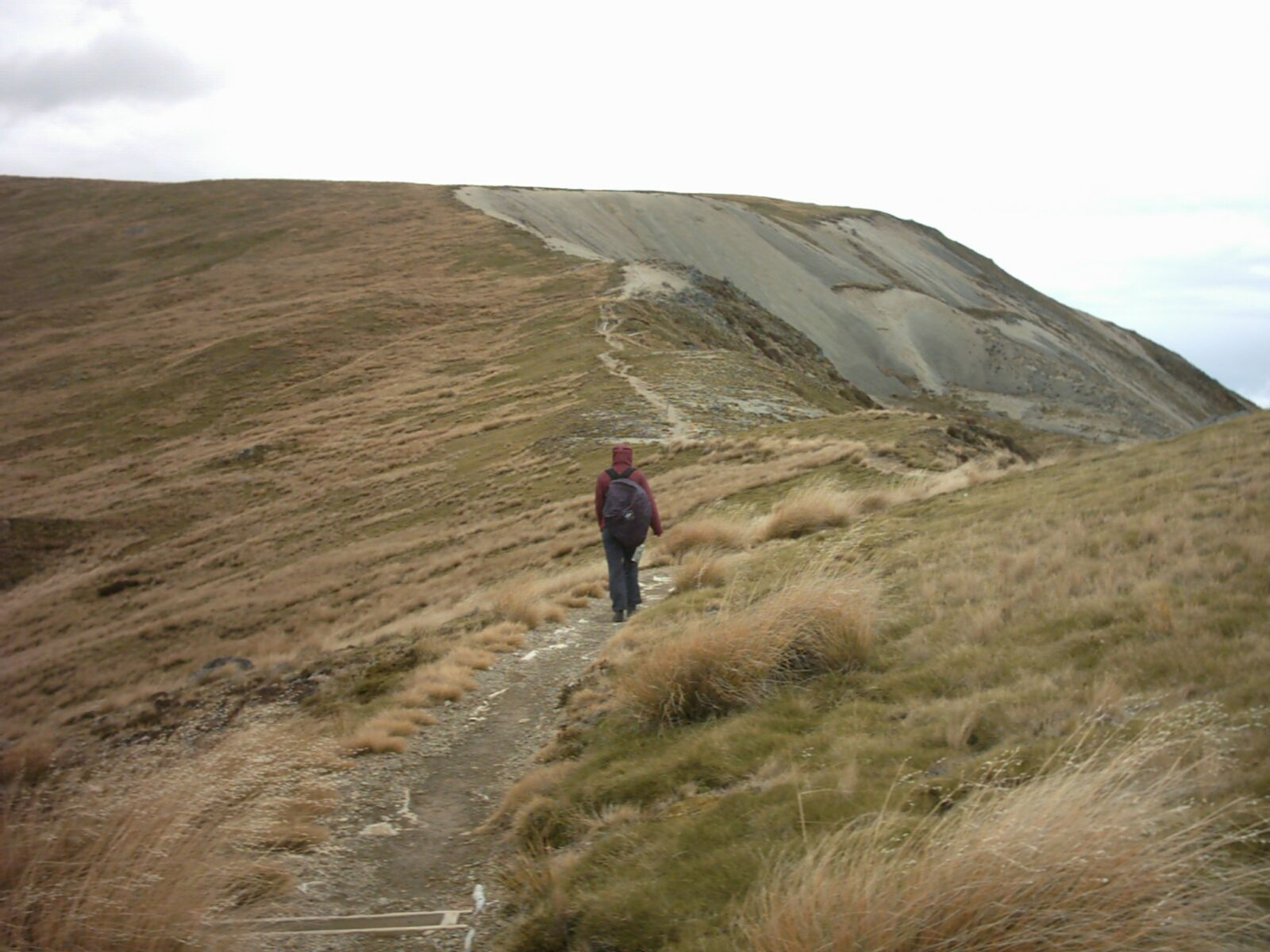
Alpine area just west of the St Arnaud Range

The Saint Arnaud Range is a mountain range in the central north of New Zealand's South Island. It lies between Lake Rotoiti and the upper reaches of the Wairau River, and marks the eastern boundary of Nelson Lakes National Park.

The lower elevations are covered primarily in beech forests, while higher elevations (above about 5,000 feet) are alpine.

The name of the range commemorates the French Marshal Jacques Leroy de Saint-Arnaud (1798–1854).

== Recreation ==
The St Arnaud track ascends the western side of the range from the village of Saint Arnaud (about 3 hours climb).

The Rainbow Ski Area is on the eastern side of the range.
