= Saint Arnaud, New Zealand =

Settlement in Tasman District, New Zealand

Saint Arnaud
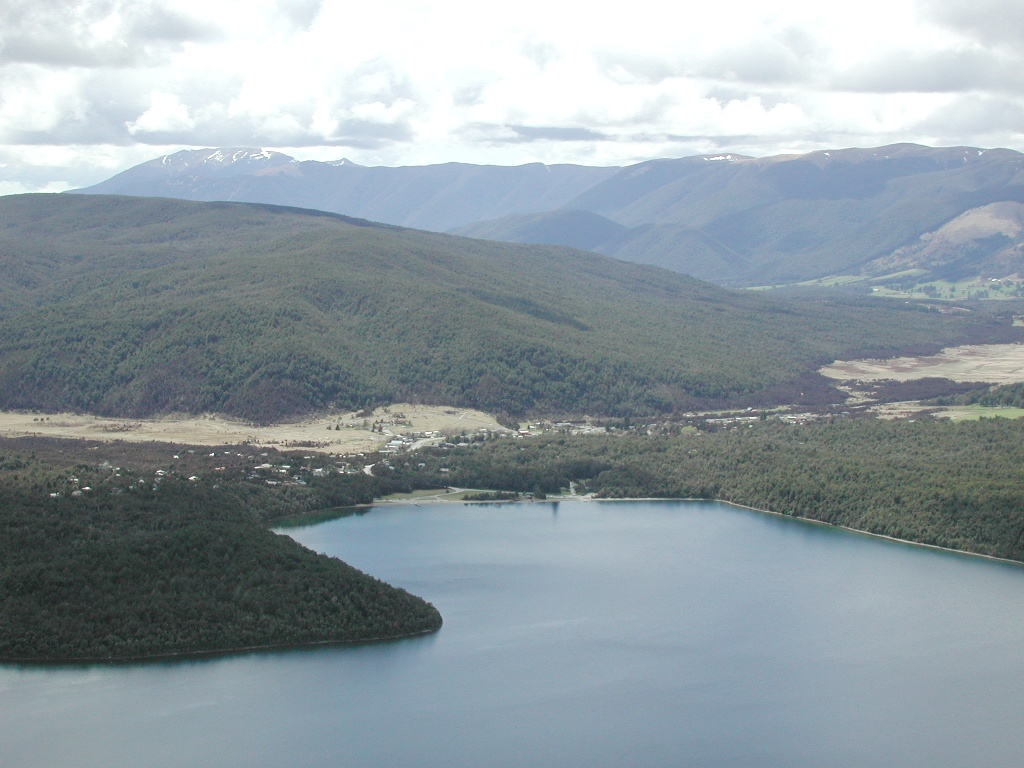
- View over Lake Rotoiti and St Arnaud
- Interactive map of Saint Arnaud
- Coordinates: 41°48′12″S 172°50′42″E
- Country: New Zealand
- Territorial authority: Tasman
- Ward: Lakes-Murchison Ward
- Electorates: West Coast-Tasman; Te Tai Tonga (Māori)

Government
  - Territorial Authority: Tasman District Council
  - Mayor of Tasman: Tim King
  - West Coast-Tasman MP: Maureen Pugh
  - Te Tai Tonga MP: Tākuta Ferris

Area
  - Total: 6.28 km^{2} (2.42 sq mi)
- Elevation: 650 m (2,130 ft)

Population (June 2025)
  - Total: 130
  - Density: 21/km^{2} (54/sq mi)
- Time zone: UTC+12 (NZST)
  - Summer (DST): UTC+13 (NZDT)
- Postcode(s): 7072
- Area code: 03

Saint Arnaud is a small alpine village in the Tasman district of New Zealand's South Island, west of the mountains of the Saint Arnaud Range and 90 kilometres southwest of Nelson near the historic Tophouse Settlement. It is situated at the northern end of Lake Rotoiti.

== Naming ==
The planned township was named St Arnaud in 1921, when it was renamed by the Department of Lands and Survey to avoid confusion with other communities of the same name. The area was earlier known by the name of the nearby Lake, Lake Rotoiti. Archives show that between 1921 and 1951 both names were unofficially used by local residents and government agencies when referring to the village area.

Such references include a letter dated 1 June 1950 from the Chief Surveyor of the Nelson District Office of the Department of Lands and Survey to the New Zealand Geographic Board stating that "for many years confusion has occurred due to correspondence addressed to the residents and visitors at Lake Rotoiti in the Nelson Land District going to Lake Rotoiti, near Rotorua, in the Auckland Land District. Due to the same confusion of names, the Town of Rotoiti in the Nelson Land District was altered to Town of St. Arnaud by this Department." However, the name St. Arnaud did not receive legal approval until it was gazetted on 19 July 1951. Some locals were opposed to this change, as shown by a 4 December 1950 petition held by the New Zealand Geographic Board opposing the name change. Some local residents today still give their address as Lake Rotoiti, even with St. Arnaud as the official name.

A proposal with the New Zealand Geographic Board to either change the village's name back to its original name of Rotoiti or to use a dual name (a relatively common practice in New Zealand), failed in 2007. A survey had originally indicated that just over half of the area residents supported a return to the original name.

The town's name is something of a shibboleth: while the official pronunciation is the same as would be expected from a French-language name (/'ɑː.noʊ/), locals often voice the name's end as /'ɑː.nəd/.

== Demographics ==
Saint Arnaud is described by Stats NZ as a rural settlement. It covers 6.28 km^{2} (2.42 sq mi) and had an estimated population of 130 as of June 2025, with a population density of 21 people per km^{2}. It is part of the larger Murchison-Nelson Lakes statistical area.

Historical population
| Year | Pop. | ±% p.a. |
|---|---|---|
| 2006 | 78 | — |
| 2013 | 105 | +4.34% |
| 2018 | 111 | +1.12% |
| 2023 | 129 | +3.05% |

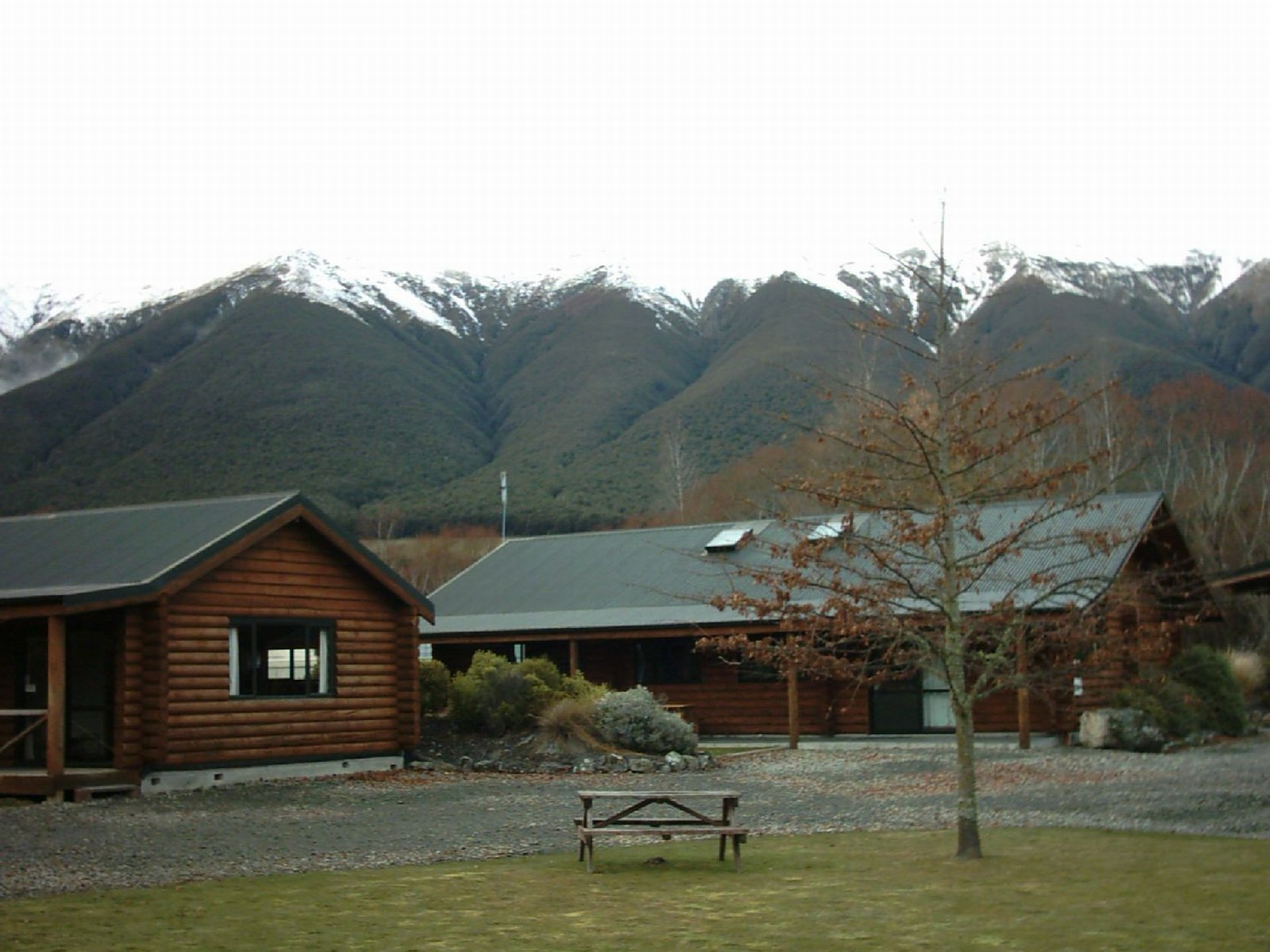
Youth hostel cottages, the Saint Arnaud Range behind.

St Arnaud had a population of 129 in the 2023 New Zealand census, an increase of 18 people (16.2%) since the 2018 census, and an increase of 24 people (22.9%) since the 2013 census. There were 69 males, 57 females, and 3 people of other genders in 96 dwellings. 4.7% of people identified as LGBTIQ+. The median age was 58.0 years (compared with 38.1 years nationally). There were 9 people (7.0%) aged under 15 years, 15 (11.6%) aged 15 to 29, 60 (46.5%) aged 30 to 64, and 45 (34.9%) aged 65 or older.

People could identify as more than one ethnicity. The results were 88.4% European (Pākehā); 7.0% Māori; 4.7% Asian; 2.3% Middle Eastern, Latin American and African New Zealanders (MELAA); and 9.3% other, which includes people giving their ethnicity as "New Zealander". English was spoken by 97.7%, Māori by 2.3%, and other languages by 9.3%. No language could be spoken by 2.3% (e.g. too young to talk). New Zealand Sign Language was known by 2.3%. The percentage of people born overseas was 11.6, compared with 28.8% nationally.

Religious affiliations were 30.2% Christian, 2.3% Hindu, 2.3% New Age, and 2.3% other religions. People who answered that they had no religion were 51.2%, and 11.6% of people did not answer the census question.

Of those at least 15 years old, 30 (25.0%) people had a bachelor's or higher degree, 66 (55.0%) had a post-high school certificate or diploma, and 18 (15.0%) people exclusively held high school qualifications. The median income was $33,200, compared with $41,500 nationally. 9 people (7.5%) earned over $100,000 compared to 12.1% nationally. The employment status of those at least 15 was 57 (47.5%) full-time and 15 (12.5%) part-time.

== Government ==
Saint Arnaud falls under the Tasman District Council authority. The current mayor of Tasman is Tim King. Nationally, Saint Arnaud falls under the West Coast-Tasman electorate, which is currently held by Damien O'Connor of the Labour Party.

== Amenities ==
Mostly catering for a small number of locals and tramping and skiing tourists, the centre of Saint Arnaud has a village store with postal services, a petrol station, a cafe-restaurant, camping facilities, motels, chalets and specialist accommodation for trampers at the Travers-Sabine Lodge youth hostel. A water taxi service operates from a jetty at the northern end of Lake Rotoiti, near to a DOC campsite at Kerr Bay. There is another campsite at West Bay. A daily shuttle bus service along State Highway 63 provides connections to Nelson, Murchison, Greymouth, Blenheim, Westport and Picton.

The Royal New Zealand Air Force's field training base is nearby at Dip Flat.

== Attractions ==
=== Nelson Lakes National Park ===
The western part of the township includes a local Department of Conservation (DOC) Visitor Centre, with interactive displays and comprehensive information about the wildlife and environmental management of the Nelson Lakes National Park. The centre has a team of professional staff who can offer detailed advice and guidance about all aspects of the area. A number of local footpaths, tracks and nature trails, suitable for all abilities, are maintained by the department.

Saint Arnaud is a starting point for the strenuous 80 km Travers - Sabine tramping circuit. This follows the valley of the Travers River, ascends over the sub-alpine Travers Saddle, the watershed, and then descends the Sabine River valley and gorge to Lake Rotoroa. From here walkers can complete the circuit back to Saint Arnaud by either crossing a low saddle to the valley of Lake Rotoiti, via the Speargrass Track, or by ascending a higher route via Mount Angelus. Alternatively, they can take a water taxi from the DOC Sabine Hut on Lake Rotoroa up to the northern end of the lake.

In winter, snow sports take place primarily at Rainbow Skifield on the eastern side of the Saint Arnaud Range. Other local recreational activities include fishing, hunting, kayaking, small boat sailing, and gliding.

== Infrastructure ==
State Highway 63 passes through Saint Arnaud, linking the town to Blenheim and Marlborough in the east and Murchison and the West Coast in the west. Korere Tophouse Road leaves SH 63 four kilometres east of Saint Arnaud, and provides the most direct route to Richmond and Nelson.

Network Tasman owns and operates the electricity distribution network in Saint Arnaud. Electricity is fed from Transpower's national grid at its Kikiwa substation, 15 km (9 mi) north of the town.

The Tasman District Council operates reticulated stormwater and wastewater systems in Saint Arnaud, but not a reticulated fresh water supply. Individual properties are required to build and maintain their own fresh water supply.

== Education ==
Lake Rotoiti School is the sole school in Saint Arnaud, serving students from years 1 to 8 (ages 5 to 12) with a roll of 17 as of July 2026. It opened in 1949.

The nearest schools offering secondary education are Tapawera Area School and Murchison Area School, 54 km (34 mi) and 59 km (37 mi) away by road respectively.

== Climate ==
According to the Koppen Climate Classification it is a temperate climate (cfb). Despite its altitude of approximately 650m (2,130ft) it rarely has snowfall due to oceanic influences, being near the Cook Strait, compared to other towns in similar altitudes like Lake Tekapo, Arthurs Pass, Mount Cook Village and even Waiouru in the North Island.

Climate data for St Arnaud (1980–2012 normals, extremes 1965–2012)
| Month | Jan | Feb | Mar | Apr | May | Jun | Jul | Aug | Sep | Oct | Nov | Dec | Year |
|---|---|---|---|---|---|---|---|---|---|---|---|---|---|
| Record high °C (°F) | 31.4 (88.5) | 31.3 (88.3) | 29.1 (84.4) | 23.0 (73.4) | 20.0 (68.0) | 16.4 (61.5) | 13.9 (57.0) | 17.5 (63.5) | 24.0 (75.2) | 25.0 (77.0) | 29.9 (85.8) | 30.4 (86.7) | 31.4 (88.5) |
| Mean maximum °C (°F) | 27.7 (81.9) | 26.9 (80.4) | 24.1 (75.4) | 20.2 (68.4) | 16.7 (62.1) | 13.2 (55.8) | 12.2 (54.0) | 14.3 (57.7) | 17.4 (63.3) | 20.9 (69.6) | 23.8 (74.8) | 25.4 (77.7) | 28.4 (83.1) |
| Mean daily maximum °C (°F) | 21.1 (70.0) | 20.9 (69.6) | 18.6 (65.5) | 15.4 (59.7) | 11.9 (53.4) | 9.0 (48.2) | 8.6 (47.5) | 10.0 (50.0) | 12.1 (53.8) | 14.4 (57.9) | 16.8 (62.2) | 18.8 (65.8) | 14.8 (58.6) |
| Daily mean °C (°F) | 14.7 (58.5) | 14.7 (58.5) | 12.7 (54.9) | 9.7 (49.5) | 6.9 (44.4) | 4.1 (39.4) | 3.5 (38.3) | 4.7 (40.5) | 6.8 (44.2) | 8.9 (48.0) | 11.0 (51.8) | 13.2 (55.8) | 9.2 (48.7) |
| Mean daily minimum °C (°F) | 8.5 (47.3) | 8.5 (47.3) | 6.8 (44.2) | 4.0 (39.2) | 1.8 (35.2) | −0.8 (30.6) | −1.6 (29.1) | −0.5 (31.1) | 1.4 (34.5) | 3.5 (38.3) | 5.2 (41.4) | 7.5 (45.5) | 3.7 (38.6) |
| Mean minimum °C (°F) | 2.0 (35.6) | 2.4 (36.3) | −0.4 (31.3) | −2.5 (27.5) | −4.4 (24.1) | −6.3 (20.7) | −6.9 (19.6) | −6.6 (20.1) | −5.2 (22.6) | −3.1 (26.4) | −0.9 (30.4) | 0.8 (33.4) | −7.6 (18.3) |
| Record low °C (°F) | −0.8 (30.6) | −1.6 (29.1) | −3.6 (25.5) | −6.5 (20.3) | −7.2 (19.0) | −10.6 (12.9) | −9.5 (14.9) | −10.1 (13.8) | −7.7 (18.1) | −6.1 (21.0) | −3.6 (25.5) | −3.2 (26.2) | −10.6 (12.9) |
| Average rainfall mm (inches) | 122.9 (4.84) | 105.3 (4.15) | 110.0 (4.33) | 111.1 (4.37) | 126.4 (4.98) | 143.1 (5.63) | 117.1 (4.61) | 121.5 (4.78) | 146.1 (5.75) | 161.4 (6.35) | 127.7 (5.03) | 161.2 (6.35) | 1,553.8 (61.17) |
Source 1: NIWA
Source 2: Metservice

The Skifield, located at a higher elevation:

Climate data for Rainbow Ski Area, 1,540 m
| Month | Jan | Feb | Mar | Apr | May | Jun | Jul | Aug | Sep | Oct | Nov | Dec | Year |
|---|---|---|---|---|---|---|---|---|---|---|---|---|---|
| Mean daily maximum °C (°F) | 14.4 (57.9) | 14.5 (58.1) | 12.8 (55.0) | 10.0 (50.0) | 7.0 (44.6) | 4.5 (40.1) | 3.8 (38.8) | 4.5 (40.1) | 6.7 (44.1) | 8.6 (47.5) | 10.6 (51.1) | 12.7 (54.9) | 9.2 (48.6) |
| Daily mean °C (°F) | 8.8 (47.8) | 8.9 (48.0) | 7.4 (45.3) | 4.8 (40.6) | 1.9 (35.4) | −0.5 (31.1) | −1.2 (29.8) | −0.4 (31.3) | 1.7 (35.1) | 3.5 (38.3) | 5.3 (41.5) | 7.3 (45.1) | 4.0 (39.2) |
| Mean daily minimum °C (°F) | 3.2 (37.8) | 3.3 (37.9) | 2.1 (35.8) | −0.4 (31.3) | −2.3 (27.9) | −5.4 (22.3) | −6.2 (20.8) | −5.2 (22.6) | −3.3 (26.1) | −1.5 (29.3) | 0.1 (32.2) | 2.0 (35.6) | −1.1 (30.0) |
| Average rainfall mm (inches) | 131 (5.2) | 94 (3.7) | 113 (4.4) | 131 (5.2) | 139 (5.5) | 125 (4.9) | 127 (5.0) | 120 (4.7) | 142 (5.6) | 159 (6.3) | 148 (5.8) | 143 (5.6) | 1,572 (61.9) |
Source: Climate-data.org, estimated from the Saint Arnaud weather station.
