= Nelson East =

- Suburb
- Interactive map of Nelson East
- Coordinates: 41°16′35″S 173°17′35″E
- Country: New Zealand
- Region: Nelson
- Ward: Central General Ward; Whakatū Māori Ward
- Electorates: Nelson; Te Tai Tonga (Māori)

Government
  - Territorial Authority: Nelson City Council
  - Nelson City Mayor: Nick Smith
  - Nelson MP: Rachel Boyack
  - Te Tai Tonga MP: Tākuta Ferris
- Time zone: UTC+12 (NZST)
  - Summer (DST): UTC+13 (NZDT)
- Postcode: 7010
- Area code: 03

Nelson East is an inner suburb of Nelson, New Zealand. As its name suggests, it lies to the east of Nelson city centre, along the banks of the Maitai River between the city centre and Maitai. Notable features of Nelson East include Queen's Gardens and the Nelson Marlborough Institute of Technology.

== Demographics ==
Nelson East is part of the Nelson Central-Trafalgar statistical area.

== Education ==
Nelson Central School is a co-educational state primary school for Year 1 to 6 students, with a roll of 377 as of July 2026. It opened in 1878 amalgamating all the schools in the central Nelson area apart from Port School. In 1893, Nelson Central Boys' School opened, and in 1927 it becomes the co-educational Nelson Central School.

St Joseph's School is a co-educational state-integrated Catholic primary school for Year 1 to 8 students, with a roll of 356. It opened as St Mary's School for Girls in 1871, but there was an earlier school on the site opened in 1846. St Mary's was later called Sacred Heart College before becoming St Joseph's.

Maitai School is a co-educational special education school. with a roll of 58. It has existed as a special school since at least 1966.
