= Thomas Renwick =

The Honourable Thomas Renwick
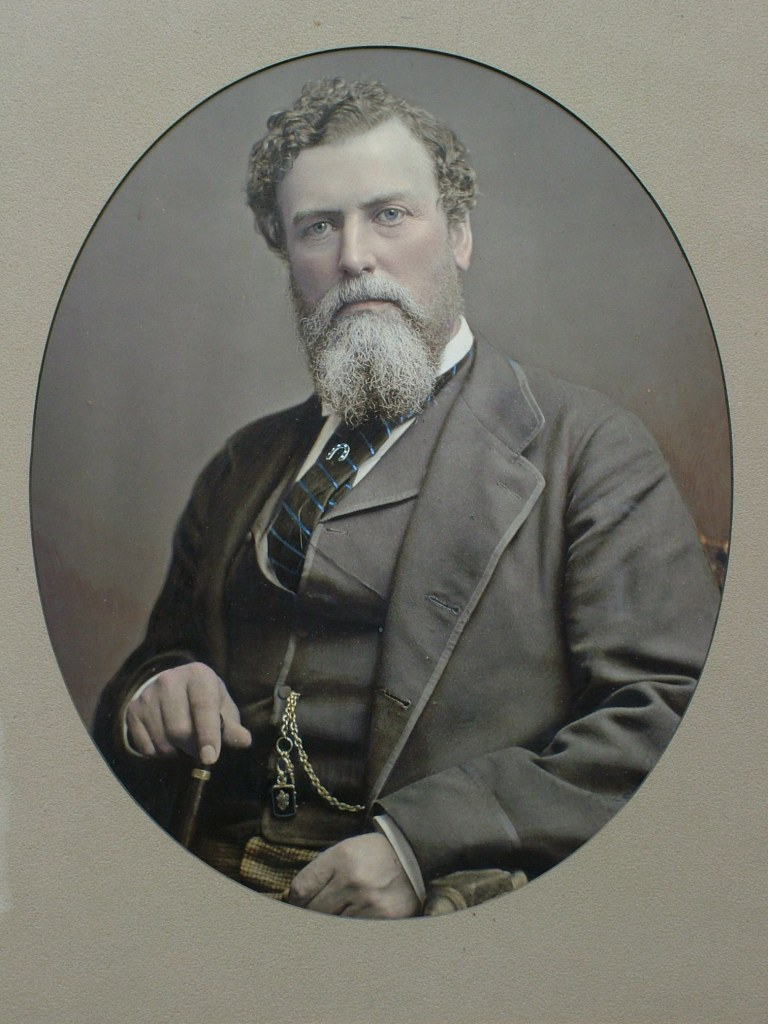

Member of the New Zealand Legislative Council
- In office 15 October 1863 – 28 November 1879

Personal details
- Born: 1818 Dumgree, Dumfries, Scotland
- Died: 28 November 1879 (aged 60–61) Renwick House ("Newstead"), Nelson
- Resting place: Wakapuaka Cemetery
- Spouse(s): Adeline Absolon (m. 1846–1860) Anne Smith (m. 1872)

Dr Thomas Renwick (1818 – 28 November 1879) was an early New Zealand settler in the Nelson and Marlborough regions. He was a member of the New Zealand Legislative Council for 16 years.

== Early life ==
Renwick was born in 1818 in Dumgree, a locality just north of Dumfries in Scotland and not far from Moffat. His parents were Herbert Renwick and Elizabeth Brown, and he had three known elder siblings. He received his medical education in Edinburgh and then practised in Kent, England, for a brief period. He was a ship's doctor on a return journey to India from 1840 to 1841. On 26 May 1842, he sailed as a ship's doctor on the Thomas Harrison to Nelson as part of the New Zealand Company's settlement scheme. They arrived in Nelson on 25 October 1842, with two children having died on the voyage (which is considered a low death rate).

== Life in New Zealand ==
It is believed that Renwick helped the Chinese-born Appo Hocton, who had also arrived on the Thomas Harrison, get off a jail term. Hocton worked as a housekeeper for Renwick in 1843. Renwick established a medical practice in Nelson. From his income, he purchased livestock for farming and financed George Hooper's brewery. On 11 August 1846, he married Adeline Absolon. His wife was wealthy, and this allowed Renwick to purchase land in the Awatere Valley in Marlborough. He freeholded 8,500 hectares (21,000 acres) and named his land Dumgree after his birthplace. The name Dumgree is in use for a hill (645 metres or 2,116 feet) and trig station in the Awatere. In 1855, he bought 4,800 hectares (12,000 acres) of land in the Waihopai Valley from the estate of Constantine Dillon.

After his wife had an affair, she moved to London in 1860. Renwick visited her twice in London, but she was unwilling to return to New Zealand. They signed a deed of separation. Adeline Renwick died in London in 1870. Renwick married Anne Smith in early 1872. They bought a house named Newstead. After Renwick's death, his wife lived there until 1937. Later, the house became known as Renwick House. Still standing, it is part of Nelson Central School.

== Political career ==
Renwick stood in the 1853 New Zealand provincial elections in the Town of Nelson electorate. Of seven candidates for five available positions, he came second (just one vote behind the winner). He was a member of the Nelson Provincial Council during the first two councils from August 1853 to November 1861. From the beginning, he was advocating for the independence of Marlborough from Nelson and in 1859, the Marlborough Province was split off from the Nelson Province. Renwick did not stand for the third provincial council in May 1862 as he was just about to visit England.

When Renwick returned from his first visit to London, he was appointed to the New Zealand Legislative Council from 15 October 1863 to 28 November 1879, when he died.

== Death and commemoration ==
Renwick died on 28 November 1879 at his home. He is buried at Wakapuaka Cemetery. The town of Renwick in Marlborough is named after him after the land was subdivided from his Waihopai property.
