= Antoine Garin =

French Catholic priest and missionary (1810–1889)

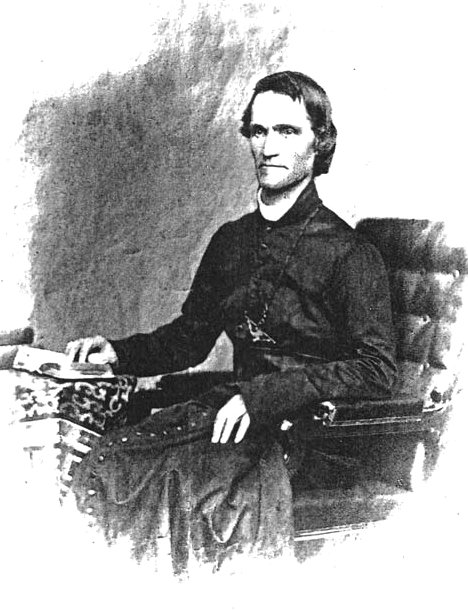
Antoine Garin

Antoine Marie Garin (23 July 1810 – 14 April 1889) was a French Roman Catholic priest, missionary and educationalist who came to New Zealand. He was born in Rambert-en-Bugey, France on 23 July 1810. He ministered in Auckland, Northland and, most notable, in Nelson, New Zealand.

He died in 1889 and was buried at Wakapuaka Cemetery in Nelson.

== Memorials ==
A secondary school, Garin College in Nelson, New Zealand, is named after Antoine Marie Garin. Nelson has a region called Garindale on the way into the city from Blenheim, a Garin Heights at Atawhai, a Garin Grove and an Antoine Grove in Richmond. There is a Garin Way in Mt Wellington, Auckland, and an Espace Antoine Garin in his home town of Saint-Rambert-en-Bugey, Ain, France.
