= Saxton, New Zealand =

Suburb of Nelson, New Zealand

Saxton
- Suburb
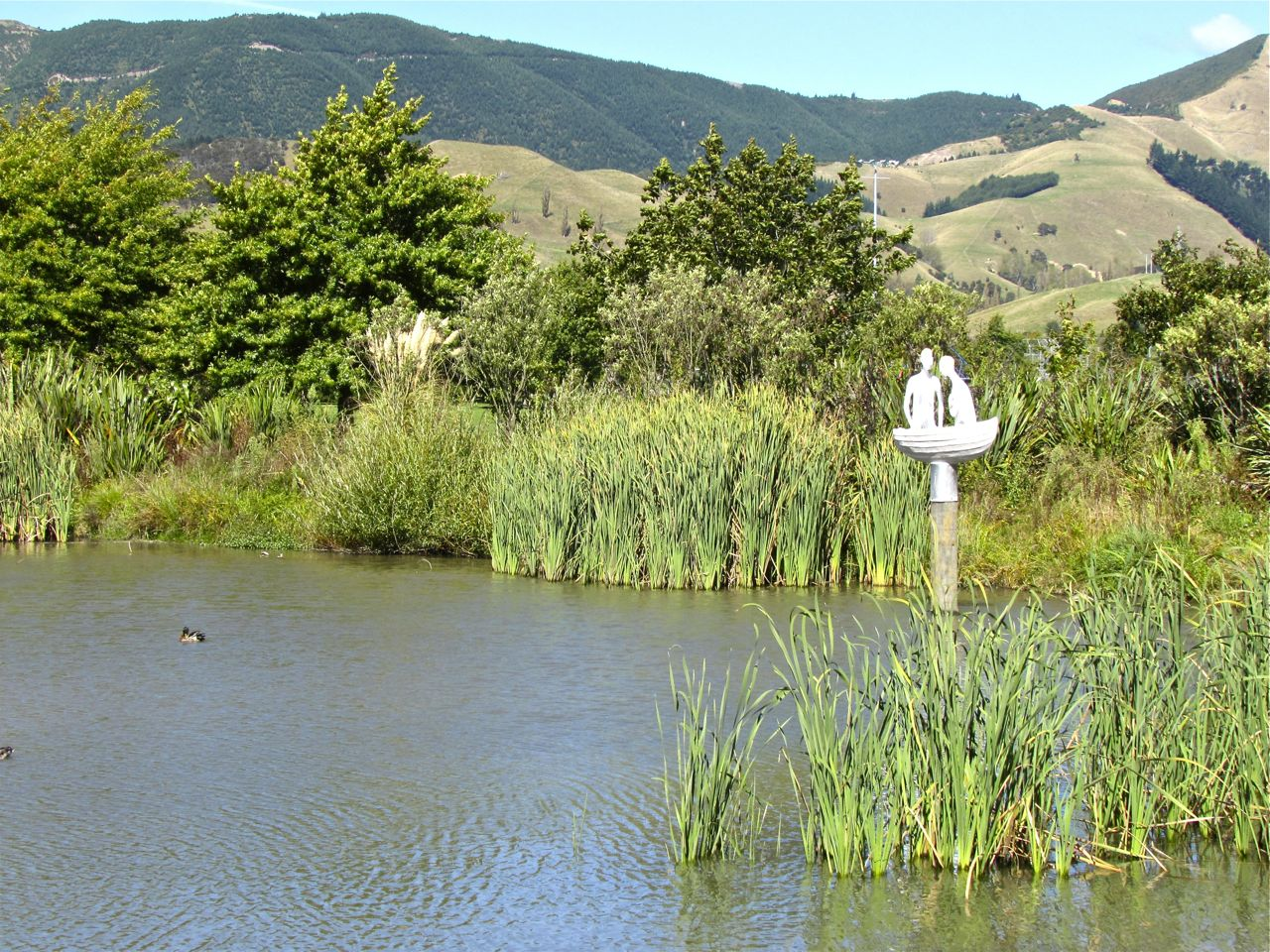
- Saxton Field
- Interactive map of Saxton
- Coordinates: 41°19′30″S 173°13′20″E
- Country: New Zealand
- Region: Nelson
- Ward: Stoke-Tāhunanui General Ward; Whakatū Māori Ward
- Electorates: Nelson; Te Tai Tonga (Māori)

Government
  - Territorial Authority: Nelson City Council
  - Nelson City Mayor: Nick Smith
  - Nelson MP: Rachel Boyack
  - Te Tai Tonga MP: Tākuta Ferris

Area
  - Total: 3.99 km^{2} (1.54 sq mi)
  - Land: 3.99 km^{2} (1.54 sq mi)
  - Water: 0 km^{2} (0 sq mi)

Population (June 2025)
  - Total: 60
  - Density: 15/km^{2} (39/sq mi)
- Time zone: UTC+12 (NZST)
  - Summer (DST): UTC+13 (NZDT)
- Postcode: 7011
- Area code: 03

Saxton is a suburb of Nelson, New Zealand, south of Stoke and northwest of Richmond.

Saxton covers a land area of 3.99 km^{2} (1.54 sq mi). Its principal feature is the Saxton Field sports complex, which includes Saxton Oval – the main cricket ground of Nelson.

The area had a relatively small population at the start of the 21st century, with only 10 residents in 1996 and 20 residents in 2001. The estimated population reached 54 in 2006, 60 in 2013, and 57 in 2018.

== Demography ==
Saxton has an estimated population of 60 as of June 2025, with a population density of 15.0 people per km^{2}.

Historical population
Year	Pop.	±% p.a.
2006	54	—
2013	60	+1.52%
2018	57	−1.02%
2023	66	+2.98%

Saxton had a population of 66 in the 2023 New Zealand census, an increase of 9 people (15.8%) since the 2018 census, and an increase of 6 people (10.0%) since the 2013 census. There were 42 males and 24 females in 30 dwellings. 4.5% of people identified as LGBTIQ+. The median age was 42.2 years (compared with 38.1 years nationally). There were 9 people (13.6%) aged under 15 years, 9 (13.6%) aged 15 to 29, 42 (63.6%) aged 30 to 64, and 6 (9.1%) aged 65 or older.

People could identify as more than one ethnicity. The results were 77.3% European (Pākehā), 27.3% Māori, 4.5% Asian, and 9.1% other, which includes people giving their ethnicity as "New Zealander". English was spoken by 100.0%, Māori by 4.5%, and other languages by 4.5%. The percentage of people born overseas was 9.1, compared with 28.8% nationally.

Religious affiliations were 22.7% Christian, and 4.5% other religions. People who answered that they had no religion were 63.6%, and 4.5% of people did not answer the census question.

Of those at least 15 years old, 6 (10.5%) people had a bachelor's or higher degree, 33 (57.9%) had a post-high school certificate or diploma, and 18 (31.6%) people exclusively held high school qualifications. The median income was $41,800, compared with $41,500 nationally. 3 people (5.3%) earned over $100,000 compared to 12.1% nationally. The employment status of those at least 15 was 30 (52.6%) full-time and 6 (10.5%) part-time.

== Economy ==
In 2018, 7.1% worked in manufacturing, 7.1% worked in transport, 7.1% worked in education, and 7.1% worked in healthcare.

== Transport ==
As of 2018, among those who commuted to work, 57.1% drove a car, 7.1% rode in a car, 14.3% use a bike, and 14.3% walk or run.

No one used public transport.

== Education ==
Garin College, a state-integrated Catholic secondary school for Year 9 to 13 students, is located in Saxton. It has a roll of 634 as of July 2026. It opened in 2002.
