= Renwick, New Zealand =

Town in Marlborough, New Zealand

Renwick
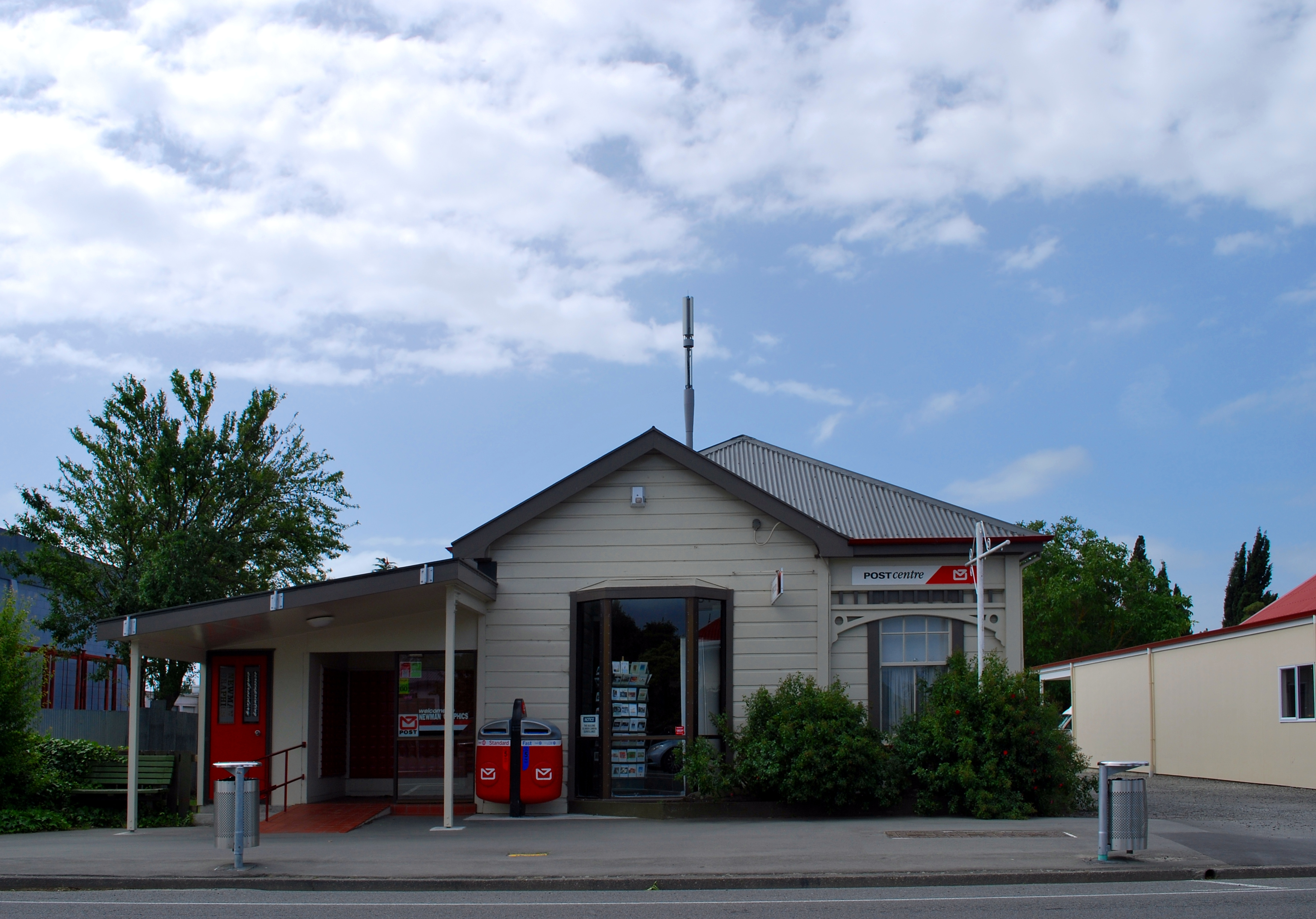
- Renwick Post Office
- Interactive map of Renwick
- Coordinates: 41°30′34″S 173°49′48″E
- Country: New Zealand
- Region: Marlborough
- Ward: Wairau-Awatere General Ward; Marlborough Māori Ward
- Electorates: Kaikōura; Te Tai Tonga (Māori)

Government
  - Territorial Authority: Marlborough District Council
  - Marlborough District Mayor: Nadine Taylor
  - Kaikōura MP: Stuart Smith
  - Te Tai Tonga MP: Tākuta Ferris

Area
  - Total: 2.32 km^{2} (0.90 sq mi)

Population (June 2025)
  - Total: 2,470
  - Density: 1,060/km^{2} (2,760/sq mi)

Renwick is a small town in Marlborough, New Zealand, close to the south bank of the Wairau River. It is located on State Highway 6, 12 kilometres (7 mi) west of Blenheim. Havelock is 31 km (19 mi) north. State Highway 63 runs southwest from Renwick through the Wairau River valley.

The town was initially known as "Upper Wairau", and then as "Renwicktown" after an early landowner, Dr. Thomas Renwick.

Renwick is located in the centre of Marlborough's grape growing region. Sauvignon blanc is the variety usually associated with the area, and famous wineries such as Isabel Estate and Forrest Estate are in close proximity. Pinot Gris (Grey Pinot) is also exported.

== Demographics ==
Renwick is described by Stats NZ as a small urban area and covers 2.32 km^{2} (0.90 sq mi). It had an estimated population of 2,470 as of June 2025, with a population density of 1,065 people per km^{2}.

Historical population
Year	Pop.	±% p.a.
2006	1,962	—
2013	2,253	+2.00%
2018	2,418	+1.42%
2023	2,448	+0.25%

Renwick had a population of 2,448 in the 2023 New Zealand census, an increase of 30 people (1.2%) since the 2018 census, and an increase of 195 people (8.7%) since the 2013 census. There were 1,236 males, 1,200 females, and 12 people of other genders in 933 dwellings. 2.7% of people identified as LGBTIQ+. The median age was 40.9 years (compared with 38.1 years nationally). There were 492 people (20.1%) aged under 15 years, 366 (15.0%) aged 15 to 29, 1,131 (46.2%) aged 30 to 64, and 462 (18.9%) aged 65 or older.

People could identify as more than one ethnicity. The results were 93.1% European (Pākehā); 13.2% Māori; 2.8% Pasifika; 2.0% Asian; 0.5% Middle Eastern, Latin American and African New Zealanders (MELAA); and 2.3% other, which includes people giving their ethnicity as "New Zealander". English was spoken by 97.8%, Māori by 2.1%, Samoan by 0.4%, and other languages by 6.2%. No language could be spoken by 1.6% (e.g. too young to talk). New Zealand Sign Language was known by 0.1%. The percentage of people born overseas was 15.2, compared with 28.8% nationally.

Religious affiliations were 23.4% Christian, 0.1% Islam, 0.6% Māori religious beliefs, 0.2% Buddhist, 0.4% New Age, 0.2% Jewish, and 1.3% other religions. People who answered that they had no religion were 66.5%, and 7.1% of people did not answer the census question.

Of those at least 15 years old, 282 (14.4%) people had a bachelor's or higher degree, 1,179 (60.3%) had a post-high school certificate or diploma, and 495 (25.3%) people exclusively held high school qualifications. The median income was $44,800, compared with $41,500 nationally. 171 people (8.7%) earned over $100,000 compared to 12.1% nationally. The employment status of those at least 15 was 1,080 (55.2%) full-time, 273 (14.0%) part-time, and 33 (1.7%) unemployed.

== Education ==
Renwick School is a coeducational full primary school (years 1–8), with a decile rating of 8 with a role of 424 students (as of July 2026).

The first school in Renwick opened at the beginning of 1861, using the Presbyterian Church as a schoolroom. It was the second school in Marlborough. The present school opened in 1864.
