= Monaco, New Zealand =

Suburb of Nelson, New Zealand

Monaco
- Suburb
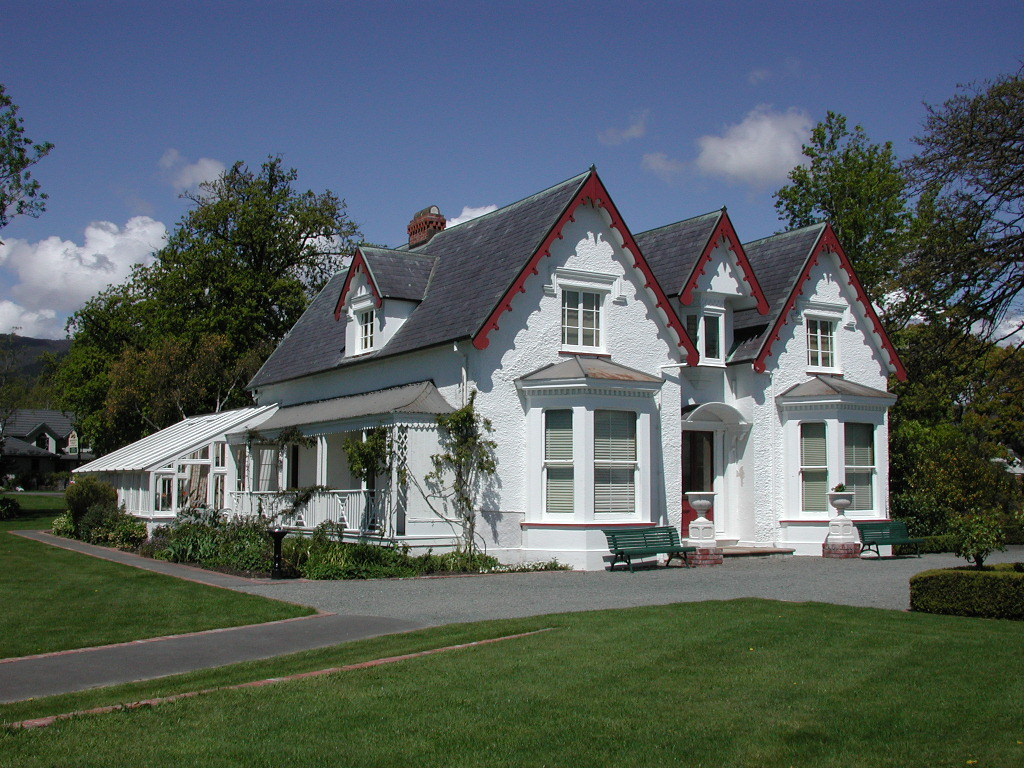
- Broadgreen House
- Interactive map of Monaco
- Coordinates: 41°18′15″S 173°12′40″E
- Country: New Zealand
- Region: Nelson
- Ward: Stoke-Tāhunanui General Ward; Whakatū Māori Ward
- Electorates: Nelson; Te Tai Tonga (Māori)

Government
  - Territorial Authority: Nelson City Council
  - Nelson City Mayor: Nick Smith
  - Nelson MP: Rachel Boyack
  - Te Tai Tonga MP: Tākuta Ferris

Area
  - Total: 0.29 km^{2} (0.11 sq mi)

Population (2023 census)
  - Total: 450
  - Density: 1,600/km^{2} (4,000/sq mi)
- Time zone: UTC+12 (NZST)
  - Summer (DST): UTC+13 (NZDT)
- Postcode: 7010
- Area code: 03

Monaco is a small suburb of Nelson, New Zealand, west of town centre of Stoke. It lies on a narrow peninsula which extends into Tasman Bay / Te Tai-o-Aorere immediately to the south of Nelson Airport, southwest of central Nelson.

== History ==
The estimated population of the Broadgreen-Monaco area was 2,160 in 1996.

It reached 2,190 in 2001 and 2,298 in 2006, held steady at 2,298 in 2013, and then rose to 2,376 in 2018.

== Demography ==
Monaco covers an area of 0.29 km^{2} (0.11 sq mi). It is part of the larger Broadgreen-Monaco statistical area.

Historical population for Monaco
Year	Pop.	±% p.a.
2006	405	—
2013	420	+0.52%
2018	408	−0.58%
2023	450	+1.98%

Monaco had a population of 450 in the 2023 New Zealand census, an increase of 42 people (10.3%) since the 2018 census, and an increase of 30 people (7.1%) since the 2013 census. There were 225 males and 234 females in 228 dwellings. 2.7% of people identified as LGBTIQ+. There were 54 people (12.0%) aged under 15 years, 60 (13.3%) aged 15 to 29, 246 (54.7%) aged 30 to 64, and 96 (21.3%) aged 65 or older.

People could identify as more than one ethnicity. The results were 90.7% European (Pākehā); 8.0% Māori; 0.7% Pasifika; 4.7% Asian; 2.0% Middle Eastern, Latin American and African New Zealanders (MELAA); and 4.0% other, which includes people giving their ethnicity as "New Zealander". English was spoken by 98.0%, Māori by 1.3%, Samoan by 0.7%, and other languages by 12.0%. No language could be spoken by 1.3% (e.g. too young to talk). The percentage of people born overseas was 28.7, compared with 28.8% nationally.

Religious affiliations were 30.7% Christian, 0.7% Buddhist, 1.3% New Age, and 2.0% other religions. People who answered that they had no religion were 57.3%, and 8.7% of people did not answer the census question.

Of those at least 15 years old, 123 (31.1%) people had a bachelor's or higher degree, 201 (50.8%) had a post-high school certificate or diploma, and 75 (18.9%) people exclusively held high school qualifications. 42 people (10.6%) earned over $100,000 compared to 12.1% nationally. The employment status of those at least 15 was 213 (53.8%) full-time, 60 (15.2%) part-time, and 6 (1.5%) unemployed.

=== Broadgreen-Monaco statistical area ===
The Broadgreen-Monaco statistical area covers 1.14 km^{2} (0.44 sq mi) and had an estimated population of 2,550 as of June 2025, with a population density of 2,237 people per km^{2}.

Historical population for Broadgreen-Monaco
Year	Pop.	±% p.a.
2006	2,298	—
2013	2,298	+0.00%
2018	2,376	+0.67%
2023	2,463	+0.72%

Broadgreen-Monaco had a population of 2,463 in the 2023 New Zealand census, an increase of 87 people (3.7%) since the 2018 census, and an increase of 165 people (7.2%) since the 2013 census. There were 1,185 males, 1,269 females, and 9 people of other genders in 966 dwellings. 2.7% of people identified as LGBTIQ+. The median age was 40.9 years (compared with 38.1 years nationally). There were 447 people (18.1%) aged under 15 years, 447 (18.1%) aged 15 to 29, 1,104 (44.8%) aged 30 to 64, and 468 (19.0%) aged 65 or older.

People could identify as more than one ethnicity. The results were 84.8% European (Pākehā); 14.5% Māori; 5.4% Pasifika; 6.0% Asian; 1.1% Middle Eastern, Latin American and African New Zealanders (MELAA); and 2.3% other, which includes people giving their ethnicity as "New Zealander". English was spoken by 97.1%, Māori by 3.9%, Samoan by 1.1%, and other languages by 9.9%. No language could be spoken by 1.7% (e.g. too young to talk). New Zealand Sign Language was known by 1.0%. The percentage of people born overseas was 21.2, compared with 28.8% nationally.

Religious affiliations were 28.0% Christian, 0.6% Hindu, 0.2% Islam, 0.4% Māori religious beliefs, 0.5% Buddhist, 0.9% New Age, and 1.7% other religions. People who answered that they had no religion were 58.8%, and 9.4% of people did not answer the census question.

Of those at least 15 years old, 360 (17.9%) people had a bachelor's or higher degree, 1,134 (56.2%) had a post-high school certificate or diploma, and 522 (25.9%) people exclusively held high school qualifications. The median income was $39,400, compared with $41,500 nationally. 123 people (6.1%) earned over $100,000 compared to 12.1% nationally. The employment status of those at least 15 was 1,017 (50.4%) full-time, 303 (15.0%) part-time, and 39 (1.9%) unemployed.

== Economy ==
In 2018, 12.7% of people in the statistical area worked in manufacturing, 9.2% worked in construction, 6.2% worked in hospitality, 6.2% worked in transport, 9.2% worked in education, and 12.2% worked in healthcare.

== Transport ==
As of 2018, among those who commuted to work, 71.6% drove a car, 3.8% rode in a car, 2.4% use a bike, and 2.4% walk or run.

No one used public transport.

== Education ==
Birchwood School is a co-educational state primary school for Year 1 to 6 students. It has a roll of 234 as of July 2026. It opened in 1976.
