= Nelson South =

Suburb of Nelson, New Zealand

- Suburb
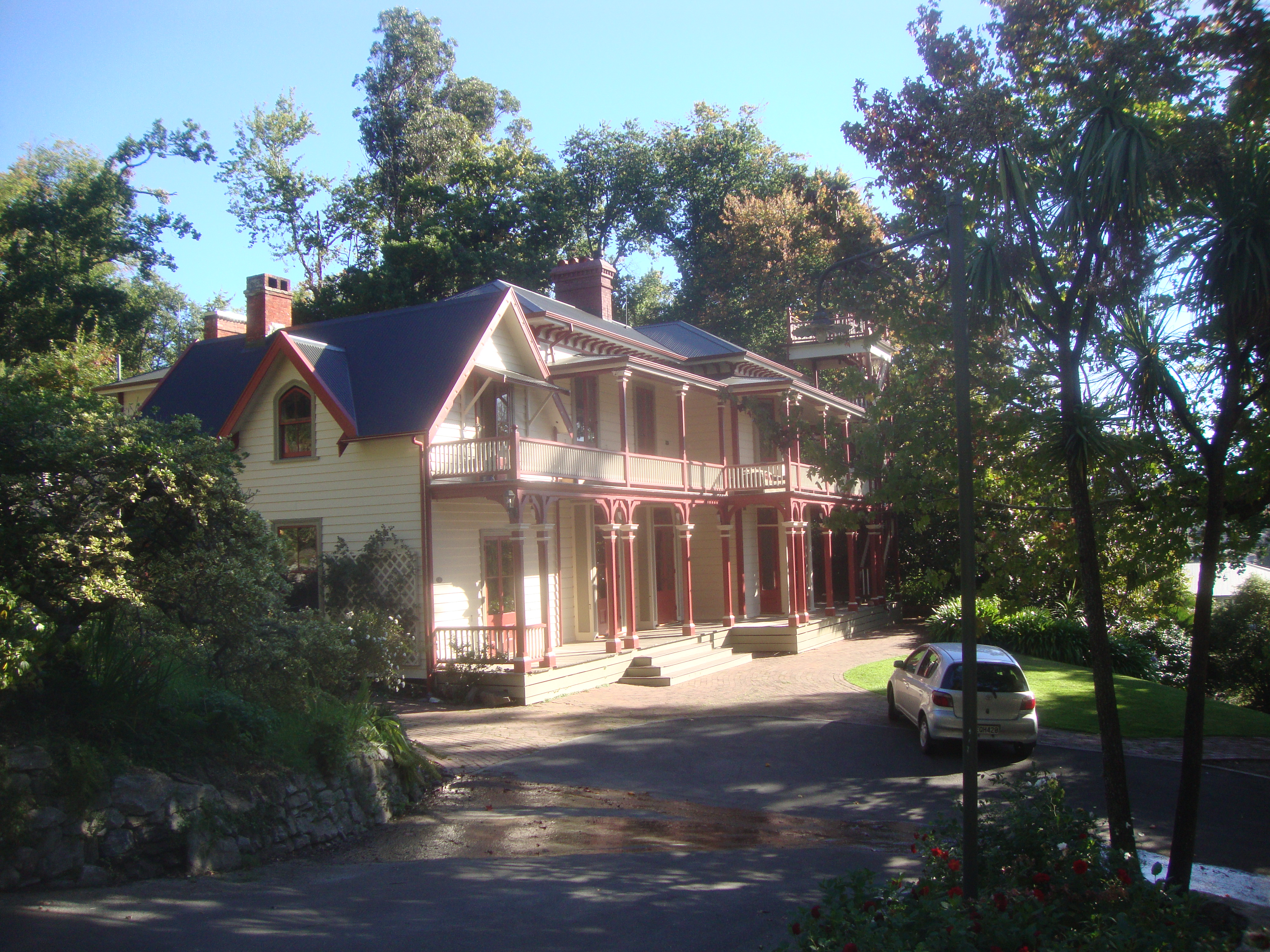
- Fairfield House
- Interactive map of Nelson South
- Coordinates: 41°17′15″S 173°16′30″E
- Country: New Zealand
- Region: Nelson
- Ward: Central Ward; Whakatū Māori Ward
- Electorates: Nelson; Te Tai Tonga (Māori)

Government
  - Territorial Authority: Nelson City Council
  - Nelson City Mayor: Nick Smith
  - Nelson MP: Rachel Boyack
  - Te Tai Tonga MP: Tākuta Ferris

Area
  - Total: 1.21 km^{2} (0.47 sq mi)

Population (June 2025)
  - Total: 2,610
  - Density: 2,160/km^{2} (5,590/sq mi)
- Time zone: UTC+12 (NZST)
  - Summer (DST): UTC+13 (NZDT)
- Postcode: 7010
- Area code: 03

Nelson South is an inner suburb of Nelson, New Zealand. It lies to the southwest of Nelson city centre, between it and Bishopdale, close to the foot of The Grampians. The main inland route to Stoke, New Zealand, Waimea Road, is Nelson South's main road.

The suburb includes both Nelson Hospital and Nelson College.

It also has six public reserves: Fairfield Park, the Melrose Gardens, Ronaki Reserve, Waimea North Reserve, Wellington Reserve and Wigzell Park.

== Demographics ==
The Rutherford statistical area, which corresponds to the northern part of Nelson South, covers 1.21 km^{2} (0.47 sq mi). It had an estimated population of 2,610 as of June 2025, with a population density of 2,157 people per km^{2}.

Historical population
Year	Pop.	±% p.a.
2006	2,475	—
2013	2,490	+0.09%
2018	2,583	+0.74%
2023	2,547	−0.28%

Rutherford had a population of 2,547 in the 2023 New Zealand census, a decrease of 36 people (−1.4%) since the 2018 census, and an increase of 57 people (2.3%) since the 2013 census. There were 1,245 males, 1,290 females, and 15 people of other genders in 1,017 dwellings. 4.9% of people identified as LGBTIQ+. The median age was 44.2 years (compared with 38.1 years nationally). There were 420 people (16.5%) aged under 15 years, 411 (16.1%) aged 15 to 29, 1,221 (47.9%) aged 30 to 64, and 495 (19.4%) aged 65 or older.

People could identify as more than one ethnicity. The results were 84.9% European (Pākehā); 8.8% Māori; 2.9% Pasifika; 10.0% Asian; 1.6% Middle Eastern, Latin American and African New Zealanders (MELAA); and 1.8% other, which includes people giving their ethnicity as "New Zealander". English was spoken by 97.3%, Māori by 2.0%, Samoan by 0.6%, and other languages by 16.0%. No language could be spoken by 1.4% (e.g. too young to talk). New Zealand Sign Language was known by 0.1%. The percentage of people born overseas was 33.2, compared with 28.8% nationally.

Religious affiliations were 24.7% Christian, 1.8% Hindu, 0.6% Islam, 0.4% Māori religious beliefs, 1.8% Buddhist, 0.7% New Age, 0.2% Jewish, and 1.4% other religions. People who answered that they had no religion were 62.7%, and 6.4% of people did not answer the census question.

Of those at least 15 years old, 849 (39.9%) people had a bachelor's or higher degree, 921 (43.3%) had a post-high school certificate or diploma, and 354 (16.6%) people exclusively held high school qualifications. The median income was $41,000, compared with $41,500 nationally. 294 people (13.8%) earned over $100,000 compared to 12.1% nationally. The employment status of those at least 15 was 1,008 (47.4%) full-time, 384 (18.1%) part-time, and 48 (2.3%) unemployed.

== Education ==
=== Nelson College campus ===
Nelson College is a state secondary school for Year 9 to 13 boys, with a roll of 1,024 as of July 2026. It opened in 1856 as a private school. A fire destroyed the school in 1904, but the school continued in various temporary locations until a rebuild was ready in 1907. In the 1929 Murchison earthquake, the new building was destroyed. The school continued in temporary buildings on the school grounds until a new rebuild opened in 1942.

Nelson College Preparatory School is a private preparatory school for Year 7 to 8 boys, located on the Nelson College Campus. It has a roll of 93.

=== Other schools ===
Hampden Street School is a co-educational state primary school for Year 1 to 6 students, with a roll of 435 as of July 2026. It opened in 1868 as a co-educational side school for Nelson Girls Central School. It was destroyed by a fire in 1892, and rebuilt.

Victory Primary School is also a co-educational state primary school for Year 1 to 6 students, with a roll of 360. It opened in 1949.

Nelson Intermediate - Te Kura Tūwaenga o Whakatū is a co-educational state intermediate school for Year 7 and 8 students, with a roll of 415. It opened in 1951.
