= State Highway 63 (New Zealand) =

Road in New Zealand

State Highway 63

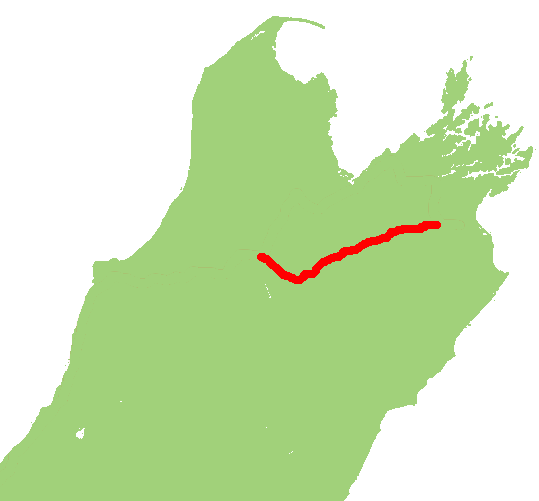

Route information
- Maintained by NZ Transport Agency
- Length: 117 km (73 mi)

Major junctions
- Northeast end: SH 6 (Middle Renwick Road/Blenheim Street) at Renwick
- Southwest end: SH 6 at Kawatiri Junction

Location
- Country: New Zealand
- Primary destinations: Hillersden, Tophouse, Saint Arnaud, Lake Rotoiti

Highway system
- New Zealand state highways; Motorways and expressways; List
← SH 62	→ SH 65

State Highway 63 (SH 63) is a state highway located in the northern parts of the South Island of New Zealand. It is 117 km long and runs between the settlements of Renwick (in Marlborough region) and Kawatiri Junction (in the Tasman region) via Saint Arnaud, providing a bypass of the city of Nelson. Despite being a convenient link between the West Coast and Marlborough, and being a relatively straight highway along most of its length, it is only classified by the NZTA as a secondary collector highway.

== Route ==
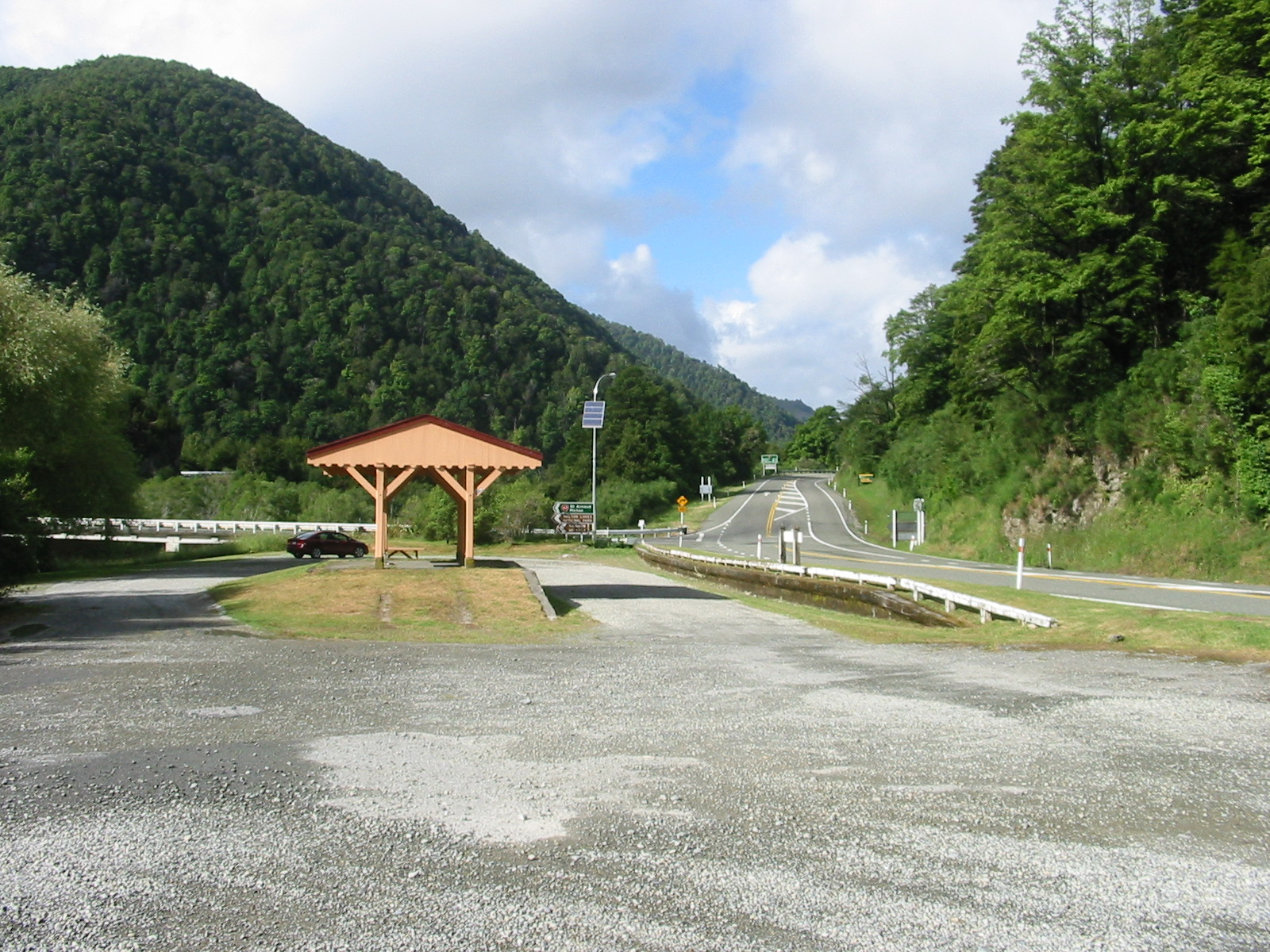
SH 63 beginning at Kawatiri Junction.

SH 63 begins just to the east of Renwick at SH 6, and parallels the course of the Wairau River for 93 kilometres, initially to the south of the river before crossing to the north side about 20 km from the Marlborough/Tasman border, while passing through the settlements of Wairau Valley, Hillersden and Tophouse. Just before reaching Tophouse, the Wairau River veers to the south while the road arrives in St. Arnaud at the shores of Lake Rotoiti. After St. Arnaud the road swings to the northwest and follows the last 24 km alongside the Buller River. At Kawatiri Junction, it terminates at SH 6 between Murchison and the Hope Saddle.

== See also ==
- List of New Zealand state highways
