= Tophouse =

Locality in Tasman District, New Zealand

- Interactive map of Tophouse
- Coordinates: 41°46′S 172°54′E
- Country: New Zealand
- Territorial authority: Tasman
- Ward: Lakes-Murchison
- Electorates: West Coast-Tasman; Te Tai Tonga (Māori)

Government
  - Territorial Authority: Tasman District Council
  - Mayor of Tasman: Tim King
  - West Coast-Tasman MP: Maureen Pugh
  - Te Tai Tonga MP: Tākuta Ferris

Area
  - Total: 20.23 km^{2} (7.81 sq mi)

Population (2023 census)
  - Total: 102
  - Density: 5.04/km^{2} (13.1/sq mi)
- Time zone: UTC+12 (NZST)
  - Summer (DST): UTC+13 (NZDT)

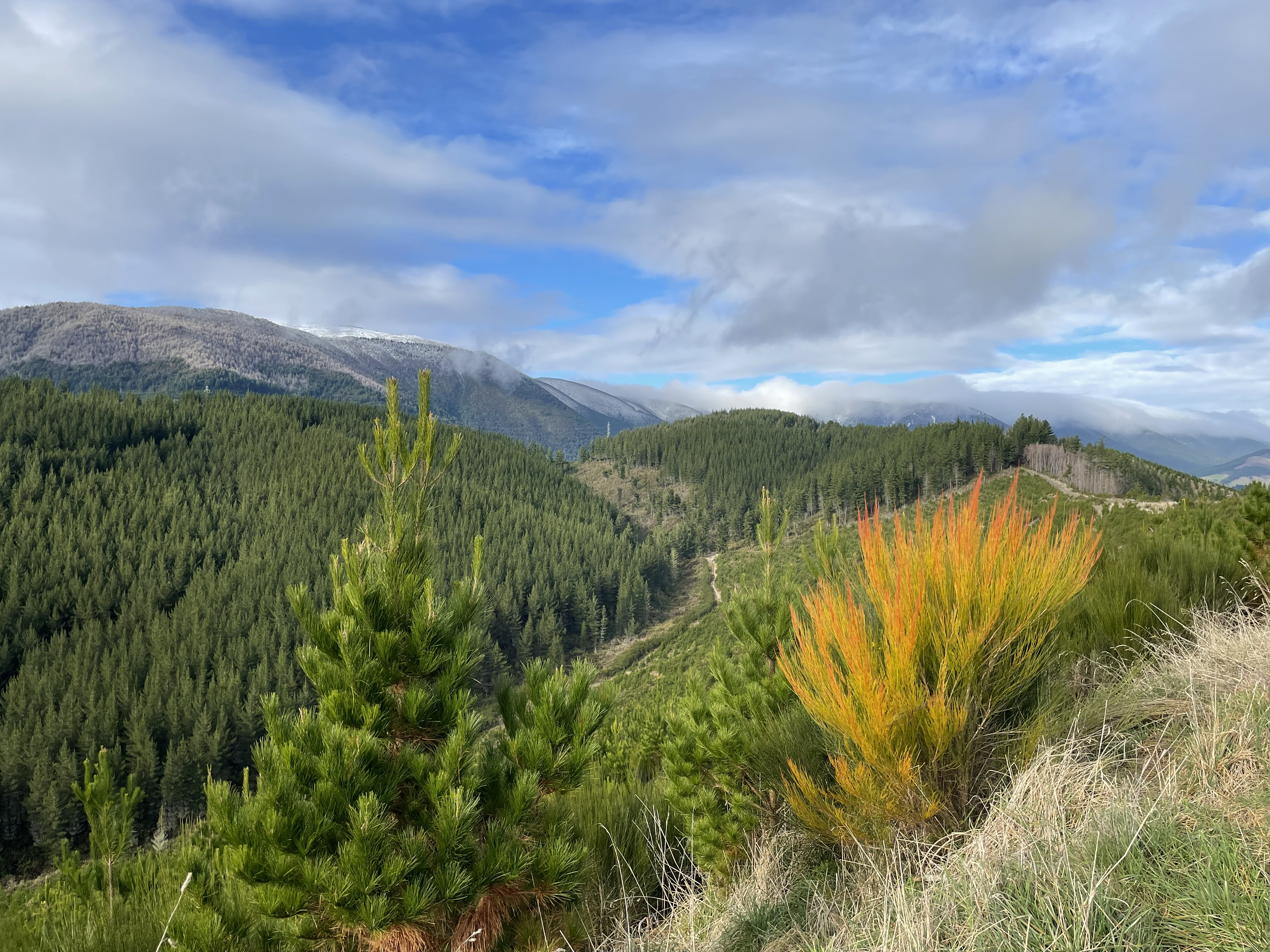
A view of the rugged landscape just north of Tophouse.

Tophouse, also known as Tophouse Settlement, is a rural locality in the Tasman District of New Zealand's South Island, some 8 km northeast of Saint Arnaud. It is named after a hotel established in the 19th century to service drovers transporting their sheep between Canterbury and Marlborough. The hotel is still in operation today and has an eventful history, including a double murder suicide in October 1894 (see below). For many years, "Tophouse" referred specifically to the hotel, but it has also been used to refer to the general vicinity, and on 20 February 2001, the New Zealand Geographic Board assigned the name "Tophouse Settlement" to the area.

Tophouse is located near State Highway 63. There were also plans to establish a significant railway junction in Tophouse. One plan from the 1880s for the route of the Main North Line from Christchurch to Marlborough and Nelson proposed extending the Waiau Branch line (then terminated in Culverden) via Hanmer Springs to Tophouse, and then building one branch down the Wairau River valley to Blenheim and another to Nelson. This proposal remained under consideration until the 1930s, when a coastal route via Parnassus and Kaikōura was chosen instead of the inland Tophouse route.

Tophouse had a school which opened in 1914 but has since closed.

== The Tophouse Tragedy ==
What became known as the "Tophouse Tragedy" occurred in October 1894, when the owners of the hotel, Nathaniel and Louisa Longney, were away in Blenheim, having left their cousin, John Lane, in charge of the business, and a governess, Miss Catherine Wylie, looking after their three children. The brother of Mrs Longney, a Mr William (Bill) Bateman, who was rumoured to have been trying unsuccessfully to court Miss Wylie, heard of this arrangement and apparently became jealous.

Bateman travelled to the Tophouse hotel, arriving on the evening of Thursday, October 4, and convinced Lane to go out rabbit shooting with him. He then shot Lane in the back of the head, and dragged his body into the bushes. Bateman then went the 300m to the nearby telegraph station, and told the telegraphist, William Wallis, that Lane wanted to talk to him. When Wallis accompanied Bateman, he too was shot, his body being concealed under a horse-cover. During the night, Bateman repeatedly threatened Miss Wylie and Mrs Wallis, who locked herself in the telegraph station and tried to call for help, but did not shoot either woman.

When the police arrived the following evening, alerted by Mrs Wallis' attempts at calling for help, they found Bateman on the verandah of the hotel, having shot himself in the head with his muzzle-loading shotgun. To accomplish this he had removed his shoes and socks and placed his toe on the trigger, putting the barrel of the gun under his chin. The shot went through his head, and the blast holes can still be seen in the roof-boards of the verandah even today.

== Demographics ==
Tophouse locality covers 20.23 km^{2} (7.81 sq mi). It is part of the larger Murchison-Nelson Lakes statistical area.

Historical population
Year	Pop.	±% p.a.
2006	72	—
2013	75	+0.58%
2018	93	+4.40%
2023	102	+1.86%

Tophouse had a population of 102 in the 2023 New Zealand census, an increase of 9 people (9.7%) since the 2018 census, and an increase of 27 people (36.0%) since the 2013 census. There were 54 males and 48 females in 48 dwellings. The median age was 54.3 years (compared with 38.1 years nationally). There were 12 people (11.8%) aged under 15 years, 3 (2.9%) aged 15 to 29, 57 (55.9%) aged 30 to 64, and 30 (29.4%) aged 65 or older.

People could identify as more than one ethnicity. The results were 97.1% European (Pākehā), 2.9% Māori, and 5.9% other, which includes people giving their ethnicity as "New Zealander". English was spoken by 100.0%, and other languages by 11.8%. No language could be spoken by 2.9% (e.g. too young to talk). The percentage of people born overseas was 17.6, compared with 28.8% nationally.

The sole religious affiliation given was 23.5% Christian. People who answered that they had no religion were 61.8%, and 8.8% of people did not answer the census question.

Of those at least 15 years old, 24 (26.7%) people had a bachelor's or higher degree, 45 (50.0%) had a post-high school certificate or diploma, and 18 (20.0%) people exclusively held high school qualifications. The median income was $29,600, compared with $41,500 nationally. 12 people (13.3%) earned over $100,000 compared to 12.1% nationally. The employment status of those at least 15 was 39 (43.3%) full-time and 18 (20.0%) part-time.
