= Nayland, New Zealand =

Suburb of Nelson, New Zealand

Nayland
- Suburb
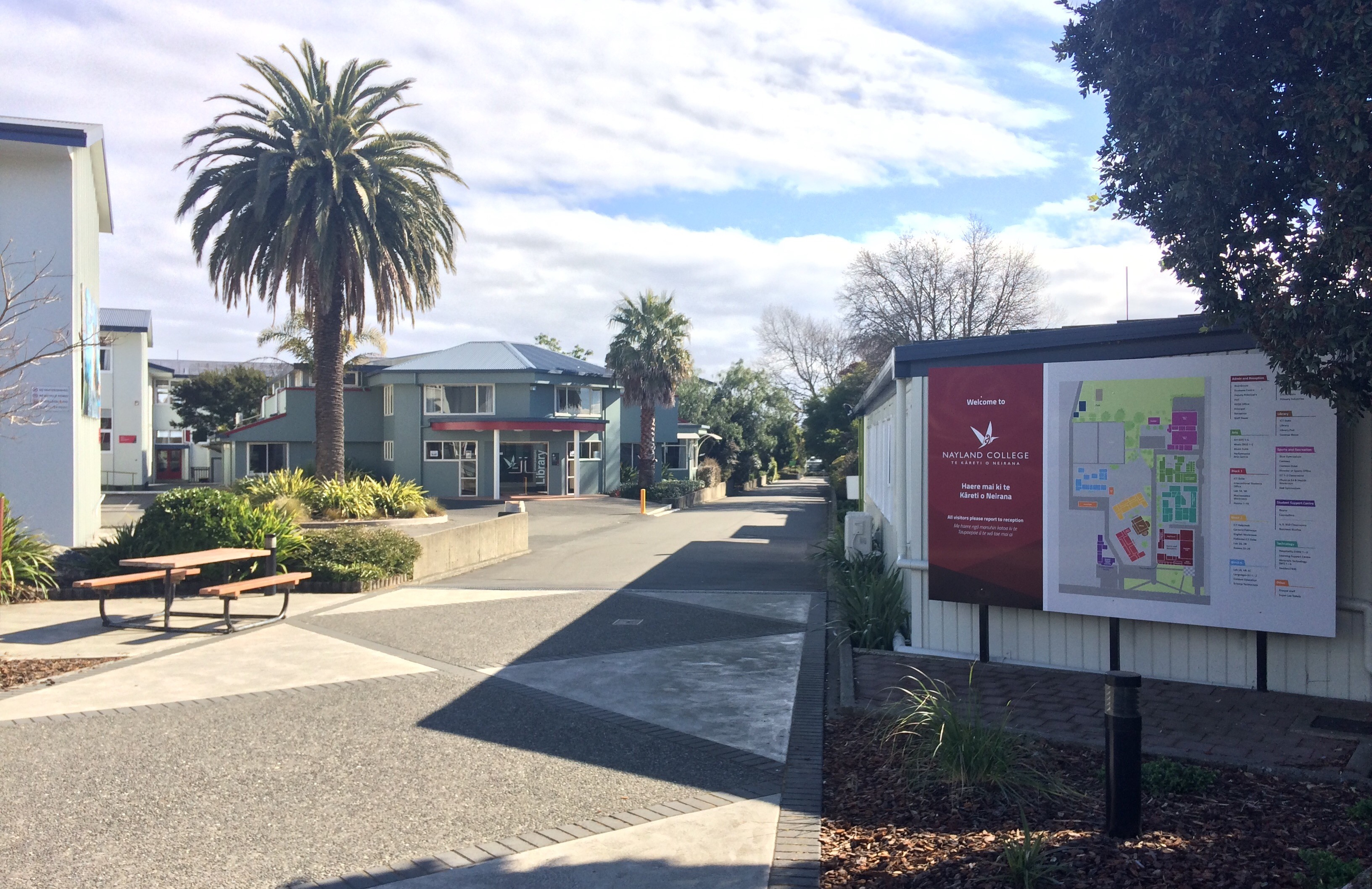
- Nayland College
- Interactive map of Nayland
- Coordinates: 41°18′20″S 173°14′00″E
- Country: New Zealand
- Region: Nelson
- Ward: Stoke-Tāhunanui General Ward; Whakatū Māori Ward
- Electorates: Nelson; Te Tai Tonga (Māori)

Government
  - Territorial Authority: Nelson City Council
  - Nelson City Mayor: Nick Smith
  - Nelson MP: Rachel Boyack
  - Te Tai Tonga MP: Tākuta Ferris

Area
  - Total: 0.84 km^{2} (0.32 sq mi)
  - Land: 0.84 km^{2} (0.32 sq mi)
  - Water: 0 km^{2} (0 sq mi)

Population (June 2025)
  - Total: 2,190
  - Density: 2,600/km^{2} (6,800/sq mi)
- Time zone: UTC+12 (NZST)
  - Summer (DST): UTC+13 (NZDT)
- Postcode: 7011
- Area code: 03

Nayland is a suburb of Stoke, New Zealand. It lies to the north of Stoke, close to Nelson Airport, southwest of Nelson city centre.

== Geography ==
Nayland covers an area of 0.84 km².

== History ==
The estimated population of Nayland reached 1,600 in 1996.

It reached 1,630 in 2001, 1,632 in 2006, 1,725 in 2013, and 1,899 in 2018.

== Demography ==
Nayland statistical area had an estimated population of 2,190 as of June 2025, with a population density of 2,607 people per km^{2}.

Historical population
Year	Pop.	±% p.a.
2006	1,632	—
2013	1,725	+0.79%
2018	1,899	+1.94%
2023	2,097	+2.00%

Nayland had a population of 2,097 in the 2023 New Zealand census, an increase of 198 people (10.4%) since the 2018 census, and an increase of 372 people (21.6%) since the 2013 census. There were 1,020 males, 1,074 females, and 6 people of other genders in 780 dwellings. 3.0% of people identified as LGBTIQ+. The median age was 37.7 years (compared with 38.1 years nationally). There were 426 people (20.3%) aged under 15 years, 375 (17.9%) aged 15 to 29, 993 (47.4%) aged 30 to 64, and 306 (14.6%) aged 65 or older.

People could identify as more than one ethnicity. The results were 83.3% European (Pākehā); 13.0% Māori; 5.0% Pasifika; 9.6% Asian; 1.4% Middle Eastern, Latin American and African New Zealanders (MELAA); and 2.7% other, which includes people giving their ethnicity as "New Zealander". English was spoken by 96.4%, Māori by 2.7%, Samoan by 0.6%, and other languages by 11.3%. No language could be spoken by 2.4% (e.g. too young to talk). New Zealand Sign Language was known by 0.6%. The percentage of people born overseas was 22.0, compared with 28.8% nationally.

Religious affiliations were 29.3% Christian, 0.7% Hindu, 0.6% Islam, 0.1% Māori religious beliefs, 1.1% Buddhist, 0.4% New Age, 0.1% Jewish, and 1.9% other religions. People who answered that they had no religion were 57.7%, and 8.2% of people did not answer the census question.

Of those at least 15 years old, 321 (19.2%) people had a bachelor's or higher degree, 891 (53.3%) had a post-high school certificate or diploma, and 459 (27.5%) people exclusively held high school qualifications. The median income was $41,200, compared with $41,500 nationally. 111 people (6.6%) earned over $100,000 compared to 12.1% nationally. The employment status of those at least 15 was 927 (55.5%) full-time, 246 (14.7%) part-time, and 33 (2.0%) unemployed.

== Economy ==
In 2018, 12.9% worked in manufacturing, 9.7% worked in construction, 6.6% worked in hospitality, 6.6% worked in transport, 7.1% worked in education, and 11.4% worked in healthcare.

== Transport ==
As of 2018, among those who commuted to work, 71.1% drove a car, 4.0% rode in a car, 6.6% use a bike, and 6.6% walk or run.

No one used public transport.

== Education ==
Nayland College is a co-educational state secondary school for Year 9 to 13 students, with a roll of 1,275 as of July 2026. It opened in 1966.

Nayland Primary School is a co-educational state primary school for Year 1 to 6 students, with a roll of 366. It opened in 1961.

Broadgreen Intermediate is a co-educational state intermediate school for Year 7 to 8 students, with a roll of 485. It opened in 1971.
