= Enner Glynn =

- Suburb
- Interactive map of Enner Glynn
- Coordinates: 41°18′27″S 173°15′10″E
- Country: New Zealand
- Region: Nelson
- Territorial authority: Nelson

Government
  - Nelson City Mayor: Nick Smith
  - Nelson MP: Rachel Boyack
  - Te Tai Tonga MP: Tākuta Ferris

Area
  - Total: 7.40 km^{2} (2.86 sq mi)
  - Land: 7.40 km^{2} (2.86 sq mi)
  - Water: 0 km^{2} (0 sq mi)

Population (June 2025)
  - Total: 3,140
  - Density: 424/km^{2} (1,100/sq mi)
- Time zone: UTC+12 (NZST)
  - Summer (DST): UTC+13 (NZDT)
- Postcode: 7011
- Area code: 03

Enner Glynn is a suburb of Nelson, New Zealand. It lies to the south of Nelson city centre and east of Stoke, inland from Wakatu.

== Geography ==
Enner Glynn covers an area of 7.40 km^{2}.

The suburb has two local parks: Jenkins Creek Esplanade and Enner Glynn North Reserve.

== History ==
The estimated population of Enner Glynn reached 2,360 in 1996.

It reached 2,430 in 2001, 2,790 in 2006, 2,700 in 2013, and 2,810 in 2018.

== Demography ==
Enner Glynn covers 7.40 km^{2} (2.86 sq mi) and had an estimated population of 3,140 as of June 2025, with a population density of 424 people per km^{2}.

Historical population
Year	Pop.	±% p.a.
2006	2,706	—
2013	2,760	+0.28%
2018	2,916	+1.11%
2023	2,964	+0.33%

Enner Glynn had a population of 2,964 in the 2023 New Zealand census, an increase of 48 people (1.6%) since the 2018 census, and an increase of 204 people (7.4%) since the 2013 census. There were 1,494 males, 1,455 females, and 15 people of other genders in 1,143 dwellings. 3.1% of people identified as LGBTIQ+. The median age was 42.1 years (compared with 38.1 years nationally). There were 483 people (16.3%) aged under 15 years, 525 (17.7%) aged 15 to 29, 1,467 (49.5%) aged 30 to 64, and 489 (16.5%) aged 65 or older.

People could identify as more than one ethnicity. The results were 86.7% European (Pākehā); 11.7% Māori; 1.6% Pasifika; 8.1% Asian; 1.3% Middle Eastern, Latin American and African New Zealanders (MELAA); and 2.4% other, which includes people giving their ethnicity as "New Zealander". English was spoken by 97.7%, Māori by 2.4%, Samoan by 0.3%, and other languages by 10.6%. No language could be spoken by 1.8% (e.g. too young to talk). New Zealand Sign Language was known by 0.5%. The percentage of people born overseas was 22.8, compared with 28.8% nationally.

Religious affiliations were 27.9% Christian, 1.5% Hindu, 0.8% Islam, 0.4% Māori religious beliefs, 0.9% Buddhist, 0.3% New Age, and 1.4% other religions. People who answered that they had no religion were 60.3%, and 6.4% of people did not answer the census question.

Of those at least 15 years old, 630 (25.4%) people had a bachelor's or higher degree, 1,392 (56.1%) had a post-high school certificate or diploma, and 465 (18.7%) people exclusively held high school qualifications. The median income was $45,400, compared with $41,500 nationally. 246 people (9.9%) earned over $100,000 compared to 12.1% nationally. The employment status of those at least 15 was 1,356 (54.7%) full-time, 411 (16.6%) part-time, and 36 (1.5%) unemployed.

== Economy ==
In 2018, 11.4% worked in manufacturing, 9.7% worked in construction, 4.9% worked in hospitality, 5.2% worked in transport, 0.0% worked in finance and administration, 7.6% worked in education, and 13.7% worked in healthcare.

== Transport ==
As of 2018, among those who commute to work, 75.1% drove a car, 6.8% rode in a car, 3.7% use a bike, and 3.7% walk or run.

No one uses public transport.

== Education ==
Enner Glynn School is a co-educational state primary school for Year 1 to 6 students. It has a roll of 313 as of July 2026. The school has existed at least since 1960.
