= Stoke, New Zealand =

Suburb of Nelson, New Zealand

Stoke Omaio (Māori)
- Suburb
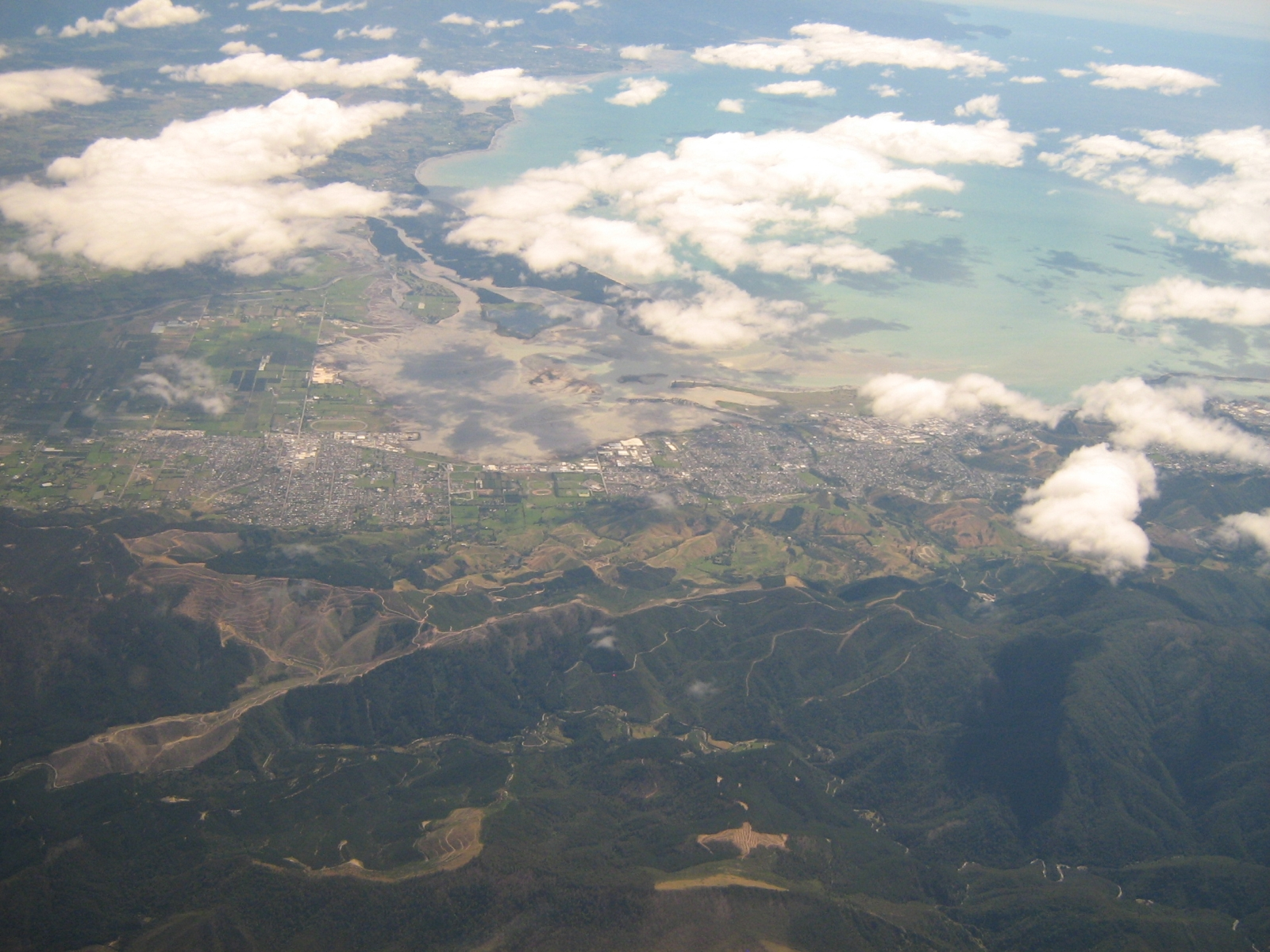
- Stoke is slightly right of centre, lying between Richmond on the left and Tāhunanui under the coastal cloud on the right
- Interactive map of Stoke
- Coordinates: 41.318°S 173.227°E
- Country: New Zealand
- Region: Nelson
- Ward: Stoke-Tāhunanui General Ward; Whakatū Māori Ward
- Electorates: Nelson; Te Tai Tonga (Māori)

Government
  - Territorial Authority: Nelson City Council
  - Nelson City Mayor: Nick Smith
  - Nelson MP: Rachel Boyack
  - Te Tai Tonga MP: Tākuta Ferris

Area
  - Total: 22.60 km^{2} (8.73 sq mi)

Population (June 2025)
  - Total: 20,260
  - Density: 896.5/km^{2} (2,322/sq mi)
- Time zone: UTC+12 (NZST)
  - Summer (DST): UTC+13 (NZDT)
- Postcode: 7011
- Area code: 03

Stoke (Māori: Omaio) is a suburb of Nelson in New Zealand, located between Richmond and Tāhunanui. Stoke was named by William Songer, the personal servant of Arthur Wakefield, after his birthplace Stoke-by-Nayland in Suffolk.

In 2010 it was voted the "Keep New Zealand Beautiful People's Choice Best Place in New Zealand".

A group of streets in Stoke, between Main Road Stoke and Nayland Road, are named after famous literary figures: Baxter, Browning, Byron, Coleridge, Dickens, Keats, Kipling, Holcroft, Homer, Marlowe, Masefield, Rossetti, Sargeson, Shelley, Tennyson, and Wordsworth.

== Local government ==
Originally, the area fell under the control of the Nelson Provincial Council (1853–1876). With the abolition of provincial government, Stoke became a riding of Waimea County. In 1958, Stoke became part of Nelson City alongside the suburbs of Enner Glynn, Wakatu, Annesbrook, and Monaco.

== Facilities ==
Saxton Field is an outdoor sports ground with softball, cricket, football, and hockey fields, a court for netball and an archery programme.

Saxton Stadium is a home of indoor sports such as futsal, handball, table tennis and volleyball, and the home of the basketball team Nelson Giants.

Isel Park is an historic park and house, which form part of the legacy left by the Marsden family of Stoke. It includes the Isel Park research facility which is part of the Nelson Provincial Museum.

The Stoke Hand sculpture is located outside Stoke library.

== Demographics ==
Stoke covers 22.60 km^{2} (8.73 sq mi). It had an estimated population of 20,260 as of June 2025, with a population density of 896 people per km^{2}.

Historical population
Year	Pop.	±% p.a.
2006	15,183	—
2013	16,788	+1.45%
2018	18,672	+2.15%
2023	19,491	+0.86%
The 2006 population is for a smaller area of 22.25 km^{2}. Source:

Stoke had a population of 19,491 in the 2023 New Zealand census, an increase of 819 people (4.4%) since the 2018 census, and an increase of 2,703 people (16.1%) since the 2013 census. There were 9,381 males, 10,011 females, and 93 people of other genders in 7,620 dwellings. 3.0% of people identified as LGBTIQ+. There were 3,285 people (16.9%) aged under 15 years, 3,084 (15.8%) aged 15 to 29, 8,661 (44.4%) aged 30 to 64, and 4,464 (22.9%) aged 65 or older.

People could identify as more than one ethnicity. The results were 86.2% European (Pākehā); 12.3% Māori; 2.8% Pasifika; 7.2% Asian; 1.1% Middle Eastern, Latin American and African New Zealanders (MELAA); and 2.7% other, which includes people giving their ethnicity as "New Zealander". English was spoken by 97.4%, Māori by 2.7%, Samoan by 0.5%, and other languages by 9.8%. No language could be spoken by 1.6% (e.g. too young to talk). New Zealand Sign Language was known by 0.6%. The percentage of people born overseas was 21.3, compared with 28.8% nationally.

Religious affiliations were 30.9% Christian, 1.0% Hindu, 0.3% Islam, 0.3% Māori religious beliefs, 1.0% Buddhist, 0.5% New Age, 0.1% Jewish, and 1.4% other religions. People who answered that they had no religion were 57.3%, and 7.3% of people did not answer the census question.

Of those at least 15 years old, 3,306 (20.4%) people had a bachelor's or higher degree, 8,781 (54.2%) had a post-high school certificate or diploma, and 4,116 (25.4%) people exclusively held high school qualifications. 1,218 people (7.5%) earned over $100,000 compared to 12.1% nationally. The employment status of those at least 15 was 7,857 (48.5%) full-time, 2,331 (14.4%) part-time, and 306 (1.9%) unemployed.

Individual statistical areas
Name	Area (km^{2})	Population	Density (per km^{2})	Dwellings	Median age	Median income
Broadgreen-Monaco	1.14	2,463	2,161	966	40.9 years	$39,400
Nayland	0.84	2,097	2,496	780	37.7 years	$41,200
Aldinga	1.11	3,174	2,859	1,278	50.7 years	$34,100
Maitlands	0.76	2,157	2,838	849	41.0 years	$41,800
Saxton	3.99	66	17	30	42.2 years	$41,800
Suffolk	2.00	2,658	1,329	1,044	54.2 years	$32,200
Omaio	5.36	3,912	730	1,530	43.0 years	$39,100
Enner Glynn	7.40	2,964	401	1,143	42.1 years	$45,400
New Zealand					38.1 years	$41,500

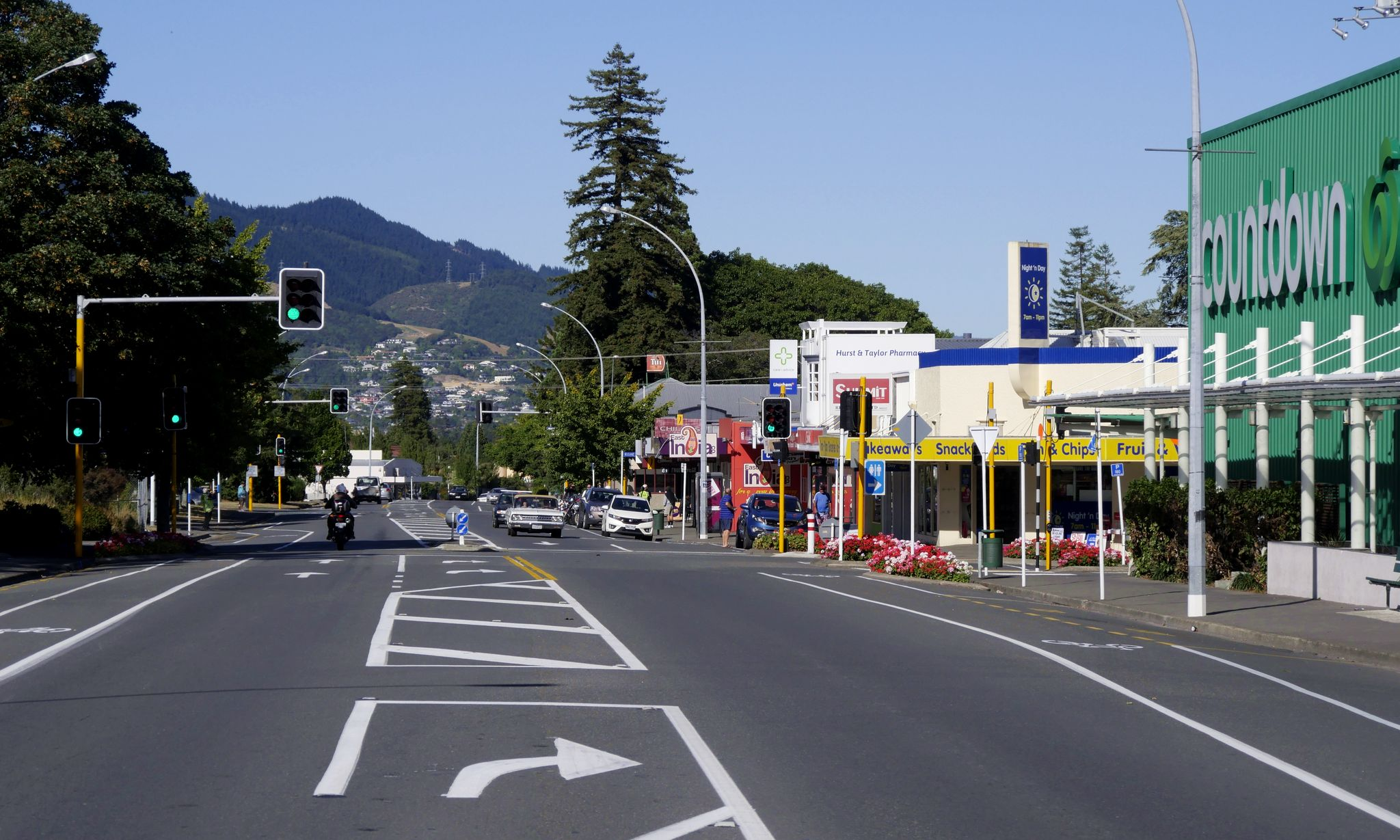
Stoke Main Road

== Education ==
Stoke School is a co-educational state primary school for Year 1 to 6 students/ It has a roll of 185 as of July 2026. It opened in 1845, moved to a new site in 1851, and moved again to its current location in 1858, with St Barnabas Church taking over the 1851 site.

Nelson Christian Academy is a co-educational private Christian primary school for Year 1 to 8 students. It has a roll of 315. It opened in 1977.

Local high schools include Nayland College, a state school in Nayland, and Garin College, a Catholic school in Richmond.
