= Garin College =

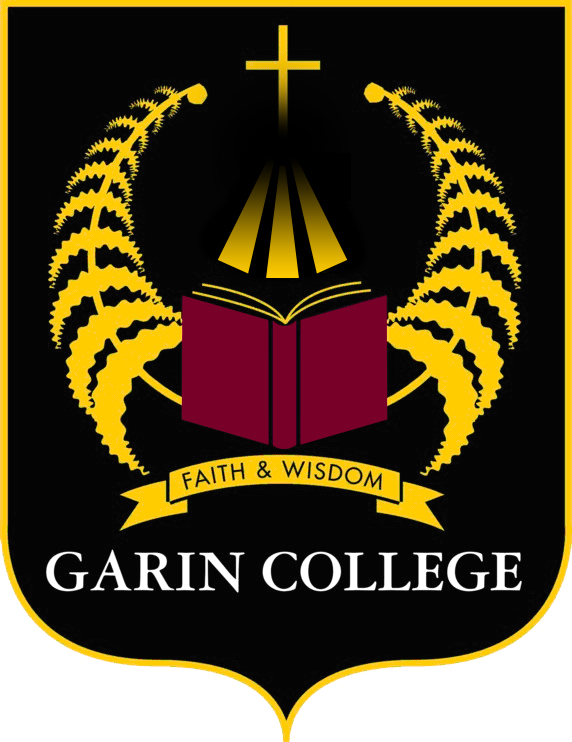

Location
- 35 Champion Rd, Saxton, Nelson, New Zealand; 41°20′09″S 173°12′19″E

Information
- Type: Integrated secondary (year 9–13) co-ed
- Motto: Small School, Big Heart
- Established: 2002; 24 years ago
- Ministry of Education Institution no.: 6975
- Principal: John Maguire
- Enrolment: 634 (July 2026)
- Socio-economic decile: 8
- Website: www.garincollege.ac.nz

Garin College is a New Zealand Catholic, integrated, co-educational day and boarding secondary school in Nelson on the northern outskirts of Richmond. The college opened on 28 January 2002 to serve the Catholic community, particularly in the upper South Island.

The college is named after Father Antoine Marie Garin (1810–1889) who was the founding pastor of the Catholic Church in Nelson. The proprietor of the school is the Catholic Archbishop of Wellington.

== Enrolment ==
As a state-integrated school, the proprietors of Garin College charge compulsory attendance dues to cover capital costs. For the 2025 school year, the attendance dues payable is $1,147 per year per student.

As of July 2026, Garin College has a roll of 634 students, of which 79 (12.5%) identify as Māori.

As of 2026, the school has an Equity Index of 429, placing it amongst schools whose students have few socioeconomic barriers to achievement (roughly equivalent to deciles 8 and 9 under the former socio-economic decile system).

== Houses ==
Garin College has four houses. The houses all have individual names (all are named catholic religious figures) and are represented by colours. Siblings enrolled at the college are often put in the same house.

- Aubert, Blue House
- Barbier, Green house
- MacKillop, Yellow house
- McAuley, Red house

== Boarding hostels ==
The school has accommodation for up to 56 boarders from outlying areas in its boarding hostel, separated into two houses by gender: Francis Douglas House for male students; and Mother Teresa House for female students.

== Haka ==
The college's haka was written and performed for the first time in 2006, four years after the school first opened. It was first unveiled to the school and spectators at the 2006 annual Te Wairua o nga Mahi Toi festival. It was the opening act on the 2006 final Mahi Toi night.

== Garin values ==
The name of the school has been backronymised to stand for: generosity, aroha (Māori for love), rangimarie (Māori for respect), integrity & new life

== Principals ==
Since its foundation in 2002, Garin College has had two principals.

	Name	Term
1	John Boyce	2002–2015
2	John Maguire	2016–present

== Notable alumni & students ==
- Caleb Nott, member of music duo Broods
- Georgia Nott, lead vocals of music duo Broods
- Anna Robinson, singer
- Nate Wilbourne, environmentalist
