= Nelson Central School =

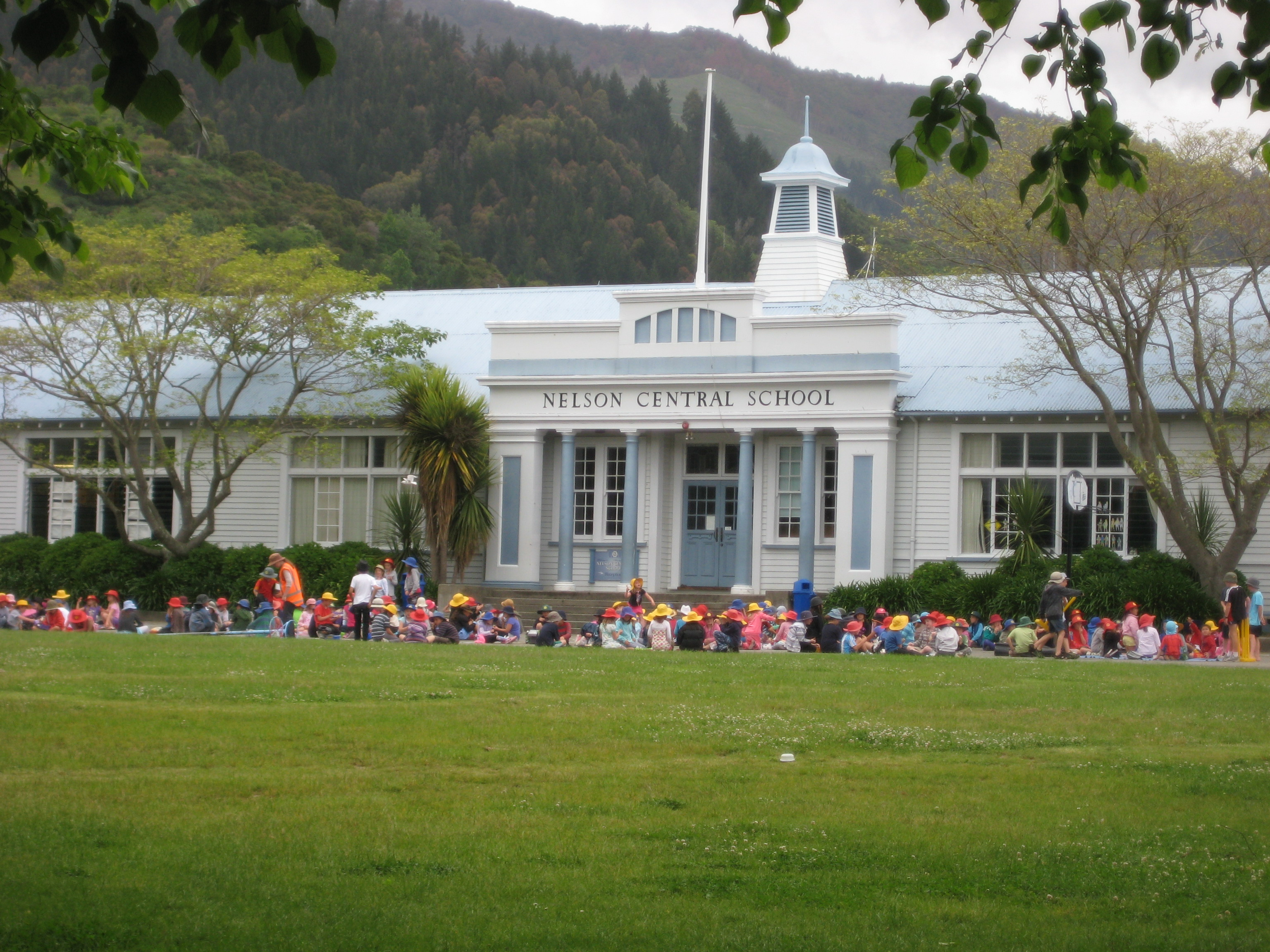
- Nelson Central School in 2011

Location
- 70 Nile Street, Nelson; 41.2774°S 173.2885°E

Information
- Type: Contributing Primary
- Motto: Māori: Ki Runga Rawa
- Established: 1878; 148 years ago
- Ministry of Education Institution no.: 3209
- Principal: Pip Wells
- Enrolment: 377 (July 2026)
- Socio-economic decile: 7
- Website: nelsoncentral.school.nz

Nelson Central School is a state primary contributing school located in the inner city of Nelson at the top of the South Island of New Zealand teaching children of both genders aged 5 to 11 years.

== Location ==
Nelson Central School is situated in the city of Nelson, New Zealand, on Nile Street, three blocks east of Christ Church Cathedral, Nelson.

== Enrolment ==
As a primary contributing school, Nelson Central School sends pupils to Nelson Intermediate School, Nelson College for Girls Preparatory School and Nelson College Preparatory School. Nelson Central School enrols children between 5 and 11 years of age. Typically, about 50–60 five-year-old children start each year.

== History ==
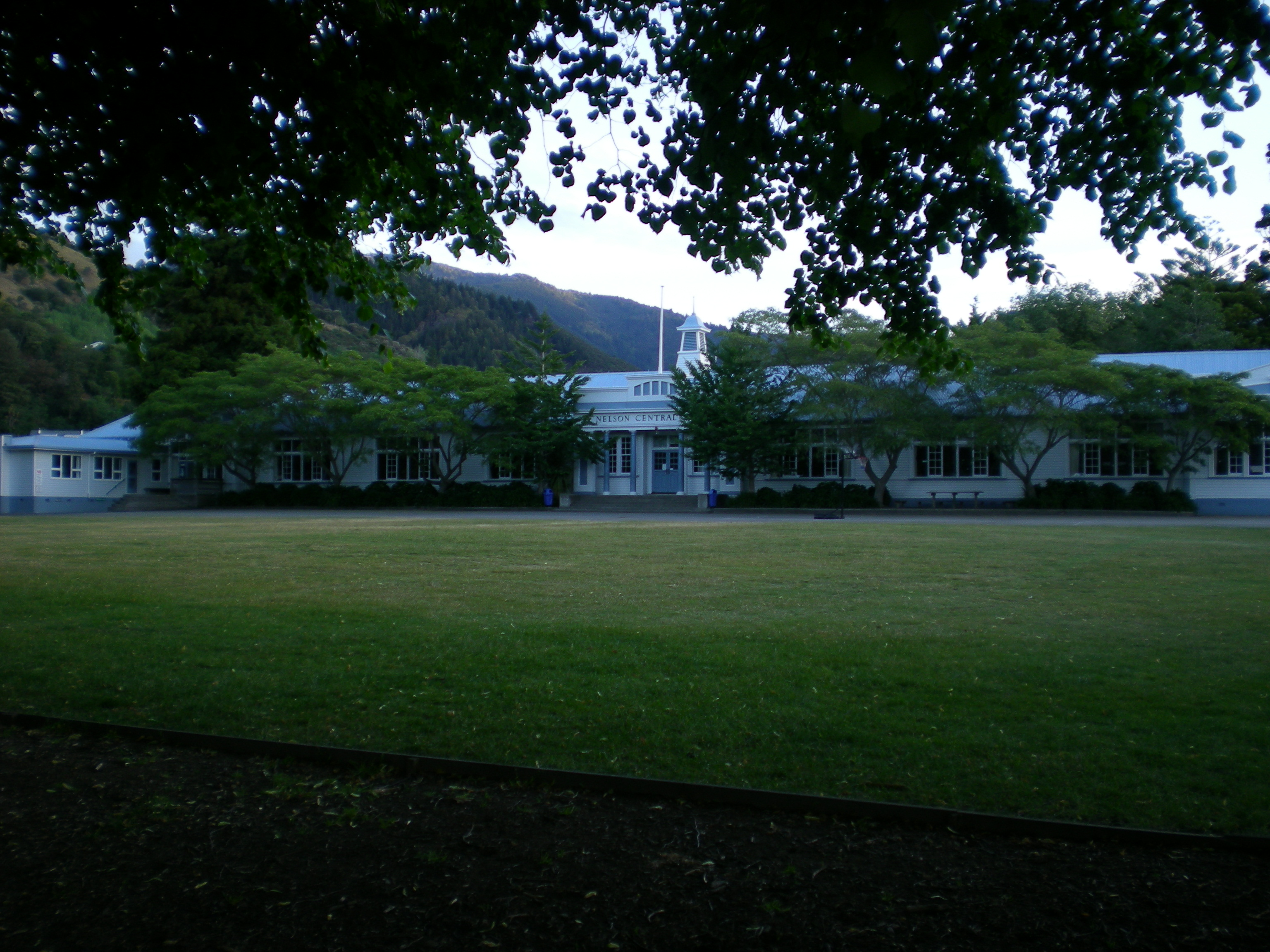
Nelson Central School from Nile St.

Nelson Central School is now the oldest school in New Zealand still functioning on its original unitary site. Consequently, its main building and Renwick House (named after Dr Thomas Renwick) are of architectural interest. The site of the present school was purchased by the Nelson Education Board in 1893 for £1600. The official opening ceremony of the main school building was held on Monday 23 June 1930. The school building is registered by Heritage New Zealand as a Category II historic structure. The building was added to the register on 25 November 1982, with register number 1596.

(The first school in the new Pākehā settlement of Nelson had opened in March 1842, "in a house built of toi toi", just a few months after the New Zealand Company's first settlers landed.)

== Māori ==
The number of Māori children enrolled at the school is proportionately greater than would be expected given the total Māori population in the City of Nelson. This may be due to the presence of four Māori language immersion classes with a full-time Kaiarahi reo within Nelson Central.

All students take part in the school's Mana Maori programme as required under the Treaty of Waitangi and all students have the opportunity to acquire some knowledge of Maori language and culture.
