= List of parks in Nelson, New Zealand =

This is a list of parks in Nelson City at the top of New Zealand's South Island.

| Name | Coordinates | Location | Territorial authority area | Type |
|---|---|---|---|---|
| Abraham Heights Reserve | 41.2767273°S 173.2640375°E | Washington Valley | Nelson | Local park |
| Airport Peninsula Esplanade | 41.296485°S 173.230496°E | Tāhunanui | Nelson | Local park |
| Andrews Farm Reserve | 41.2934029°S 173.295637°E | The Brook | Nelson | Local park |
| Annesbrook Youth Park | 41.304193°S 173.241909°E | Tāhunanui | Nelson | Local park |
| Anzac Memorial Park | 41.2711546°S 173.2780127°E | Nelson Central | Nelson | Local park |
| Bayview Reserve | 41.2501228°S 173.3120812°E | Atawhai | Nelson | Local park |
| Betsy Eyre Park | 41.2909014°S 173.290101°E | The Brook | Nelson | Local park |
| Bishopdale Reserve | 41.2979699°S 173.2650049°E | Bishopdale | Nelson | Local park |
| Bishopdale Retention Dam Bank | 41.302910°S 173.268327°E | Bishopdale | Nelson | Local park |
| Bisley Reserve | 41.280739°S 173.253252°E | Moana | Nelson | Local park |
| Botanical Reserve / Botanical Hill | 41.2666648°S 173.2824904°E | The Wood | Nelson | Local park |
| Blackwood Reserve | 41.2951996°S 173.2438858°E | Wakatu | Nelson | Local park |
| Bolt Reserve | 41.294069°S 173.233918°E | Tāhunanui | Nelson | Local park |
| Botanical Gardens Cricket Ground | 41.274016°S 173.2936138°E | Maitai | Nelson | Sports ground |
| Boulder Bank | 41.2282396°S 173.3183677°E | Marybank | Nelson | DOC reserve |
| Branford Park | 41.2722542°S 173.3013463°E | Maitai | Nelson | Local park |
| Brook Park | 41.3116212°S 173.2922419°E | The Brook | Nelson | Local park |
| Bruno Reserve | 41.280739°S 173.253252°E | Moana | Nelson | Local park |
| Burrell Park | 41.2863597°S 173.2429754°E | Tāhunanui | Nelson | Local park |
| Cable Bay Walkway | 41°9′20″S 173°24′39″E | Cable Bay to Glenduan | Nelson | DOC reserve |
| Cattle Market Reserve | 41.2939879°S 173.2665587°E | Bishopdale | Nelson | Local park |
| Centennial Park | 41.2851399°S 173.2413337°E | Tāhunanui | Nelson | Local park |
| Church Hill | 41.2763207°S 173.2659145°E | Nelson Central | Nelson | Local park |
| Corder Park | 41.2356678°S 173.3160478°E | Atawhai | Nelson | Local park |
| Custom House Reserve | 41.2629584°S 173.2682585°E | Port Nelson | Nelson | Local park |
| Douglas Reserve | 41.296323°S 173.246344°E | Wakatu | Nelson | Local park |
| Emano East Reserve | 41.2848333°S 173.2605628°E | Toi Toi | Nelson | Local park |
| Enner Glynn North Reserve | 41.3020945°S 173.2522834°E | Enner Glynn | Nelson | Local park |
| Erin Reserve | 41.2787104°S 173.2894286°E | Nelson Central | Nelson | Local park |
| Fairfield Park | 41.2825034°S 173.2803°E | Nelson South | Nelson | Local park |
| Fountain Place Gardens | 41.2672358°S 173.2727506°E | Beachville | Nelson | Public garden |
| Fountain Reserve | 41.267222°S 173.2751021°E | Beachville | Nelson | Local park |
| Frenchay Reserve | 41.2439737°S 173.3225012°E | Atawhai | Nelson | Local park |
| Glenduan Reserve | 41.1868076°S 173.3618198°E | Glenduan | Nelson | Beach, local park |
| Grampians Reserve | 41.2969743°S 173.2773053°E | The Brook | Nelson | Local park |
| Grove Reserve | 41.3027262°S 173.2928584°E | The Brook | Nelson | Local park |
| Guppy Park | 41.2651091°S 173.2864949°E | The Wood | Nelson | Local park |
| Hallowell Cemetery | 41.2779778°S 173.2836021°E | Nelson Central | Nelson | Cemetery |
| Hanby Park | 41.2746077°S 173.3025308°E | Maitai | Nelson | Local park |
| Haulashore Island | 41.2721983°S 173.269757°E | Stepneyville | Nelson | Local park |
| Highview Reserve | 41.299069°S 173.251106°E | Wakatu | Nelson | Local park |
| Horoirangi Marine Reserve | 41.1623°S 173.3768°E | Glenduan | Nelson | Marine reserve |
| Jenkins Creek Esplanade | 41.303865°S 173.254189°E | Enner Glynn | Nelson | Local park |
| Maitai Arboretum | 41.2721983°S 173.269757°E | Maitai | Nelson | Local park |
| Maitai Cricket Ground | 41.2721983°S 173.269757°E | Maitai | Nelson | Sports ground |
| Maitai River Esplanade | 41.2721983°S 173.269757°E | Maitai | Nelson | Local park |
| Marybank Reserve | 41.2282396°S 173.3183677°E | Marybank | Nelson | Local park |
| Miyazu Japanese Garden | 41.2558391°S 173.2977755°E | Atawhai | Nelson | Public garden |
| Montrose Reserve | 41.2531462°S 173.3092096°E | Atawhai | Nelson | Local park |
| Melrose Gardens | 41.281736°S 173.2823323°E | Nelson South | Nelson | Public garden |
| Moncrieff Reserve | 41.2750239°S 173.2590572°E | Britannia Heights | Nelson | Local park |
| Murphy North Reserve | 41.2857644°S 173.2611334°E | Toi Toi | Nelson | Local park |
| Neale Park | 41.2645245°S 173.2894498°E | The Wood | Nelson | Local park |
| Nelson Marina | 41.2625163°S 173.2661329°E | Port Nelson | Nelson | Marina |
| Ngapua Reserve | 41.2428823°S 173.3184616°E | Atawhai | Nelson | Local park |
| Norgate Reserve | 41.298044°S 173.246067°E | Wakatu | Nelson | Local park |
| Oyster Island | 41.3011258°S 173.1973481°E | Tāhunanui | Nelson | Local park |
| Old Bank Lane Gardens | 41.2735701°S 173.2855102°E | Nelson Central | Nelson | Public garden |
| Paddys Knob Reserve | 41.282024°S 173.250252°E | Tāhunanui | Nelson | Local park |
| Paru Paru Reserve | 41.267475°S 173.279627°E | Nelson Central | Nelson | Local park |
| Peace Grove | 41.2638504°S 173.2872678°E | The Wood | Nelson | Local park |
| Pepper Tree Park | 41.2674211°S 173.2897642°E | The Wood | Nelson | Local park |
| Pioneers Park | 41.2721342°S 173.2739019°E | Stepneyville | Nelson | Local park |
| Pipers Park Reserve | 41.2828689°S 173.253985°E | Britannia Heights | Nelson | Local park |
| Princes Lookout Reserve | 41.2721342°S 173.2739019°E | Nelson Central | Nelson | Local park |
| Quakers Acre Cemetery | 41.2756087°S 173.2800037°E | Nelson Central | Nelson | Cemetery |
| Queen Elizabeth II Reserve | 41.2595999°S 173.2950411°E | Atawhai | Nelson | Public gardens, local park |
| Queens Gardens | 41.2734805°S 173.288407°E | Nelson Central | Nelson | Public garden |
| Riverside Pool Complex | 41.2719235°S 173.2878053°E | Nelson Central | Nelson | Public pools |
| Riverside Reserve | 41.271443°S 173.289348°E | Nelson Central | Nelson | Local park |
| Ronaki Reserve | 41.285924°S 173.281092°E | Nelson South | Nelson | Local park |
| Russell Reserve | 41.2673655°S 173.2687118°E | Stepneyville | Nelson | Local park |
| Rutherford Park | 41.2682426°S 173.279195°E | Nelson Central | Nelson | Local park |
| Sequoia Reserve | 41.2734889°S 173.2634891°E | Washington Valley | Nelson | Local park |
| Sharland Hill Reserve | 41.275844°S 173.328784°E | Maitai | Nelson | Local park |
| Sir Stanley Whitehead Park | 41.2729258°S 173.2970161°E | Maitai | Nelson | Local park |
| St Lawrence Reserve | 41.276236°S 173.273471°E | Toi Toi | Nelson | Local park |
| Station Reserve | 41.2977922°S 173.26108°E | Bishopdale | Nelson | Local park |
| Tāhunanui Beach | 41.2791672°S 173.2260645°E | Tāhunanui | Nelson | Local park |
| Tāhunanui Recreation Reserve | 41.2809304°S 173.2448776°E | Tāhunanui | Nelson | Local park |
| Tantragee Reserve | 41.293417°S 173.298817°E | The Brook | Nelson | Local park |
| Tasman Heights Reserve | 36.8214565°S 174.6685772°E | Tāhunanui | Nelson | Local park |
| Te-Ata Reserve | 41.2411133°S 173.3188794°E | Atawhai | Nelson | Local park |
| Titoki Reserve | 41.236997°S 173.3242463°E | Atawhai | Nelson | Local park |
| Tosswill Reserve | 41.2892249°S 173.2452338°E | Tāhunanui | Nelson | Local park |
| Trafalgar Park | 41.2662743°S 173.2802172°E | The Wood | Nelson | Local park |
| Tresillian Reserve | 41.2265749°S 173.3230398°E | Atawhai | Nelson | Local park |
| Victory Square | 41.2806956°S 173.2690915°E | Toi Toi | Nelson | Local park |
| Vosper Reserve | 41.279678°S 173.267440°E | Toi Toi | Nelson | Local park |
| Waimea North Reserve | 41.2821632°S 173.2757184°E | Nelson South | Nelson | Local park |
| Waimea South Reserve | 41.298157°N 173.263208°E | Bishopdale | Nelson | Local park |
| Wakapuaka Cemetery | 41.2552594°S 173.300678°E | Atawhai | Nelson | Cemetery |
| Wakapuaka Sandflats Esplanade | 41.2069019°S 173.3338253°E | Wakapuaka | Nelson | Local park |
| Wakefield Quay Gardens | 41.2823087°S 173.2902412°E | Stepneyville | Nelson | Public garden |
| Wards Reserve | 41.2823087°S 173.2902412°E | The Brook | Nelson | Local park |
| Wellington Reserve | 41.2772863°S 173.2791239°E | Nelson South | Nelson | Local park |
| Werneth Reserve | 41.2379896°S 173.3209562°E | Atawhai | Nelson | Local park |
| Wigzell Park | 41.2833911°S 173.2719623°E | Nelson South | Nelson | Local park |
| Wolfe Reserve | 41.2744604°S 173.2652819°E | Washington Valley | Nelson | Local park |

== See also ==
- List of marae in Nelson, New Zealand
- List of schools in Nelson, New Zealand
