= Tasman Heights =

Suburb of Nelson, New Zealand

- Suburb
- Interactive map of Tasman Heights
- Coordinates: 41°17′30″S 173°15′10″E
- Country: New Zealand
- Region: Nelson
- Ward: Stoke-Tāhunanui General Ward; Whakatū Māori Ward
- Electorates: Nelson; Te Tai Tonga (Māori)

Government
  - Territorial Authority: Nelson City Council
  - Nelson City Mayor: Nick Smith
  - Nelson MP: Rachel Boyack
  - Te Tai Tonga MP: Tākuta Ferris

Area
  - Total: 0.11 km^{2} (0.042 sq mi)

Population (2023 census)
  - Total: 150
  - Density: 1,400/km^{2} (3,500/sq mi)
- Time zone: UTC+12 (NZST)
  - Summer (DST): UTC+13 (NZDT)
- Postcode: 7010
- Area code: 03

Tasman Heights is one of the suburbs of Nelson, New Zealand. It lies to the southeast of Nelson city centre, between Wakatu and Moana.

== Demographics ==
Tasman Heights covers 0.11 km^{2} (0.042 sq mi). It is part of both the Britannia Heights#Demographics and Tahuna Hills areas.

Historical population
Year	Pop.	±% p.a.
2006	105	—
2013	126	+2.64%
2018	150	+3.55%
2023	150	+0.00%

Tasman Heights had a population of 150 in the 2023 New Zealand census, unchanged since the 2018 census, and an increase of 24 people (19.0%) since the 2013 census. There were 72 males and 81 females in 66 dwellings. 2.0% of people identified as LGBTIQ+. The median age was 59.7 years (compared with 38.1 years nationally). There were 15 people (10.0%) aged under 15 years, 9 (6.0%) aged 15 to 29, 63 (42.0%) aged 30 to 64, and 60 (40.0%) aged 65 or older.

People could identify as more than one ethnicity. The results were 92.0% European (Pākehā), 10.0% Māori, and 4.0% Asian. English was spoken by 98.0%, Māori by 4.0%, and other languages by 14.0%. No language could be spoken by 2.0% (e.g. too young to talk). New Zealand Sign Language was known by 2.0%. The percentage of people born overseas was 24.0, compared with 28.8% nationally.

Religious affiliations were 34.0% Christian, and 2.0% New Age. People who answered that they had no religion were 62.0%, and 4.0% of people did not answer the census question.

Of those at least 15 years old, 42 (31.1%) people had a bachelor's or higher degree, 84 (62.2%) had a post-high school certificate or diploma, and 15 (11.1%) people exclusively held high school qualifications. The median income was $47,600, compared with $41,500 nationally. 24 people (17.8%) earned over $100,000 compared to 12.1% nationally. The employment status of those at least 15 was 45 (33.3%) full-time, 27 (20.0%) part-time, and 3 (2.2%) unemployed.
