= Toi Toi =

Suburb in Nelson, New Zealand

- Suburb
- Interactive map of Toi Toi
- Coordinates: 41°17′10″S 173°15′45″E
- Country: New Zealand
- Region: Nelson
- Ward: Central General Ward; Whakatū Māori Ward
- Electorates: Nelson; Te Tai Tonga (Māori)

Government
  - Territorial Authority: Nelson City Council
  - Nelson City Mayor: Nick Smith
  - Nelson MP: Rachel Boyack
  - Te Tai Tonga MP: Tākuta Ferris

Area
  - Total: 1.94 km^{2} (0.75 sq mi)

Population (June 2025)
  - Total: 3,350
  - Density: 1,730/km^{2} (4,470/sq mi)
- Time zone: UTC+12 (NZST)
  - Summer (DST): UTC+13 (NZDT)
- Postcode: 7010
- Area code: 03

Toi Toi is an inner suburb of Nelson, New Zealand. It lies to the southwest of Nelson city centre, inland from Britannia Heights and Washington Valley. Toi Toi is also known as Victory Village.

The population was 3,270 in the 2018 census.

Toi Toi features Victory Square and four other public parks: Emano East Reserve, Murphy North Reserve, St Lawrence Reserve and Vosper Reserve.

== Demographics ==
Toi Toi, comprising the statistical areas of Toi Toi and Victory, covers 1.94 km^{2} (0.75 sq mi). It had an estimated population of 3,350 as of June 2025, with a population density of 1,727 people per km^{2}.

Historical population
Year	Pop.	±% p.a.
2006	3,108	—
2013	3,060	−0.22%
2018	3,270	+1.34%
2023	3,207	−0.39%

Toi Toi had a population of 3,207 in the 2023 New Zealand census, a decrease of 63 people (−1.9%) since the 2018 census, and an increase of 147 people (4.8%) since the 2013 census. There were 1,587 males, 1,590 females, and 24 people of other genders in 1,185 dwellings. 4.8% of people identified as LGBTIQ+. There were 678 people (21.1%) aged under 15 years, 594 (18.5%) aged 15 to 29, 1,581 (49.3%) aged 30 to 64, and 354 (11.0%) aged 65 or older.

People could identify as more than one ethnicity. The results were 71.2% European (Pākehā); 15.2% Māori; 3.7% Pasifika; 20.8% Asian; 1.5% Middle Eastern, Latin American and African New Zealanders (MELAA); and 2.5% other, which includes people giving their ethnicity as "New Zealander". English was spoken by 92.9%, Māori by 3.6%, Samoan by 0.7%, and other languages by 21.5%. No language could be spoken by 2.2% (e.g. too young to talk). New Zealand Sign Language was known by 0.7%. The percentage of people born overseas was 29.8, compared with 28.8% nationally.

Religious affiliations were 29.5% Christian, 1.3% Hindu, 0.4% Islam, 0.4% Māori religious beliefs, 1.6% Buddhist, 1.4% New Age, 0.2% Jewish, and 1.8% other religions. People who answered that they had no religion were 55.8%, and 7.9% of people did not answer the census question.

Of those at least 15 years old, 531 (21.0%) people had a bachelor's or higher degree, 1,221 (48.3%) had a post-high school certificate or diploma, and 771 (30.5%) people exclusively held high school qualifications. 114 people (4.5%) earned over $100,000 compared to 12.1% nationally. The employment status of those at least 15 was 1,275 (50.4%) full-time, 390 (15.4%) part-time, and 78 (3.1%) unemployed.

Individual statistical areas
Name	Area (km^{2})	Population	Density (per km^{2})	Dwellings	Median age	Median income
Toi Toi	1.31	1,686	1,287	612	36.2 years	$38,300
Victory	0.63	1,521	2,414	573	36.3 years	$35,900
New Zealand					38.1 years	$41,500
