= Stepneyville =

Suburb of Nelson, New Zealand

- Suburb
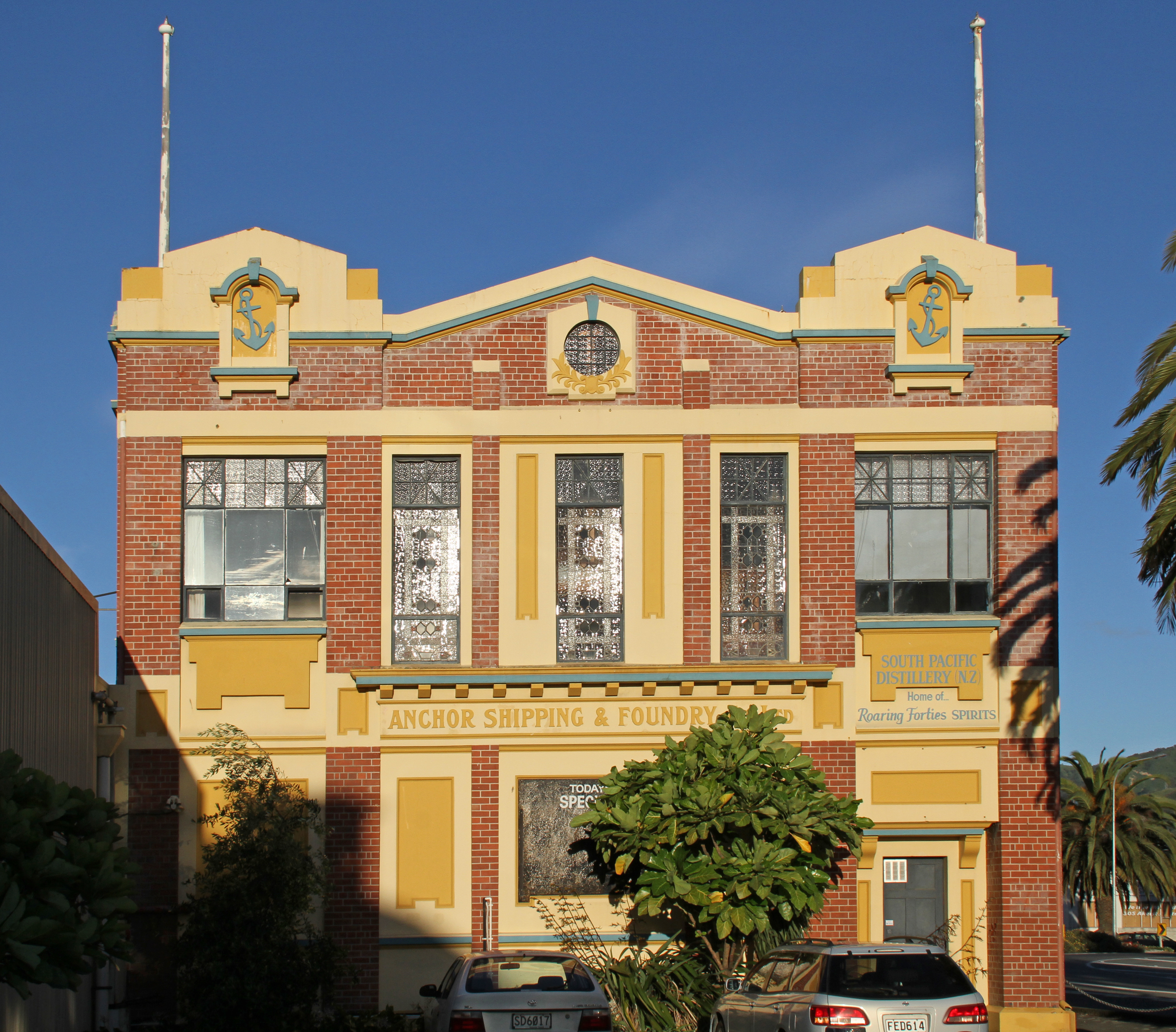
- Anchor Shipping and Foundry
- Interactive map of Stepneyville
- Coordinates: 41°16′00″S 173°16′10″E
- Country: New Zealand
- Region: Nelson
- Ward: Central General Ward; Whakatū Māori Ward
- Electorates: Nelson; Te Tai Tonga (Māori)

Government
  - Territorial Authority: Nelson City Council
  - Nelson City Mayor: Nick Smith
  - Nelson MP: Rachel Boyack
  - Te Tai Tonga MP: Tākuta Ferris

Area
  - Total: 0.84 km^{2} (0.32 sq mi)
  - Land: 0.84 km^{2} (0.32 sq mi)
  - Water: 0 km^{2} (0 sq mi)

Population (June 2025)
  - Total: 1,750
  - Density: 2,100/km^{2} (5,400/sq mi)
- Time zone: UTC+12 (NZST)
  - Summer (DST): UTC+13 (NZDT)
- Postcode: 7010
- Area code: 03

Stepneyville is a suburb of Nelson, New Zealand.

It lies on State Highway 6 to the west of Nelson city centre, on the shore of Tasman Bay / Te Tai-o-Aorere, between Port Nelson and Britannia Heights.

== Geography ==
The corresponding Statistics New Zealand statistical area is Britannia, which also includes Beachville and covers a land area of 0.84 km^{2}.

Haulashore Island is located offshore from Stepneyville.

Other public reserves in Stepneyville include Pioneers Park, Russell Reserve and Wakefield Quay Gardens.

== History ==
The estimated population of Britannia reached 1,770 in 1996. The boundaries prior to 2006 may not have been the same.

It was 1,830 in 2001, 1,566 in 2006, 1,650 in 2013, and 1,767 in 2018.

== Demography ==
Britannia had an estimated population of 1,750 as of June 2025, with a population density of 2,083 people per km^{2}.

Historical population
Year	Pop.	±% p.a.
2006	1,566	—
2013	1,650	+0.75%
2018	1,767	+1.38%
2023	1,722	−0.51%

Britannia had a population of 1,722 in the 2023 New Zealand census, a decrease of 45 people (−2.5%) since the 2018 census, and an increase of 72 people (4.4%) since the 2013 census. There were 840 males, 870 females, and 12 people of other genders in 744 dwellings. 4.4% of people identified as LGBTIQ+. The median age was 46.0 years (compared with 38.1 years nationally). There were 279 people (16.2%) aged under 15 years, 255 (14.8%) aged 15 to 29, 789 (45.8%) aged 30 to 64, and 399 (23.2%) aged 65 or older.

People could identify as more than one ethnicity. The results were 84.5% European (Pākehā); 10.5% Māori; 3.5% Pasifika; 9.2% Asian; 1.2% Middle Eastern, Latin American and African New Zealanders (MELAA); and 2.4% other, which includes people giving their ethnicity as "New Zealander". English was spoken by 96.2%, Māori by 3.0%, Samoan by 2.1%, and other languages by 16.9%. No language could be spoken by 1.6% (e.g. too young to talk). New Zealand Sign Language was known by 0.2%. The percentage of people born overseas was 31.4, compared with 28.8% nationally.

Religious affiliations were 26.1% Christian, 1.2% Hindu, 0.3% Islam, 0.2% Māori religious beliefs, 1.6% Buddhist, 0.9% New Age, and 1.6% other religions. People who answered that they had no religion were 61.1%, and 7.1% of people did not answer the census question.

Of those at least 15 years old, 543 (37.6%) people had a bachelor's or higher degree, 612 (42.4%) had a post-high school certificate or diploma, and 288 (20.0%) people exclusively held high school qualifications. The median income was $44,800, compared with $41,500 nationally. 192 people (13.3%) earned over $100,000 compared to 12.1% nationally. The employment status of those at least 15 was 678 (47.0%) full-time, 246 (17.0%) part-time, and 30 (2.1%) unemployed.

== Economy ==
In 2018, 8.3% of the workforce worked in manufacturing, 6.7% worked in construction, 0.0% worked in retail and wholesale, 8.9% worked in hospitality, 5.7% worked in transport, 7.3% worked in education, and 10.8% worked in healthcare.

== Transport ==
As of 2018, among those who commute to work, 78.6% drove a car, 2.8% rode in a car, 1.5% use a bike, and 1.5% walk or run.

No one used public transport.
