= Bishopdale, Nelson =

Bishopdale
- Suburb
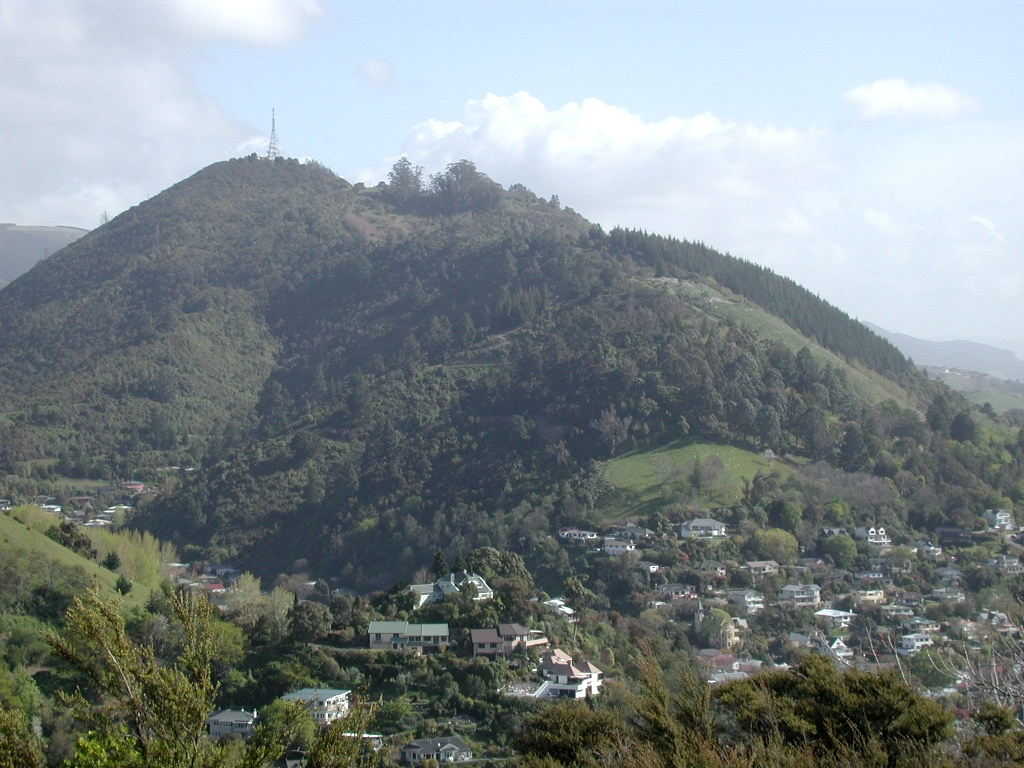
- Interactive map of Bishopdale
- Coordinates: 41°17′50″S 173°16′0″E
- Country: New Zealand
- Region: Nelson
- Territorial authority: Nelson

Government
  - Nelson City Mayor: Nick Smith
  - Nelson MP: Rachel Boyack
  - Te Tai Tonga MP: Tākuta Ferris

Area
  - Total: 0.54 km^{2} (0.21 sq mi)
  - Land: 0.54 km^{2} (0.21 sq mi)
  - Water: 0 km^{2} (0 sq mi)

Population (2023 census)
  - Total: 624
  - Density: 1,200/km^{2} (3,000/sq mi)
- Time zone: UTC+12 (NZST)
  - Summer (DST): UTC+13 (NZDT)
- Postcode: 7010
- Area code: 03

Bishopdale is one of the suburbs of Nelson, New Zealand.

It lies to the south of Nelson city centre, inland from Wakatu, at the foot of the Grampians Reserve.

== History ==
in 1858 Edmund Hobhouse was consecrated as the first bishop of the newly-formed Anglican Diocese of Nelson. In 1862 he purchased a four-acre plot of land in the south of Neslon to establish a Bishop's Residence, to be known as Bishopdale. Bishop Hobhouse returned to England in 1866, but gifted the Bishopdale Estate to the diocese.

The original estate is now preserved as the Bishopdale Historic Area, with the Bishopdale suburb having grown around the estate.

== Geography ==
The suburb has several public reserves: Bishopdale Reserve, Bishopdale Retention Dam Bank, and Station Reserve..

== Demography ==
Bishopdale covers 0.54 km^{2} (0.21 sq mi). It is part of the larger Grampians statistical area.

Historical population
Year	Pop.	±% p.a.
2006	471	—
2013	492	+0.63%
2018	534	+1.65%
2023	624	+3.16%

Bishopdale had a population of 624 in the 2023 New Zealand census, an increase of 90 people (16.9%) since the 2018 census, and an increase of 132 people (26.8%) since the 2013 census. There were 288 males, 330 females, and 3 people of other genders in 240 dwellings. 3.8% of people identified as LGBTIQ+. There were 93 people (14.9%) aged under 15 years, 96 (15.4%) aged 15 to 29, 318 (51.0%) aged 30 to 64, and 114 (18.3%) aged 65 or older.

People could identify as more than one ethnicity. The results were 78.4% European (Pākehā); 12.5% Māori; 2.9% Pasifika; 10.6% Asian; 1.9% Middle Eastern, Latin American and African New Zealanders (MELAA); and 6.2% other, which includes people giving their ethnicity as "New Zealander". English was spoken by 95.2%, Māori by 3.4%, Samoan by 1.4%, and other languages by 16.8%. No language could be spoken by 2.4% (e.g. too young to talk). New Zealand Sign Language was known by 1.4%. The percentage of people born overseas was 32.2, compared with 28.8% nationally.

Religious affiliations were 34.1% Christian, 2.4% Hindu, 0.5% Islam, 0.5% Māori religious beliefs, 1.4% Buddhist, 0.5% New Age, 0.5% Jewish, and 1.4% other religions. People who answered that they had no religion were 47.6%, and 10.6% of people did not answer the census question.

Of those at least 15 years old, 159 (29.9%) people had a bachelor's or higher degree, 246 (46.3%) had a post-high school certificate or diploma, and 123 (23.2%) people exclusively held high school qualifications. 51 people (9.6%) earned over $100,000 compared to 12.1% nationally. The employment status of those at least 15 was 288 (54.2%) full-time, 63 (11.9%) part-time, and 12 (2.3%) unemployed.
