= Washington Valley, New Zealand =

Suburb of Nelson, New Zealand

Washington Valley
- Suburb
- Interactive map of Washington Valley
- Coordinates: 41°16′20″S 173°16′10″E
- Country: New Zealand
- Region: Nelson
- Ward: Central General Ward; Whakatū Māori Ward
- Electorates: Nelson; Te Tai Tonga (Māori)

Government
  - Territorial Authority: Nelson City Council
  - Nelson City Mayor: Nick Smith
  - Nelson MP: Rachel Boyack
  - Te Tai Tonga MP: Tākuta Ferris

Area
  - Total: 1.12 km^{2} (0.43 sq mi)
  - Land: 1.12 km^{2} (0.43 sq mi)
  - Water: 0 km^{2} (0 sq mi)

Population (June 2025)
  - Total: 2,970
  - Density: 2,650/km^{2} (6,870/sq mi)
- Time zone: UTC+12 (NZST)
  - Summer (DST): UTC+13 (NZDT)
- Postcode: 7010
- Area code: 03

Washington Valley is a major inner suburb of Nelson, New Zealand. It lies to the west of Nelson city centre and south of Stepneyville and Beachville.

The equivalent Statistics New Zealand statistical area of Washington covers a land area of 1.12 km^{2}.

The suburb has three local parks: Abraham Heights Reserve, Sequoia Reserve and Wolfe Reserve.

== History ==
The estimated population of Washington reached 2,510 in 1996, before dropping to 2,450 in 2001.

It reached 2,526 in 2006, 2,469 in 2013, and 2,847 in 2018.

== Demography ==
Washington statistical area covers 1.12 km^{2} (0.43 sq mi) and includes part of Britannia Heights. It had an estimated population of 2,970 as of June 2025, with a population density of 2,652 people per km^{2}.

Historical population
Year	Pop.	±% p.a.
2006	2,526	—
2013	2,469	−0.33%
2018	2,847	+2.89%
2023	2,826	−0.15%

Washington had a population of 2,826 in the 2023 New Zealand census, a decrease of 21 people (−0.7%) since the 2018 census, and an increase of 357 people (14.5%) since the 2013 census. There were 1,431 males, 1,386 females, and 12 people of other genders in 1,029 dwellings. 4.8% of people identified as LGBTIQ+. The median age was 35.2 years (compared with 38.1 years nationally). There were 549 people (19.4%) aged under 15 years, 603 (21.3%) aged 15 to 29, 1,335 (47.2%) aged 30 to 64, and 342 (12.1%) aged 65 or older.

People could identify as more than one ethnicity. The results were 73.4% European (Pākehā); 16.6% Māori; 3.8% Pasifika; 15.4% Asian; 1.8% Middle Eastern, Latin American and African New Zealanders (MELAA); and 3.8% other, which includes people giving their ethnicity as "New Zealander". English was spoken by 93.9%, Māori by 6.6%, Samoan by 0.8%, and other languages by 18.5%. No language could be spoken by 2.8% (e.g. too young to talk). New Zealand Sign Language was known by 0.4%. The percentage of people born overseas was 32.3, compared with 28.8% nationally.

Religious affiliations were 25.8% Christian, 2.0% Hindu, 0.7% Islam, 0.8% Māori religious beliefs, 1.9% Buddhist, 0.6% New Age, and 1.8% other religions. People who answered that they had no religion were 57.7%, and 9.0% of people did not answer the census question.

Of those at least 15 years old, 597 (26.2%) people had a bachelor's or higher degree, 1,119 (49.1%) had a post-high school certificate or diploma, and 558 (24.5%) people exclusively held high school qualifications. The median income was $39,800, compared with $41,500 nationally. 177 people (7.8%) earned over $100,000 compared to 12.1% nationally. The employment status of those at least 15 was 1,146 (50.3%) full-time, 375 (16.5%) part-time, and 66 (2.9%) unemployed.

== Economy ==
In 2018, 11.5% worked in manufacturing, 7.6% worked in construction, 11.0% worked in hospitality, 3.4% worked in transport, 6.2% worked in education, and 11.2% worked in healthcare.

== Transport ==
As of 2018, among those who commuted to work, 67.1% drove a car, 5.7% rode in a car, 4.7% use a bike, and 4.7% walk or run.

No one used public transport.
