= The Wood, New Zealand =

Suburb of Nelson, New Zealand

The Wood
- Suburb
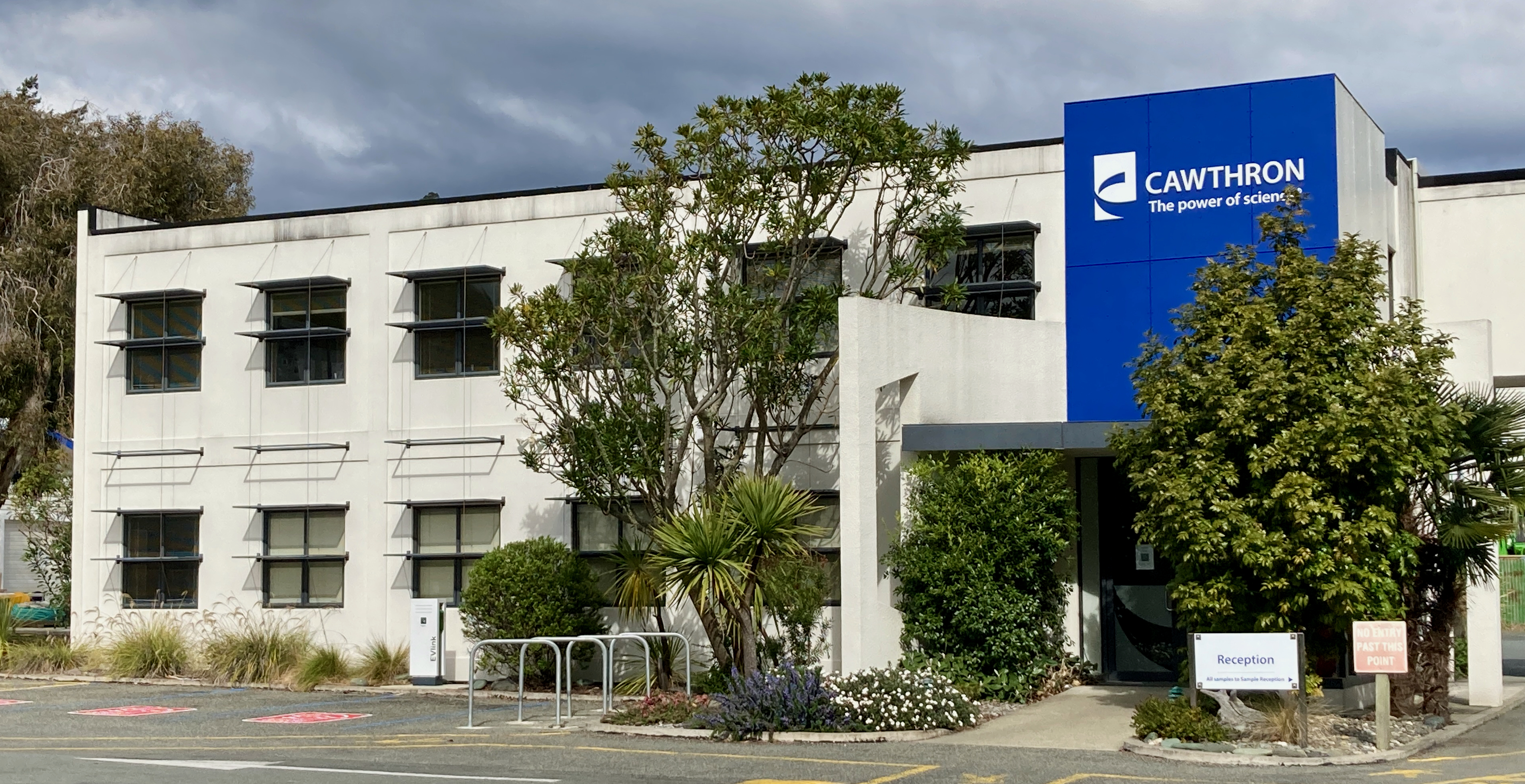
- The Cawthron Institute
- Interactive map of The Wood
- Coordinates: 41.269°S 173.292°E
- Country: New Zealand
- Region: Nelson
- Ward: Central General Ward; Whakatū Māori Ward
- Electorates: Nelson; Te Tai Tonga (Māori)

Government
  - Territorial Authority: Nelson City Council
  - Nelson City Mayor: Nick Smith
  - Nelson MP: Rachel Boyack
  - Te Tai Tonga MP: Tākuta Ferris

Area
  - Total: 1.16 km^{2} (0.45 sq mi)

Population (June 2025)
  - Total: 2,990
  - Density: 2,580/km^{2} (6,680/sq mi)
- Time zone: UTC+12 (NZST)
  - Summer (DST): UTC+13 (NZDT)
- Postcode: 7010
- Area code: 03

The Wood is a suburb of Nelson, New Zealand. It lies just to the north-east of the city centre and adjoins it.

The suburb incorporates Botanical Reserve, a section of Nelson's town belt that includes the trigonometrical geographic centre of New Zealand, Botanical Hill. The reserve borders the Botanical Gardens to the east and Branford Park to the west.

The suburb also has four other public reserves: Guppy Park, Neale Park, Peace Grove and Pepper Tree Park.

== History ==
=== Italian immigration ===
The Wood has a sizeable Italian community. The earliest Italian immigrants were fishermen in the 1860s but the majority of Italian immigrants arrived in the 20th century. The Wood was used for horticulture due to suitable conditions such as lack of frost. Horticulture continued into the 1990s but rising interest rates made the area too expensive and combined with other factors most gardens were sold off and turned into housing in the 1990s.

== Demographics ==
The Wood statistical area covers 1.16 km^{2} (0.45 sq mi). It had an estimated population of 2,990 as of June 2025, with a population density of 2,578 people per km^{2}.

Historical population
Year	Pop.	±% p.a.
2006	2,790	—
2013	2,835	+0.23%
2018	2,907	+0.50%
2023	3,018	+0.75%

The Wood had a population of 3,018 in the 2023 New Zealand census, an increase of 111 people (3.8%) since the 2018 census, and an increase of 183 people (6.5%) since the 2013 census. There were 1,392 males, 1,617 females, and 12 people of other genders in 1,371 dwellings. 3.8% of people identified as LGBTIQ+. The median age was 49.5 years (compared with 38.1 years nationally). There were 378 people (12.5%) aged under 15 years, 408 (13.5%) aged 15 to 29, 1,353 (44.8%) aged 30 to 64, and 882 (29.2%) aged 65 or older.

People could identify as more than one ethnicity. The results were 83.1% European (Pākehā); 9.8% Māori; 3.3% Pasifika; 10.2% Asian; 1.7% Middle Eastern, Latin American and African New Zealanders (MELAA); and 1.9% other, which includes people giving their ethnicity as "New Zealander". English was spoken by 96.6%, Māori by 2.5%, Samoan by 0.2%, and other languages by 15.3%. No language could be spoken by 1.9% (e.g. too young to talk). New Zealand Sign Language was known by 0.7%. The percentage of people born overseas was 32.0, compared with 28.8% nationally.

Religious affiliations were 29.8% Christian, 1.4% Hindu, 1.1% Islam, 0.2% Māori religious beliefs, 1.9% Buddhist, 0.9% New Age, 0.2% Jewish, and 1.6% other religions. People who answered that they had no religion were 56.4%, and 6.9% of people did not answer the census question.

Of those at least 15 years old, 768 (29.1%) people had a bachelor's or higher degree, 1,215 (46.0%) had a post-high school certificate or diploma, and 663 (25.1%) people exclusively held high school qualifications. The median income was $35,700, compared with $41,500 nationally. 231 people (8.8%) earned over $100,000 compared to 12.1% nationally. The employment status of those at least 15 was 1,071 (40.6%) full-time, 342 (13.0%) part-time, and 60 (2.3%) unemployed.
