= Beachville =

- Suburb
- Interactive map of Beachville
- Coordinates: 41°16′15″S 173°16′30″E
- Country: New Zealand
- Region: Nelson
- Territorial authority: Nelson

Government
  - Nelson City Mayor: Nick Smith
  - Nelson MP: Rachel Boyack
  - Te Tai Tonga MP: Tākuta Ferris

Area
  - Total: 0.24 km^{2} (0.093 sq mi)

Population (2023 census)
  - Total: 501
  - Density: 2,100/km^{2} (5,400/sq mi)
- Time zone: UTC+12 (NZST)
  - Summer (DST): UTC+13 (NZDT)
- Postcode: 7010
- Area code: 03

Beachville is an inner suburb of Nelson, New Zealand. It lies at the western edge of Nelson city centre, to the southeast of Port Nelson.

Beachville includes a park, Fountain Reserve, and a public garden, Fountain Place Gardens.

== Demographics ==
Beachville covers 0.24 km^{2} (0.093 sq mi). It is part of the larger Britannia statistical area.

Historical population
Year	Pop.	±% p.a.
2006	468	—
2013	468	+0.00%
2018	552	+3.36%
2023	501	−1.92%

Beachville had a population of 501 in the 2023 New Zealand census, a decrease of 51 people (−9.2%) since the 2018 census, and an increase of 33 people (7.1%) since the 2013 census. There were 249 males, 252 females, and 3 people of other genders in 204 dwellings. 3.6% of people identified as LGBTIQ+. There were 87 people (17.4%) aged under 15 years, 57 (11.4%) aged 15 to 29, 270 (53.9%) aged 30 to 64, and 81 (16.2%) aged 65 or older.

People could identify as more than one ethnicity. The results were 83.2% European (Pākehā); 11.4% Māori; 3.0% Pasifika; 10.8% Asian; 1.2% Middle Eastern, Latin American and African New Zealanders (MELAA); and 3.6% other, which includes people giving their ethnicity as "New Zealander". English was spoken by 94.6%, Māori by 3.6%, Samoan by 0.6%, and other languages by 18.0%. No language could be spoken by 1.2% (e.g. too young to talk). The percentage of people born overseas was 29.9, compared with 28.8% nationally.

Religious affiliations were 17.4% Christian, 1.8% Hindu, 0.6% Islam, 1.2% New Age, and 0.6% other religions. People who answered that they had no religion were 68.3%, and 9.0% of people did not answer the census question.

Of those at least 15 years old, 153 (37.0%) people had a bachelor's or higher degree, 180 (43.5%) had a post-high school certificate or diploma, and 75 (18.1%) people exclusively held high school qualifications. 48 people (11.6%) earned over $100,000 compared to 12.1% nationally. The employment status of those at least 15 was 222 (53.6%) full-time, 66 (15.9%) part-time, and 9 (2.2%) unemployed.

== Education ==
Auckland Point School, a co-educational state primary school for Year 1 to 8 students, is located in Beachville. It had a roll of 84 as of July 2026. It opened in 1927 with a roll of 400. The original brick building was deemed unsafe after the 1929 Murchison and 1968 Inangahua earthquakes, and was demolished in 1974 after considerable debate.

The Nelson Teen Parent Unit is located next to the primary school.
