= Nelson Central =

Central business district of Nelson, New Zealand

- Suburb
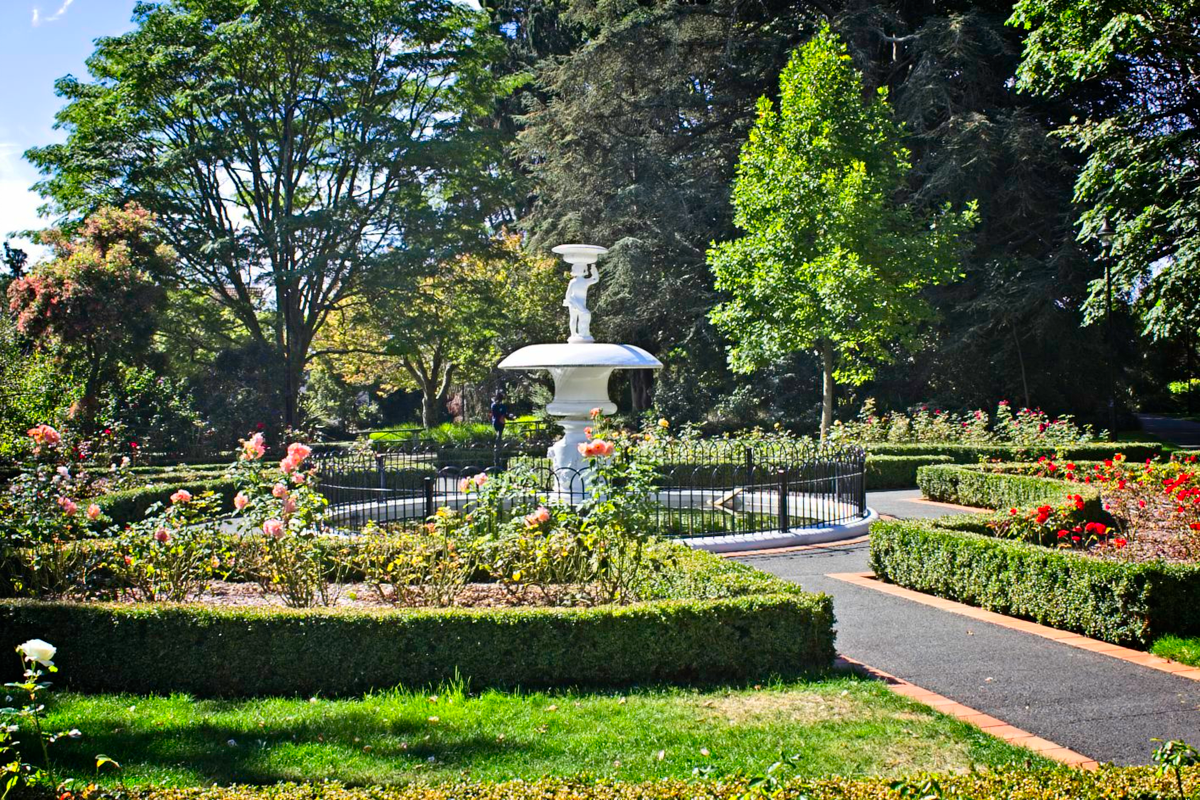
- Queens Garden
- Interactive map of Nelson Central
- Coordinates: 41°16′30″S 173°17′00″E
- Country: New Zealand
- Region: Nelson
- Ward: Central General Ward; Whakatū Māori Ward
- Electorates: Nelson; Te Tai Tonga (Māori)

Government
  - Territorial Authority: Nelson City Council
  - Nelson City Mayor: Nick Smith
  - Nelson MP: Rachel Boyack
  - Te Tai Tonga MP: Tākuta Ferris

Area
  - Total: 1.25 km^{2} (0.48 sq mi)

Population (June 2025)
  - Total: 690
  - Density: 550/km^{2} (1,400/sq mi)
- Time zone: UTC+12 (NZST)
  - Summer (DST): UTC+13 (NZDT)
- Postcode: 7010
- Area code: 03

Nelson Central is the central suburb and central business district of Nelson, New Zealand.

== Amenities ==
The suburb includes the Christ Church Cathedral and the surrounding Church Hill reserve.

Nelson Provincial Museum, the regional museum, is located in Nelson Central. It opened in its first form in 1842, making it New Zealand's first and oldest museum.

The Suter Art Gallery was established in 1899,

Other public reserves and facilities in the area include Anzac Memorial Park, Erin Reserve, Hallowell Cemetery, Old Bank Lane Gardens, Paru Paru Reserve, Princes Lookout Reserve, Quakers Acre Cemetery, Queens Gardens, the Riverside Reserve and Pool Complex, and Rutherford Park.

== Demographics ==
The Nelson Central-Trafalgar statistical area covers 1.25 km^{2} (0.48 sq mi). It had an estimated population of 690 as of June 2025, with a population density of 552 people per km^{2}.

Historical population
Year	Pop.	±% p.a.
2006	483	—
2013	579	+2.62%
2018	675	+3.12%
2023	660	−0.45%

Nelson Central-Trafalgar had a population of 660 in the 2023 New Zealand census, a decrease of 15 people (−2.2%) since the 2018 census, and an increase of 81 people (14.0%) since the 2013 census. There were 369 males, 282 females, and 9 people of other genders in 309 dwellings. 7.7% of people identified as LGBTIQ+. The median age was 40.4 years (compared with 38.1 years nationally). There were 63 people (9.5%) aged under 15 years, 171 (25.9%) aged 15 to 29, 300 (45.5%) aged 30 to 64, and 123 (18.6%) aged 65 or older.

People could identify as more than one ethnicity. The results were 70.0% European (Pākehā); 12.7% Māori; 3.6% Pasifika; 18.6% Asian; 2.3% Middle Eastern, Latin American and African New Zealanders (MELAA); and 3.2% other, which includes people giving their ethnicity as "New Zealander". English was spoken by 96.4%, Māori by 4.1%, Samoan by 0.5%, and other languages by 22.7%. No language could be spoken by 0.9% (e.g. too young to talk). The percentage of people born overseas was 39.1, compared with 28.8% nationally.

Religious affiliations were 27.3% Christian, 4.5% Hindu, 1.8% Islam, 0.5% Māori religious beliefs, 3.2% Buddhist, 0.5% New Age, and 1.8% other religions. People who answered that they had no religion were 54.5%, and 6.4% of people did not answer the census question.

Of those at least 15 years old, 153 (25.6%) people had a bachelor's or higher degree, 303 (50.8%) had a post-high school certificate or diploma, and 147 (24.6%) people exclusively held high school qualifications. The median income was $34,500, compared with $41,500 nationally. 30 people (5.0%) earned over $100,000 compared to 12.1% nationally. The employment status of those at least 15 was 273 (45.7%) full-time, 93 (15.6%) part-time, and 36 (6.0%) unemployed.

== Education ==
Nelson College for Girls is a state secondary school for Year 9 to 13 girls. It has a roll of 964 as of July 2026. It opened in 1883.

Nelson College for Girls Preparatory School is a private preparatory school for Year 7 to 8 girls, based on the Nelson College for Girls campus. It has a roll of 96. In the 1920s the Prep School moved temporarily to Fairfield House at the end of Trafalgar Street.
