= Britannia Heights, New Zealand =

Britannia Heights
- Suburb
- Interactive map of Britannia Heights
- Coordinates: 41°16′30″S 173°15′40″E
- Country: New Zealand
- Region: Nelson
- Ward: Central General Ward; Stoke-Tāhunanui General Ward; Whakatū Māori Ward
- Electorates: Nelson; Te Tai Tonga (Māori)

Government
  - Territorial Authority: Nelson City Council
  - Nelson City Mayor: Nick Smith
  - Nelson MP: Rachel Boyack
  - Te Tai Tonga MP: Tākuta Ferris

Area
  - Total: 0.82 km^{2} (0.32 sq mi)

Population (2023 census)
  - Total: 1,158
  - Density: 1,400/km^{2} (3,700/sq mi)
- Time zone: UTC+12 (NZST)
  - Summer (DST): UTC+13 (NZDT)
- Postcode: 7010
- Area code: 03

Britannia Heights is a major inner suburb of Nelson, New Zealand. It lies on State Highway 6 to the southwest of Nelson city centre, on the shore of Tasman Bay / Te Tai-o-Aorere, between Stepneyville and Tāhunanui.

The suburb has two local reserves: Moncrieff Reserve and Pipers Park Reserve.

== Demographics ==
Britannia Heights covers 0.82 km^{2} (0.32 sq mi). It is part of the statistical areas of Washington and Tahuna Hills.

Historical population
Year	Pop.	±% p.a.
2006	1,020	—
2013	1,053	+0.46%
2018	1,101	+0.90%
2023	1,158	+1.01%

Britannia Heights had a population of 1,158 in the 2023 New Zealand census, an increase of 57 people (5.2%) since the 2018 census, and an increase of 105 people (10.0%) since the 2013 census. There were 579 males and 582 females in 456 dwellings. 3.4% of people identified as LGBTIQ+. There were 171 people (14.8%) aged under 15 years, 141 (12.2%) aged 15 to 29, 522 (45.1%) aged 30 to 64, and 315 (27.2%) aged 65 or older.

People could identify as more than one ethnicity. The results were 89.6% European (Pākehā); 12.4% Māori; 1.8% Pasifika; 4.7% Asian; 1.0% Middle Eastern, Latin American and African New Zealanders (MELAA); and 2.6% other, which includes people giving their ethnicity as "New Zealander". English was spoken by 97.7%, Māori by 3.9%, Samoan by 0.8%, and other languages by 12.2%. No language could be spoken by 1.8% (e.g. too young to talk). New Zealand Sign Language was known by 0.8%. The percentage of people born overseas was 30.3, compared with 28.8% nationally.

Religious affiliations were 28.5% Christian, 0.5% Islam, 0.8% Māori religious beliefs, 2.1% Buddhist, 0.5% New Age, 0.3% Jewish, and 1.8% other religions. People who answered that they had no religion were 58.3%, and 7.0% of people did not answer the census question.

Of those at least 15 years old, 351 (35.6%) people had a bachelor's or higher degree, 477 (48.3%) had a post-high school certificate or diploma, and 156 (15.8%) people exclusively held high school qualifications. 165 people (16.7%) earned over $100,000 compared to 12.1% nationally. The employment status of those at least 15 was 420 (42.6%) full-time, 165 (16.7%) part-time, and 15 (1.5%) unemployed.
