= Glenduan =

Town in Nelson, New Zealand

- Town
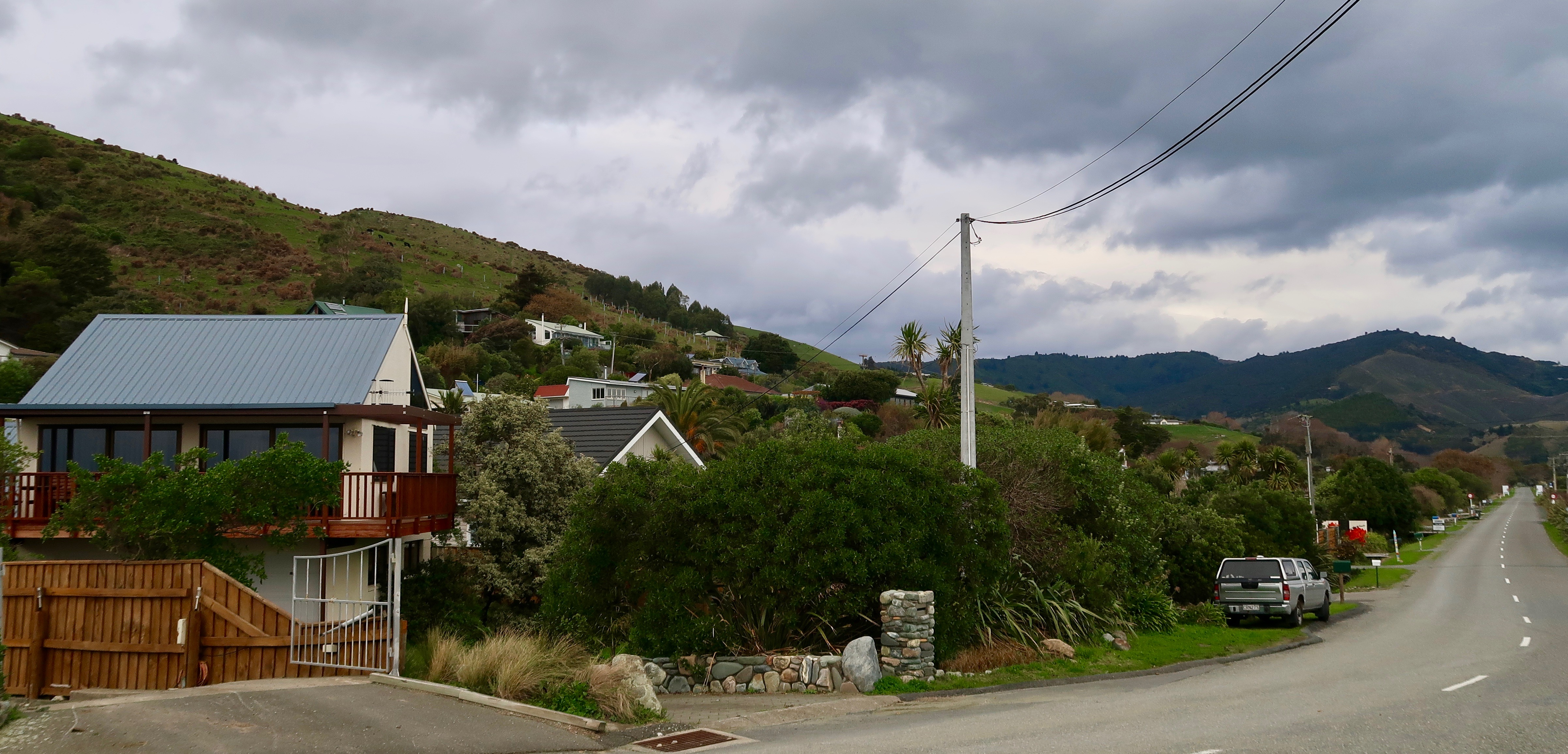
- Glenduan
- Interactive map of Glenduan
- Coordinates: 41°11′10″S 173°21′50″E
- Country: New Zealand
- Region: Nelson
- Ward: Central General Ward; Whakatū Māori Ward
- Electorates: Nelson; Te Tai Tonga (Māori)

Government
  - Territorial Authority: Nelson City Council
  - Mayor of Nelson: Nick Smith
  - Nelson MP: Rachel Boyack
  - Te Tai Tonga MP: Tākuta Ferris

Area
  - Total: 8.02 km^{2} (3.10 sq mi)

Population (2023 Census)
  - Total: 474
  - Density: 59.1/km^{2} (153/sq mi)

Glenduan (also called The Glen) is a small township lying to the north of Nelson, New Zealand. It lies on the shore of Tasman Bay / Te Tai-o-Aorere between the northern end of Boulder Bank and Pepin Island.

The settlement's main park, Glenduan Reserve, is a public beach and local park.

Horoirangi Marine Reserve is located offshore of Glenduan.

== Demographics ==
Glenduan locality covers 8.02 km^{2} (3.10 sq mi). It is part of the Nelson Rural statistical area.

Historical population
Year	Pop.	±% p.a.
2006	378	—
2013	447	+2.42%
2018	459	+0.53%
2023	474	+0.65%

Glenduan had a population of 474 in the 2023 New Zealand census, an increase of 15 people (3.3%) since the 2018 census, and an increase of 27 people (6.0%) since the 2013 census. There were 225 males, 249 females, and 3 people of other genders in 177 dwellings. 3.8% of people identified as LGBTIQ+. There were 69 people (14.6%) aged under 15 years, 63 (13.3%) aged 15 to 29, 237 (50.0%) aged 30 to 64, and 99 (20.9%) aged 65 or older.

People could identify as more than one ethnicity. The results were 95.6% European (Pākehā), 7.6% Māori, 0.6% Pasifika, 3.2% Asian, and 3.8% other, which includes people giving their ethnicity as "New Zealander". English was spoken by 99.4%, Māori by 1.9%, and other languages by 12.0%. No language could be spoken by 1.9% (e.g. too young to talk). New Zealand Sign Language was known by 2.5%. The percentage of people born overseas was 25.9, compared with 28.8% nationally.

Religious affiliations were 23.4% Christian, 0.6% Hindu, 0.6% Māori religious beliefs, 0.6% New Age, and 1.9% other religions. People who answered that they had no religion were 60.8%, and 12.0% of people did not answer the census question.

Of those at least 15 years old, 135 (33.3%) people had a bachelor's or higher degree, 210 (51.9%) had a post-high school certificate or diploma, and 72 (17.8%) people exclusively held high school qualifications. 39 people (9.6%) earned over $100,000 compared to 12.1% nationally. The employment status of those at least 15 was 171 (42.2%) full-time, 81 (20.0%) part-time, and 12 (3.0%) unemployed.
