= The Brook, Nelson =

Suburb of Nelson, New Zealand

The Brook
- Suburb
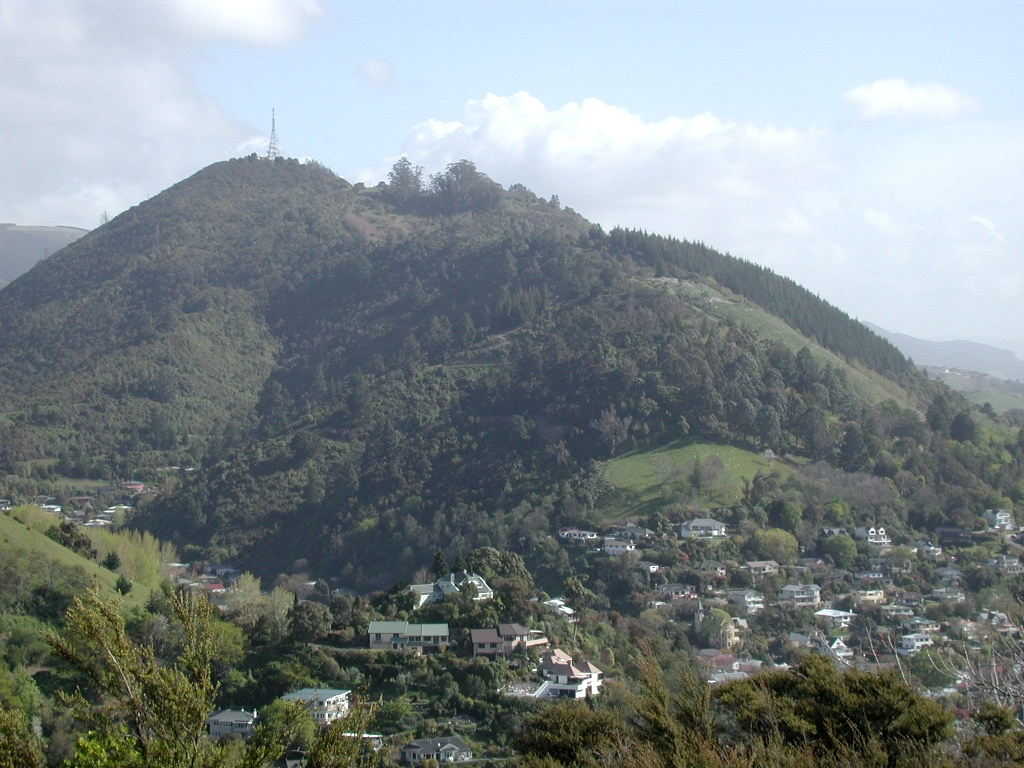
- Grampians Reserve in The Brook
- Interactive map of The Brook
- Coordinates: 41.296°S 173.298°E
- Country: New Zealand
- Region: Nelson
- Ward: Central General Ward; Whakatū Māori Ward
- Electorates: Nelson; Te Tai Tonga (Māori)

Government
  - Territorial Authority: Nelson City Council
  - Nelson City Mayor: Nick Smith
  - Nelson MP: Rachel Boyack
  - Te Tai Tonga MP: Tākuta Ferris

Area
  - Total: 6.91 km^{2} (2.67 sq mi)
  - Land: 6.91 km^{2} (2.67 sq mi)
  - Water: 0 km^{2} (0 sq mi)

Population (June 2025)
  - Total: 1,940
  - Density: 281/km^{2} (727/sq mi)
- Time zone: UTC+12 (NZST)
  - Summer (DST): UTC+13 (NZDT)
- Postcode: 7010
- Area code: 03

The Brook is one of the suburbs of Nelson, New Zealand. It lies to the south of Nelson and is the location of the Brook Waimārama Sanctuary, a conservation project at the head of the Brook Valley.

== Geography ==
The Brook covers a land area of 6.91 km^{2}.

It has seven public reserves: Andrews Farm Reserve, Betsy Eyre Park, Brook Park, Grampians Reserve, Grove Reserve, Tantragee Reserve and Wards Reserve.

The Seymour Avenue Heritage Precinct consists of a tree lined street at the North West corner of the suburb. The avenue consist of a short street with a mix of transitional villa and Californian bungalow style houses. The initial subdivision occurred in the 1910s with additional development on the 1940s. The subdivision was created on land originally part of a 20 acre property owned by Alfred Fell who built the first house on the land in 1854. This house was purchased by Nathaniel Edwards in 1860 and was considerably extended in the Victorian Gothic Revivalist style.

== History ==
The estimated population of The Brook reached 1,700 in 1996.

It reached 1,720 in 2001, 1,605 in 2006, 1,857 in 2013, and 1,992 in 2018.

== Demography ==
The Brook has an estimated population of 1,940 as of June 2025, with a population density of 281 people per km^{2}.

Historical population
Year	Pop.	±% p.a.
2006	1,605	—
2013	1,857	+2.11%
2018	1,992	+1.41%
2023	1,896	−0.98%

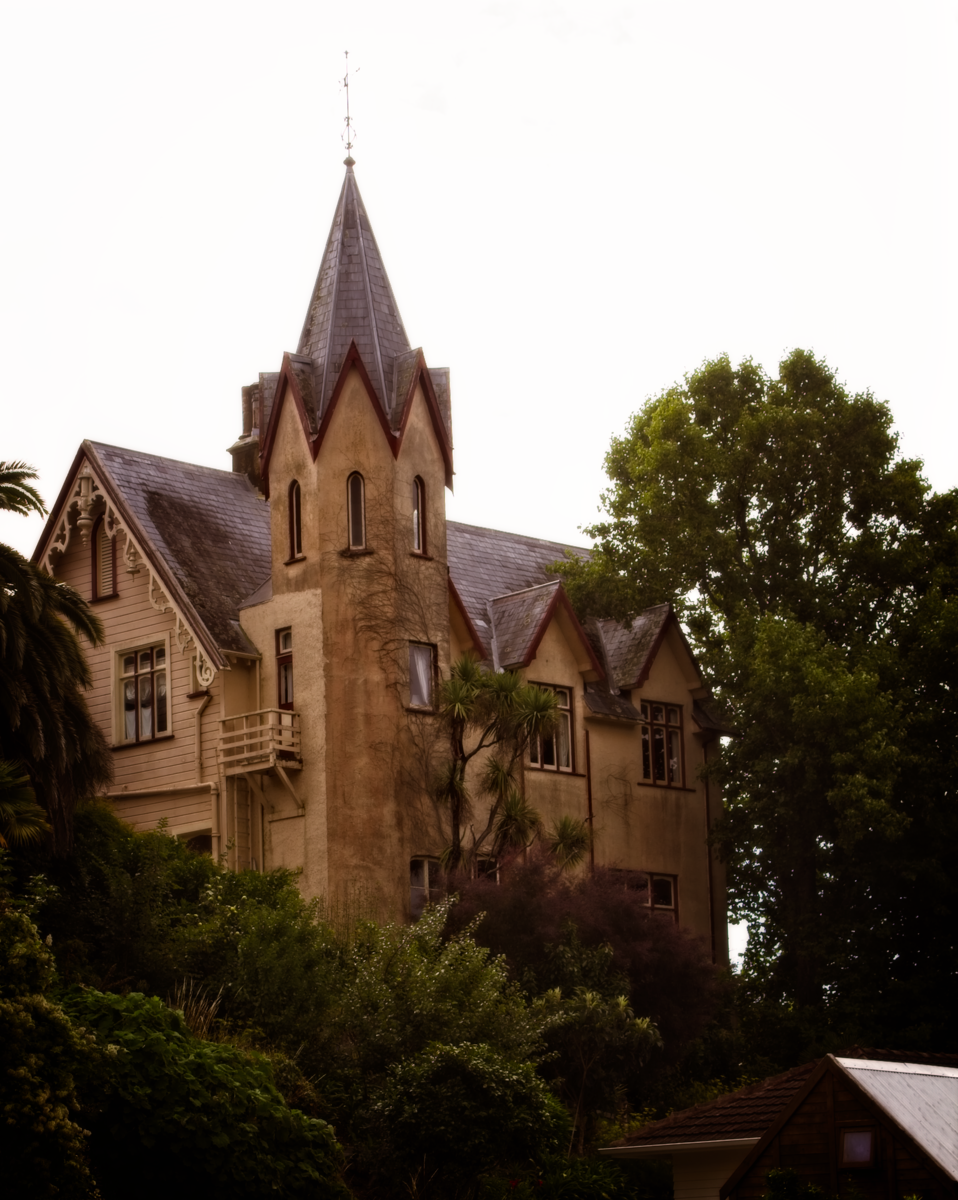
Warwick House

The Brook had a population of 1,896 in the 2023 New Zealand census, a decrease of 96 people (−4.8%) since the 2018 census, and an increase of 39 people (2.1%) since the 2013 census. There were 918 males, 966 females, and 9 people of other genders in 732 dwellings. 4.3% of people identified as LGBTIQ+. The median age was 39.7 years (compared with 38.1 years nationally). There were 384 people (20.3%) aged under 15 years, 291 (15.3%) aged 15 to 29, 951 (50.2%) aged 30 to 64, and 270 (14.2%) aged 65 or older.

People could identify as more than one ethnicity. The results were 90.8% European (Pākehā); 9.0% Māori; 2.7% Pasifika; 5.9% Asian; 1.6% Middle Eastern, Latin American and African New Zealanders (MELAA); and 1.7% other, which includes people giving their ethnicity as "New Zealander". English was spoken by 97.3%, Māori by 2.8%, Samoan by 0.8%, and other languages by 13.0%. No language could be spoken by 1.6% (e.g. too young to talk). New Zealand Sign Language was known by 0.6%. The percentage of people born overseas was 29.1%, compared with 28.8% nationally.

Religious affiliations were 18.2% Christian, 0.6% Hindu, 0.2% Islam, 1.7% Buddhist, 0.9% New Age, and 1.1% other religions. People who answered that they had no religion were 69.5%, and 7.6% of people did not answer the census question.

Of those at least 15 years old, 519 (34.3%) people had a bachelor's or higher degree, 711 (47.0%) had a post-high school certificate or diploma, and 285 (18.8%) people exclusively held high school qualifications. The median income was $40,800, compared with $41,500 nationally. 141 people (9.3%) earned over $100,000 compared to 12.1% nationally. The employment status of those at least 15 was 765 (50.6%) full-time, 267 (17.7%) part-time, and 33 (2.2%) unemployed.

== Economy ==
In 2018, 7.0% worked in manufacturing, 9.3% worked in construction, 7.0% worked in hospitality, 4.2% worked in transport, 9.6% worked in education, and 14.0% worked in healthcare.

== Transport ==
As of 2018, among those who commute to work, 66.6% drove a car, 3.1% rode in a car, 0.0% use public transport, 10.1% use a bike, and 10.1% walk or run.

In August 2023, bus services across Nelson were upgraded and extended, and The Brook now has a direct connection to Nelson Airport, with electric buses running every half hour between 7am and 7pm.
