= Mai Tai (disambiguation) =

A Mai Tai is a cocktail made of rum, Curaçao liqueur, orgeat syrup, and lime juice.

Mai Tai may also refer to:

- Mai Tai (band), Dutch group formed in 1983
- American pro wrestler Afa Anoa'i Jr who used the ring name Mai Tai Anoa'i
- Maitai, New Zealand, suburb of Nelson, New Zealand
- Mai Tai Sing (1923–2018), American actress and businesswoman

== See also ==
- Maotai, Chinese liquor
- Ita Mai Tai, Cretaceous-early Cenozoic seamount in the Pacific Ocean
- "Mai Tais", 2019 song by Train, featuring Skylar Grey
