= Whakatu =

Whakatu or Whakatū may refer to the following places in New Zealand:

- Whakatu, Hawke's Bay, a suburb of Hastings
- Whakatū, the Māori name of Nelson, New Zealand

- Wakatu, a suburb of Nelson
