= Port Nelson, New Zealand =

Port Nelson
- Suburb
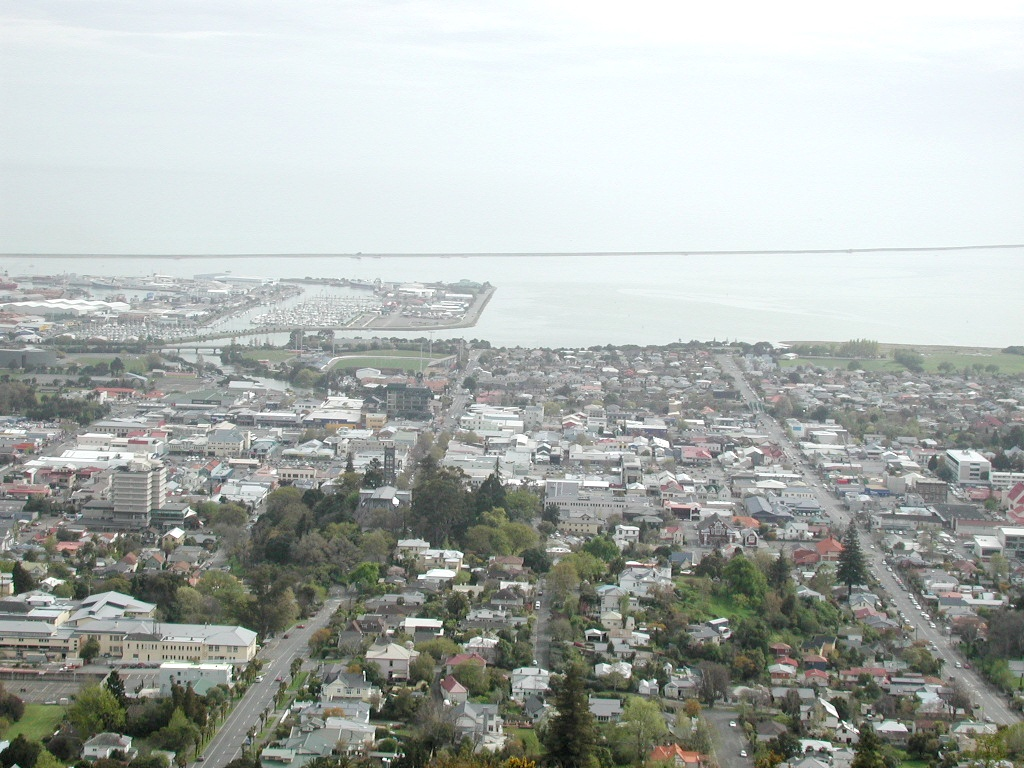
- Nelson, with Port Nelson in the back left
- Interactive map of Port Nelson
- Coordinates: 41°15′50″S 173°16′40″E
- Country: New Zealand
- Region: Nelson
- Ward: Central General Ward; Whakatū Māori Ward
- Electorates: Nelson; Te Tai Tonga (Māori)

Government
  - Territorial Authority: Nelson City Council
  - Nelson City Mayor: Nick Smith
  - Nelson MP: Rachel Boyack
  - Te Tai Tonga MP: Tākuta Ferris

Area
  - Total: 0.98 km^{2} (0.38 sq mi)

Population (June 2025)
  - Total: 180
  - Density: 180/km^{2} (480/sq mi)
- Time zone: UTC+12 (NZST)
  - Summer (DST): UTC+13 (NZDT)
- Postcode: 7010
- Area code: 03

Port Nelson, as its name suggests, is the main port area of Nelson, New Zealand.

It lies to the northwest of Nelson city centre, to the north of Washington Valley, at the southern end of Nelson Haven. The harbour entrance lies at the southwestern end of Boulder Bank, immediately to the west of Port Nelson.

== Geography ==
Port Nelson covers a land area of 0.98 km^{2}.

Nelson Marina, a marina owned by Nelson City Council, is located in the Port Nelson area.

The council also owns Custom House Reserve, a small area of public reserve around the port's custom house.

== History ==
The estimated population of Port Nelson reached 40 in 1996.

It reached 90 in 2001, 99 in 2006, and 33 in 2018.

== Demography ==
Port Nelson had an estimated population of 180 as of June 2025, with a population density of 184 people per km^{2}.

Historical population
Year	Pop.	±% p.a.
2006	99	—
2013	81	−2.83%
2018	84	+0.73%
2023	123	+7.93%

Port Nelson had a population of 123 in the 2023 New Zealand census, an increase of 39 people (46.4%) since the 2018 census, and an increase of 42 people (51.9%) since the 2013 census. There were 90 males and 30 females in 93 dwellings. 4.9% of people identified as LGBTIQ+. The median age was 40.1 years (compared with 38.1 years nationally). There were 6 people (4.9%) aged under 15 years, 30 (24.4%) aged 15 to 29, 60 (48.8%) aged 30 to 64, and 30 (24.4%) aged 65 or older.

People could identify as more than one ethnicity. The results were 70.7% European (Pākehā), 22.0% Māori, 7.3% Pasifika, 17.1% Asian, and 4.9% other, which includes people giving their ethnicity as "New Zealander". English was spoken by 100.0%, Māori by 4.9%, and other languages by 14.6%. New Zealand Sign Language was known by 2.4%. The percentage of people born overseas was 34.1, compared with 28.8% nationally.

Religious affiliations were 29.3% Christian, 2.4% Hindu, and 2.4% New Age. People who answered that they had no religion were 56.1%, and 9.8% of people did not answer the census question.

Of those at least 15 years old, 18 (15.4%) people had a bachelor's or higher degree, 66 (56.4%) had a post-high school certificate or diploma, and 33 (28.2%) people exclusively held high school qualifications. The median income was $42,000, compared with $41,500 nationally. 9 people (7.7%) earned over $100,000 compared to 12.1% nationally. The employment status of those at least 15 was 60 (51.3%) full-time and 15 (12.8%) part-time.

== Transport ==
As of 2018, among those who commute to work, 44.4% drove a car, 11.1% rode in a car,11.1% use a bike, and 11.1% walk or run. No one took public transport.
