= Maitai, New Zealand =

Suburb of Nelson, New Zealand

Maitai
- Suburb
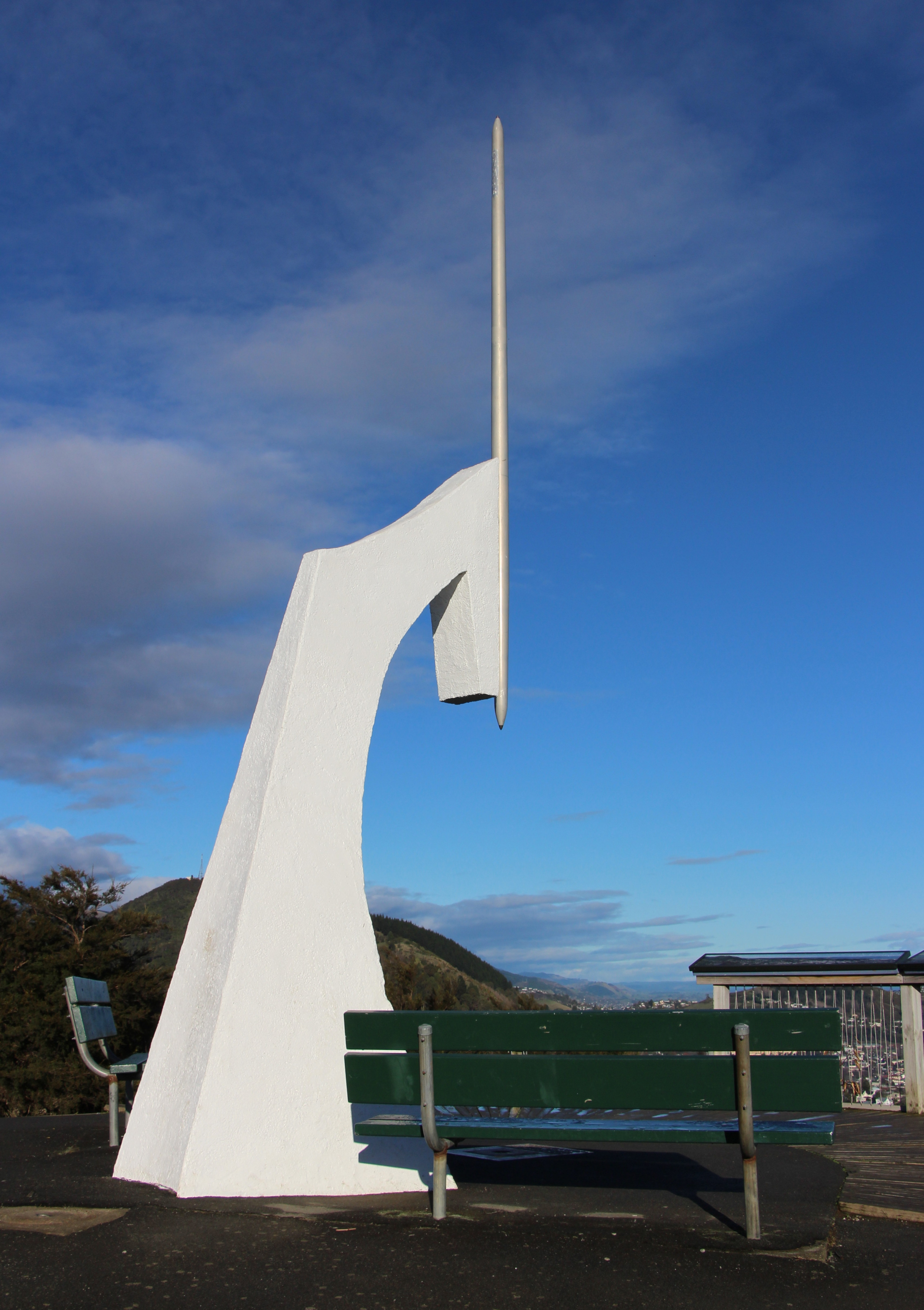
- Marker at Centre of New Zealand
- Interactive map of Maitai
- Coordinates: 41°16′30″S 173°17′50″E
- Country: New Zealand
- Region: Nelson
- Ward: Central General Ward; Whakatū Māori Ward
- Electorates: Nelson; Te Tai Tonga (Māori)

Government
  - Territorial Authority: Nelson City Council
  - Nelson City Mayor: Nick Smith
  - Nelson MP: Rachel Boyack
  - Te Tai Tonga MP: Tākuta Ferris

Area
  - Total: 0.94 km^{2} (0.36 sq mi)
  - Land: 0.94 km^{2} (0.36 sq mi)
  - Water: 0 km^{2} (0 sq mi)

Population (June 2025)
  - Total: 1,290
  - Density: 1,400/km^{2} (3,600/sq mi)
- Time zone: UTC+12 (NZST)
  - Summer (DST): UTC+13 (NZDT)
- Postcode: 7010
- Area code: 03

Maitai is an inner suburb of Nelson, New Zealand. It lies at the eastern edge of Nelson city centre, immediately to the south of The Wood, on the northern bank of the Maitai River. A monument representing the location of the geographic centre of New Zealand is located in Maitai.

== Geography ==
Maitai covers an area of 0.94 km^{2}, all of which is land.

Maitai has several public reserves, many located within Nelson's town belt, including the Botanical Gardens cricket ground, Branford Park, Maitai Cricket Ground, Maitai Arboretum, Maitai River Esplanade, Sharland Hill Reserve and Sir Stanley Whitehead Park.

Maitai Valley Road, a steep, winding road linking Nelson with Maitai Reservoir and Pelorus Bridge, follows the northern bank of the Maitai River.

Hanby Park, located on the southern side of the river, includes walking and BMX trails. There is also a residential area near the park.

A popular swimming hole, Black Hole, is located at a bend of the Maitai River.

== History ==
The estimated population of Maitai was 1,480 in 1996.

It was recorded as 1,410 in 2001, 1,332 in 2006, 1,314 in 2013, and 1,362 in 2018.

== Demography ==
Maitai has an estimated population of 1,290 as of June 2025, with a population density of 1,372 people per km^{2}.

Historical population
Year	Pop.	±% p.a.
2006	1,332	—
2013	1,314	−0.19%
2018	1,362	+0.72%
2023	1,293	−1.03%

Maitai had a population of 1,293 in the 2023 New Zealand census, a decrease of 69 people (−5.1%) since the 2018 census, and a decrease of 21 people (−1.6%) since the 2013 census. There were 609 males, 669 females, and 9 people of other genders in 564 dwellings. 4.6% of people identified as LGBTIQ+. The median age was 49.9 years (compared with 38.1 years nationally). There were 183 people (14.2%) aged under 15 years, 189 (14.6%) aged 15 to 29, 603 (46.6%) aged 30 to 64, and 318 (24.6%) aged 65 or older.

People could identify as more than one ethnicity. The results were 87.7% European (Pākehā); 7.9% Māori; 1.4% Pasifika; 7.2% Asian; 1.9% Middle Eastern, Latin American and African New Zealanders (MELAA); and 3.9% other, which includes people giving their ethnicity as "New Zealander". English was spoken by 98.1%, Māori by 4.2%, Samoan by 0.2%, and other languages by 17.6%. No language could be spoken by 0.9% (e.g. too young to talk). New Zealand Sign Language was known by 0.2%. The percentage of people born overseas was 36.7, compared with 28.8% nationally.

Religious affiliations were 23.0% Christian, 0.7% Hindu, 0.2% Islam, 0.2% Māori religious beliefs, 1.4% Buddhist, 0.7% New Age, 0.5% Jewish, and 1.2% other religions. People who answered that they had no religion were 64.3%, and 7.9% of people did not answer the census question.

Of those at least 15 years old, 465 (41.9%) people had a bachelor's or higher degree, 450 (40.5%) had a post-high school certificate or diploma, and 192 (17.3%) people exclusively held high school qualifications. The median income was $38,700, compared with $41,500 nationally. 129 people (11.6%) earned over $100,000 compared to 12.1% nationally. The employment status of those at least 15 was 507 (45.7%) full-time, 192 (17.3%) part-time, and 21 (1.9%) unemployed.

== Economy ==
In 2018, 6.0% of the workforce worked in manufacturing, 7.3% worked in construction, 10.5% worked in hospitality, 2.8% worked in transport, 12.1% worked in education, and 14.1% worked in healthcare.

== Transport ==
In 2018, among those who commuted to work, 52.8% drove a car, 2.0% rode in a car, 14.1% use a bike, and 14.1% walk or run.
