= Moana, Nelson =

Suburb of Nelson, New Zealand

Moana
- Suburb
- Interactive map of Moana
- Coordinates: 41°16′50″S 173°15′10″E
- Country: New Zealand
- Region: Nelson
- Ward: Stoke-Tāhunanui General Ward; Whakatū Māori Ward
- Electorates: Nelson; Te Tai Tonga (Māori)

Government
  - Territorial Authority: Nelson City Council
  - Nelson City Mayor: Nick Smith
  - Nelson MP: Rachel Boyack
  - Te Tai Tonga MP: Tākuta Ferris

Area
  - Total: 2.68 km^{2} (1.03 sq mi)

Population (June 2025)
  - Total: 2,960
  - Density: 1,100/km^{2} (2,860/sq mi)
- Time zone: UTC+12 (NZST)
  - Summer (DST): UTC+13 (NZDT)
- Postcode: 7010
- Area code: 03

Moana is one of the suburbs of Nelson, New Zealand.

It lies on State Highway 6 to the southwest of Nelson city centre, and immediately to the northeast of Tāhunanui.

There are two small local parks in Moana: Bisley Reserve and Bruno Reserve. Both are owned and operated by Nelson City Council.

== Demographics ==
The Tahuna Hills statistical area, which includes Moana and part of Britannia Heights, covers 2.68 km^{2} (1.03 sq mi). It had an estimated population of 2,960 as of June 2025, with a population density of 1,104 people per km^{2}.

Historical population
Year	Pop.	±% p.a.
2006	2,430	—
2013	2,652	+1.26%
2018	2,847	+1.43%
2023	2,949	+0.71%

Tahuna Hills had a population of 2,949 in the 2023 New Zealand census, an increase of 102 people (3.6%) since the 2018 census, and an increase of 297 people (11.2%) since the 2013 census. There were 1,464 males, 1,476 females, and 12 people of other genders in 1,167 dwellings. 3.7% of people identified as LGBTIQ+. The median age was 49.7 years (compared with 38.1 years nationally). There were 438 people (14.9%) aged under 15 years, 381 (12.9%) aged 15 to 29, 1,368 (46.4%) aged 30 to 64, and 765 (25.9%) aged 65 or older.

People could identify as more than one ethnicity. The results were 89.8% European (Pākehā); 11.1% Māori; 2.1% Pasifika; 3.8% Asian; 1.6% Middle Eastern, Latin American and African New Zealanders (MELAA); and 3.6% other, which includes people giving their ethnicity as "New Zealander". English was spoken by 98.4%, Māori by 2.4%, Samoan by 0.7%, and other languages by 12.1%. No language could be spoken by 1.3% (e.g. too young to talk). New Zealand Sign Language was known by 0.3%. The percentage of people born overseas was 26.2, compared with 28.8% nationally.

Religious affiliations were 25.5% Christian, 0.6% Hindu, 0.1% Islam, 0.2% Māori religious beliefs, 0.8% Buddhist, 0.7% New Age, 0.1% Jewish, and 1.4% other religions. People who answered that they had no religion were 63.7%, and 6.9% of people did not answer the census question.

Of those at least 15 years old, 774 (30.8%) people had a bachelor's or higher degree, 1,275 (50.8%) had a post-high school certificate or diploma, and 459 (18.3%) people exclusively held high school qualifications. The median income was $42,100, compared with $41,500 nationally. 339 people (13.5%) earned over $100,000 compared to 12.1% nationally. The employment status of those at least 15 was 1,143 (45.5%) full-time, 408 (16.2%) part-time, and 42 (1.7%) unemployed.
