= Wakatu =

Suburb of Nelson, New Zealand

- Suburb
- Interactive map of Wakatu
- Coordinates: 41°17′50″S 173°14′40″E
- Country: New Zealand
- Region: Nelson
- Ward: Stoke-Tāhunanui General Ward; Whakatū Māori Ward
- Electorates: Nelson; Te Tai Tonga (Māori)

Government
  - Territorial Authority: Nelson City Council
  - Nelson City Mayor: Nick Smith
  - Nelson MP: Rachel Boyack
  - Te Tai Tonga MP: Tākuta Ferris

Area
  - Total: 1.39 km^{2} (0.54 sq mi)

Population (2023 census)
  - Total: 1,140
  - Density: 820/km^{2} (2,120/sq mi)
- Time zone: UTC+12 (NZST)
  - Summer (DST): UTC+13 (NZDT)
- Postcode: 7011
- Area code: 03

Wakatu (also spelt Whakatu, as in the Māori name for the Nelson area) is an industrial and residential suburb of Nelson in New Zealand.

It lies on State Highway 6 to the southwest of Nelson city centre and northeast of Stoke, inland from Nelson Airport.

== Demographics ==
Wakatu covers 1.39 km^{2} (0.54 sq mi). It is part of the larger Tahuna Hills statistical area.

Historical population
Year	Pop.	±% p.a.
2006	714	—
2013	912	+3.56%
2018	1,020	+2.26%
2023	1,140	+2.25%

Wakatu had a population of 1,140 in the 2023 New Zealand census, an increase of 120 people (11.8%) since the 2018 census, and an increase of 228 people (25.0%) since the 2013 census. There were 564 males, 579 females, and 6 people of other genders in 411 dwellings. 4.2% of people identified as LGBTIQ+. There were 198 people (17.4%) aged under 15 years, 159 (13.9%) aged 15 to 29, 525 (46.1%) aged 30 to 64, and 258 (22.6%) aged 65 or older.

People could identify as more than one ethnicity. The results were 88.9% European (Pākehā); 12.9% Māori; 3.7% Pasifika; 4.2% Asian; 1.6% Middle Eastern, Latin American and African New Zealanders (MELAA); and 2.9% other, which includes people giving their ethnicity as "New Zealander". English was spoken by 98.4%, Māori by 2.4%, Samoan by 0.5%, and other languages by 10.8%. No language could be spoken by 1.6% (e.g. too young to talk). The percentage of people born overseas was 21.6, compared with 28.8% nationally.

Religious affiliations were 24.5% Christian, 1.1% Hindu, 0.3% Māori religious beliefs, 1.3% Buddhist, 0.3% New Age, and 1.8% other religions. People who answered that they had no religion were 63.4%, and 8.4% of people did not answer the census question.

Of those at least 15 years old, 210 (22.3%) people had a bachelor's or higher degree, 513 (54.5%) had a post-high school certificate or diploma, and 228 (24.2%) people exclusively held high school qualifications. 90 people (9.6%) earned over $100,000 compared to 12.1% nationally. The employment status of those at least 15 was 462 (49.0%) full-time, 126 (13.4%) part-time, and 15 (1.6%) unemployed.

== Parks ==
Wakatu has four local parks: Blackwood Reserve, Douglas Reserve, Highview Reserve and Norgate Reserve.
