= Tāhunanui =

Suburb of Nelson, New Zealand

- Suburb
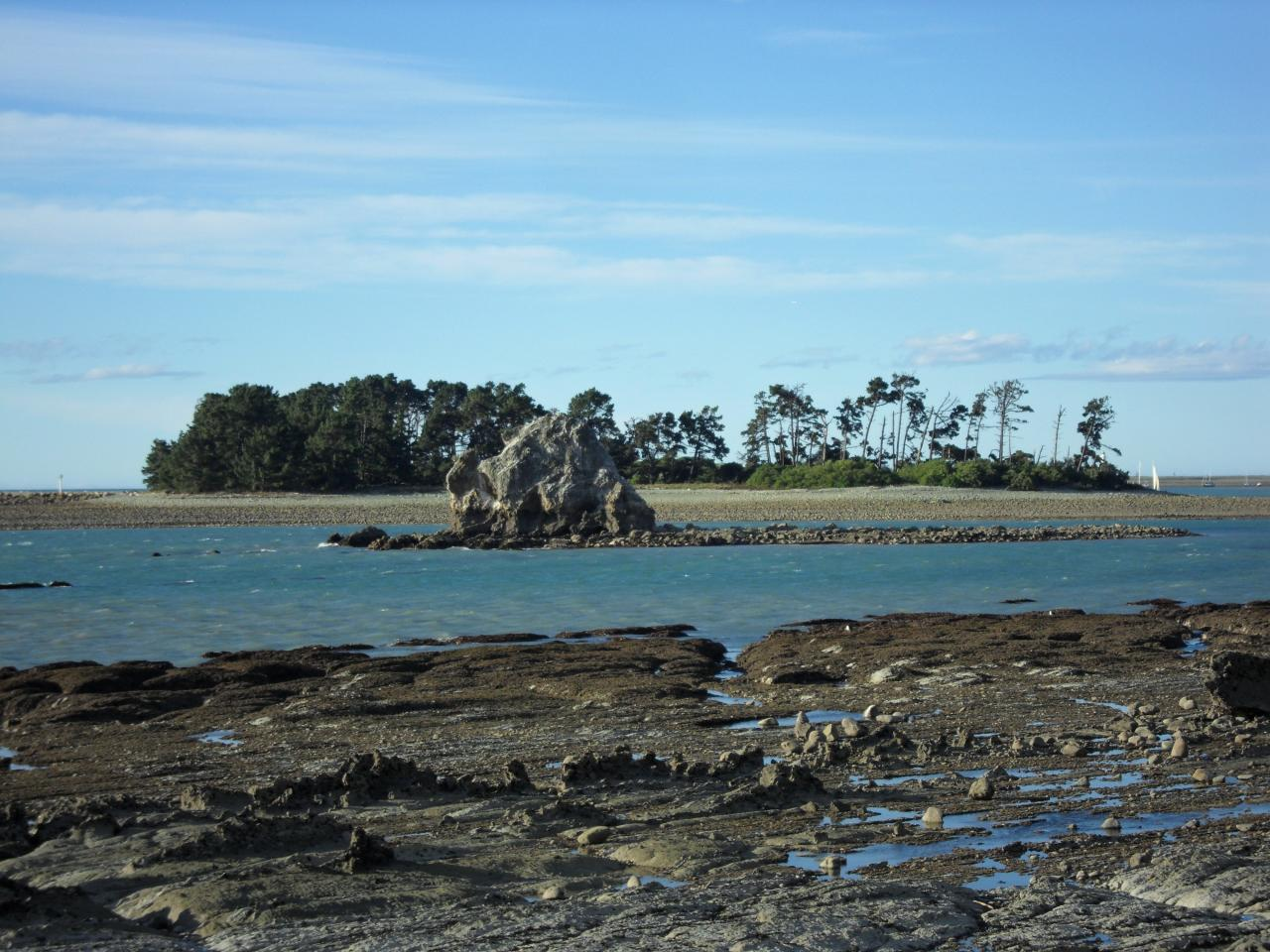
- Tāhunanui Beach
- Interactive map of Tāhunanui
- Coordinates: 41°17′S 173°15′E
- Country: New Zealand
- Region: Nelson
- Ward: Stoke-Tāhunanui General Ward; Whakatū Māori Ward
- Electorates: Nelson; Te Tai Tonga (Māori)

Government
  - Territorial Authority: Nelson City Council
  - Nelson City Mayor: Nick Smith
  - Nelson MP: Rachel Boyack
  - Te Tai Tonga MP: Tākuta Ferris

Area
  - Total: 1.61 km^{2} (0.62 sq mi)

Population (June 2025)
  - Total: 2,970
  - Density: 1,840/km^{2} (4,780/sq mi)
- Time zone: UTC+12 (NZST)
  - Summer (DST): UTC+13 (NZDT)
- Postcode: 7011
- Area code: 03

Tāhunanui is one of the suburbs of Nelson, on the South Island of New Zealand. It lies between Port Nelson and Nelson Airport and is the site of the main beach for Nelson with a shoreline on the Tasman Bay.

The New Zealand Ministry for Culture and Heritage gives a translation of "large sandbank" for Tāhunanui.

== Geography ==
=== Tāhunanui Beach ===
Tāhunanui Beach is Nelson's main beach. It lies on the shore of Tasman Bay / Te Tai-o-Aorere on the northern edge of a peninsula which stretches west from Tāhunanui. The beach is notable for its long shallow slope, and for this reason is extremely popular with local swimmers, as the water is generally calm and warmed by the sun.

=== Oyster Island ===
Oyster Island is an island reserve located offshore from Tāhunanui.

=== Parks ===
Tāhunanui has several local parks: Annesbrook Youth Park, Bolt Reserve, Burrell Park, Centennial Park, Paddys Knob Reserve, Tāhunanui Recreation Reserve, Tasman Heights Reserve and Tosswill Reserve.

There is also an Airport Peninsula Esplanade on the way into Nelson Airport.

== Demographics ==
The Tāhunanui statistical area covers 1.61 km^{2} (0.62 sq mi). It had an estimated population of 2,970 as of June 2025, with a population density of 1,845 people per km^{2}.

Historical population
Year	Pop.	±% p.a.
2006	2,493	—
2013	2,589	+0.54%
2018	2,745	+1.18%
2023	2,892	+1.05%

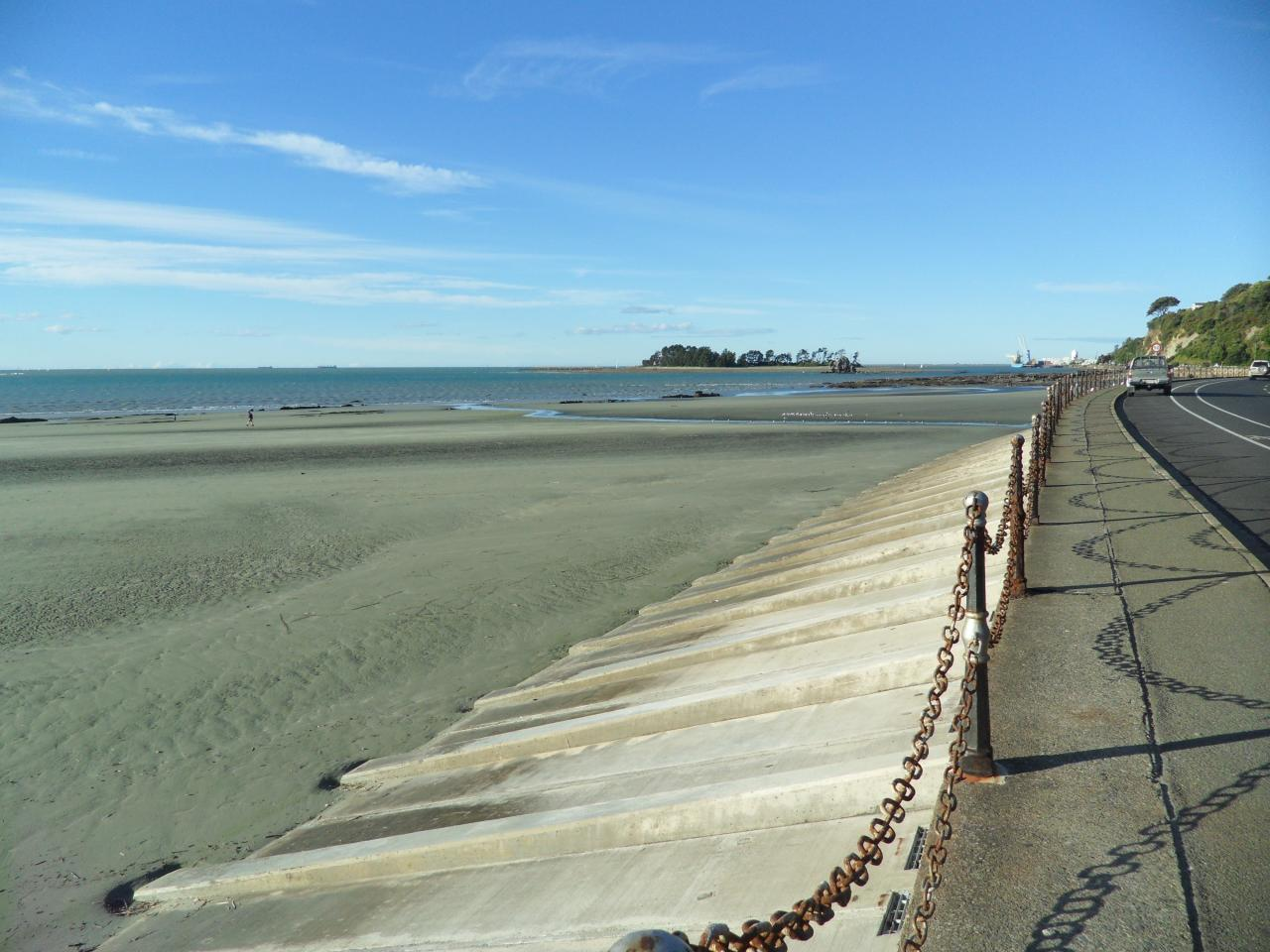
Tāhunanui Beach

Tāhunanui had a population of 2,892 in the 2023 New Zealand census, an increase of 147 people (5.4%) since the 2018 census, and an increase of 303 people (11.7%) since the 2013 census. There were 1,425 males, 1,449 females, and 18 people of other genders in 1,308 dwellings. 3.3% of people identified as LGBTIQ+. The median age was 39.9 years (compared with 38.1 years nationally). There were 456 people (15.8%) aged under 15 years, 519 (17.9%) aged 15 to 29, 1,398 (48.3%) aged 30 to 64, and 519 (17.9%) aged 65 or older.

People could identify as more than one ethnicity. The results were 83.2% European (Pākehā); 16.8% Māori; 4.4% Pasifika; 7.6% Asian; 1.3% Middle Eastern, Latin American and African New Zealanders (MELAA); and 2.6% other, which includes people giving their ethnicity as "New Zealander". English was spoken by 97.1%, Māori by 3.0%, Samoan by 0.6%, and other languages by 9.8%. No language could be spoken by 2.2% (e.g. too young to talk). New Zealand Sign Language was known by 0.8%. The percentage of people born overseas was 23.0, compared with 28.8% nationally.

Religious affiliations were 27.6% Christian, 0.8% Hindu, 0.4% Islam, 0.4% Māori religious beliefs, 1.0% Buddhist, 0.7% New Age, 0.1% Jewish, and 1.8% other religions. People who answered that they had no religion were 59.9%, and 7.3% of people did not answer the census question.

Of those at least 15 years old, 456 (18.7%) people had a bachelor's or higher degree, 1,311 (53.8%) had a post-high school certificate or diploma, and 669 (27.5%) people exclusively held high school qualifications. The median income was $36,300, compared with $41,500 nationally. 105 people (4.3%) earned over $100,000 compared to 12.1% nationally. The employment status of those at least 15 was 1,173 (48.2%) full-time, 366 (15.0%) part-time, and 90 (3.7%) unemployed.
