= Osmose New Zealand Ltd v Wakeling =

- Court: High Court of New Zealand
- Full case name: Osmose New Zealand Ltd v R N WAKELING First Defendant AND N R SMITH Second Defendant AND TELEVISION NEW ZEALAND First Named Third Party AND RADIO NEW ZEALAND Second Named Third Party AND APN NEW ZEALAND LTD Third Named Third Party AND FAIRFAX NEW ZEALAND LTD Fourth Named Third Party
- Decided: 19 December 2006
- Citation: [2007] 1 NZLR 841
- Transcript: forms.justice.govt.nz

Court membership
- Judge sitting: Harrison J

Keywords
- negligence

Osmose New Zealand Ltd v Wakeling [2007] 1 NZLR 841 is a cited case in New Zealand regarding claims in defamation and the defence of free speech.

== Background ==
Osmose New Zealand Limited manufactured and sold a timber treatment product that Dr Wakeling and Dr Smith in their opinions as scientists, claimed did not work as it should have, contributing to the "leaky homes crisis". Wakeling's statements on the matter were repeated on Radio New Zealand and in The New Zealand Herald.

Osmose subsequently sued Wakeling for defamation for $14,737,778, and Wakelin sought to have RNZ and the Herald joined as co-defendants on the defamation claim, and they claim that re-publication of Wakelings original statements was protected by privilege, as well as under "Lange".

== Held ==
The High Court ruled that in the absence of any malice, the mere republication of statements was privileged, and so was not defamation.
