= Haulashore Island =

Island in New Zealand

Coordinates: 41.2688°S 173.2575°E

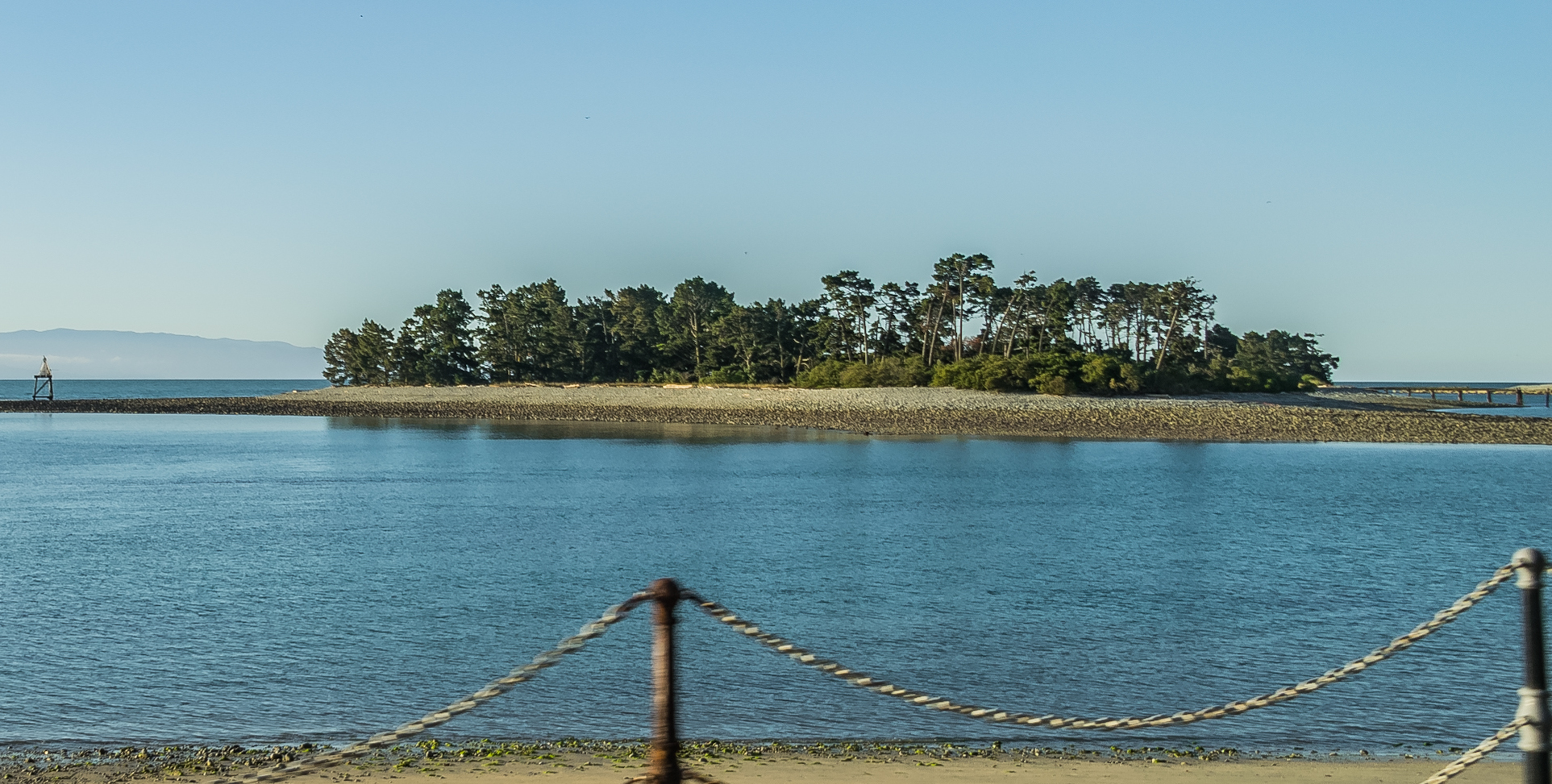
Haulashore Island viewed from the Nelson foreshore

Haulashore Island is a small island in Tasman Bay, near Nelson, New Zealand. Formed in 1901, it was at one time a part of Boulder Bank. There is a narrow channel between the island and Arrow Rock. The 0.5 hectares (1.2 acres) island has had rabbits since its formation; ferrets were released on the island in the 1960s to control the rabbit population.
