= Nick Smith (New Zealand politician) =

New Zealand politician (born 1964)

His Worship the Honourable Nick Smith
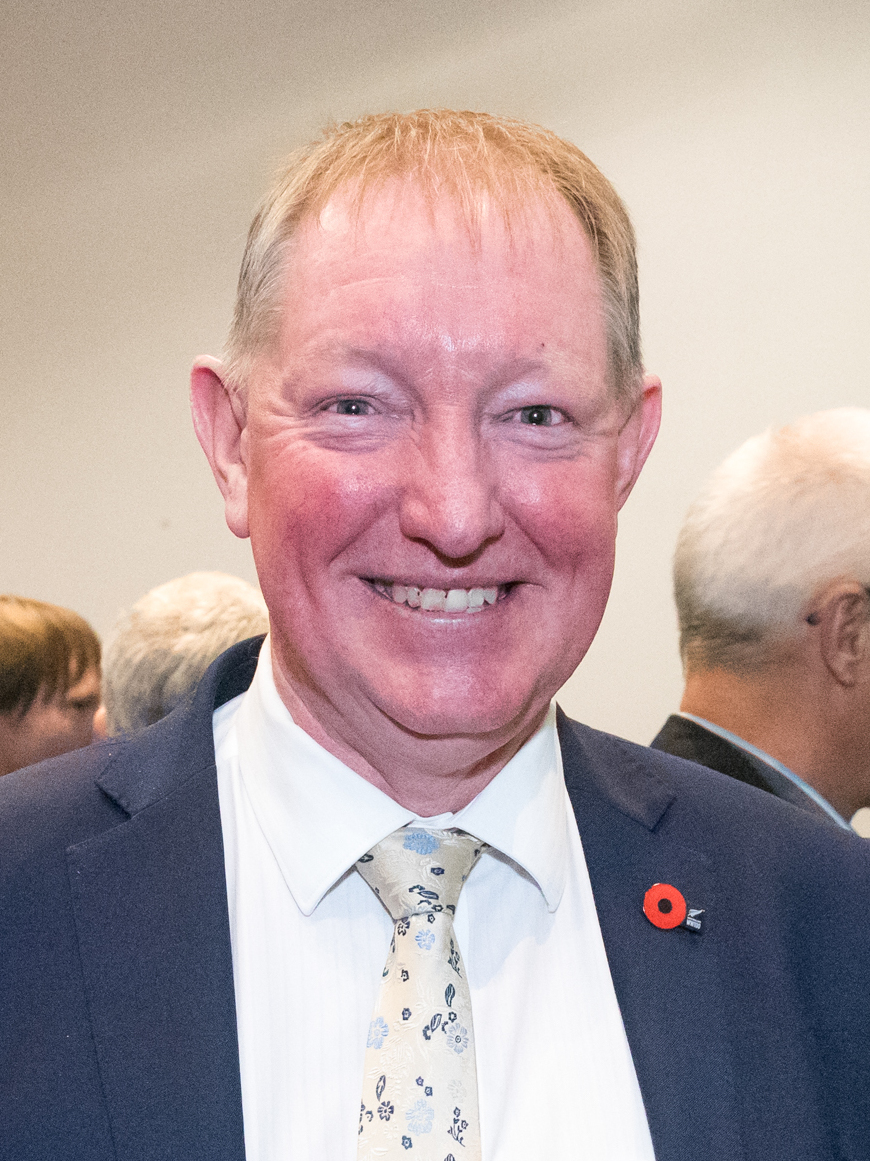
- Smith in 2016

30th Mayor of Nelson
- Incumbent
- Assumed office 14 October 2022
- Preceded by: Rachel Reese

14th Minister for the Environment
- In office 8 October 2014 – 26 October 2017
- Prime Minister: John Key; Bill English
- Preceded by: Amy Adams
- Succeeded by: David Parker
- In office 19 November 2008 – 21 March 2012
- Prime Minister: John Key
- Preceded by: Trevor Mallard
- Succeeded by: Amy Adams

1st Minister for Building and Housing
- In office 8 October 2014 – 20 December 2016
- Prime Minister: John Key; Bill English
- Preceded by: Himself (as Minister of Housing and Minister of Building & Construction)
- Succeeded by: Himself (as Minister for Building & Construction)

6th Minister of Conservation
- In office 22 January 2013 – 8 October 2014
- Prime Minister: John Key
- Preceded by: Kate Wilkinson
- Succeeded by: Maggie Barry
- In office 16 December 1996 – 10 December 1999
- Prime Minister: Jim Bolger; Jenny Shipley
- Preceded by: Simon Upton
- Succeeded by: Sandra Lee

Minister of Housing
- In office 22 January 2013 – 8 October 2014
- Prime Minister: John Key
- Preceded by: Phil Heatley

40th Minister of Education
- In office 31 January 1999 – 10 December 1999
- Prime Minister: Jenny Shipley
- Preceded by: Wyatt Creech
- Succeeded by: Trevor Mallard

9th Minister for ACC
- In office 19 November 2008 – 14 December 2011
- Prime Minister: John Key
- Preceded by: Maryan Street
- Succeeded by: Judith Collins

Deputy Leader of the National Party
- In office 28 October 2003 – 17 November 2003
- Leader: Don Brash
- Preceded by: Roger Sowry
- Succeeded by: Gerry Brownlee

Member of the New Zealand Parliament for National party list
- In office 17 October 2020 – 10 June 2021
- Succeeded by: Harete Hipango

Member of the New Zealand Parliament for Nelson
- In office 12 October 1996 – 17 October 2020
- Preceded by: John Blincoe
- Succeeded by: Rachel Boyack

Member of the New Zealand Parliament for Tasman
- In office 27 October 1990 – 12 October 1996
- Preceded by: Ken Shirley
- Succeeded by: Constituency abolished

Personal details
- Born: Nicolas Rex Smith; 24 December 1964 (age 61) Rangiora, Canterbury Region, New Zealand
- Party: National Party
- Occupation: Engineer
- Website: nick4nelson.co.nz

Nicolas Rex Smith (born 24 December 1964) is a New Zealand politician who served as a Member of Parliament (MP) for the National Party from 1990 to 2021. He served as a Cabinet minister, holding various posts including Minister for Building and Housing, Minister for the Environment, Minister for Climate Change Issues, and Minister of Local Government. For a brief time between October and November 2003 he was the deputy leader of the National Party, then in opposition under Don Brash.

Smith represented the Nelson electorate from 1996 to 2020 and, before that, was the member for Tasman from 1990 to 1996. Following his defeat in the Nelson electorate in the 2020 election, he served as a list MP for less than a year before retiring from parliament on 10 June 2021 after multiple allegations of bullying were made against him. Smith was elected Mayor of Nelson in the 2022 New Zealand local elections, and was re-elected in 2025.

== Education and early career ==
Smith was born in Rangiora, Canterbury, in 1964, the son of John Smith and Anne Smith. His father was born in New South Wales and came to New Zealand to start a contracting business, building drains and bridges. He has seven siblings; three sisters and four brothers. His father and two brothers all own independent construction crane hire businesses.

Smith was educated at Rangiora High School and was an AFS Scholar to the U.S. He studied at the University of Canterbury where he earned a Bachelor of Engineering degree with first-class honours in civil engineering, and a PhD with a thesis titled The Residual Strength of Soils and Landslide Stability.

Before entering parliament, he worked as an engineer for the Rangiora County Council, and as director of his family construction company. He also served on the Rangiora District Council, unsuccessfully standing while still at secondary school in 1983, and successfully standing again in 1986 aged 21.

== Member of Parliament ==
=== Fourth National Government, 1990–1999 ===
New Zealand Parliament
Years	Term	Electorate	List	Party
1990–1993	43rd	Tasman		National
1993–1996	44th	Tasman		National
1996–1999	45th	Nelson	30	National
1999–2002	46th	Nelson	8	National
2002–2005	47th	Nelson	3	National
2005–2008	48th	Nelson	5	National
2008–2011	49th	Nelson	5	National
2011–2014	50th	Nelson	6	National
2014–2017	51st	Nelson	13	National
2017–2020	52nd	Nelson	15	National
2020–2021	53rd	List	18	National

Nick Smith has been involved in the National Party since his university days. He stood in the 1990 election as the party's candidate in the Tasman electorate. For the 1996 election, Tasman was abolished, and most of its territory was merged into the neighbouring Nelson electorate. Smith opted to contest Nelson and defeated Labour incumbent John Blincoe in the election. He held Nelson until the 2020 general election.

As well as the full ministerial posts mentioned below, Smith has also been an Associate Minister of the Immigration, Social Welfare and Treaty Negotiation portfolios.

==== Cabinet Minister ====
In 1996, after serving six years in parliament, Smith was elevated to Cabinet, becoming Minister of Conservation. With this appointment, he replaced the outgoing Minister, Denis Marshall, who had resigned as an eventual consequence of the Cave Creek disaster. In 1997 he gained the additional responsibility of Minister of Corrections. In early 1999, he dropped the Corrections portfolio and became Minister of Education. When National was defeated in the 1999 general election, Smith continued to serve as his party's education spokesperson.

=== Opposition years, 1999–2008 ===
==== Leadership struggles ====
Nick Smith was a supporter of Bill English's bid to replace Jenny Shipley as party leader. When English was successful, Smith's position within the party rose. When English was himself challenged by Don Brash, Smith was one of English's strongest defenders, working very hard to win support against Brash. Eventually, however, English was defeated.

Smith was appointed to the position of deputy leader, presumably to placate members of the English camp. He took up this position on 28 October 2003. Soon, however, he was challenged from within the party based on his behaviour after his elevation, which critics described as "irrational" and "paranoid". Smith's defenders said that the claims were exaggerated and that Smith was merely suffering from stress and exhaustion. Smith returned to Nelson on "stress leave".

When Smith returned to parliament, however, he found himself challenged for the deputy leadership by Gerry Brownlee. Smith and his supporters were angry at this, saying that Brownlee's supporters had taken advantage of Smith's absence to deliberately misrepresent Smith as unstable. Smith was also angry that neither Brownlee nor Brash (who appeared now to support Brownlee) had given any indication of the upcoming challenge. Smith was defeated and lost the deputy leadership on 17 November 2003.

==== Contempt of Court ====
In late March 2004, Smith was found guilty of contempt of court. He had been asked to assist a constituent with a Family Court case and made several public comments which broke the court's confidentiality rules and were also found to have pressured a witness in the case. Smith's defence was that he was exercising his responsibility as a constituency MP to aid a constituent and that his public utterances in the matter had served the public interest, but these claims were rejected by the court. The Speaker, Jonathan Hunt, held that contempt of court was insufficient to warrant expulsion from Parliament, as it did not fall within the statutory definition of a crime.

Smith considered seeking a renewed public mandate through a by-election, but no by-election was held after leaders of other parties criticised the idea. Smith stood again in the 2005 general election and kept his seat with a greatly increased majority, his personal share of the vote increasing from 46.8% to 54.9% and his overall majority from 4,232 to 10,226.

=== Fifth National Government, 2009–2017 ===
When National and the new leader, John Key, won the 2008 general election, Smith was appointed Minister for the Environment, Minister Responsible for Climate Change Issues, and Minister for the Accident Compensation Corporation, and was ranked sixth in Cabinet.

==== Defamation case 2010 ====
In April 2010, The New Zealand Herald reported that Smith had his legal fees for two separate defamation cases in 1999 and 2005 paid by the taxpayer. Smith stated that the legal fees for the 2005 case "totalled about $270,000."

In June 2010, the New Zealand Herald reported that preservatives producer Osmose New Zealand was taking a defamation case against Smith in the High Court in Auckland. Osmose New Zealand alleges that Smith's statements made in July 2005 about the timber product, T1.2, destroyed the product's reputation caused the company to lose more than $14 million in estimated profits. On 10 June 2010, Smith settled the case by issuing an apology and making an undisclosed payment. Smith was quoted by the Dominion Post as saying "No public money is involved in the settlement, although I have been very grateful to have received $209,000 of public money from the Parliamentary Service".

==== Climate change ====
Smith has been the National Party's Climate Change spokesman when in opposition and has held the post of Minister for Climate Change Issues.

In May 2005, Smith, while criticising the Labour Government's proposed carbon tax, stated to Parliament that the National Party intended to move to a comprehensive emissions trading permit system.

In November 2005, Smith made several statements criticising the Labour Government's proposed policy of implementing a carbon tax:

- "The madness of the Government's new carbon tax is that New Zealanders will be the only people in the world paying it. It will drive up the costs of living and undermine the competitiveness of New Zealand business for negligible environmental gain."
- "Labour Ministers may take pride in being toasted at International Climate conferences for being so bold and brave, but there is no justification for New Zealand going out in the cold by itself on this issue."
- "New Zealand's greenhouse gas emissions made up only 0.4% of the global total and on a per capita basis our emissions are half those of countries like Australia and the United States. We are the only Southern Hemisphere country with binding legal obligations under Kyoto and giants like China and India have got off scot-free."

From January 2008, Smith was giving speeches as National's Climate Change Spokesman. In one speech, he stated there was no question that the destabilising of the Earth's climate, caused by increased greenhouse gases in the atmosphere, was the "number one environmental issue".

After the 2008 general election, Smith was appointed Minister for Climate Change Issues. The Nelson Mail described the appointment as the logical choice given Smith's role as the National Party's climate change spokesman and his role in the National 'Blue-Green' group.

In December 2008, Smith announced a review of the New Zealand Emissions Trading Scheme which had only just been adopted in September via the Climate Change Response (Emissions Trading) Amendment Act 2008.

On 24 September 2009, Smith introduced the Climate Change Response (Moderated Emissions Trading) Amendment Bill for its first reading in Parliament. This bill amended the New Zealand Emissions Trading Scheme and it received the Royal assent on 7 December 2009.

In November 2009, Smith stated in a speech to Federated Farmers that climate change is a global tragedy of the commons. It has significant consequences and the harm will fall on future generations. Economically, in terms of trade access, and environment, New Zealand must do its fair share. As it is a complex diabolical problem with huge economic implications for societies based on fossil fuel use, climate change policies must be substantive and realistic.

In 2010, Smith was reported by The Press as saying the basic science of climate change was sound and that climate deniers who leapt on errors by the IPCC should subject their "flaky" research to the same level of scrutiny as the IPCC reports.

==== Environment Canterbury ====
While Environment Minister in 2010, Smith dismissed all the elected councillors at Environment Canterbury and replaced them with government-appointed commissioners. At the time, Smith's brother and his company were facing charges from the council.

In 2017, a statue of Smith defecating into a glass of water was placed outside the Environment Canterbury office by protestors.

==== Resignation ====
Smith resigned from all his Cabinet portfolios on 21 March 2012, after admitting that he had written on Minister for Accident Compensation Corporation (ACC) letterhead to the Chief Executive of the ACC on behalf of a former National Party activist. In accepting the resignation, John Key said "it's quite clear he should have made his conflict of interest also known, he shouldn't have had anything to do with the complainant, he should have delegated that responsibility as other ministers do".

==== Housing, conservation, and environment ====
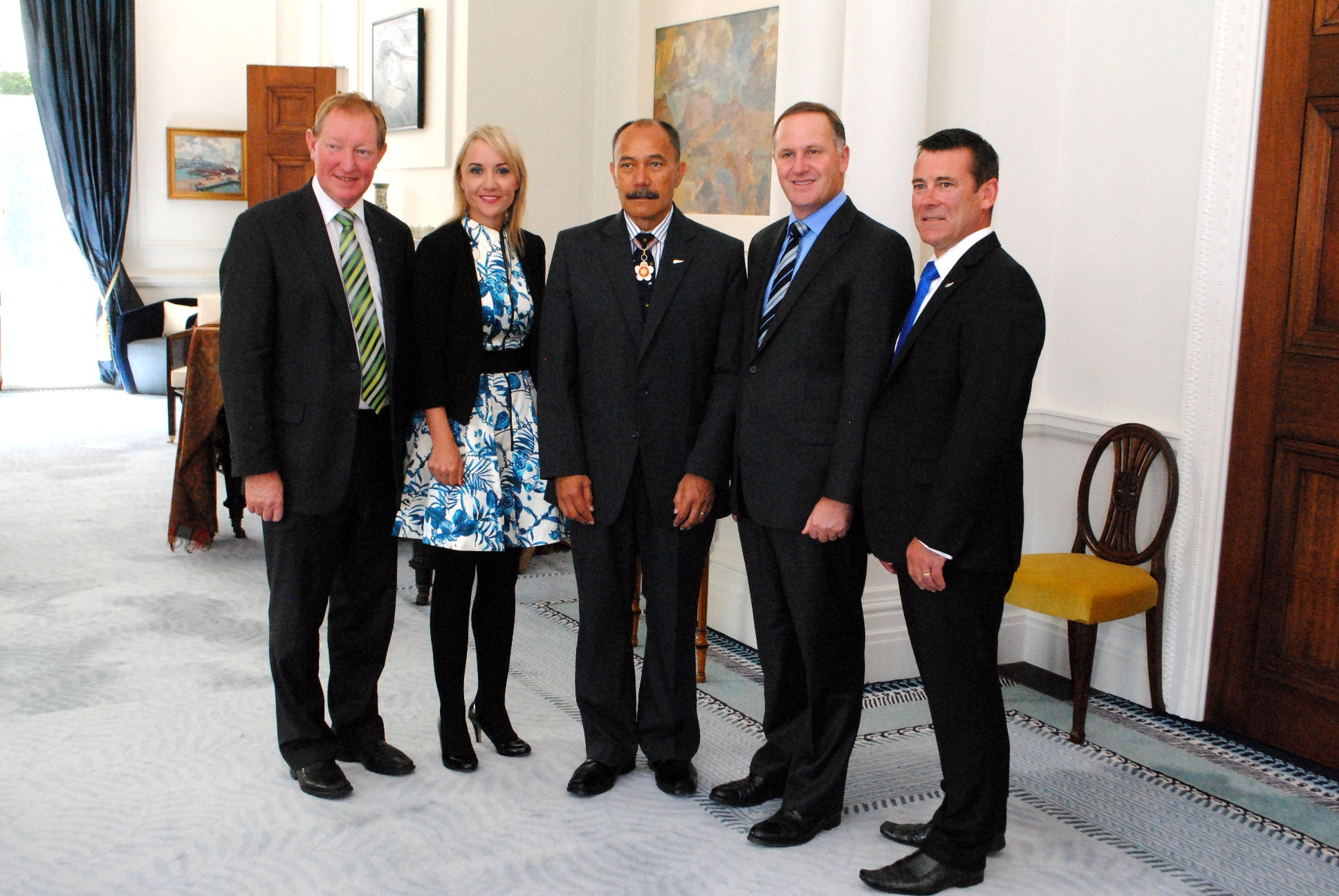
Smith at his swearing-in as a Cabinet minister in January 2013

On 22 January 2013, Smith was returned to the Cabinet and appointed to the Offices of Minister of Conservation and Minister of Housing.

Smith was re-elected in Nelson during the 2014 general election, defeating Labour candidate Maryan Street by 7,605 votes. Following the re-election of National, he served as Minister of Building and Housing and Minister of Environment.

=== Opposition, 2017–2021 ===
Nick Smith was re-elected in Nelson during the 2017 general election, defeating Labour candidate Rachel Boyack by 4,283 votes. He became National's Spokesperson for Electoral Reform and State Services (including Open Government) portfolios in the Shadow Cabinet of Simon Bridges. Smith was named as the party's new spokesperson for Crown–Māori Relations in January 2019.

In March 2018, Smith became the Father of the House in March 2018, having served continuously since the 1990 general election. Following his resignation in June 2021, Smith was succeeded as "Father of the House" by Speaker of the House Trevor Mallard.

Smith, in his capacity as National's electoral reform spokesperson, criticised in March 2019 the Labour members of Parliament's Justice Select Committee for blocking China expert and political scientist Anne-Marie Brady from testifying at a select committee hearing about interference from the Chinese Communist Party and its local proxies in the 2017 general election. Raymond Huo, the Chair of the Justice Select Committee, had declined Brady's application on procedural grounds that she had submitted her application five months after the deadline in September 2018. Smith criticised the Labour members of the select committee for blocking Brady because it ignored Justice Minister Andrew Little's instruction that the committee considers the issue of foreign interference. As a result, the Labour Government reversed its initial decision to exclude Brady.

On 8 May 2019, Smith was named by Speaker Mallard for misconduct in the house. No MP had been named by the Speaker since 2006, when Smith was named by Assistant Speaker Ann Hartley. Smith had also been named on two earlier occasions: in 2001 by Chairperson of the Committee of the Whole House Geoff Braybrooke, and in 2003 by Speaker Jonathan Hunt.

On 25 June 2020, Smith was escorted out of the House of Representatives by the Serjeant-at-Arms for refusing to leave when asked to by the Assistant Speaker, Adrian Rurawhe, who was enforcing the earlier ejection of Smith because he was arguing with Speaker Mallard. As he was leaving, Smith shouted, "what sort of a Nazi establishment is running the place, seriously." Smith is the first person to be escorted out of the House by the Serjeant-at-Arms since the late 1980s, when Robert Muldoon was escorted out.

During the 2020 New Zealand general election, Smith lost his seat in Nelson to Labour candidate Rachel Boyack by a final margin of 4,525 votes. However, he was ranked 18th on National's party list, which was enough for him to remain in Parliament as a list MP.

Owing to the resignation of fellow National MP David Carter at the 2020 general election, Smith became the sponsor of a private member's bill seeking to repeal the controversial Electoral (Integrity) Amendment Act 2018. Smith's member's bill was defeated during its second reading on 9 June 2021 when the Labour Party used its outright majority to block its passage. The second reading was deferred until 9 June 2021. The repeal bill was defeated by 65 (Labour) to 55 (National, Greens, ACT, and the Māori Party).

==== Retirement from Parliament ====
On 31 May 2021, Smith released a statement announcing his resignation from Parliament, to take effect on 10 June. In his statement he said that he had decided some time earlier that he would not serve the full parliamentary term, as following the loss of his electorate seat, he had found that being a list MP "is just not me," and there had also been "recent changes in family circumstances which require me to give greater support." Concerning the precise timing of his resignation, however, he said that "Parliamentary Services have been conducting a confidential inquiry into a verbal altercation in my Wellington office last July that has not concluded" and that he had been advised on 28 May that the existence of the inquiry and its details had been leaked to the media, and would be published on 1 June. He further said in his statement that "It is inappropriate for employment disputes to be litigated in public. I will put on the record that I regret the incident, I apologised at the time and I apologise again today. I have decided the best course of action for the parties involved, the National Party, my family and myself is to retire now." 1News reported that "Smith had a complaint from a male staffer saying he was being bullied by the veteran MP," while the New Zealand Herald understood the altercation to be "with a young staff member who had worked there for less than a year prior to the incident." On 1 June, Stuff reported that the complaint that led to the inquiry had been made by a second staffer who overheard the alleged altercation and that this staffer had made an audio recording. Smith is seeking access to this recording, which has delayed the conclusion of the inquiry. Former staffers claimed that Smith's behaviour was well known to everyone in parliament, including all National Party leaders as far back as Jim Bolger. A former MP said that Smith had a "volatile personality" and was frequently "outright rude to officials and staffers." Newsroom later reported that the Parliamentary Service investigation had widened its scope from the July 2020 incident to look at Smith's treatment of his staff throughout his time in politics and that Smith believed that the resulting report would be "devastating for both him and his career."

The media story containing the full details of the incident anticipated by Smith's statement did not appear on 1 June, but the next day Richard Harman of Politik published an article alleging that National leader Judith Collins had been the one to tell Smith that the inquiry had been leaked to the media and would shortly be revealed to the public, and hence "It appears either by accident or intent that Collins forced Smith's resignation because of her claims of the imminent publication of the story." Harman reported that Collins had told her caucus in early May 2021 that a scandal involving one of them would soon break, without naming the MP in question. He further suggested that Collins was likely to have known of the incident since it occurred in July 2020, and noted that Smith's presumptive replacement in Parliament, Harete Hipango, had told the Whanganui Chronicle that experienced political figures had briefed her that it was only a matter of time before she returned. Collins refused to confirm or deny having told Smith of the supposed leak, on the grounds that she did not discuss conversations that she had had with her MPs. She did acknowledge having learned of the alleged altercation in late 2020, and also questioned the legality of the recording of it. Newshub reported that Smith had been under the impression that its political editor Tova O'Brien was the reporter about to break the story, but that in fact, no such story existed.

Smith gave his valedictory speech on the afternoon of 10 June 2021, and his resignation from Parliament took effect at midnight that night.

In December 2021, Stuff and Newsroom obtained access to the draft version of the report on Smith's behaviour and described its contents, with responses from Smith and the allegedly bullied staffer.

== Mayor of Nelson ==
On 8 October 2022, Nick Smith was elected as Mayor of Nelson during the 2022 New Zealand local elections, succeeding the outgoing incumbent Mayor Rachel Reese. Smith defeated second highest polling candidate Matt Lawrey by a margin of 9,302 votes. During the mayoral race, Smith campaigned against the Government's Three Waters reform programme. Following his election as Mayor, Smith stated that the Nelson City Council would focus on recovering from the August 2022 storms that damaged the city, and boosting the local economy.

In early April 2024, Smith opposed calls to ban alcohol advertising at sports games, telling AM "that the economic benefits for the region outweigh the "minor issue" of concerns about social harm."

In early May 2024, Smith stated that he had been reassured by Crown agency Te Whatu Ora (Health New Zealand) that changes to the long-awaited rebuild of Nelson Hospital would address the shortage of beds and seismic issues at the facility.

After flash flooding affected several homes and businesses in Nelson on 26 May 2025, Smith renew calls for a rain radar to be installed in the Nelson-Marlborough region to give the city more warnings about serious storms. In response, the Metservice said that a new Nelson radar would cost NZ$3 million and require a funding bid through the New Zealand Crown's budgetary process.

Smith was re-elected as mayor in October 2025.

== Political views ==
In 2003 Smith voted against the Death with Dignity Bill, a bill aiming to legalise euthanasia in New Zealand.

In 2004 Smith voted against the Civil Union Act 2004 and the Relationships (Statutory References) Act. Smith also voted for the Marriage (Gender Clarification) Amendment Bill, which would have amended the Marriage Act to define marriage as only between a man and woman.

In 2012 Smith voted against the Marriage (Definition of Marriage) Amendment Bill, a bill allowing same-sex couples to marry in New Zealand. In his valedictory speech in 2021 he said that this vote was "an issue I got wrong," a change of view that he credited in part to family circumstances, and he apologised "to New Zealand's LGBT+ community."

In 2018, Smith vocalised support for human and civil rights as enshrined in the Bill of Rights 1689, during a debate on the Electoral (Integrity) Amendment Bill.

New Zealand Parliament
Preceded by Ken Shirley	Member of Parliament for Tasman; 1990–1996	Constituency abolished
Preceded by John Blincoe	Member of Parliament for Nelson; 1996–2020	Succeeded by Rachel Boyack
Party political offices
Preceded by Roger Sowry	Deputy Leader of the National Party; 2003	Succeeded by Gerry Brownlee
Political offices
Preceded by Simon Upton	Minister of Conservation; 1996–1999	Succeeded by Sandra Lee
Preceded by Paul East	Minister of Corrections; 1997–1999	Succeeded by Clem Simich
Preceded by Wyatt Creech	Minister of Education; 1999	Succeeded by Trevor Mallard
Preceded by Trevor Mallard	Minister for the Environment; 2008–2012	Succeeded by Amy Adams
Preceded by Maryan Street	Minister for ACC; 2008–2011	Succeeded by Judith Collins
Preceded by Rodney Hide	Minister of Local Government; 2011–2012	Succeeded by David Carter
Preceded by Kate Wilkinson	Minister of Conservation; 2013–2014	Succeeded by Maggie Barry
Preceded by Phil Heatley	Minister of Housing; 2013–2014	Office abolished
Preceded by Amy Adams	Minister for the Environment; 2014–2017	Succeeded by David Parker
Honorary titles
Preceded by Bill English	Father of the House; 2018–2021	Succeeded by Trevor Mallard
