= Rachel Boyack =

New Zealand politician

Rachel Boyack MP
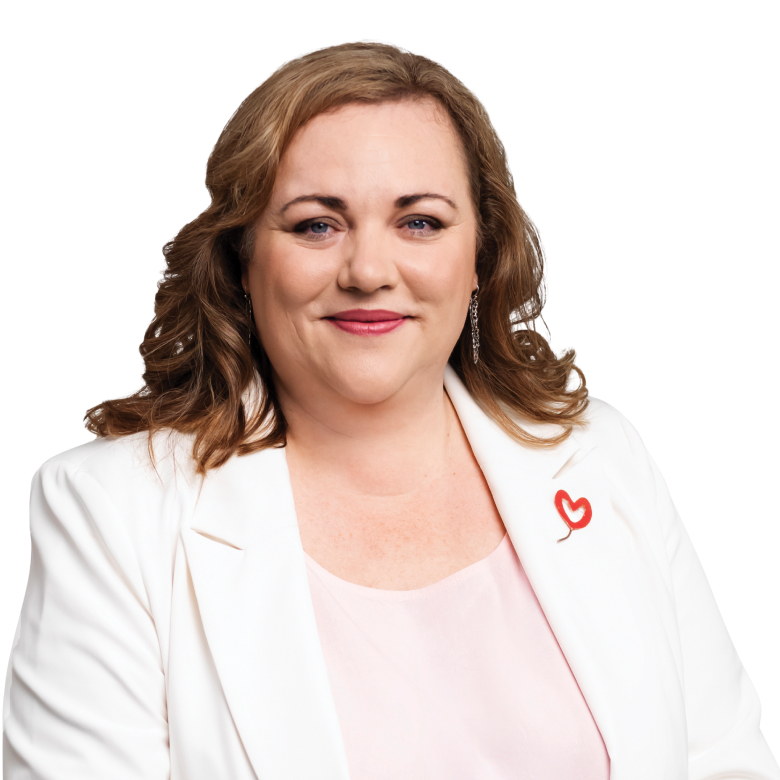
- Boyack in 2023

Member of the New Zealand Parliament for Nelson
- In office 17 October 2020 – 7 November 2026
- Preceded by: Nick Smith
- Succeeded by: Blair Cameron

Personal details
- Born: 1979 or 1980 (age 45–46) Timaru, New Zealand
- Party: Labour

Rachel Elizabeth Boyack-Mayer is a New Zealand unionist and politician. She served as member of parliament (MP) for Nelson from 2020 to 2026, representing the Labour Party.

== Early life and career ==
Boyack was born in Timaru and grew up in Palmerston North, having moved there aged nine. She attended Ross Intermediate with future MPs Tangi Utikere and Tim Costley and went on to Palmerston North Girls' High School. Her father, Jonathan Boyack, was a public health administrator who worked as an area health board chief executive and later moved to Birmingham where he was a hospital trust chief executive. Her parents separated in the 1990s and she was raised by her mother, a church organist. Her maternal grandfather, Alan Earl, was considered for the National Party candidacy in Wairarapa but was reportedly passed over due to his opposition to the 1981 Springbok rugby union tour.

Boyack earned a Bachelor of Music degree from the University of Auckland and was a member of the New Zealand Youth Choir. She married Scott Mayer, an accountant, and the couple moved to Nelson, where Boyack was assistant director of music at Christ Church Cathedral.

For three years, Boyack was the student union president for Saniti, the student union for Nelson Marlborough Institute of Technology. Following that, from about 2012 onward, she was the Nelson organiser of First Union. Her activities included protesting low wages at supermarkets, clashing with the mayor of Nelson, Rachel Reese, and opposing the closure of a bank's branch in Stoke. In 2018 she was appointed to the board of governors of the Nelson Environment Centre and was also on the board of the Nelson Women's and Children's Refuge.

== Political career ==
New Zealand Parliament
Years	Term	Electorate	List	Party
2020–2023	53rd	Nelson	57	Labour
2023–2026	54th	Nelson	42	Labour

=== Labour party activism ===
Boyack has been a member of the Labour Party since 2005. She was selected as its candidate for the Nelson electorate in January 2017, having expressed an interest in doing so in 2015. The Nelson electorate had been held by National Party MP Nick Smith since 1996. She was also placed on the Labour party list at 48th place. She finished runner-up, but lowered Smith's majority by 3000 votes.

=== First term, 2020–2023 ===
She was selected to stand in Nelson for Labour again in 2020. In the 2020 general election, she was elected to the Nelson seat by a final margin of 4,525 votes, ousting the incumbent Smith.

In her first term as a Member of Parliament, Boyack served as deputy chair of the governance and administration committee and deputy chair of the petitions committee. She sang a hymn at the conclusion of her maiden statement on 10 February 2021. Her private member's bill, the Plain Language Bill, was debated a first time in October 2021. The bill proposed requiring public agencies to appoint plain language officers in a bid to make public facing government documentation more comprehensible. The bill was opposed by the opposition National Party, who attempted a filibuster, but passed into law in October 2022. Boyack also oversaw the passage of a private bill modernising the governance arrangements of the Cawthron Institute.

=== Second term, 2023–present ===
Official results for the 2023 New Zealand general election, as of 3 November 2023, showed Boyack retaining the Nelson seat by 29 votes over National's candidate Blair Cameron. On 8 November, the National Party sought a judicial recount in the Nelson electorate. On 10 November, the Electoral Commission confirmed that Boyack had won Nelson by a margin of 26 votes, three votes fewer than the final vote results.

In late November 2023, Boyack became spokesperson for the Accident Compensation Corporation (ACC), arts, culture and heritage, and animal welfare in the Shadow Cabinet of Chris Hipkins.

In early March 2025, Boyack gained the oceans and fisheries portfolio during a shadow cabinet reshuffle. She retained the arts, culture and heritage and animal welfare portfolios but lost the ACC portfolio.

During the 2026 New Zealand general election, Boyack contested the Nelson electorate for Labour. She was ranked 36th on the Labour Party list. In the election she was defeated by Blair Cameron by a margin of 1,210 votes based on preliminary results. Due to her lower ranking, Boyack did not return to Parliament on the Labour Party list.

New Zealand Parliament
Preceded by Nick Smith	Member of Parliament for Nelson; 2020–present	Incumbent
