= Nelson, New Zealand =

City in the South Island, New Zealand

Nelson Whakatū (Māori)
- City and unitary region
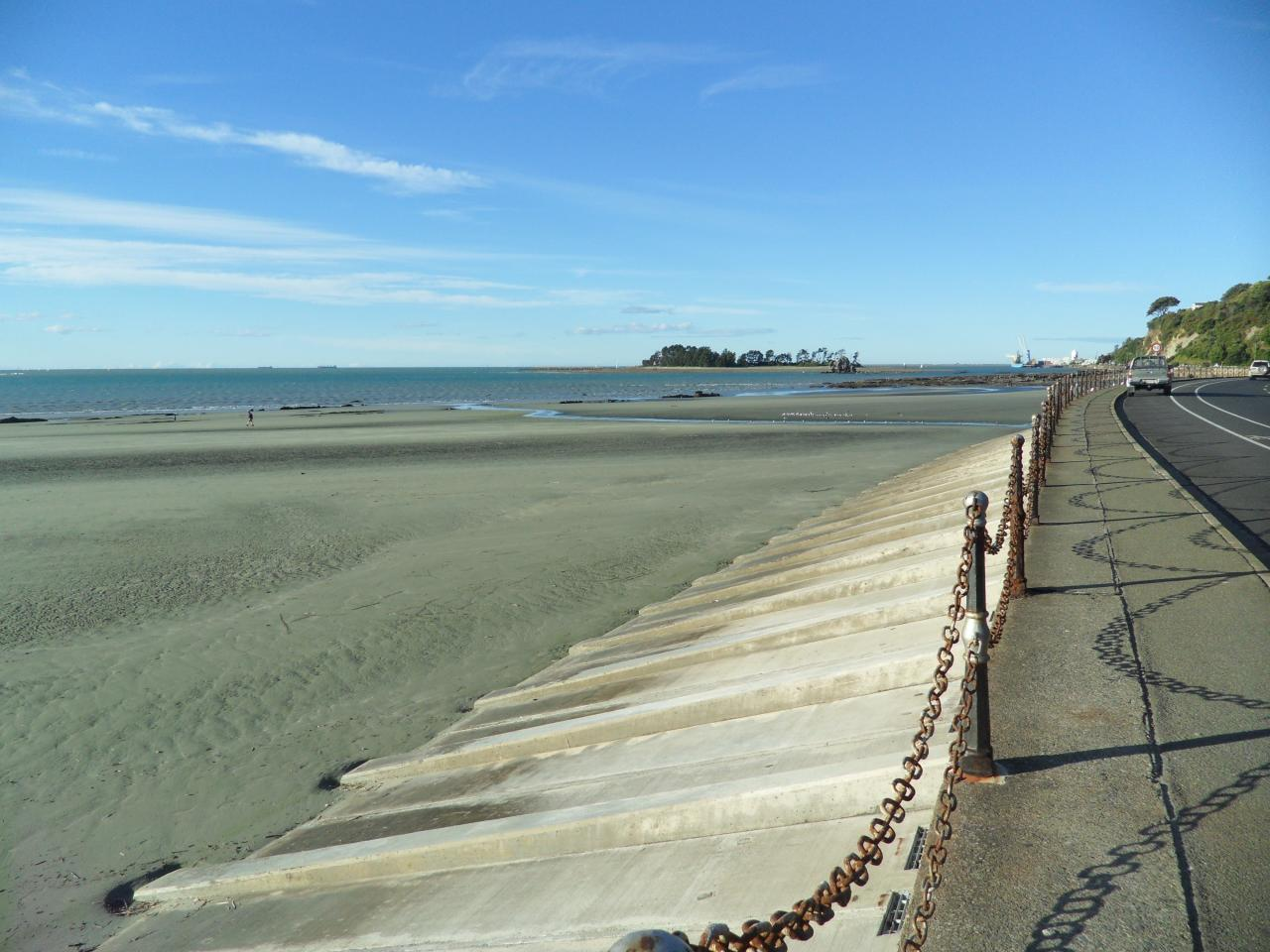
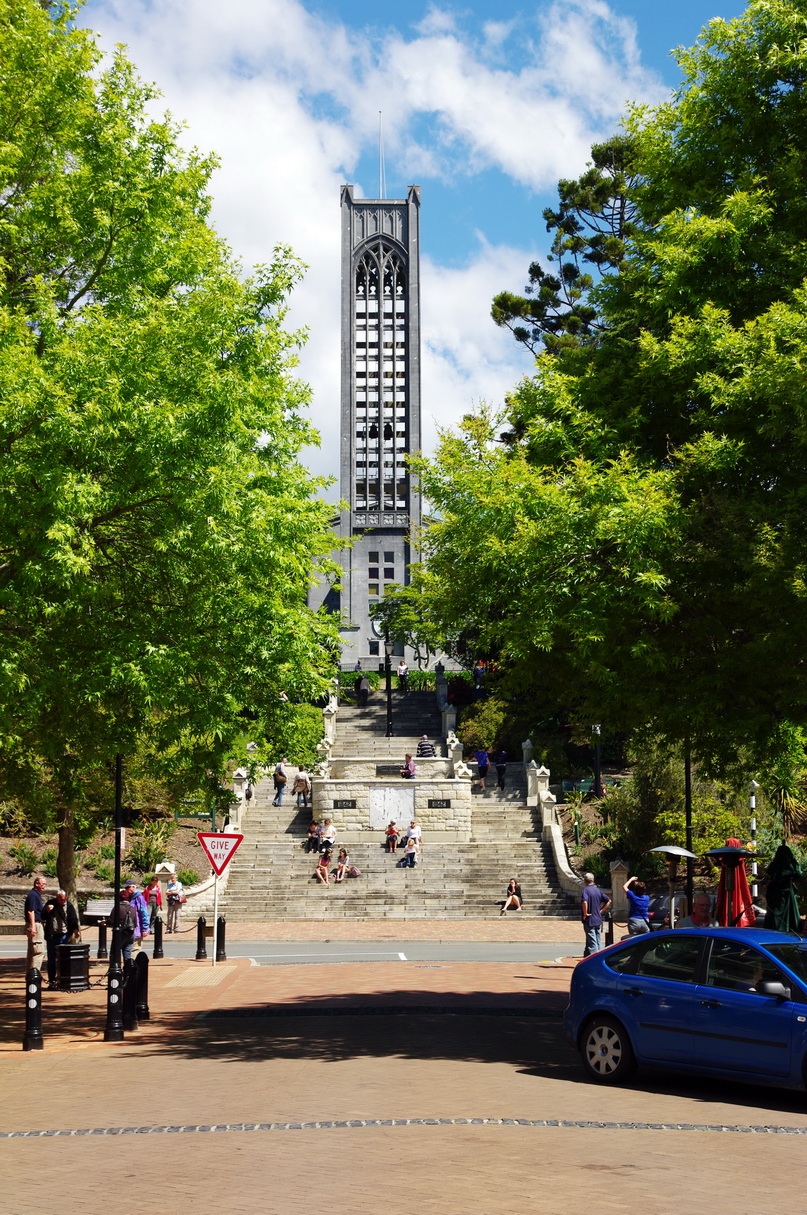
- Suter Art Gallery Tāhunanui Beach Christ Church Cathedral Trafalgar Street

- Flag Coat of arms
- Nickname: Sunny Nelson
- Motto: Latin: Palmam qui meruit ferat (Let him who has earned it bear the palm)
- Nelson region within New Zealand
- Coordinates: 41°16′15″S 173°17′2″E
- Country: New Zealand
- Island: South Island
- Unitary authority: Nelson City
- Settled by Europeans: 1841
- Founder: Arthur Wakefield
- Named for: Horatio Nelson
- Electorates: Nelson; Te Tai Tonga
- Suburbs: List: Nelson Central; Annesbrook; Atawhai; Beachville; Bishopdale; Britannia Heights; Enner Glynn; Maitai; Marybank; Moana; Monaco; Stepneyville; Stoke; Tāhunanui; The Brook; The Wood; Toi Toi; Wakatu; Washington Valley

Government
  - Body: Nelson City Council
  - Mayor: Nick Smith
  - Deputy mayor: Pete Rainey
  - MPs: Rachel Boyack (Labour); Tākuta Ferris (Te Pāti Māori)

Area
  - Territorial: 422.19 km^{2} (163.01 sq mi)
  - Urban: 54.69 km^{2} (21.12 sq mi)

Population (June 2025)
  - Territorial: 54,300
  - Density: 129/km^{2} (333/sq mi)
  - Urban: 50,800
  - Urban density: 929/km^{2} (2,410/sq mi)
- Time zone: UTC+12 (NZST)
  - Summer (DST): UTC+13 (NZDT)
- Postcode: 7010, 7011, 7020
- Area code: 03
- HDI (2023): 0.931 very high · 7th

Nelson (Māori: Whakatū) is a city and unitary authority on the eastern shores of the Tasman Bay at the top of the South Island of New Zealand. It is the oldest city in the South Island and the second-oldest settled city in the country; it was established in 1841 and became a city by British royal charter in 1858.

Nelson City is bordered to the west and south-west by the Tasman District and to the north-east, east and south-east by the Marlborough District. The Nelson urban area has a population of 50,800, making it New Zealand's 15th most populous urban area.

Nelson is well known for its thriving local arts and crafts scene; each year, the city hosts events popular with locals and tourists alike, such as the Nelson Arts Festival.

== Naming ==
Nelson was named in honour of Admiral Horatio Nelson, who defeated both the French and Spanish fleets at the Battle of Trafalgar in October 1805. Many roads and public areas around the city are named after people and ships associated with that battle. Inhabitants of the city are referred to as "Nelsonians". Trafalgar Street is its main shopping axis.

Nelson's Māori name, Whakatū, means 'construct', 'raise', or 'establish'.

In an article to The Colonist newspaper on 16 July 1867, Francis Stevens described Nelson as "The Naples of the Southern Hemisphere". Today, Nelson is nicknamed "Sunny Nelson" due to its high sunshine hours per year and the "Top of the South" because of its geographic location.

In New Zealand Sign Language, the name is signed by putting the index and middle fingers together, which are raised to the nose until the fingertips touch the nose, then move the hand forward so that the fingers point slightly forward away from oneself.

== History ==
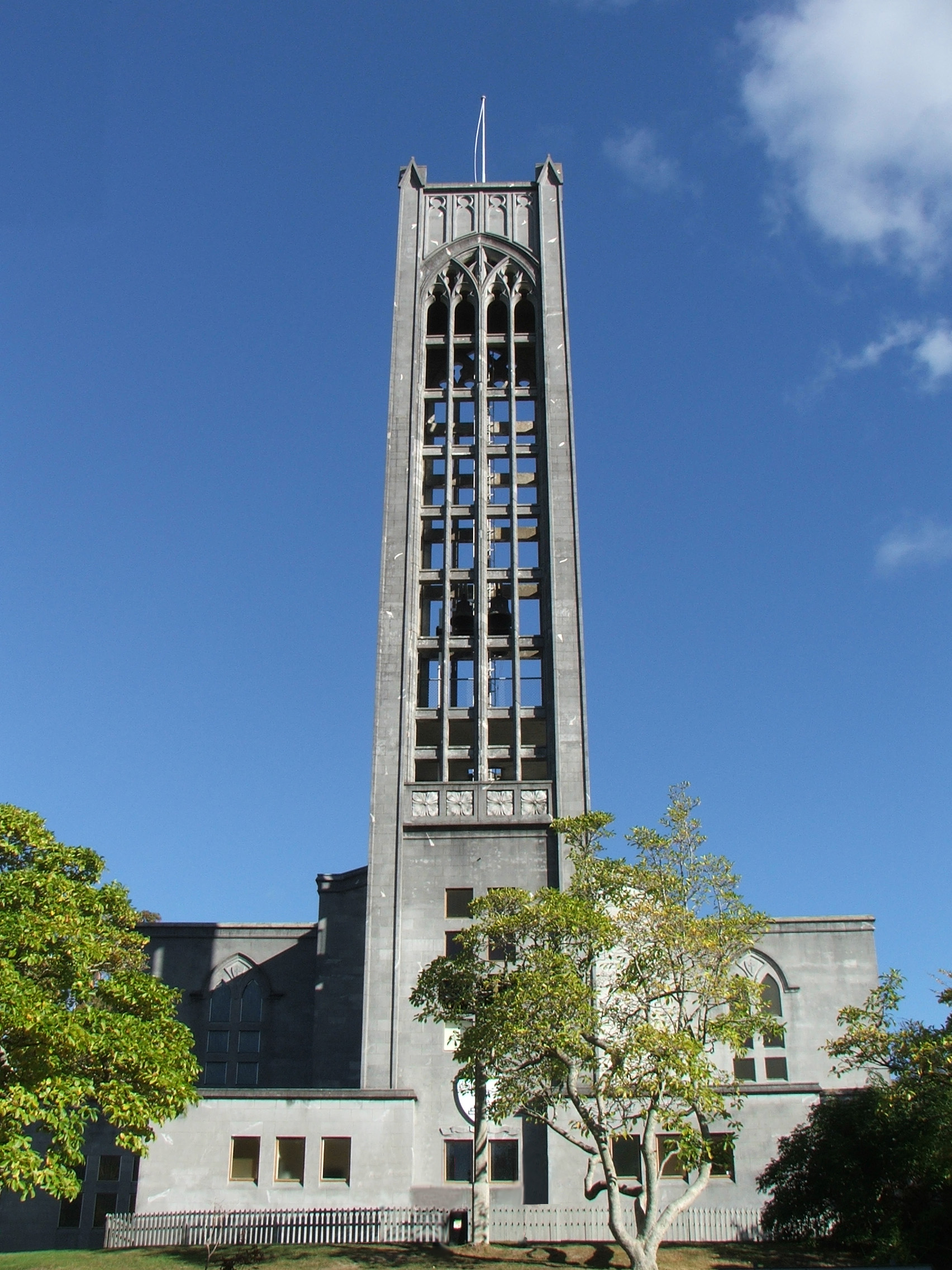
Diocese of Nelson Christ Church Cathedral on Church Hill, central Nelson

=== Māori settlement ===
Settlement of Nelson began about 700 years ago by Māori. There is evidence that the earliest settlements in New Zealand were around the Nelson–Marlborough regions. Some of the earliest recorded iwi in the Nelson district are Ngāti Hāwea, Ngāti Wairangi, Waitaha and Kāti Māmoe. Waitaha people developed the land around the Waimea Gardens, are believed to have been the first people to quarry argillite in around Nelson. They also developed much of the Waimea Gardens complex – more than 400 hectares (990 acres) on the Waimea Plains near Nelson. In the early 1600s, Ngāti Tūmatakōkiri displaced other te Tau Ihu Māori, becoming the dominant tribe in the area until the early 1800s. Raids from northern tribes in the 1820s, led by Te Rauparaha and his Ngāti Toa, soon decimated the local population and quickly displaced them.

Today, there are eight mutually recognised tribes of the northwestern region: Ngāti Kuia, Ngāti Apa ki te Rā Tō, Rangitāne, Ngāti Toarangatira, Ngāti Koata, Ngāti Rārua, Ngāti Tama and Te Atiawa o Te Waka-a-Māui.

=== New Zealand Company and European settlement ===
==== Planning ====
The New Zealand Company in London planned the settlement of Nelson. They intended to buy from the Māori some 200,000 acres (810 km^{2}) of land, which they planned to divide into one thousand lots and sell to intending settlers. The company earmarked profits to finance the free passage of artisans and labourers, with their families, and for the construction of public works. However, by September 1841 only about one third of the lots had sold. Despite this, the colony pushed ahead, and land was surveyed by Frederick Tuckett.

Three ships, the Arrow, Whitby, and Will Watch, sailed from London, the expedition commanded by Captain Arthur Wakefield. Arriving in New Zealand, they discovered that the new Governor of the colony, William Hobson, would not give them a free hand to secure vast areas of land from the Māori or indeed to decide where to site the colony. However, after some delay, Hobson allowed the company to investigate the Tasman Bay area at the north end of the South Island. The Company selected the site now occupied by Nelson City because it had the best harbour in the area. But it had a major drawback: it lacked suitable arable land; Nelson City stands right on the edge of a mountain range while the nearby Waimea Plains amount to only about 60,000 acres (240 km^{2}), less than one third of the area required by the Company plans.

The Company secured land, which was not clearly defined, from the Māori for £800: it included Nelson, Waimea, Motueka, Riwaka and Whakapuaka. This allowed the settlement to begin, but the lack of definition would prove the source of much future conflict. The three colony ships sailed into Nelson Haven during the first week of November 1841. When the first four immigrant ships – Fifeshire, Mary-Ann, Lord Auckland and Lloyds – arrived three months later, they found the town already laid out with streets, some wooden houses, tents and rough sheds. The town was laid out on a grid plan. Within 18 months, the company had sent out 18 ships with 1,052 men, 872 women and 1,384 children. However, fewer than ninety of the settlers had the capital to start as landowners.

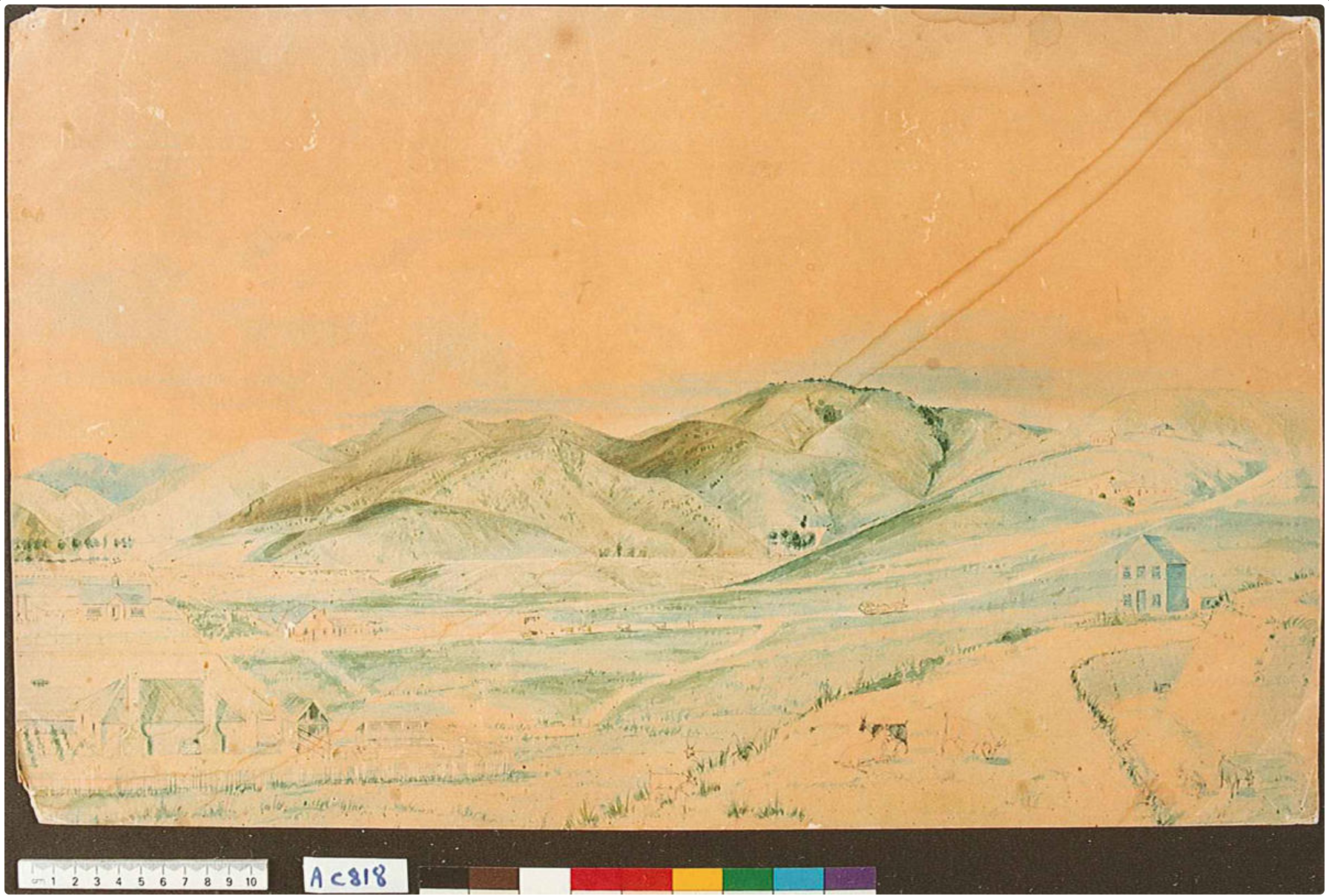
1845 Nelson from Church Hill looking east

==== Cultural and religious immigrants ====
The early settlement of Nelson province included a proportion of German immigrants, who arrived on the ship Sankt Pauli and formed the nucleus of the villages of Sarau (Upper Moutere) and Neudorf. These were mostly Lutheran Protestants with a small number of Bavarian Catholics.

In 1892, the New Zealand Church Missionary Society (NZCMS) was formed in a Nelson church hall.

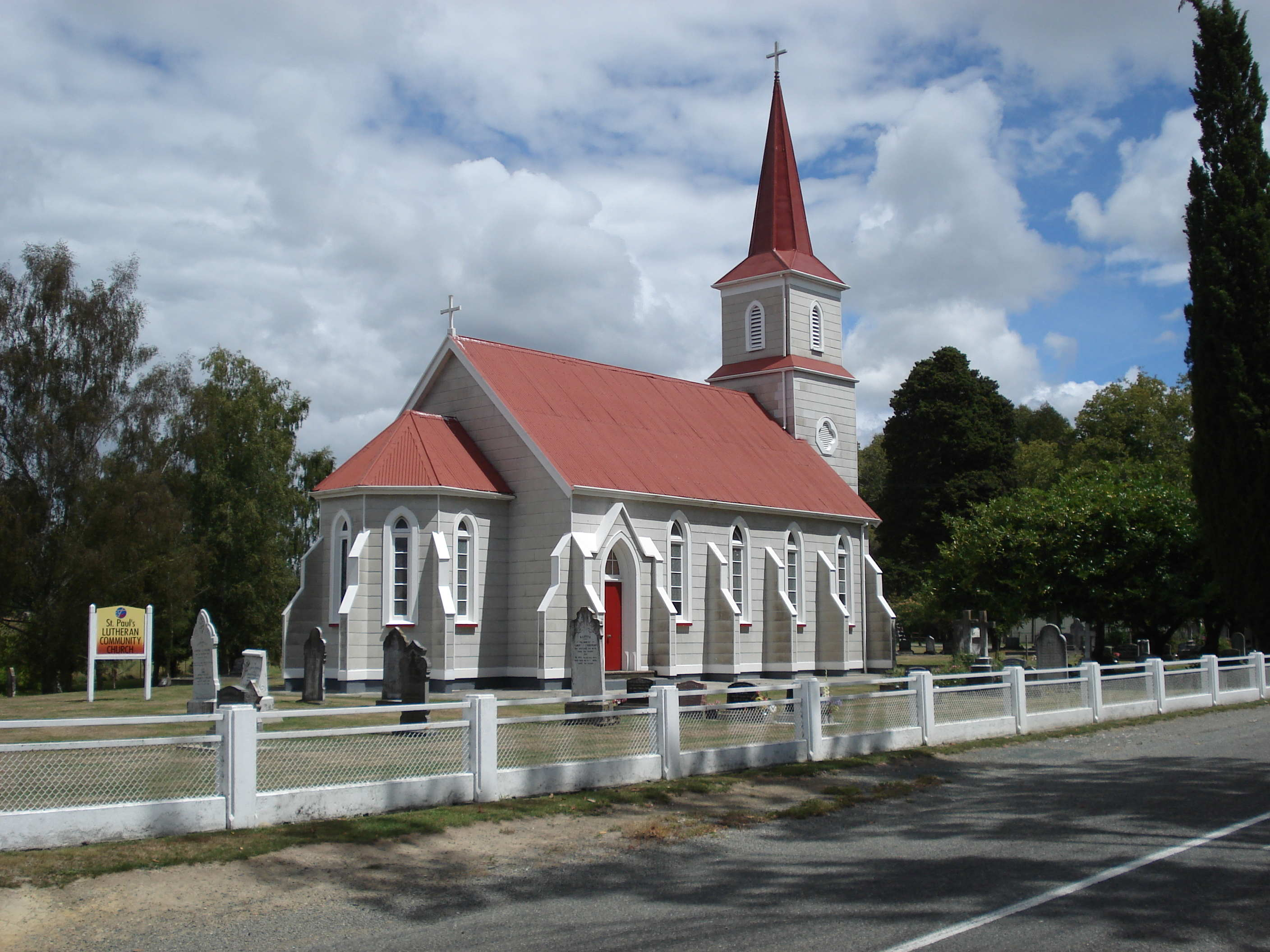
St Paul's Lutheran Church, Upper Moutere

==== Problems with land ====
After a brief initial period of prosperity, the lack of land and of capital caught up with the settlement and it entered a prolonged period of relative depression. The labourers had to accept a cut in their wages. Organised immigration ceased (a state of affairs that continued until the 1850s). By the end of 1843, the artisans and labourers began leaving Nelson; by 1846, some 25% of the immigrants had moved away.

The pressure to find more arable land became intense. To the south-east of Nelson lay the wide and fertile plains of the Wairau Valley, to which the New Zealand Company tried to claim that they had purchased the land. The Māori owners stated adamantly that the Wairau Valley had not formed part of the original land sale, and made it clear they would resist any attempts by the settlers to occupy the area. The Nelson settlers led by Arthur Wakefield and Henry Thompson attempted to do just that. This resulted in the Wairau Affray, where 22 settlers and 4 Māori died. The subsequent Government inquiry exonerated the Māori and found that the Nelson settlers had no legitimate claim to any land outside Tasman Bay. Public fears of a Māori attack on Nelson led to the formation of the Nelson Battalion of Militia in 1845.

=== City status ===
Nelson township was managed by the Nelson Provincial Council through a Board of Works constituted by the Provincial Government under the Nelson Improvement Act 1856 until 1874. It was proclaimed a Bishop's See and city under letters patent by Queen Victoria on 27 September 1858, the second New Zealand city proclaimed in this manner after Christchurch. Nelson only had some 5,000 residents at this time. Edmund Hobhouse was the first Bishop. The Municipal Corporations Act 1876 stated that Nelson was constituted a city on 30 March 1874.

=== Nelson Province ===
The Nelson Province as constituted in 1853

From 1853 until 1876, when provincial governments were abolished, Nelson was the capital of Nelson Province. The province itself was much larger than present-day Nelson City and included all of the present-day Buller, Kaikōura, Marlborough, Nelson, and Tasman, as well as the Grey District north of the Grey River and the Hurunui District north of the Hurunui River. The Marlborough Province split from Nelson Province in October 1859.

==== Provincial anniversary ====
Nelson Anniversary Day is a public holiday observed in the northern half of the South Island of New Zealand, being the area's provincial anniversary day. It is observed throughout the historic Nelson Province, even though the provinces of New Zealand were abolished in 1876. The modern area of observation includes all of Nelson City and includes all of the present-day Buller, Kaikōura, Marlborough, Tasman districts as well as the Grey District north of the Grey River / Māwheranui and the Hurunui District north of the Hurunui River. The holiday usually falls on the Monday closest to 1 February, the anniversary of the arrival of the first New Zealand Company boat, the Fifeshire, on 1 February 1842.

Anniversary celebrations in the early years featured a sailing regatta, horse racing, running races, shooting and ploughing matches. In 1892, the Nelson Jubilee Celebration featured an official week-long programme with church services, sports, concerts, a ball and a grand display of fireworks.

==== Time gun ====
In 1858, the Nelson Provincial Council erected a time gun at the spot on Brittania Heights where Captain Wakefield erected his flagpole in 1841. The gun was fired each Saturday at noon to give the correct time. The gun is now preserved as a historical relic and the Songer Tree marks the site on Signal Hill of the original flagpole.

== Geography ==
The Nelson-Tasman area comprises two unitary authorities – Nelson City, administered by the Nelson City Council, and Tasman District, administered by the Tasman District Council, based in Richmond 15 kilometres (9 miles) to the southwest. It is between Marlborough, another unitary authority, to the east, and the West Coast Regional Council to the west. The Nelson City territorial authority area is small, at only 422 km^{2} (163 sq mi).

For at least two decades, there has been talk about amalgamating Nelson City and the Tasman District to streamline and render more financially economical the existing co-operation between the two councils, exemplified by the jointly owned Port Nelson and the jointly funded Nelson Regional Development Agency. However, an official poll conducted in April 2012 showed nearly three-quarters of those who voted in Tasman were opposed to the proposal, while a majority of Nelson voters were in favour.

Nelson has beaches and a sheltered harbour. The harbour entrance is protected by a Boulder Bank, a natural, 13 km (8 miles) bank of rocks transported south from Mackay Bluff via longshore drift. The bank creates a perfect natural harbour which enticed the first settlers, although the entrance was narrow. The wreck of the Fifeshire on Arrow Rock (now called Fifeshire Rock in memory of this disaster) in 1842 proved the difficulty of the passage. A cut was later made in the bank in 1906 which allowed larger vessels access to the port.

The creation of Rocks Road around the waterfront area after the Tāhunanui slump in 1892 increased the effects of the tide on Nelson city's beach, Tāhunanui, and removed sediment. This meant the popular beach and adjoining car park were being eroded (plus the sand dunes) so a project to replace these sands was put in place and has so far proved a success, with the sand rising a considerable amount and the dunes continuing to grow.

=== Waterways ===
The Nelson territorial authority area has four main waterways, the Whangamoa, Wakapuaka, Maitai and Roding Rivers. The Roding River, the southernmost in Nelson, rises in the hills between Mount Meares and Dun Mountain. From there it flows westward before entering the Tasman District where it eventually joins the Waimea River, which flows into Waimea Inlet near Moturoa / Rabbit Island. The Maitai River flows westward from the Dun Mountain area into the town centre of Nelson before entering the Nelson Haven then Tasman Bay via 'The Cut'. Major tributaries of the Maitai River are: York and Brook Streams plus Sharland, Packer, Groom, Glen, Neds, Sclanders, Beauchamp and Mill Creeks. The Wakapuaka River, which flows north from the Saddle Hill area to its mouth at Cable Bay in North Nelson, has two main tributaries, the Lud and Teal Rivers. Entering Tasman Bay near Kokorua in the north of Nelson, the Whangamoa River is the longest waterway in Nelson. Smaller waterways in the south of Nelson include: Saxton Creek, Orchard Stream, Poorman Valley Stream, Arapiki Stream, Jenkins Creek and Maire Stream.

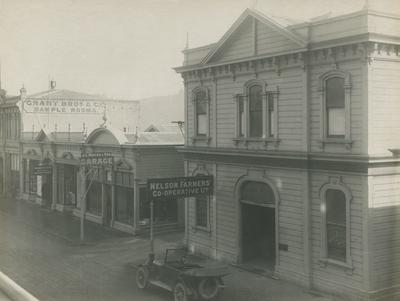
Hardy St in c.1920

=== Central city ===
The central city of Nelson, also referred to as the central business district (CBD), is bounded by Halifax Street to the north, Rutherford Street to the west, Collingwood Street to the east, and Selwyn Place to the south. Other major streets within the CBD include Trafalgar Street, Bridge Street and Hardy Street.

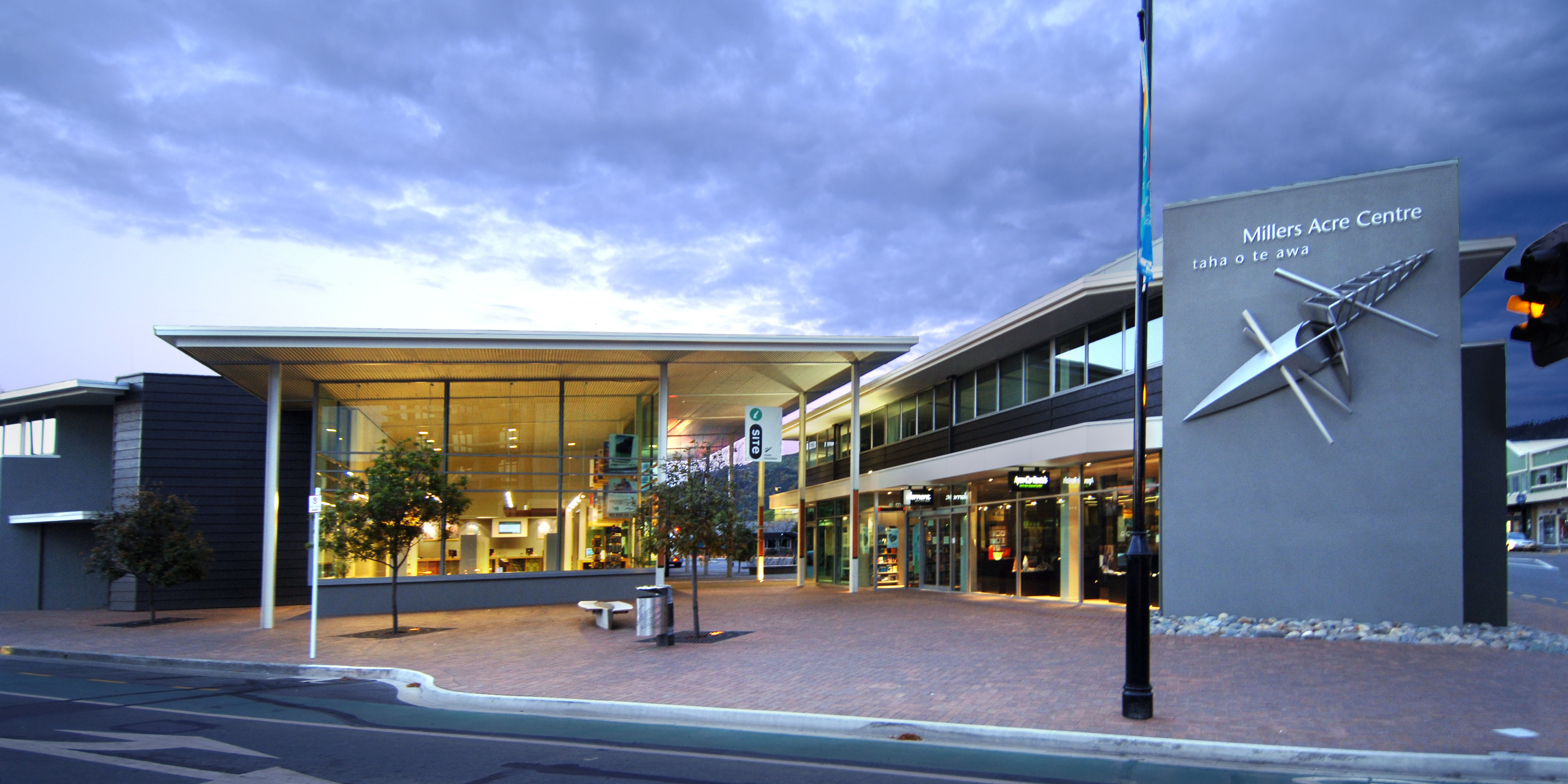
Nelson i-SITE at Millers Acre Centre

=== Suburbs and localities ===
There are 30 recognised suburbs and localities in Nelson City as of 2025.

==== Suburbs ====
- Atawhai
- Beachville
- Bishopdale
- Britannia Heights
- Enner Glynn
- Maitai
- Marybank
- Moana
- Monaco
- Nelson
- Nelson Haven
- Nelson South
- Port Nelson
- Stepneyville
- Stoke
- The Brook
- The Wood
- Toi Toi
- Tāhunanui
- Wakatu
- Washington Valley

==== Localities ====
- Cable Bay
- Delaware Bay
- Glenduan
- Hira
- Hira Forest
- Pepin Island
- Todds Valley
- Wakapuaka
- Whangamoa

The Nelson commuter belt extends to Richmond, Brightwater, Hope, Māpua and Wakefield in the Tasman District.

=== Climate ===
Nelson has a temperate oceanic climate (Cfb), with cool winters and warm summers. Nelson has rainfall evenly distributed throughout the year and has fewer frosts due to the highly marine geography of New Zealand. Winter is the stormiest time, where gales and storms are more common. Nelson has one of the sunniest climates of all major New Zealand centres, earning the nickname 'Sunny Nelson' with an annual average total of over 2400 hours of sunshine. The highest recorded temperature in Nelson is 36.3 °C (97 °F), the lowest −6.6 °C (20 °F).

Climate data for Nelson (1991–2020 normals, 1862–present)
Month	Jan	Feb	Mar	Apr	May	Jun	Jul	Aug	Sep	Oct	Nov	Dec	Year
Record high °C (°F)	33.3 (91.9)	36.3 (97.3)	29.4 (84.9)	26.9 (80.4)	22.9 (73.2)	20.0 (68.0)	19.5 (67.1)	21.1 (70.0)	24.3 (75.7)	26.9 (80.4)	28.9 (84.0)	31.1 (88.0)	36.3 (97.3)
Mean maximum °C (°F)	27.6 (81.7)	27.6 (81.7)	25.4 (77.7)	22.3 (72.1)	20.0 (68.0)	17.1 (62.8)	15.9 (60.6)	17.4 (63.3)	19.6 (67.3)	21.9 (71.4)	24.3 (75.7)	25.7 (78.3)	28.7 (83.7)
Mean daily maximum °C (°F)	22.5 (72.5)	22.7 (72.9)	21.2 (70.2)	18.4 (65.1)	16.0 (60.8)	13.4 (56.1)	12.7 (54.9)	13.6 (56.5)	15.2 (59.4)	17.2 (63.0)	19.0 (66.2)	20.9 (69.6)	17.7 (63.9)
Daily mean °C (°F)	18.1 (64.6)	18.2 (64.8)	16.4 (61.5)	13.7 (56.7)	11.2 (52.2)	8.5 (47.3)	7.6 (45.7)	8.8 (47.8)	10.7 (51.3)	12.7 (54.9)	14.5 (58.1)	16.7 (62.1)	13.1 (55.6)
Mean daily minimum °C (°F)	13.7 (56.7)	13.7 (56.7)	11.7 (53.1)	9.0 (48.2)	6.3 (43.3)	3.5 (38.3)	2.6 (36.7)	4.0 (39.2)	6.1 (43.0)	8.2 (46.8)	9.9 (49.8)	12.5 (54.5)	8.4 (47.1)
Mean minimum °C (°F)	8.2 (46.8)	8.6 (47.5)	6.1 (43.0)	3.3 (37.9)	0.5 (32.9)	−1.8 (28.8)	−2.2 (28.0)	−1.2 (29.8)	0.5 (32.9)	2.3 (36.1)	4.1 (39.4)	6.7 (44.1)	−2.6 (27.3)
Record low °C (°F)	2.8 (37.0)	2.8 (37.0)	−0.2 (31.6)	−2.8 (27.0)	−3.9 (25.0)	−6.6 (20.1)	−6.1 (21.0)	−5.8 (21.6)	−3.7 (25.3)	−1.7 (28.9)	−1.0 (30.2)	1.2 (34.2)	−6.6 (20.1)
Average rainfall mm (inches)	73.2 (2.88)	62.8 (2.47)	71.1 (2.80)	84.9 (3.34)	87.7 (3.45)	99.5 (3.92)	78.6 (3.09)	83.8 (3.30)	84.6 (3.33)	89.0 (3.50)	67.9 (2.67)	93.0 (3.66)	976.1 (38.41)
Average rainy days (≥ 1.0 mm)	6.8	5.3	6.1	7.3	7.4	8.7	7.7	9.2	9.8	8.9	7.5	8.6	93.3
Average relative humidity (%)	73.6	77.4	81.1	83.2	87.9	89.8	90.0	86.9	78.7	76.2	71.3	72.5	80.7
Mean monthly sunshine hours	264.6	238.8	230.8	191.9	176.0	145.4	159.6	183.9	192.5	228.3	242.6	242.7	2,497.1
Mean daily daylight hours	14.8	13.7	12.3	11.0	9.8	9.2	9.5	10.5	11.8	13.2	14.4	15.1	12.1
Percentage possible sunshine	58	62	61	58	58	53	54	56	54	56	56	52	57
Source 1: NIWA Climate Data
Source 2: Weather Spark

=== "Centre of New Zealand" monument ===
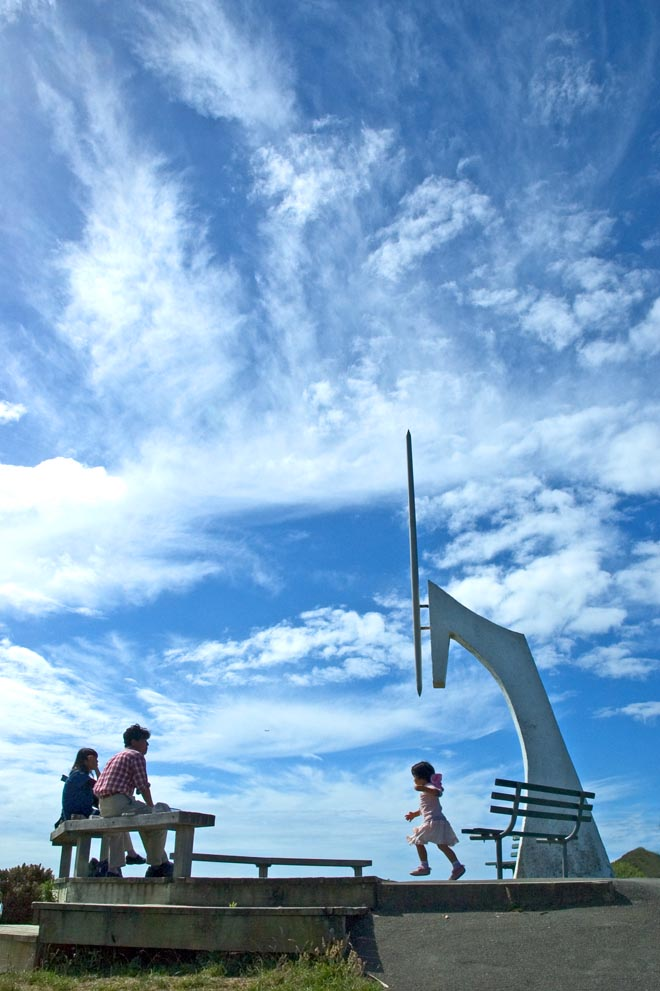
The marker at the "Centre of New Zealand"

Nelson has a monument on Botanical Hill, near the centre of the city. The walk to this is called the "Centre of New Zealand walk". Despite the name, this monument does not mark the actual geographic centre of New Zealand.

Instead, the monument marks the "zero, zero" point to which the first geodetic surveys of New Zealand were referenced. These surveys were started in the 1870s by John Spence Browning, the Chief Surveyor for Nelson. From this 360-degree viewpoint, survey marks in neighbouring regions (including Wellington in the North Island) could be triangulated and the local surveys connected.

In 1962, Ian Reilly from the now defunct Department of Scientific and Industrial Research calculated the geographic centre of New Zealand (including Stewart Island and some smaller islands in addition to the North and South Island, but excluding the Chathams) to be in a forest in Spooners Range 35 mi (56 kilometres) southwest of Nelson at 41°30′S 172°50′E.

Owing to the coarse nature of the underlying data (use of rectangular areas of 7.5 minutes of arc on each side), the centre calculated by Reilly has quite large error margins. Recalculating the result with more modern and accurate data shows the geographic centre of New Zealand is approximately 60 km southwest of Nelson, in the Big Bush Conservation Area north of Saint Arnaud, New Zealand.

== Demographics ==
Nelson covers 422.19 km^{2} (163.01 sq mi) and had an estimated population of 54,300 as of June 2025, with a population density of 129 people per km^{2}.

Historical population
Year	Pop.	±% p.a.
1991	36,459	—
1996	40,278	+2.01%
2001	41,568	+0.63%
2006	42,888	+0.63%
2013	46,437	+1.14%
2018	50,880	+1.84%
2023	52,584	+0.66%

Nelson City had a population of 52,584 in the 2023 New Zealand census, an increase of 1,704 people (3.3%) since the 2018 census, and an increase of 6,147 people (13.2%) since the 2013 census. There were 25,620 males, 26,712 females and 255 people of other genders in 20,967 dwellings. 3.6% of people identified as LGBTIQ+. The median age was 44.0 years (compared with 38.1 years nationally). There were 8,712 people (16.6%) aged under 15 years, 8,226 (15.6%) aged 15 to 29, 24,285 (46.2%) aged 30 to 64, and 11,361 (21.6%) aged 65 or older.

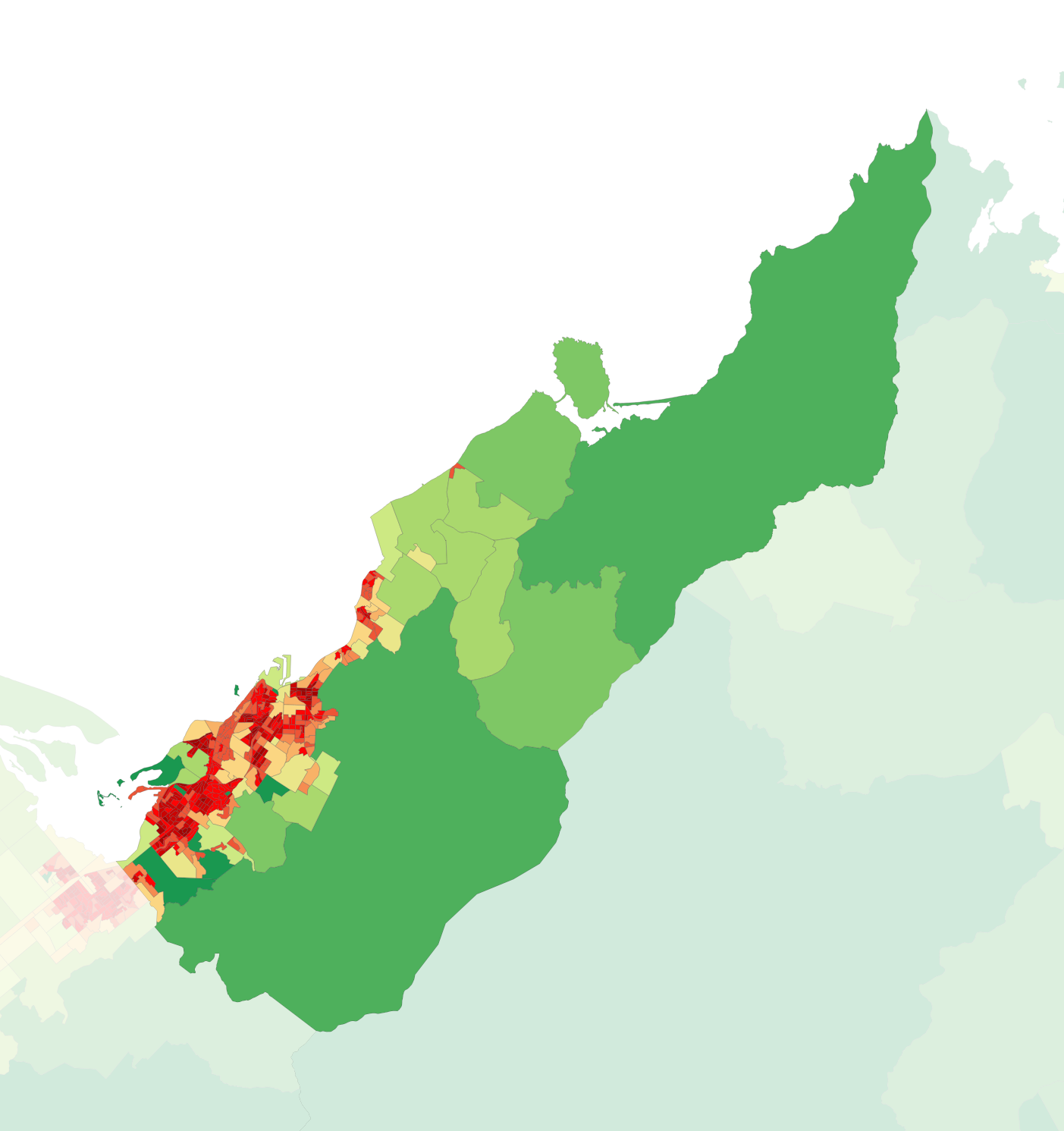
Population density in the 2023 census

People could identify as more than one ethnicity. The results were 84.7% European (Pākehā); 11.9% Māori; 2.8% Pasifika; 8.6% Asian; 1.4% Middle Eastern, Latin American and African New Zealanders (MELAA); and 2.7% other, which includes people giving their ethnicity as "New Zealander". English was spoken by 96.9%, Māori language by 2.9%, Samoan by 0.5% and other languages by 12.8%. No language could be spoken by 1.7% (e.g. too young to talk). New Zealand Sign Language was known by 0.6%. The percentage of people born overseas was 26.4, compared with 28.8% nationally.

Religious affiliations were 28.2% Christian, 1.1% Hindu, 0.5% Islam, 0.3% Māori religious beliefs, 1.2% Buddhist, 0.7% New Age, 0.1% Jewish, and 1.5% other religions. People who answered that they had no religion were 59.1%, and 7.5% of people did not answer the census question.

Of those at least 15 years old, 8,472 (19.3%) people had a bachelor's or higher degree, 22,197 (50.6%) had a post-high school certificate or diploma, and 10,218 (23.3%) people exclusively held high school qualifications. The median income was $38,800, compared with $41,500 nationally. 3,906 people (8.9%) earned over $100,000 compared to 12.1% nationally. The employment status of those at least 15 was that 20,679 (47.1%) people were employed full-time, 6,825 (15.6%) were part-time, and 969 (2.2%) were unemployed.

Individual wards
Name	Area (km^{2})	Population	Density (per km^{2})	Dwellings	Median age	Median income
Central General Ward	390.88	25,851	66	10,329	43.2 years	$39,300
Stoke-Tāhunanui General Ward	31.32	26,736	854	10,638	44.8 years	$38,200
New Zealand					38.1 years	$41,500

=== Urban area ===
Nelson's urban area covers 54.69 km^{2} (21.12 sq mi) and had an estimated population of 50,800 as of June 2025, with a population density of 929 people per km^{2}.

Historical population
Year	Pop.	±% p.a.
2013	44,271	—
2018	48,129	+1.69%
2023	49,224	+0.45%

The urban area had a population of 49,224 in the 2023 New Zealand census, an increase of 1,095 people (2.3%) since the 2018 census, and an increase of 4,953 people (11.2%) since the 2013 census. There were 23,997 males, 24,984 females and 243 people of other genders in 19,701 dwellings. 3.7% of people identified as LGBTIQ+. The median age was 43.5 years (compared with 38.1 years nationally). There were 8,181 people (16.6%) aged under 15 years, 7,830 (15.9%) aged 15 to 29, 22,782 (46.3%) aged 30 to 64, and 10,431 (21.2%) aged 65 or older.

People could identify as more than one ethnicity. The results were 84.1% European (Pākehā); 12.2% Māori; 2.9% Pasifika; 9.0% Asian; 1.4% Middle Eastern, Latin American and African New Zealanders (MELAA); and 2.7% other, which includes people giving their ethnicity as "New Zealander". English was spoken by 96.8%, Māori language by 3.0%, Samoan by 0.6% and other languages by 13.0%. No language could be spoken by 1.7% (e.g. too young to talk). New Zealand Sign Language was known by 0.6%. The percentage of people born overseas was 26.5, compared with 28.8% nationally.

Religious affiliations were 28.2% Christian, 1.1% Hindu, 0.5% Islam, 0.3% Māori religious beliefs, 1.2% Buddhist, 0.7% New Age, 0.1% Jewish, and 1.5% other religions. People who answered that they had no religion were 59.0%, and 7.5% of people did not answer the census question.

Of those at least 15 years old, 7,899 (19.2%) people had a bachelor's or higher degree, 20,718 (50.5%) had a post-high school certificate or diploma, and 9,657 (23.5%) people exclusively held high school qualifications. The median income was $38,900, compared with $41,500 nationally. 3,555 people (8.7%) earned over $100,000 compared to 12.1% nationally. The employment status of those at least 15 was that 19,488 (47.5%) people were employed full-time, 6,303 (15.4%) were part-time, and 933 (2.3%) were unemployed.

== Government ==
=== Local ===
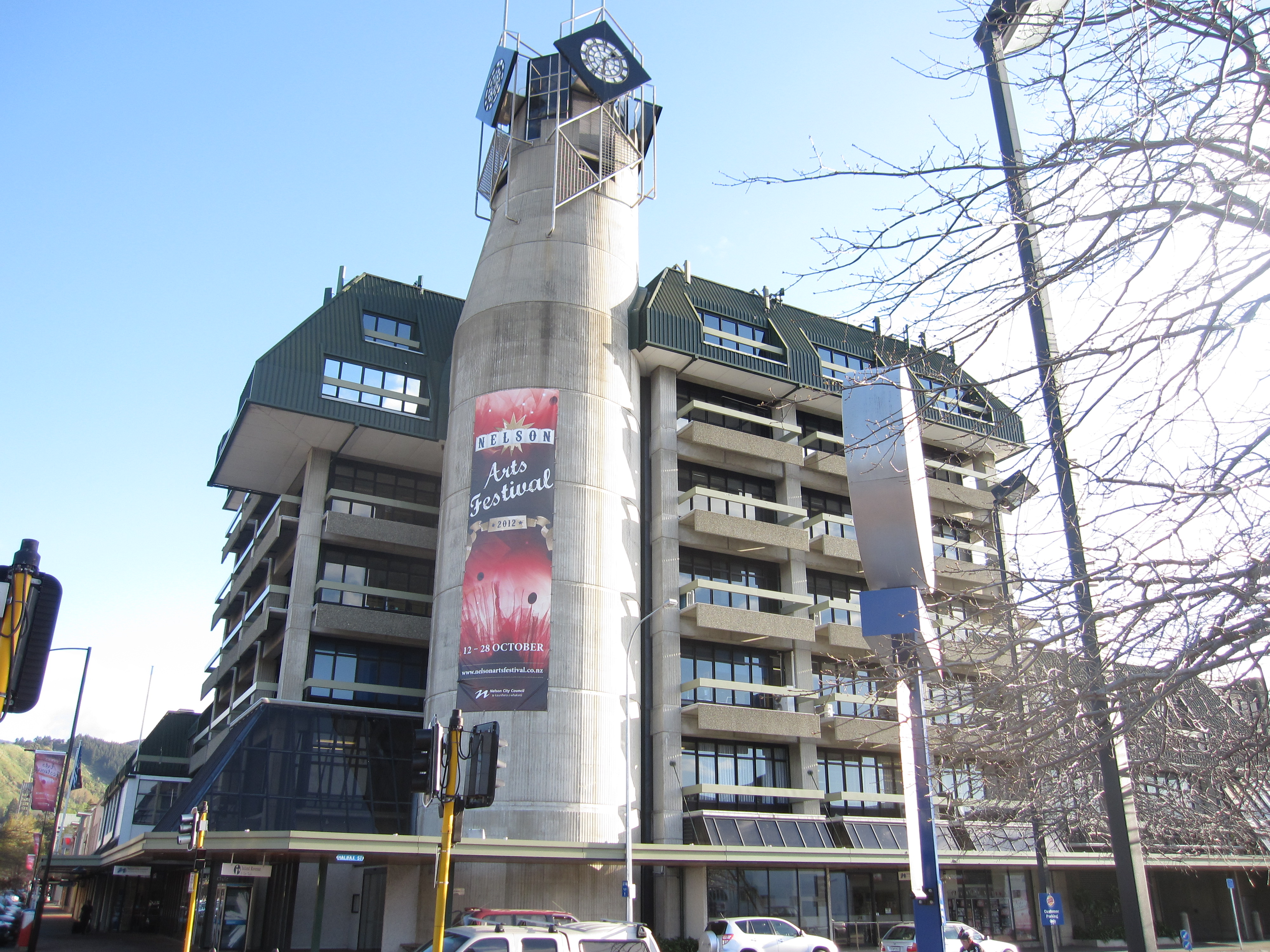
The Nelson City Council building in 2012

As a unitary authority, the Nelson City Council has the combined responsibilities and functions of both a territorial (local) and regional council. This is different from most other local authorities in New Zealand. More often, a regional council is a separate organisation with several territorial authorities (city or district councils) within its borders. Other unitary authorities are the Auckland Council, Gisborne District Council, Marlborough District Council, Tasman District Council and the Chatham Islands Council.

The Nelson City Council holds elections for the mayor of Nelson and 12 councillors under the STV electoral system every three years. As of 12 October 2025, the mayor is Nick Smith.

Nelson City has a coat of arms, obtained in 1958 from the College of Arms to mark the centenary of Nelson as a city. The blazon of the arms is:

"Barry wavy Argent and Azure a Cross Flory Sable on a Chief also Azure a Mitre proper And for the Crest on a Wreath of the Colours Issuant from a Mural Crown proper a Lion rampant Gules holding between the fore paws a Sun in splendour or. The supporters on the dexter side a Huia Bird and on the sinister side a Kotuku both proper."

Motto "Palmam qui meruit ferat" (Let him who has earned it bear the palm). This motto is the same as that of Lord Nelson.

=== National ===
Nelson is covered by the Nelson general electorate, and the Te Tai Tonga Māori electorate, which covers the entire South Island and part of Wellington in the North Island. Since the 2023 general election, Nelson is held by Rachel Boyack of the Labour Party, and Te Tai Tonga by Tākuta Ferris of Te Pāti Māori.

== Economy ==
The Nelson economy (and that of the neighbouring Tasman District) is based on the 'big five' industries; seafood, horticulture, forestry, farming and tourism. Port Nelson is the biggest fishing port in Australasia. There are also a range of growth industries, including art and craft, aviation, engineering technology, and information technology. The region was sixth in terms of GDP growth in the 2007–10 period.

The combined sub-national GDP of Nelson and Tasman District was estimated at $3.4 billion in 2010, 1.8% of New Zealand's national GDP.

The Nelson Regional Development Agency is an economic development agency for Nelson and the Tasman District.

Some of the region's largest companies and employers are:

- Helicopters (NZ) has its headquarters and maintenance base at Nelson Airport.
- Japanese automobile manufacturer Honda has its New Zealand distribution centre in the Whakatu Industrial Estate in Stoke.
- Beverage company McCashins has a microbrewery in Stoke.
- SeaDragon Marine Oils has a fish oil refinery in Annesbrook.
- The Cawthron Institute has a research facility in The Wood.
- Food manufacturer the Talley's Group has processing facilities at Port Nelson.
- New Zealand King Salmon processes Chinook salmon at its factory in Annesbrook.
- Pic's Peanut Butter is made in its Stoke factory.

Former regional airline Air Nelson had its headquarters and maintenance base at Nelson Airport.

In 2013, Nelson Mayor Aldo Miccio worked on a proposal that would see Australian call centres for companies such as Gen-i and Xero relocated to Nelson. The plan was in response to Australian companies moving call and contact centres out of Asia because their Australian customers preferred English-speaking centres. If the plan was successful, Miccio expected 100 to 300 jobs paying NZ$50,000-plus in the first year to be created in Nelson.

=== Tourism ===
Nelson is a gateway for tourists and visitors exploring the Abel Tasman, Kahurangi, and Nelson Lakes National Parks, and the Great Taste Trail, and popular walks such as the Abel Tasman Coast Track, and Heaphy Track.

It is a centre for both ecotourism and adventure tourism and has a high reputation among caving enthusiasts due to several prominent cave systems around Takaka Hill and the Wharepapa / Arthur Range, including the Nettlebed Cave and some of the largest and deepest explored caverns in the Southern Hemisphere.

== Culture and the arts ==
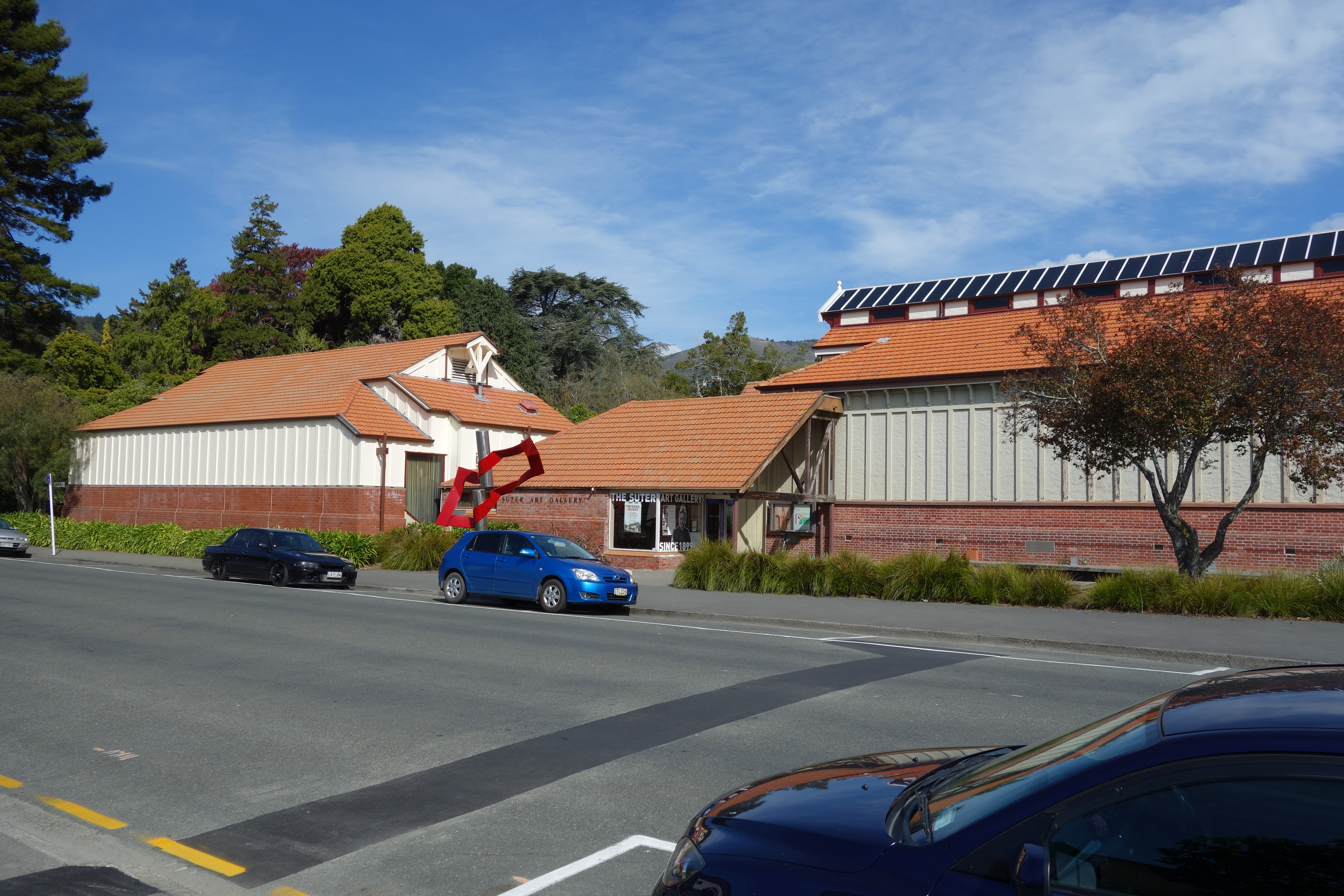
Suter Art Gallery, before its 2017 renovation

As the major regional centre, the city offers many lodgings, restaurants, and unique speciality shopping such as at the Jens Hansen Goldsmiths where "The One Ring" in The Lord of the Rings film trilogy was designed.

- Nelson has a vibrant local music and arts scene and is known nationwide for its culturally idiosyncratic craftsmen. These include potters, glass blowers, and dozens of wood carvers using native New Zealand southern beech and exotic Cupressus macrocarpa.
- Nelson is a popular visitor destination and year-round attracts both New Zealanders and international tourists.
- The Nelson Saturday Market is a popular weekly market where one can buy direct from local artists.
- The Theatre Royal was restored in 2010 and is the oldest wooden functioning theatre in the Southern Hemisphere (built 1878)
- Art organisations include the Suter Art Gallery and Nelson Arts Festival.
- The Victory Village community received the 2010 New Zealander of the Year award for Community of the Year.

=== Architecture ===
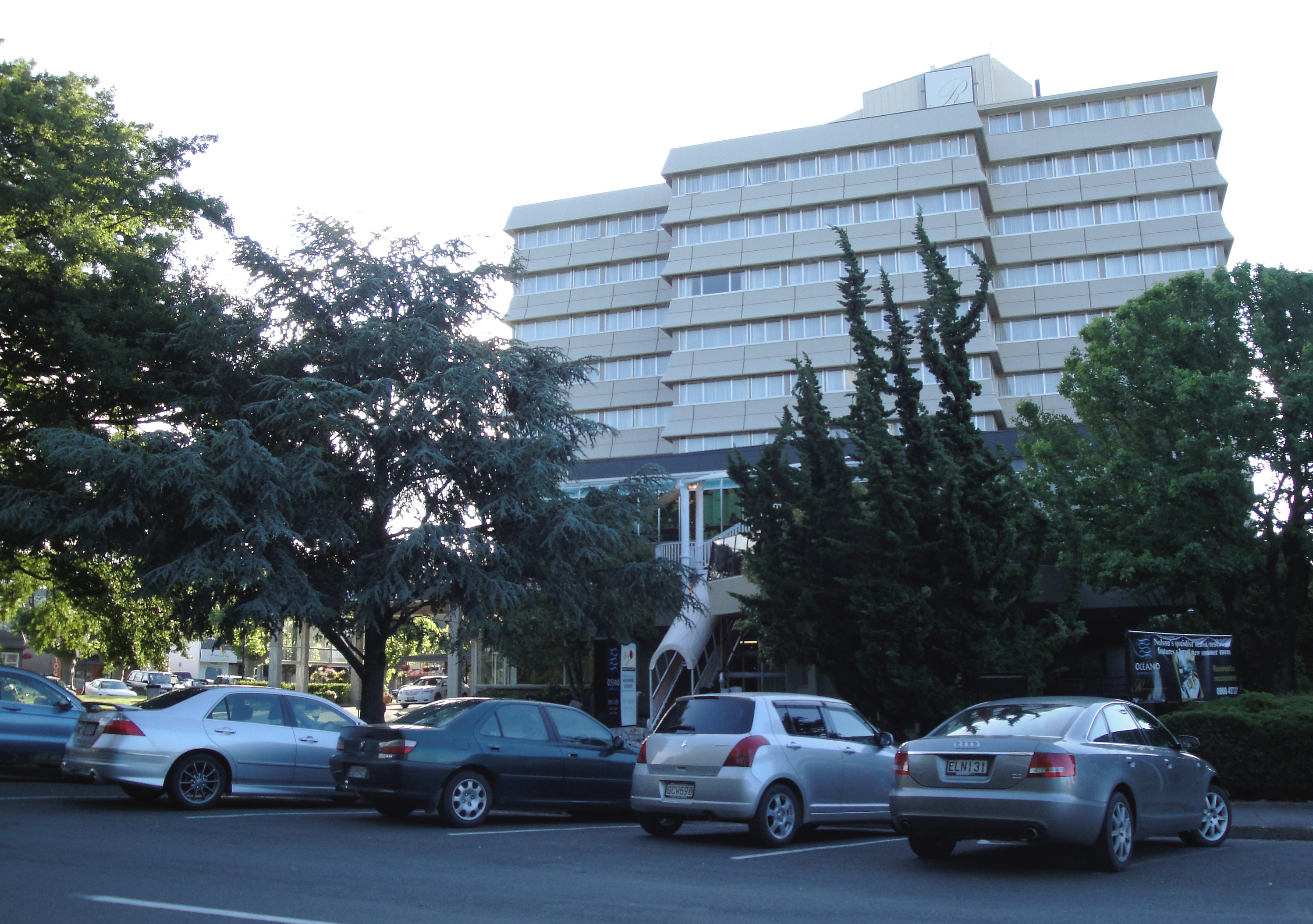
Rutherford Hotel

Unlike many towns and cities in New Zealand, Nelson has retained many Victorian buildings in its historic centre. The South Street area has been designated as having heritage value.

The tallest building is the 40 m (130 feet) tall Rutherford Hotel located on the west edge of Trafalgar Square.

==== Historic buildings ====
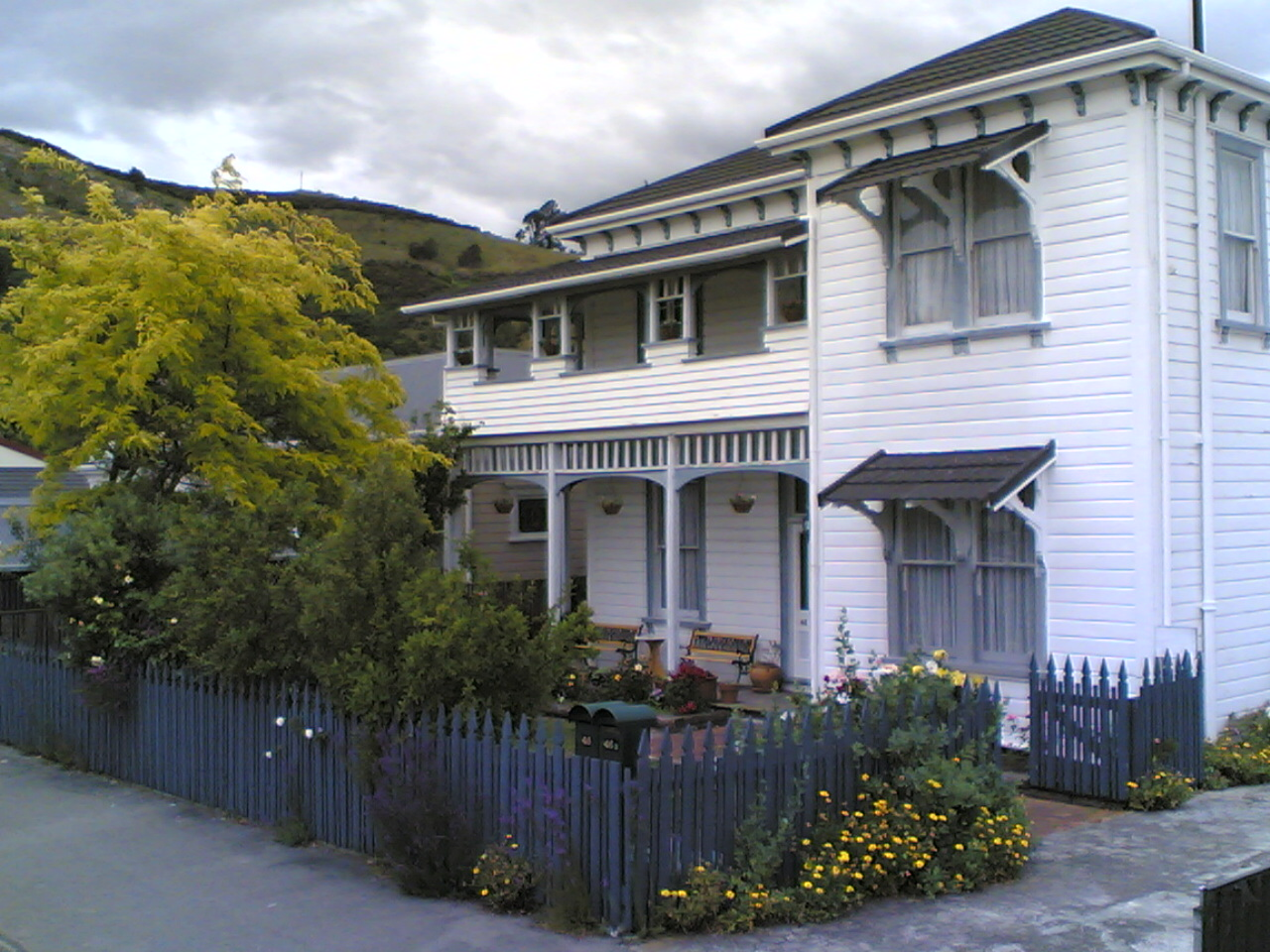
Amber House, a weatherboard colonial characteristic of much of New Zealand's residential architecture

- Nelson Cathedral
- Amber House
- Broadgreen Historic House was built in 1855 for Mr and Mrs Edmund Buxton, additionally with their six daughters. The house was later sold to Fred Langbein in 1901, who lived there with his family until 1965. In 1965, the house was bought by the Nelson City Council and is now used operated a museum for the general public.
- Cabragh House
- Fairfield House
- Founders Park Windmill
- Isel House was home to one of Nelson's first families, the Marsdens. Many of the rooms have been transformed into displays for the public to view. Restoration of the house is managed by Isel House Charitable Trust but the house and the park ground surrounding it are owned by the Nelson City Council.
- Nelson Central School Renwick House
- Nelson Centre of Musical Arts (formerly Nelson School of Music) Est. 1894

=== Marae ===
Whakatū Marae, in the suburb of Atawhai, is the marae (meeting ground) of Ngāti Kuia, Ngāti Kōata, Ngāti Rārua, Ngāti Tama ki Te Tau Ihu, Ngāti Toa Rangatira and Te Atiawa o Te Waka-a-Māui. It includes the Kākāti wharenui (meeting house). In October 2020, the Government committed $240,739 from the Provincial Growth Fund to restore the marae, creating an estimated 9 jobs.

=== Museums ===
Founders Heritage Park is an interactive park that shows the history of Nelson. The park is set up as a village filled with buildings set in a historical time, including well established gardens. Throughout the park, there are stories to be learned about the history of this town. It houses a number of groups with historical themes, including transport.

The Nelson Provincial Museum houses a collection of locally significant artefacts. The Nelson Classic Car Museum is home to a collection of more than 150 historical collectable cars, making it one of the largest automobile museums in the country.

=== Parks and zoo ===
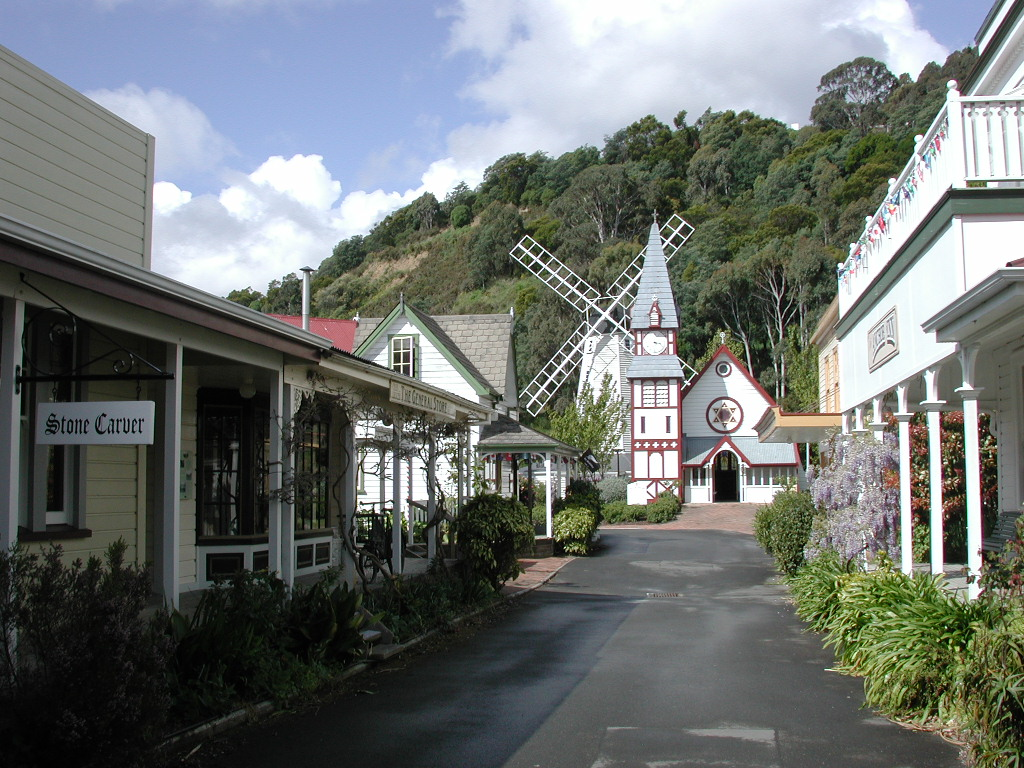
Founders Heritage Park

Nelson has a large number and variety of public parks and reserves maintained at public expense by the City Council. Major reserves include Grampians Reserve, close to the suburb of Braemar, and the Botanical Reserve in the east of Nelson, close to The Wood.

Natureland Wildlife Trust (formerly Natureland Zoological Park) is a small zoological facility close to Tāhunanui Beach. The facility is popular with children, where they can closely approach animals such as: monkeys (black-capped capuchins, cotton-top tamarins and pygmy marmosets), lemurs, meerkats, agoutis, porcupines, llamas, alpacas, Kune Kune pigs and peacocks. There are also green iguanas, tropical fish, kākās, keas and other birds including in a walk through aviary. Although the zoo nearly closed in 2008, the Orana Wildlife Trust took over its running instead. It looked like a bright future ahead for Natureland and its staff, but since the repeated earthquakes in Christchurch in 2011 and the damage to Orana Park, Orana Wildlife Trust are uncertain of the future of Natureland. Orana Wildlife Trust have since pulled out of Natureland, which is now run independently.

=== Symphony orchestra ===
Nelson Symphony Orchestra is a regional symphony orchestra that was originally known as the Nelson School of Music Orchestra, and was established in 1966. It became an independent Incorporated Society in 1995, and has been performing as the Nelson Symphony Orchestra since then.

=== Events and festivals ===
Several major events take place:

- Nelson Jazz & Blues Festival – January
- Nelson Kite Festival – January
- Nelson Yacht Regatta – January
- Baydreams-Nelson – January
- Taste Tasman – January
- Evolve Festival – January
- Adam Chamber Music Festival – biennial – January / February
- International Kai Festival – February
- Evolve Festival – February
- Weet-bix Kids TRYathlon – March
- Marchfest – March
- Taste Nelson festival – March
- Te Ramaroa Light Festival – biennial in June/July
- Winter Music Festival – July
- Nelson Arts Festival – October
- NZ Cider Festival – November
- Nelson A&P Show – November

The annual World of Wearable Art Awards was founded in Nelson in 1987 by Suzie Moncrieff. The first show was held at the restored William Higgins cob cottage in Spring Grove, near Brightwater. The show moved to Wellington in 2005 when it became too big to hold in Nelson. A local museum showcased winning designs alongside their collection of classic cars until the venture was forced to close because of the COVID-19 pandemic. The classic car museum re-opened in 2020.

=== Sister cities ===
Nelson has sister city relationships with:

- Miyazu, Japan (1976)
- Huangshi, China (1996)
- Yangjiang, China (2014)

Nelson's friendly city relationship(s):

- Massa Lubrense, Italy

== Infrastructure and services ==
=== Healthcare ===
The main hospital in Nelson is the Nelson Hospital.

The Manuka Street Hospital is a private institution.

=== Law enforcement ===
The Nelson Central Police Station, located in St John Street, is the headquarters for the Tasman Police District. In 2012/2013 the Tasman Police District had the lowest crime rate within New Zealand.

Several gangs and biker clubs have established themselves in Nelson. They include the now disbanded Lost Breed and the Red Devils (a support club for the Hells Angels). The Rebels Motorcycle Club also has a presence in the wider Nelson-Tasman area.

=== Electricity ===
The Nelson City Municipal Electricity Department (MED) established the city's public electricity supply in 1923, with electricity generated by a coal-fired power station at Wakefield Quay. The city was connected to the newly commissioned Cobb hydroelectric power station in 1944 and to the rest of the South Island grid in 1958. The grid connection saw the Wakefield Quay power station was relegated to standby duty before being decommissioned in 1964.

Today, Nelson Electricity operates the local distribution network in the former MED area, which covers the CBD and inner suburbs, while Network Tasman operates the local distribution network in the outer suburbs (including Stoke, Tāhunanui and Atawhai) and the nearby rural areas.

== Transport ==
=== Air transport ===
Nelson has had a long history with aviation. On 11 November 1921, the first plane landed in the city, an Avro 504K with a crew of Philip Fowler, Tom Newman, and Ted Ranish. In 1941, with the oncoming threat of Japanese attacks, the RNZAF Station Nelson was founded. The No. 2 Squadron RNZAF was based in Nelson during the Second World War, which served to protect troop convoys entering and leaving Wellington. In the Station was a Technical Training School, which specialised in engineering training and finding the airframes of captured aircraft.

Today, the station is at Nelson Airport, and acted as a base for Air Nelson. However, it ceased military activity in 1947. Nelson Airport is the fourth busiest airport in New Zealand, serving more than 750,000 passengers annually. It still uses many of the former air base's hangers.

Nelson Airport is at Annesbrook, an industrial suburb southwest of the central city. It operates a single terminal and 1,347-metre (4,419-foot) runway. About a million passengers use the airport annually and it was the fifth-busiest airport in New Zealand by passenger numbers in 2024. It is primarily used for domestic flights, with regular flights to and from Auckland, Christchurch, Hamilton, Kāpiti Coast, Palmerston North and Wellington. Sounds Air offers flights to and from Wellington. In 2006, it received restricted international airport status to facilitate small private jets.

The airport was home to Air Nelson, which operated and maintained New Zealand's largest domestic airline fleet, and is now merged into Air New Zealand. It was also the headquarters of Origin Pacific Airways until its collapse in 2006.

In February 2018, the approach road to the airport was flooded when the adjoining Jenkins Creek burst its banks during a storm that brought king tides and strong winds. The airport was closed for about one hour. In 2022, the NZ SeaRise programme identified Nelson airport as an area of particular vulnerability to sea level rise, with a projected subsidence of 5 millimetres (0.20 in) per year. The airport's chief executive said that the proposed runway extension would be planned around the latest sea level rise forecast, and that the airport was "here to stay", despite the concerns over the threats posed by sea level rise.

=== Maritime transport ===
Port Nelson is the maritime gateway for the Nelson, Tasman and Marlborough regions and an important hub for economic activity.

The following shipping companies call at the port:

- Australian National Line / CMA CGM
- Maersk Line
- Mediterranean Shipping Company
- Pacifica Shipping
- Toyofuji Shipping
- Swire Shipping

In the mid-1994, a group of local businessmen, fronted by local politician Owen Jennings, proposed building a deep-water port featuring a one-kilometre-long wharf extending from the Boulder Bank into Tasman Bay, where giant ships could berth and manoeuvre with ease. Known as Port Kakariki, the $97 million project was to become the hub to ship West Coast coal to Asia, as well as handling logs, which would be barged across Tasman Bay from Mapua.

In January 2010, the Western Blue Highway, a Nelson to New Plymouth ferry service, was proposed by Port Taranaki. However, to date, neither the Interislander nor Bluebridge have shown any interest in the route.

The Anchor Shipping and Foundry Company was formed 31 March 1901 from the earlier companies of Nathaniel Edwards & Co (1857–1880) and the Anchor Steam Shipping Company (1880–1901). The Anchor Company never departed from its original aim of providing services to the people of Nelson and the West Coast of the South Island and was never a large company; it only owned 37 ships during its history. At its peak around 1930, there were 16 vessels in the fleet. The company operated three nightly return trips per week ferry service between Nelson and Wellington and a daily freight service was maintained between the two ports in conjunction with the Pearl Kasper Shipping Company, while another service carried general cargo on a Nelson–Onehunga route. In 1974, the Anchor Company was sold and merged into the Union Company.

=== Public transport ===
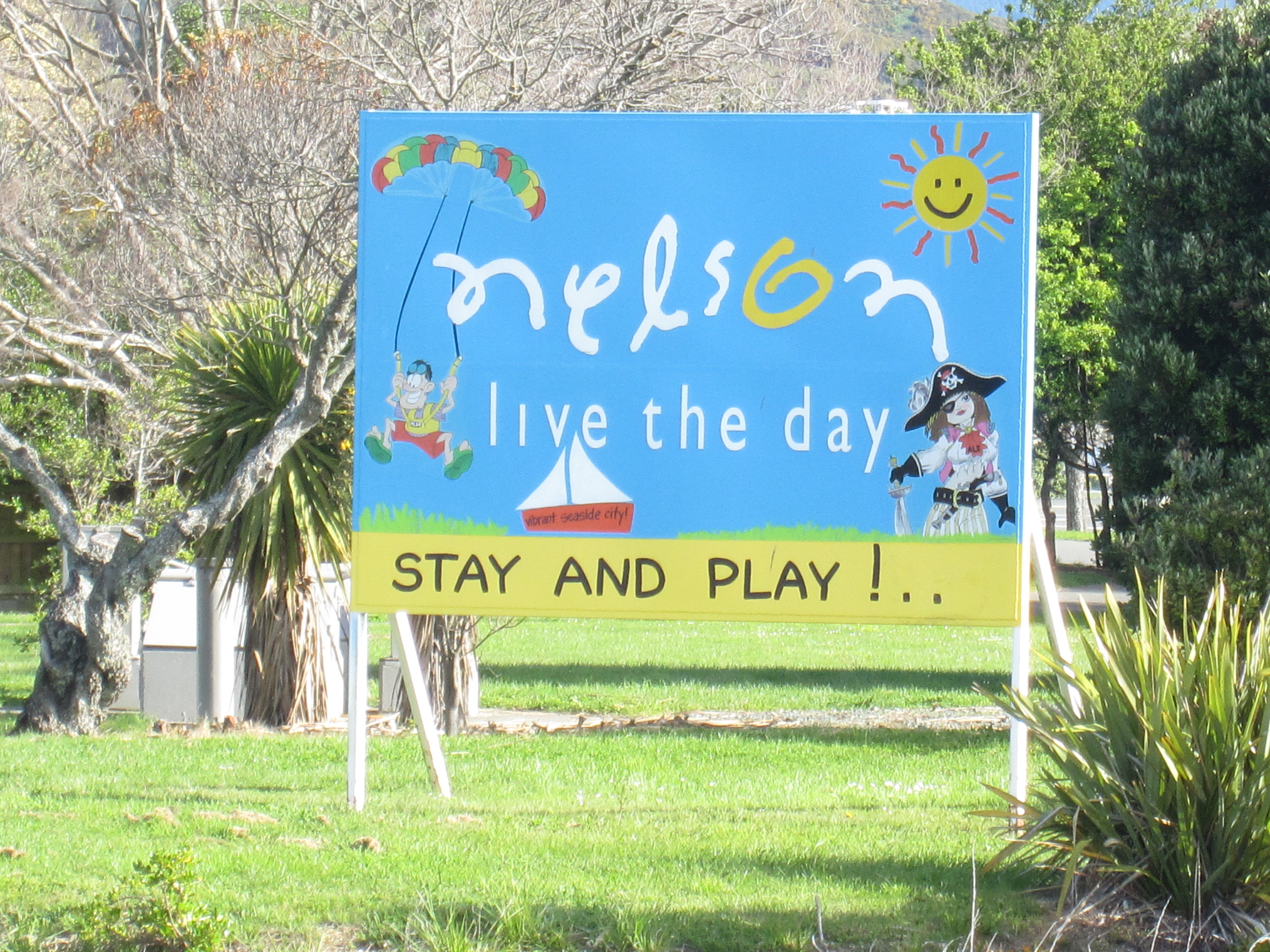
The sign that welcomes visitors to Nelson

The passenger and freight company Newmans Coach Lines was formed in Nelson in 1879, and merged with Transport Nelson in 1972. Nelson Motor Service Company ran the first motor bus in Nelson in 1906 and took over the Palace omnibuses in 1907. InterCity provides daily bus services connecting Nelson with towns and cities around the South Island.

Ebus provides public transport services between Nelson, Richmond, Motueka and Wakefield as well as on two local routes connecting Atawhai, Nelson Hospital, The Brook and Nelson Airport.

Route numbers	Start	via	End	Notes
1	Nelson	Hospital, Bishopdale, Stoke	Richmond	
2	Nelson	Tāhunanui, Annesbrook, Stoke	Richmond	
3	Atawhai	The Wood, Nelson, Toi Toi	Hospital	
4	Airport	Washington Valley, Nelson, NMIT	The Brook	
5	Nelson	Richmond, Māpua, Tasman Village	Motueka	
6	Nelson	Richmond, Hope, Brightwater	Wakefield	

The Late Late Bus is a weekend night transport service between Nelson and Richmond. NBus Cards were replaced by Bee Cards on 3 August 2020.

Taxi companies include Nelson Bays Cabs, Nelson City Taxis and Sun City Taxis.

=== Rail transport ===
The Dun Mountain Railway was a horse-drawn tramway that served a mine from 1862 to 1901. The Nelson Section was an isolated, 3 ft 6 in (1,067 mm) gauge, government-owned railway line between Nelson and Glenhope that operated for 79 years between 1876 and 1955. In 1886, a route was proposed from Nelson to the junction of the Midland Railway Company at Buller via Richmond, Waimea West, Upper Moutere, Motueka, the Motueka Valley, Tadmor and Glenhope.

The only rail activity today is a short heritage operation run by the Nelson Railway Society from Founders Heritage Park using their own line between Wakefield Grove and Grove. The society has proposed future extensions of their line, possibly into or near the city centre. Nelson is one of only five major urban areas in New Zealand without a rail connection – the others being Taupō, Rotorua, Gisborne and Queenstown. There have been several proposals to connect Nelson to the South Island rail network, but none have come to fruition.

=== Roading ===
The Nelson urban area is served by State Highway 6, which runs in a north to southwest direction. The highway travels through the city and nearby town of Richmond, continuing southwest across the plains of the Wairoa and Motueka Rivers. Plans to construct a motorway linking North Nelson to Brightwater in the south have so far been unsuccessful. A number of studies have been undertaken since 2007 including the 2007 North Nelson to Brightwater Study, the Southern Link Road Project and the Arterial Traffic Study. On 28 June 2013, the Nelson Mayor Aldo Miccio and Nelson MP Nick Smith jointly wrote to Transport Minister Gerry Brownlee seeking for the Southern Link to be given Road of National Significance (RoNS) status.

Other significant road projects proposed over the years include a cross-city tunnel from Tāhunanui Drive to Haven Road; or from Annesbrook (or Tāhunanui) to Emano Street in Victory Square; or from Tāhunanui to Washington Valley.

== Media ==
The Nelson Examiner was the first newspaper published in the South Island. It was established by Charles Elliott (1811–1876) in 1842, within a few weeks of New Zealand Company settlers arriving in Nelson. Other early newspapers were The Colonist and the Nelson Evening Mail. Today, Stuff Ltd publishes the Nelson Mail four days a week, and the community paper The Nelson Tasman Leader weekly. The city's largest circulating newspaper is the locally owned Nelson Weekly, which is published every Wednesday.

WildTomato was a glossy monthly lifestyle magazine focused on the Nelson and Marlborough regions. It was launched by Murray Farquhar as a 16-page local magazine in Nelson in July 2006, and put into liquidation in March 2021.

The city is served by all major national radio and television stations, with terrestrial television (Freeview) and FM radio. Local radio stations include The Hits (formerly Radio Nelson), More FM (formerly Fifeshire FM), The Breeze, ZM (formerly The Planet 97FM) and community station Fresh FM. The city has one local television station, Mainland Television.

== Sport ==
The first ever rugby union match in New Zealand took place at the Botanic Reserve in Nelson on 14 May 1870, with around 200 people spectating the game between the Nelson Football Club (today the Nelson Rugby Football Club) and Nelson College. The game concluded as a 2–0 victory to the Football Club. An informative commemorative plaque was renovated at the western edge of the grassed area by Nelson City Council in 2006, to honour the historic milestone moment in the history of New Zealand rugby.

Major sports teams

Club	Sport	Founded	League	Venue
Nelson Cricket Association	Cricket	1858	Hawke Cup	Saxton Oval
Nelson Giants	Basketball	1982	National Basketball League	Trafalgar Centre
Nelson Suburbs FC	Football	1962	Southern League; Chatham Cup	Saxton Field
Tasman Mako	Rugby Union	2006	Bunnings NPC	Trafalgar Park
Tasman Titans	Rugby league	1995	Rugby League Cup	Trafalgar Park
Tasman United	Football	2015	ISPS Handa Premiership	Trafalgar Park

Major venues

Image	Venue
	Saxton Oval
	The Trafalgar Centre
	Trafalgar Park
	Theatre Royal

Nelson has also served as a training location for professional Japanese long-distance runners.

== Education ==
There are four secondary schools: Garin College, Nayland College, Nelson College and Nelson College for Girls.

Nelson hosts two tertiary education institutions. The main one is Nelson Marlborough Institute of Technology, which has two main campuses, one in Nelson and the other in Blenheim in Marlborough. The institute has been providing tertiary education in the Nelson-Marlborough region for the last 100 years. Nelson also has a University of Canterbury College of Education campus, which currently has an intake two out of every three years for the primary sector.

== Notable people ==
- Sophia Anstice – seamstress and businesswoman
- Harry Atmore – politician
- Francis Bell – politician
- George Bennett – cyclist
- Chester Borrows – politician
- Mark Bright – rugby union player
- Jeremy Brockie – footballer
- Cory Brown – footballer
- Paul Brydon – footballer
- Mel Courtney – politician
- Ryan Crotty – rugby union player
- Rod Dixon – athlete
- Frederick Richard Edmund Emmett – music dealer and colour therapist
- Dame Sister Pauline Engel – nun and educator
- Finn Fisher-Black – cyclist
- Rose Frank – photographer
- John Guy – cricket player
- Isaac Mason Hill – social reformer, servant, storekeeper and ironmonger
- Frederick Nelson Jones – inventor
- Nina Jones – painter
- Charles Littlejohn – rower
- Liam Malone – athlete
- Simon Mannering – rugby league player
- Aldo Miccio – politician
- Marjorie Naylor – artist
- Edgar Neale – politician
- Geoffrey Palmer – politician and former Prime Minister
- Nick Smith – politician
- Frank Howard Nelson Stapp – concert impresario
- Rhian Sheehan – composer and musician
- Riki van Steeden – footballer
- Mike Ward – politician
- George William Wallace Webber – postmaster, boarding-house keeper and farmer
- Nate Wilbourne – environmentalist
- Guy Williams – comedian
- Paul Williams – comedian

== Panoramas ==
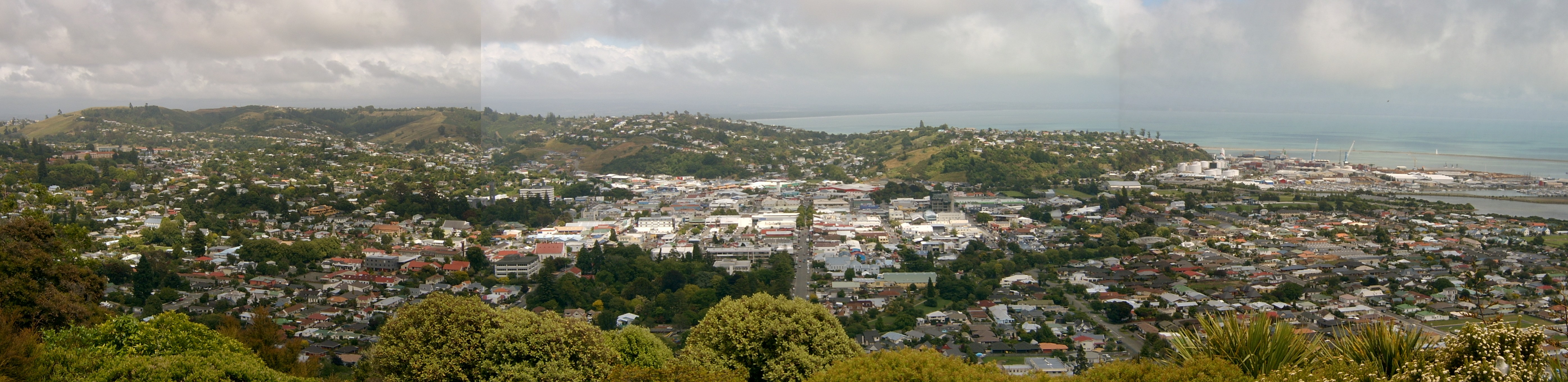
A panorama of Nelson City from the Centre of New Zealand monument

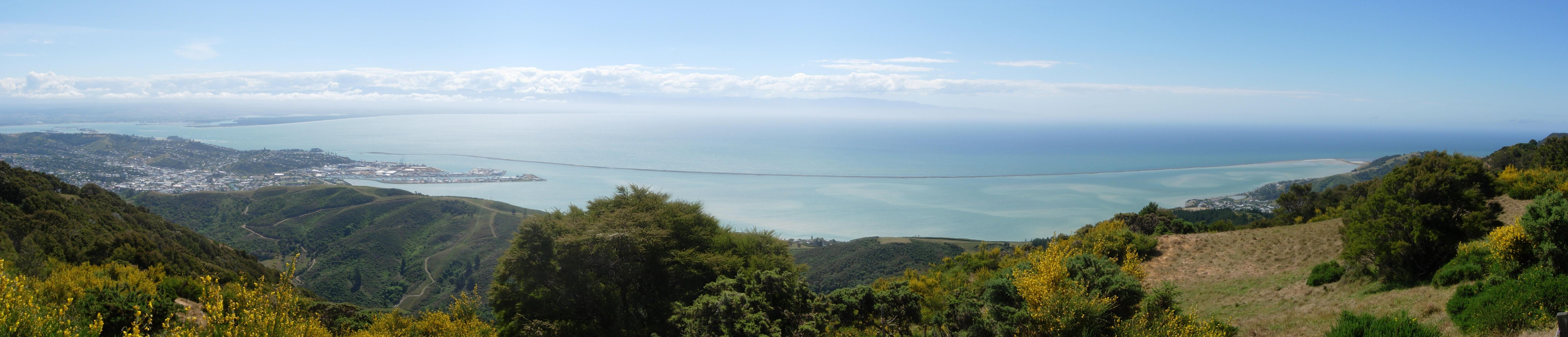
The Boulder Bank is an unusual natural formation in Nelson.

== See also ==
- List of twin towns and sister cities in New Zealand
