= Wild Tomato =

Wild Tomato may refer to:

- Wild tomato, a group of plants and their fruit of genus Lycopersicon
- WildTomato, a lifestyle magazine in New Zealand
