= Cabragh House =

House in Nelson, New Zealand

Coordinates: 41.2667°S 173.2932°E

Cabragh House (school and residence) is a late Victorian, timber house at 48 Weka Street in Nelson, New Zealand built circa 1897. It is a historic site for exemplarising late Victorian furnishings and provincial New Zealand vernacular architecture. The neighbouring Amber House, the former site of the Cabragh House School, is pending registration as a New Zealand Historic Place.

== Location ==
Satellite imagery clearly shows how land reclamation to the North of Cabragh House has moved the shoreline considerably northwards from when the house was originally built on the shores of the Nelson Inlet.

== Ownership history ==
According to provincial records, on 7 August 1901, John Pearson Hornsby, a Nelson accountant, purchased land in Weka Street (part sections of Section 258 and 260 and, later, Section 262. These sections already held two dwellings (now numbered 46 and 48) but then known as 36 and 38 Weka Street respectively. Originally, it seems, the larger two-storey house at 36 was the dwelling and residence of Mr Hornsby and his daughters (known as the Misses Hornsby. Then the single-storey house at 38 was used as a private boarding and day school for girls and "little" boys, as indicated by the 1910 Electoral Register.

According to a Prize Day speech delivered by the Principal in the Druids Hall on 10 December 1917 and reported in The Colonist the next day, The school was founded in 1906. However, this is in conflict with an article in the same newspaper that appeared on 21 August 1905 that indicates an opening date of 15 September 1905. Between 1909 and 1917 Cabragh House School was heavily promoted in local almanacs, street directories and the Post & Telegraph New Zealand Directory.

Although this Hornsby land transfer was registered in 1901, it is probable that both buildings existed before this time. The Architectural design of both Cabragh House and the adjoining Amber House indicates a date of construction for both houses somewhere between 1895 and 1905. To support this contention, an original photograph, principally of the two-storey house then at 36 Weka Street, has printed on its reverse “CABRAGH House school & home, Weka Street, Nelson NZ. Late 1890s school started & staffed by Hornsby sisters Charlotte (Lizzy), Ruth & Janetta”. Municipal drain layer plans and sheets also indicate a probable date of erection for both houses in early 1897.

The private school business was successful in provincial Nelson - especially for people with the right qualifications. An advertisement in the Nelson Streets Directory indicates that Miss Jannetta M Hornsby B.A., N.Z.U., A.R.C.M. (London) also had rooms at 50 Trafalgar Street as a teacher of pianoforte, theory, singing, elocution and languages as well as being Principal of Cabragh House School.

However, a search of the deeds reveals that none of the sisters Hornsby ever owned legal title to either the School or Dwelling House located at either 36 or 38 Weka Street.

In February 1908, John Hornsby mortgaged 38 Weka Street for government advances for unknown purposes. The money could have been put towards improvements for both structures. Such improvements may have included a two-storey porch and bracketed awnings added to Amber House sometime between 1906 and 1920. In 1918, Amber House (renumbered from 36 to 46 Weka Street) was used exclusively as classrooms and boarding accommodation and Cabragh House (renumbered from 38 to 48 Weka Street) became a residence.

=== School ===
The Amber House was known as Cabragh House School during the first decades of the twentieth century, not to be confused with the dwelling known as the Cabragh House next door.

On 28 April 1919 John Hornsby died at his residence in Weka Street, aged 85 years.

The Obituary in The Colonist the next day included the following: "Prior to coming to New Zealand about 25 years ago, he held several important positions on the Irish railways. Although he never took much interest in civic affairs, he was a keen advocate of the through freights system, on the subject of which he contributed several valuable articles. His daughters conducted the Cabragh House School successfully for many years."

In October of that year a Certificate of Addendum was issued. The Public Trustee conveyed a portion of the property for private sale. Now the renumbered 46 and 48 Weka Street were passed to daughter Charlotte, who sold it to Henry Canning in 1928.

The last listing for Cabragh House School in Lucas's Nelson Almanac is for 1927 and there is no entry for the School in the 1928 Post Office Directory. Certainly by 1928 Cabragh House School was no longer operating as a school, its scholastic function and commercial viability having been rendered superfluous by the steady growth of, what is now called, Nelson Central School.

== Etymology ==
The word Cabragh probably has Irish or other Gaelic roots due to the Hornsby's Irish origins and may be an unorthodox spelling of Gabragh meaning an area of rough grazing.
