= Paul Brydon =

Paul Brydon may refer to:

- Paul Brydon (cyclist)
- Paul Brydon (footballer)
