= Isaac Hill (social reformer) =

Isaac Mason Hill (c.1816 – 31 August 1885) was a social reformer, servant, storekeeper and ironmonger from New Zealand. He was born in Birmingham, England on c.1816. He died in Nelson, New Zealand on 31 August 1885.
