= Frank Howard Nelson Stapp =

New Zealand railway worker and concert impresario

Frank Howard Nelson Stapp (1908–1993) was a notable New Zealand railway worker and concert impresario. He was born in Nelson, New Zealand in 1908.
