= Sharland Creek =

Stream in New Zealand

Coordinates: 41°16′34″S 173°19′42″E

Sharland Creek flows south and joins Packer Creek before flowing into the Maitai / Mahitahi River near Waahi Takaaro Golf Course in Nelson, New Zealand. Sharland Creek takes its name from an early European landowner, James Henry Sharland, who bought land in the area now named Sharland Hill. The land remained in the family until 1969 when it was bought by the State Forest Service.

Restoration of the Maitai River and all of its tributaries was the focus of Project Maitai / Mahitahi, a Nelson City Council and community initiative which ran from 2014 to 2018.
