= Annesbrook =

Suburb of Nelson, New Zealand

- Suburb
- Interactive map of Annesbrook
- Coordinates: 41°18′00″S 173°14′10″E
- Country: New Zealand
- Region: Nelson
- Ward: Stoke-Tāhunanui General Ward; Whakatū Māori Ward
- Electorates: Nelson; Te Tai Tonga (Māori)

Government
  - Territorial Authority: Nelson City Council
  - Nelson City Mayor: Nick Smith
  - Nelson MP: Rachel Boyack
  - Te Tai Tonga MP: Tākuta Ferris

Area
  - Total: 2.96 km^{2} (1.14 sq mi)
  - Land: 2.96 km^{2} (1.14 sq mi)
  - Water: 0 km^{2} (0 sq mi)

Population (June 2025)
  - Total: 70
  - Density: 24/km^{2} (61/sq mi)
- Time zone: UTC+12 (NZST)
  - Summer (DST): UTC+13 (NZDT)
- Postcode: 7011
- Area code: 03

Annesbrook is an industrial suburb of Nelson, New Zealand.

It lies between State Highway 6 and Nelson Airport to the southwest of Nelson city centre and north of Stoke.

The Nelson Classic Car Museum (which was previously the World of WearableArt & Classic Cars Museum) is located in Annesbrook.

== Geography ==
The corresponding statistical area of Nelson Airport covers an area of 2.96 km^{2}.

== History ==
The estimated population of the area reached 80 in 1996.

It reached 90 in 2001, 96 in 2006, 105 in 2013, and 96 in 2018.

Annesbrook lost its post office when 580 others closed, or were reduced, on 5 February 1988.

== Demography ==
The statistical area of Nelson Airport had an estimated population of 70 as of June 2025, with a population density of 24 people per km^{2}.

Historical population
Year	Pop.	±% p.a.
2006	96	—
2013	105	+1.29%
2018	96	−1.78%
2023	72	−5.59%

Nelson Airport had a population of 72 in the 2023 New Zealand census, a decrease of 24 people (−25.0%) since the 2018 census, and a decrease of 33 people (−31.4%) since the 2013 census. There were 39 males, 30 females, and 3 people of other genders in 30 dwellings. 4.2% of people identified as LGBTIQ+. The median age was 39.9 years (compared with 38.1 years nationally). There were 12 people (16.7%) aged under 15 years, 15 (20.8%) aged 15 to 29, 36 (50.0%) aged 30 to 64, and 6 (8.3%) aged 65 or older.

People could identify as more than one ethnicity. The results were 79.2% European (Pākehā); 8.3% Māori; 12.5% Pasifika; 4.2% Asian; and 4.2% Middle Eastern, Latin American and African New Zealanders (MELAA). English was spoken by 91.7%, Samoan by 8.3%, and other languages by 8.3%. No language could be spoken by 4.2% (e.g. too young to talk). The percentage of people born overseas was 29.2, compared with 28.8% nationally.

The sole religious affiliation given was 33.3% Christian. People who answered that they had no religion were 54.2%, and 12.5% of people did not answer the census question.

Of those at least 15 years old, 6 (10.0%) people had a bachelor's or higher degree, 33 (55.0%) had a post-high school certificate or diploma, and 15 (25.0%) people exclusively held high school qualifications. The median income was $33,500, compared with $41,500 nationally. The employment status of those at least 15 was 27 (45.0%) full-time, 12 (20.0%) part-time, and 3 (5.0%) unemployed.

== Economy ==
In 2018, 21.1% worked in manufacturing, 5.3% worked in construction, 21.1% worked in hospitality, 5.3% worked in transport, and 5.3% worked in education.

== Transport ==
As of 2018, among those who commuted to work, 63.2% drove a car, 5.3% rode in a car, 15.8% used a bike, and 15.8% walk or run.

No one used public transport.
