= Rutherford Hotel =

Hotel in Nelson, New Zealand

Coordinates: 41.2758°S 173.2836°E

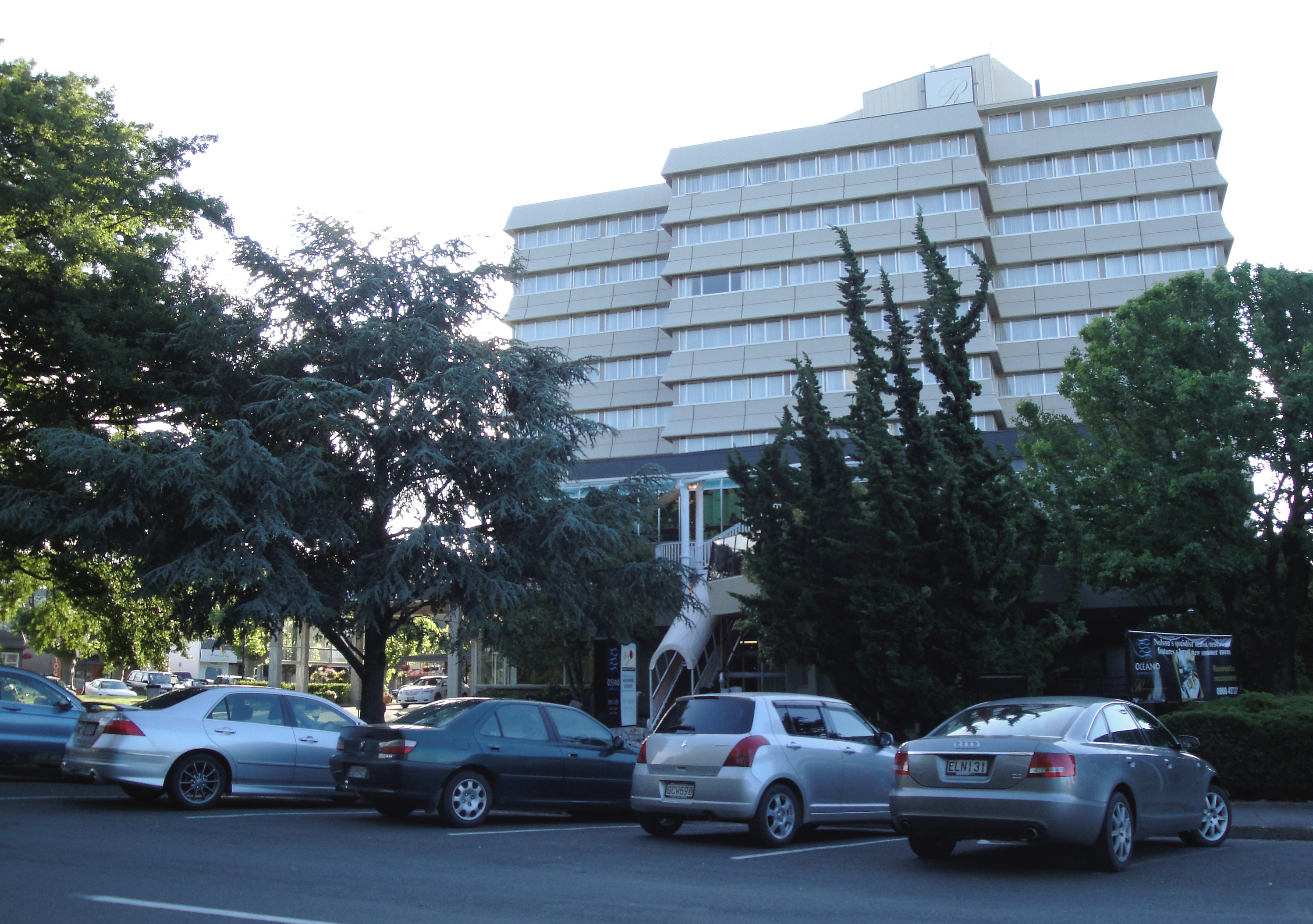
Rutherford Hotel as seen from Trafalgar Square

The Rutherford Hotel (named after Sir Ernest Rutherford) is a luxury accommodation hotel in Nelson, New Zealand. It is the biggest hotel in Nelson and the city's tallest building. It is part of the chain company Heritage Hotels, which have hotels based in many locations around New Zealand.

== History ==
The Freemasons' Arms on the corner of Trafalgar and Bridge Streets received one of the first eight liquor licenses issued in the Nelson area in 1842. The hotel had various names during its history and was last called the Central Hotel. Its last owner, DB Breweries, closed it in December 1972 and transferred the liquor license to its new hotel, the DB Rutherford Hotel, which was officially opened on 18 December 1972 by Prime Minister Norman Kirk. It was named after Ernest Rutherford, who was born in nearby Brightwater (then called Spring Grove).

The land that the hotel is built on previously housed Nelson Breweries, which stemmed from the merger of two of Nelson's larger breweries. Previous Mayors of Nelson involved in the companies include Joseph Dodson and Joseph Auty Harley; the latter lived in Fifeshire House next door to Rutherford Hotel. Nelson Breweries were purchased by DB Breweries in 1969, and that provided the land on which the hotel was to be built.

The hotel's name, DB Rutherford, caused confusion as to who the man with those initials were. Some of Rutherford's relatives demanded that his name be dropped based on him having been a teetotaller (which is apparently incorrect). When the Quality Inn group bought the hotel, the Rutherford name was dropped against the wishes of many staff and locals. As part of a major refurbishment, the Rutherford name was reinstated due to public pressure.

In mid-2012, development of a larger conference centre started, able to hold 500 (banquet-style) to 700 (theatre-style) attendees. The National Party held its 2013 annual conference in the new facility in August.

== Location ==
The hotel is located at a slight left from the intersection of Trafalgar Square and Nile Street West, and the main entrance is on Trafalgar Square. The hotel stands on the west edge of Trafalgar Square, the gardens surrounding Nelson Cathedral. The Cathedral's bell tower stands close to the hotel, and can be seen from rooms in the southern wing.

== Exterior ==
At 10 floors and 40 m tall, the hotel dominates the Nelson skyline and can be seen from other suburbs. It is also easily identifiable by the large sign with a golden, curly R on top of the building. It is a Bisque colour in appearance. Adjacent to the lobby entrance is the Hogland Glass company retail outlet. There is a swimming pool located outside the hotel. The hotel surpassed the then-tallest building, the Post Office Building. The hotel is located in the Nelson CBD.

== Interior and lobby ==
The hotel lobby has the main desk slightly left of the entrance, and a grand staircase, leading to the mezzanine, and then to the other floors. The lobby has elevators operating from the bottom floor to the top floor. There is a large wishing fountain located in the lobby, and often there will be a classic car parked in the lobby for viewing, from the Nelson Classic Car Museum. The hotel has 9 floors and 113 rooms, a private outdoor pool as well as a gymnasium and sauna. There are several dining options in the hotel: the Oceano restaurant, the Atom Cafe, and the nautical themed Port 'o' Call bar.
