= Brook Stream (New Zealand) =

Tributary of the Maitai / Mahitahi River in Nelson, South Island, New Zealand

Coordinates: 41°16′32″S 173°17′39″E

Brook Stream, or Waimarama, is a major tributary of the Maitai / Mahitahi River in Nelson, South Island, New Zealand.

Nelson's first water scheme was on Brook Stream, with a weir and pipeline constructed in 1867 in what is now the Brook Waimarama Sanctuary. Demand began to exceed supply, and a second weir was constructed to create the Top Dam in 1909. By the 1930s it was insufficient for Nelson's growing population. The Roding River waterworks scheme was completed in 1941 and an intake on the Maitai Mahitahi South Branch completed in 1963. The Brook Dam was decommissioned in 2000.

Restoration of Brook Stream, and waterways in the Maitai catchment, has been a major focus of Project Maitai, a Nelson City Council initiative to improve the health of the Maitai River and all its tributaries.
