= Frederick Richard Edmund Emmett =

- Born: December 11, 1903; Nelson, New Zealand
- Died: July 3, 1974 (aged 70); New Zealand
- Occupations: Music dealer, colour therapist
- Known for: Early practitioner of colour therapy in New Zealand

Frederick Richard Edmund Emmett (11 December 1903 – 3 July 1974) was a New Zealand music dealer and colour therapist. He was born in Nelson, New Zealand on 11 December 1903.
