= Philip Fowler =

New Zealand pilot

Philip Kenning Fowler
- Fowler as Commandant of the Air Training Corps New Zealand in 1944
- Born: 10 June, 1885; Cheltenham, New Zealand
- Died: 12 August, 1970; Palmerston North
- Burial place: Kelvin Grove Cemetery, Palmerston North
- Spouse: Kathleen Mary Galpin
- Military career
- Allegiance: New Zealand, United Kingdom
- Branch: Royal New Zealand Air Force, Royal Naval Air Service
- Service years: 1914–1945
- Rank: Wing Commander
- Nickname: Shorty
- Service number: NZ1159
- Unit: No. 4 Squadron RNZAF
- Commands: Commandant of the Air Training Corps New Zealand
- Known for: First person to fly to Nelson
- Conflicts: World War 1; Aegean Sea Theater; Dardanelles; World War 2

Philip Kenning Fowler (10 June 1885 – 12 August 1970) was a pilot for the Royal New Zealand Air Force and the Royal Naval Air Service and an aviation pioneer. Fowler served in the First World War in the Mediterranean and as a pilot trainer during the Second World War.

Fowler is notable for being the first person to fly an aircraft into Nelson, when he flew an Avro 504K across the Cook Strait on 11 November 1921.

== Biography ==
=== Early Life ===
Philip Kenning Fowler was born on 10 June 1885 in the village of Cheltenham, New Zealand. In 1891, the family moved to Manakau, where he attended the Levin District High School, and then later to Feilding.

Upon the outbreak of the First World War, he left the motor engineering job he had been working at and moved to England to join the Royal Air Force, due to the lack of a local one.

=== Military Career ===
Fowler in 1917

When Fowler arrived in England, he intended to join either the RAF or the British Army Transport. He joined the former and was sent to the East Mediterranean Sea as a flight sub-lieutenant in late 1915. He used the H.M.S. Ark Royal as a base, and would fly to Bulgaria to run bombing raids using a Farman F.220 heavy bomber. He would also fly Sopwith Camels. In October of 1917, he received a promotion to Flight Lieutenant.

In 1917, Fowler was sent back to New Zealand with Malaria, but returned before the end of the year. He was now a part of the newly-formed RAF, and served in Dover shooting down zeppelins. It was here that he was promoted to Captain in April 1918.

=== Flight to Nelson ===
The crew of the flight in Nelson. Fowler is the third from the left.

When he returned to New Zealand, he remained in the RAF. He now lived in Lyall Bay, Wellington, and was, on 11 November, 1921, approached by Tom Newman of the Newman Brothers Motor Service. They set off from Lyall Bay Football Ground, owned by Rongotai College, in a converted Avro 504, a military biplane.

The flight took 2 hours and 20 minutes and was the fourth flight over the Cook Straight, but the first to land in Nelson. Throughout the flight, fuel was a major concern, with the plane having to land earlier than intended due to it. After the flight, he stayed in Nelson for several weeks, taking passengers up for flights.

After spending three weeks in Nelson, he flew to Motueka in the same plane, becoming the first person to land there as well. In Motueka, he did the same as he did in Nelson, taking passengers for flights. Later, he returned to Hawkes Bay.

In 1923, he piloted the first float plane into Nelson.

=== Second World War ===
He changed to the New Zealand Air Force in 1923 and retained his rank was promoted to the rank of Squadron Leader, in 1930. Afterwards, he retired from the military and joined the New Zealand Air Transport Company, which closed down after two years. Afterwards, he worked with the Walsh Brothers in Kohimaramara, along with various other engineering companies.

In 1940, Fowler was recalled to the Administrative and Special Deputies Branch of the RNZAF as an honorary Squadron Leader. He was sent to Ohakea Air Base to be Chief Ground Instructor for ground training air crew. The next year, he was made a full Squadron Leader. In 1944, he took over the Auckland wing of the Air Training Corps, and became an acting Wing Commander. In March of 1945, became Commandant for the Air Training Corps for all of New Zealand, when he was also promoted to full Wing Commandeer.

=== Later Life and Death ===
After the war, Fowler retired to Palmerston North. He died on 12 August 1970, and was interred in Kelvin Grove Cemetery.
