= Amber House =

Building in Nelson, New Zealand

Coordinates: 41°16′00″S 173°17′35″E

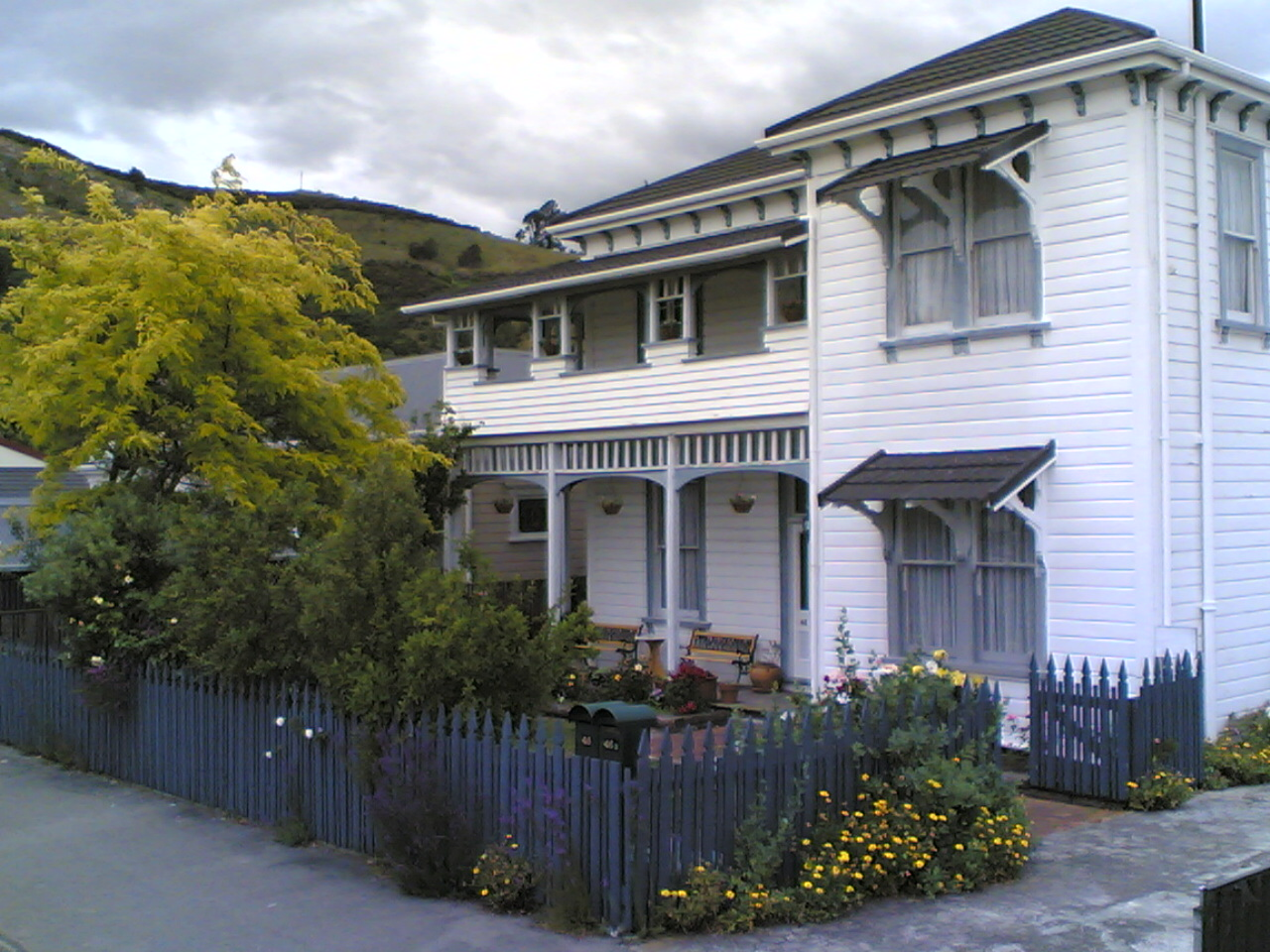
1897 Amber House (Photograph taken from the northwest in late southern hemisphere winter with the Centre of New Zealand visible above the roofline)

Amber House is one of the older two-storey villas in New Zealand's third founded city of Nelson in the top of the South Island at 46 Weka Street.

It is a traditional colonial-style construction using native rimu and mataī timbers with an external brick chimney that originally served four large fireplaces.

The original, highly decorated, cast iron sewage vent pipes are still intact and visible on the exterior of the building.

== Cabragh House School ==
From 1906 until 1927 Amber House housed a "Boarding and Day School for Girls and Little Boys" known as Cabragh House School operated by the Hornsby family from Ireland. Edwardian photographs of both the scholars and the school have been preserved.

== Original wallpaper ==
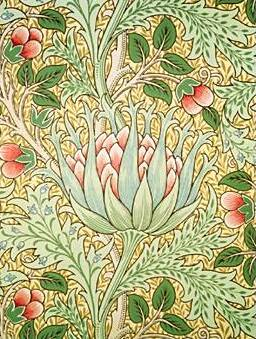
"Artichoke" wallpaper designed by John Henry Dearle for Morris & Co., circa 1897

Amber House preserves a small section of its original unfaded wallpaper from the late 19th century that was revealed during recent renovations.

Because New Zealand has had for the last two centuries (and continues to have) the highest ultraviolet exposure levels of any populated region on earth it is extremely rare to find used (as opposed to unused roll) examples of Victorian era wallpaper in New Zealand that have not faded badly.

This remarkable state of preservation is rather surprising considering that Nelson competes yearly with its neighbours Richmond and Blenheim for claiming the highest number of sunshine hours in the country, with an annual average total of over 2,400 hours.

== Earthquake resilience ==
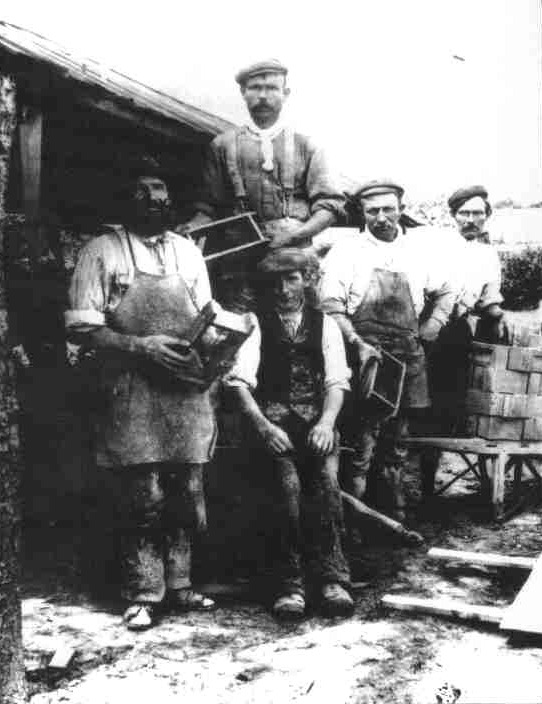
Victorian brick making

Of particular interest is the tall brick chimney on the west side of Amber House that has survived major earthquakes in 1929 (Arthur's Pass and Murchison), 1968 (Īnangahua) and 1994 without a single crack blemishing its surface.

There has been speculation that, because deep below Amber House are separate beds of shale and sand, these strata have acted like a naturally occurring analogue of the earthquake resistant of the Parliament House in Wellington to reduce the incidence of short periodicity lateral waves at Amber House during earthquakes.

The evident resilience of this old chimney means that it is even possible that it pre-dates the 1893 magnitude 6.9 Nelson earthquake that moved the spire of Christ Church Cathedral in Nelson nearly a metre out of the vertical plane.

== Old English Walnut tree ==
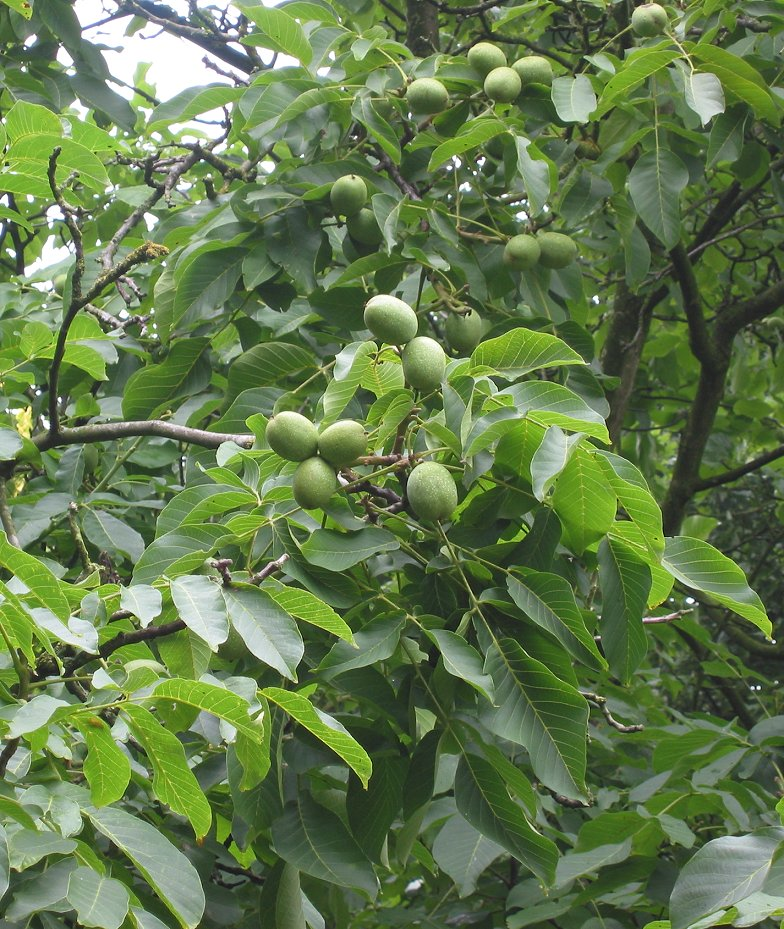
English Walnut Tree in late summer showing the fruits

Amber House has the oldest English Walnut tree (Juglans regia) in the South Island in the back garden. Although old, this venerable tree is relatively small since, when it was originally planted, it would have been only yards from the original shoreline and on very sandy soil with the roots lacking an adequate water supply. This desiccation has resulted in an almost Bonsai like effect.

== Bibliography ==
- Lucas's Nelson almanac. Lucas. 1927.
- Hindmarsh, Gerard (April 1997). "Images from the Frontier: the Tyrees' priceless legacy". New Zealand Geographic. Vol. 34. pp. 54–71.
