= WildTomato =

New Zealand lifestyle magazine

- WildTomato magazine, December 2008 issue
- Editor: Lynda Papesch
- Categories: Lifestyle
- Frequency: Monthly
- Founded: 2006
- First issue: July 2006
- Company: WildTomato Media
- Country: New Zealand

WildTomato is a monthly lifestyle magazine focused on the Nelson and Marlborough regions in the northern part of the South Island of New Zealand. The regional magazine was launched in July 2006. It was put into liquidation in March 2021 with the first liquidators' reports showing it owed $84,000, mainly to the IRD.

== History ==
Founder Murray Farquhar launched WildTomato as a 16-page local magazine in Nelson, New Zealand, in July 2006, aiming to create an "essential lifestyle magazine" for the Nelson region. His initial plan was for a weekly printed magazine, before the magazine eventually shifted to a larger monthly publication. The magazine targets a readership of people aged 30-plus in the middle-to-upper socio-economic groups.

The current majority owner of the magazine is Jack Martin who is an immigrant to Nelson from the United Kingdom. He initially became editor of WildTomato in December 2007. Martin oversaw a substantial evolution in the scope, size, print quality, and regional coverage of the magazine, which is published as an 80-plus-page, glossy magazine. In March 2008, Martin began the process to buy WildTomato from Farquhar, eventually completing the sale in September 2008.

In November 2009, WildTomato changed formats, becoming a standard-sized, 100-page magazine, shifting from its traditional oversized saddle-stitched format. The magazine's website was also revamped in 2009.

In April 2016, Lynda Papesch (née Munden/Hooper) was appointed editor when Martin returned to the UK. Papesch comes from a journalistic background, starting her career at The Daily Post in Rotorua in 1977, then moving to The Marlborough Express in 1980. After stints as chief reporter, deputy editor, and acting editor with The Express, Papesch moved to Nelson Tasman in 2006 and started her own media company. She joined the advertising features department of The Nelson Mail, co-ordinating features from 2010 to 2014. In February 2021, Martin put WildTomato into liquation, failing to pay monies owing to staff and blaming Covid-19. The masthead was acquired by the Nelson Magazine, and WildTomato has not been published since.(Source: Lynda Papesch)

== Community involvement ==
The magazine is involved in its local communities, sponsoring and otherwise being involved in several events including featuring several on a monthly basis in its "Snapped" pages, and creating the annual reader-voted Dine Out Awards to highlight Top of the South food, wine, and hospitality. The magazine is further entwined with its local regions by using local writers and photographers as its contributors.

== Content ==
The content of WildTomato reflects the neighbouring regions it covers.

=== Interviews ===
WildTomato regularly features themed interviews on a monthly basis, with a specific emphasis on individuals strongly connected to the Top of the South region; past interviewees include Golden Bay muralist Chris Finlayson, motocross rider Josh Coppins, Tall Blacks basketball coach Nenad Vucinic, author Marguerite van Geldermalsen, children's educational DVD creator Emma Heke, and NZ Open surfing champion Angie Koops.

=== Food, fashion, and health ===
As a lifestyle magazine, some content is also devoted to food, drink, fashion and health. Fashion also features, with images sometimes shot by English lifestyle photographer Daniel Allen.

=== Use of images ===
WildTomato is image-centric, and uses large photos – as Martin believes quality photos are crucial to any magazine.
