= Groom Creek =

River in New Zealand

Coordinates: 41°18′S 173°19′E

Groom Creek, which flows northwards from Fringed Hill then past Tantragee Saddle, is a tributary of the Maitai / Mahitahi River in Nelson, South Island, New Zealand.

A 2018 project to recreate a wetland at the confluence of Groom Creek and the Maitai River was carried out by community volunteers and the Nelson City Council as part of Project Maitai, a Nelson City Council initiative to improve the health of the Maitai River and all its tributaries.
