= Paul Brydon (footballer) =

New Zealand footballer

Personal information
- Full name: Paul Richard Brydon
- Place of birth: New Zealand
- Position: Midfielder

Senior career*
Years	Team	Apps	(Gls)
?–1987	Nelson United		
1988–?	Papatoetoe		

International career
1986	New Zealand	1	(0)
- * Club domestic league appearances and goals

Paul Richard Brydon is a former association football player who represented New Zealand at international level.

Brydon attended Nelson College from 1977 to 1980, playing for both the 1st XI cricket and football teams in 1979 and 1980.

Brydon made a solitary official international appearance for New Zealand in a 4–2 win over Fiji on 17 September 1986.
