= List of shipwrecks in September 1863 =

The list of shipwrecks in September 1863 includes ships sunk, foundered, grounded, or otherwise lost during September 1863.

== 1 September ==
List of shipwrecks: 1 September 1863
Ship	State	Description
Rinaldo	Confederate States of America	American Civil War: The steamer was captured and burned at Trinity, Louisiana, by troops of the 17th Wisconsin Volunteer Infantry Regiment (Union Army).
Vigilant	United Kingdom	The tug was driven ashore and sank in Loch Ryan.

== 2 September ==
List of shipwrecks: 2 September 1863
Ship	State	Description
Paolina	United Kingdom	The barque ran aground on the Cross Sand, in the North Sea off the coast of Norfolk. She was on a voyage from Poti, Russia to Granton, Lothian. She was refloated and resumed her voyage.
Parana	United Kingdom	The ship was captured by pirates off the Ladrones Islands, China. The ship was plundered, her crew confined below decks, the hatches were battened down and the ship was set afire. She sank, killing all hands. Parana was on a voyage from Hong Kong to Falmouth, Cornwall.

== 3 September ==
List of shipwrecks: 3 September 1863
Ship	State	Description
Baron Osy	Belgium	The paddle steamer struck a submerged object and sank in the River Thames at Limehouse, Middlesex. All on board were rescued by the steamship Naiad (United Kingdom). Baron Osy was on a voyage from Antwerp to London, United Kingdom. She had been refloated by 18 September and placed under repair.
Commerce	Norway	The brig was driven ashore in Rence Bay, Denmark. She was on a voyage from Memel, Prussia to London. She was refloated the next day and resumed her voyage.
Eclipse	United Kingdom	The barque ran aground on the Shipwash Sand, in the North Sea off the coast of Suffolk. She was on a voyage from Hartlepool, County Durham to Genoa, Italy. She was refloated with the assistance of three smacks and assisted in to Harwich, Essex in a leaky condition.
HMS Lively	Royal Navy	The Albacore-class gunboat ran aground at Berwick upon Tweed, Northumberland.
383	United Kingdom	The fishing coble capsized in the North Sea off the coast of Yorkshire. Her three crew were rescued by another fishing coble. She was subsequently taken in to Whitby, Yorkshire.

== 4 September ==
List of shipwrecks: 4 September 1863
Ship	State	Description
Delaware	United Kingdom	The brigantine was driven onshore by a gale near Pepin Island, to the north of Nelson, New Zealand. The crew were saved by the efforts of a group of five local Māori, four men and one woman. The group became heroes, especially the woman, Huria Matenga (Julia Martin), who became known as "the Grace Darling of New Zealand". The site of the wreck is now known as Delaware Bay.
George Duskee	United Kingdom	The brig ran aground at Cardiff, Glamorgan. She was on a voyage from Saint John, New Brunswick, British North America to Cardiff.
Pojat	France	The schooner sprang a leak and was beached at Stege, Denmark. She was on a voyage from Hull, Yorkshire, United Kingdom to Helsinki, Grand Duchy of Finland.
Sarah Maria	United Kingdom	The ship departed from Singapore, Straits Settlements for Macao, China. No further trace, presumed foundered with the loss of all hands.
Stokers	United Kingdom	The tug struck the Half Tide Rock, off the Horse Isle and sank. She was on a voyage from Troon, Ayrshire to Greenock, Renfrewshire.

== 5 September ==
List of shipwrecks: 5 September 1863
Ship	State	Description
St. Nicholas	France	The chasse-marée struck the Shingles, off the Isle of Wight, United Kingdom. She was consequently beached near the Hurst Spit, Hampshire, United Kingdom. She was later refloated with assistance from the sailing barge Fanny (United Kingdom) and assisted in to Portsmouth, Hampshire in a severely leaky condition.
HMS Vesuvious	Royal Navy	The Stromboli-class sloop was driven ashore on the coast of Labrador, British North America. She was refloated.

== 6 September ==
List of shipwrecks: 6 September 1863
Ship	State	Description
Anderson	United States	The steamship was driven ashore at Absecon, New Jersey. She was on a voyage from Lisbon, Portugal to New York.
Bucephalus	United Kingdom	The ship was severely damaged by fire off the Tuskar Rock. She was on a voyage from New York to Liverpool, Lancashire.
Captain Cook	United Kingdom	The collier, a brig, foundered in the North Sea off the coast of Norway with the loss of all nine hands. She was on a voyage from North Shields, Northumberland to Hamburg.
Emblem	United Kingdom	The brig was wrecked on the Cobbler Grounds, in the Baltic Sea. She was on a voyage from Sunderland, County Durham to Kronstadt, Russia. Emblem was discovered abandoned and derelict on 8 September and was taken in to Fredrikshavn, Denmark.
Silome	United Kingdom	The barque ran aground on the Longsand, in the North Sea off the coast of Essex. She was on a voyage from Sunderland, County Durham to Hong Kong. She was refloated and taken towed in to Gravesend, Kent.

== 7 September ==
List of shipwrecks: 7 September 1863
Ship	State	Description
Alcyon	United Kingdom	The ship broke from her moorings and drove ashore in the River Lune. She was on a voyage from Quebec City, Province of Canada, British North America to Glasson Dock, Lancashire. She was refloated on 13 September and taken in to Lancaster, Lancashire in a severely leaky condition.
Alert	United Kingdom	The ship was driven ashore and wrecked near Cockburnspath, Berwickshire. The sole crew member on board was rescued. She was on a voyage from Saint Andrews, Fife to Newcastle upon Tyne, Northumberland.
Apollo	United Kingdom	The ship ran aground at Lowestoft, Suffolk. She was on a voyage from South Shields, County Durham to London. She was refloated and taken in to Lowestoft.
Dosset	France	The schooner was driven ashore and wrecked near Merlimont, Pas-de-Calais.
Duke	United Kingdom	The schooner was driven ashore at Fleetwood, Lancashire. She was on a voyage from Ardrossan, Ayrshire to Runcorn, Cheshire. She was refloated.
Duodecimus	United Kingdom	The barque was driven ashore and wrecked on Malta. She was on a voyage from Cardiff, Glamorgan to Malta.
Elvira	Hamburg	The barque collided with the steamship Ocean King (United Kingdom) and foundered in the English Channel 3 nautical miles (5.6 km) off Dungeness, Kent, United Kingdom with the loss of four of her ten crew. Survivors were rescued by the brig Remora (France). Elvira was on a voyage from Jamaica to Hamburg.
Hebe	United Kingdom	The ship was abandoned in the North Sea. Her crew were rescued. She was on a voyage from South Shields to Dordrecht, South Holland, Netherlands. She was subsequently wrecked on the Dutch coast.
Jura	United Kingdom	The steamship ran aground in the Clyde. Her passengers were taken off.
Louise Amalie	Sweden	The ship was driven ashore near "Cronsberg", Denmark. She was on a voyage from Gamla Carleby to London, United Kingdom. She was refloated and taken in to Helsingør, Denmark in a leaky condition.
Margaret Littlejohn	United Kingdom	The ship ran aground at Dundee, Forfarshire. She was on a voyage from Sunderland, County Durham to Dundee. She was refloated and taken in to Dundee.
Maria Magdalena	Hamburg	The barque foundered in the North Sea with the loss of one of her eleven crew. She was on a voyage from Hamburg to Hartlepool, County Durham.
Thomas and Alice	United Kingdom	The schooner was driven ashore at Goswick, Northumberland. She was on a voyage from Berwick upon Tweed to Newcastle upon Tyne. She was refloated.
Veleda	United Kingdom	The barque was driven ashore at Sunderland. She was refloated and towed in to Scarborough, Yorkshire.
Wanderer	United Kingdom	The ship was driven ashore at the South Pier, Londonderry. Her crew were rescued. She was on a voyage from Troon, Ayrshire to Portrush, County Antrim.

== 8 September ==
List of shipwrecks: 8 September 1863
Ship	State	Description
USS Clifton	United States Navy	American Civil War, Second Battle of Sabine Pass: The sidewheel paddle steamer ran aground in the Sabine Pass on the coast of Texas, Confederate States of America under intense Confederate artillery fire. She surrendered, and the Confederates refloated and repaired her and placed her in service with the Texas Marine Department.
Clio	United Kingdom	The ship sprang a leak and foundered in the North Sea off Heligoland. Her crew took to a boat; they were rescued by the schooner Elizabeth and Roberta (Kingdom of Hanover). Clio was on a voyage from Seaham, County Durham to Hamburg.
Emily	United Kingdom	The barque was abandoned on the Dogger Bank. Her crew were rescued. by a Dutch vessel. She was discovered derelict in the North Sea by the fishing vessel Doggerbank (Netherlands). Emily was on a voyage from Vyborg, Grand Duchy of Finland to Grimsby, Lincolnshire. She was taken in to Grimsby, where she arrived on 11 September.
George and James	United Kingdom	The brig was abandoned in the North Sea 200 nautical miles (370 km) off Flamborough Head, Yorkshire. Her eight crew were rescued by Cobourg (United Kingdom) and another vessel. She was on a voyage from Vyborg, Grand Duchy of Finland to Grimsby and/or Hull, Yorkshire. She was discovered the next day and taken in to Delfzijl, Groningen, Netherlands.
Grange	United Kingdom	The brig ran aground at Leith, Lothian. She was on a voyage from Quebec City, Province of Canada, British North America to Grangemouth, Stirlingshire. She was refloated.
Haabet	Norway	The ship foundered in the North Sea. Her crew were rescued by Vulcan (United Kingdom). Haabet was on a voyage from Sunderland, County Durham, United Kingdom to Christiania.
Jacatra	United Kingdom	The ship departed from Singapore, Straits Settlements for Hong Kong. No further trace, presumed foundered with the loss of all hands.
Jessie	United States	The schooner was wrecked near Miragoâne, Haiti. She was on a voyage from the Rio Grande to New York.
Jonge Cornelius	Flag unknown	The ship foundered in the North Sea. Her crew were rescued by Franz (Flag unknown).
Mary	United Kingdom	The schooner was driven ashore at "Raa", Denmark. She was on a voyage from Fraserburgh, Aberdeenshire to Stettin. She was refloated then next day and taken in to Helsingør, Denmark.
Monarch	United Kingdom	The brig sprang a leak in the North Sea. She was abandoned the next day. Her crew were rescued by Lancet (United Kingdom). Monarch was on a voyage from Riga, Russia to London.
Norma	Norway	The barque was abandoned in the North Sea. She was on a voyage from Dram to London. She subsequently ran aground between Baltrum and Norderney, Kingdom of Hanover.
Ravensdale	United Kingdom	The ship struck the Hendon Rock, off the coast of County Durham. She was on a voyage from Quebec City to Sunderland. She was taken in to Sunderland in a severely leaky condition.
Signet	United Kingdom	The ship foundered in the North Sea. Her crew were rescued. She was on a voyage from the River Wear to Honfleur, Calvados, France.
Sir William Chaytor	United Kingdom	The collier, a brig, was wrecked on Sylt, Duchy of Holstein. Her crew were rescued. She was on a voyage from Hamburg to South Shields, County Durham.
Wilhelmina Adriana	Flag unknown	The ship was abandoned in the North Sea. Her crew were rescued by Lintus (United Kingdom). Wilhelmina Adriana was on a voyage from Newcastle upon Tyne, Northumberland, United Kingdom to Lisbon, Portugal. Later that day, she was discovered derelict. She was taken in to Great Yarmouth, Norfolk, United Kingdom, where she arrived on 11 September.

== 9 September ==
List of shipwrecks: 9 September 1863
Ship	State	Description
Adelheid	Prussia	The brig ran aground on the Newcombe Sand, in the North Sea off the coast of Suffolk, United Kingdom. she was on a voyage from Stettin to Havre de Grâce, Seine-Inférieure, France. She was refloated and taken in to Lowestoft, Suffolk.
Anna Johanna	Denmark	The galiot was abandoned in the North Sea. She was on a voyage from Danzig to West Hartlepool, County Durham, United Kingdom.
Beau Uama	United Kingdom	The ship ran aground in the Hooghly River. She was on a voyage from Calcutta India to Mauritius.
Concordia	Italy	The full-rigged ship was driven ashore at Cape Cornwall, Cornwall, United Kingdom. She was on a voyage from Taganrog, Russia to Bristol, Gloucestershire, United Kingdom. She was refloated the next day and taken in to Penzance, Cornwall in a severely leaky condition.
D. E. Crary	Confederate States Navy	The 109-ton screw steamer was stranded.
Glen Isla	United Kingdom	The ship ran aground in the Hooghly River. She was on a voyage from Calcutta to Hong Kong. She was refloated and resumed her voyage.
Johannes	Kingdom of Hanover	The koff was driven ashore on Sylt, Duchy of Holstein. She was on a voyage from Hartlepool, County Durham to Leer.
Lion	United Kingdom	The ship was abandoned off the Tiller, in the North Sea. Her crew were rescued by Elizabeth and Robert (United Kingdom). Lion was on a voyage from Seaham, County Durham to Hamburg.
CSS Pontchartrain	Confederate States Navy	American Civil War: The sidewheel armored gunboat was burned by Confederate forces on the Arkansas River at Little Rock, Arkansas, to prevent her capture by Union forces. The sidewheel steamer USS General Price (United States Navy) completed her destruction on 10 September.
Princess Louise	United Kingdom	The ship was wrecked at Thisted, Denmark. Her crew were rescued. She was on a voyage from a port in Devon to London.
Rose	United Kingdom	The ship was driven ashore on Saaremaa, Russia. She was on a voyage from Sunderland, County Durham to Kronstadt, Russia.
Rosina	Malta	The brig was wrecked at La Calle, Algeria. She was on a voyage from La Calle to Naples, Italy.
Wodan	United Kingdom	The ship departed from New York for Queenstown, County Cork. No further trace, presumed foundered with the loss of all hands.

== 10 September ==
List of shipwrecks: 10 September 1863
Ship	State	Description
Arkansas	Confederate States of America	American Civil War: The 223-ton sternwheel paddle steamer was burned by the Confederates on the Arkansas River at Little Rock, Arkansas, to prevent her capture by Union forces.
Arthur	Prussia	The brig was driven ashore and wrecked near Hirtshals, Denmark. Her crew were rescued. She was on a voyage from Sutton Bridge, Lincolnshire, United Kingdom to Memel.
Bracelet	Confederate States of America	American Civil War: The 169-ton sidewheel paddle steamer was burned by the Confederates on the Arkansas River at Little Rock, Arkansas, to prevent her capture by Union forces. Her wreck was removed in 1906 by the snagboat C. B. Reaves (United States).
Chester Ashley	Confederate States of America	American Civil War: The 192-ton sternwheel paddle steamer was burned by the Confederates on the Arkansas River at Little Rock to prevent her capture by Union forces.
Highland Lassie	(United Kingdom of Great Britain and Ireland) New Zealand	The 160-ton brig was wrecked on a sandspit inside the mouth of the New River while en route from Port Chalmers to Invercargill, New Zealand.
Julia Roane	Confederate States of America	American Civil War: The sternwheel paddle steamer was burned by the Confederates on the Arkansas River at Little Rock to prevent her capture by Union forces.
Little Rock	Confederate States of America	American Civil War: The 183-ton sternwheel paddle steamer was burned by the Confederates on the Arkansas River at Little Rock to prevent her capture by Union forces.
Maori	(United Kingdom of Great Britain and Ireland) New South Wales	The barque was wrecked. She was on a voyage from Newcastle to Melbourne, Victoria.
Sovereign	(United Kingdom of Great Britain and Ireland) Jersey	The sloop ran aground on Laltholmen, Denmark. She was on a voyage from Stettin to Hartlepool, County Durham. She was refloated and taken in to Copenhagen, Denmark.
St. Francis No. 3	Confederate States of America	[merican Civil War: The sidewheel paddle steamer was burned by the Confederates on the Arkansas River at Little Rock to prevent her capture by Union forces.
Tahlequah	Confederate States of America	American Civil War: The 92-ton sidewheel paddle steamer was burned by the Confederates on the Arkansas River at Little Rock to prevent her capture by Union forces.
Walpas	United Kingdom	The brig was discovered abandoned and derelict in the North Sea (56°12′N 4°05′E) by the schooner Frederick (United Kingdom). Three crew were put aboard and she was takne in to London.
Wild Dayrell	United Kingdom	The ship was damaged by fire at Shoreham-by-Sea, Sussex. She was on a voyage from Quebec City, Province of Canada, British North America to Shoreham-by-Sea.

== 11 September ==
List of shipwrecks: 11 September 1863
Ship	State	Description
Albion	United Kingdom	The smack ran aground on the Cann Rock. She was on a voyage from Troon, Ayrshire to Cowes, Isle of Wight. She was refloated the next day and resumed her voyage.
Copse	United Kingdom	The ship ran aground at Whitby, Yorkshire. She was on a voyage from Quebec City, Province of Canada, British North America to Whitby.
Driver	United Kingdom	The schooner collided with Henriette (Norway) and was abandoned by her crew. She was on a voyage from Stettin to Leith, Lothian. She was subsequently boarded by some of the crew of Henriette and taken in to Tønsberg, Norway.
Ellergill	United Kingdom	The ship ran aground in the River Tweed. She was on a voyage from Quebec City to Berwick upon Tweed, Northumberland.
Three Brothers	United Kingdom	The ship ran aground in the Hilbre Islands, Cheshire.
Zealand	United Kingdom	The steamship was abandoned in the North Sea by seven of the fourteen people on board, who considered the ship to be sinking. They were rescued by the sloop Elise (Norway). Zealand was subsequently abandoned; those on board were rescued by the barque Christina (Norway). Zealand sank 4 Danish miles (30.13 km) off Thisted, Denmark. She was on a voyage from Königsberg, Prussia to London.

== 12 September ==
List of shipwrecks: 12 September 1863
Ship	State	Description
Dancing Sally	United Kingdom	The ship was wrecked at Hvidbjerg, Denmark with the loss of two of her ten crew. She was on a voyage from Riga, Russia to London.
Diurnal	United States	The 199-ton sidewheel paddle steamer struck a snag and burned on the White River at St. Charles, Arkansas.
Fox	Confederate States of America	American Civil War, Union blockade: The steamer, a blockade runner, was destroyed by her own crew at Pascagoula, Mississippi, to prevent her capture by the sidewheel paddle steamer USS Genesee (United States Navy).
Gem	United Kingdom	The ship was driven ashore near Brielle, South Holland, Netherlands. She was on a voyage from Lübeck to Rotterdam, South Holland. She was refloated and resumed her voyage.
Lord Nelson	United Kingdom	The schooner sank off Westkapelle, Zeeland, Netherlands with the loss of her captain. She was on a voyage from Antwerp, Belgium to Rouen, Seine-Inférieure, France.
Pilot	United Kingdom	The schooner struck the Goldstone Rock, in the North Sea off the coast of Northumberland. She was on a voyage from Sunderland, County Durham to Dundee, Forfarshire. She was assisted in to Lindisfarne, Northumberland in a severely leaky condition.

== 13 September ==
List of shipwrecks: 13 September 1863
Ship	State	Description
Adrian	United Kingdom	The barque ran aground in the Castletown River. She was on a voyage from Sulina, Ottoman Empire to Dundalk, County Louth. She was refloated on 15 September and taken in to Dundalk.
Bowes	United Kingdom	The ship was abandoned on the Dogger Bank. She was on a voyage from Vyborg, Grand Duchy of Finland to London. She was subsequently taken in to Hellevoetsluis, Zeeland, Netherlands.
Carnatic	United Kingdom	The ship ran aground at South Shields, County Durham. She was on a voyage from Quebec City, Province of Canada, British North America to South Shields.
Crosby	United Kingdom	The schooner ran aground on the Barnard Sand, in the North Sea off the coast of Norfolk. She was on a voyage from Porto, Portugal. She was refloated and taken in to Great Yarmouth, Norfolk in a leaky condition.
Hiawatha	United States	American Civil War: The 767-ton sidewheel paddle steamer was burned on the Mississippi River at St. Louis, Missouri, in a fire set by Confederate agents.
Imperial	United States	American Civil War: The 907-ton sidewheel paddle steamer, in use as a hospital boat, was burned on the Mississippi River at St. Louis, Missouri in a fire set by Confederate agents.
Jessie K. Bell	United States	American Civil War: The 325-ton sidewheel paddle steamer was burned on the Mississippi River at St. Louis, Missouri in a fire set by Confederate agents.
Jupiter	United Kingdom	American Civil War, Union blockade: The blockade runner was aground in Wassaw Sound on the coast of Georgia, Confederate States of America when the gunboat USS Cimarron (United States Navy) discovered her. After Jupiter′s crew failed in their attempts to scuttle her, Cimarron captured her.
Marie	France	The schooner collided with the Newarp Lightship ( Trinity House) and was abandoned by fourteen of her sixteen crew, who got aboard the lightship. Marie was on a voyage from Iceland to Dunkirk, Nord. She arrived at Dunkirk the next day.
Neptune	United Kingdom	The barque was wrecked near "Gronhol", Denmark. She was on a voyage from Leith, Lothian to Kronstadt, Russia.
Niger	United Kingdom	The ship struck the Hendon Rock and was consequently beached at Sunderland, County Durham. She was on a voyage from Quebec City, Province of Canada, British North America to Sunderland. She was refloated the next day and taken in to Sunderland.
Perseverance	United Kingdom	The schooner ran aground on the Patch Sand, in the North Sea of the coast of Norfolk. She was on a voyage from Hartlepool, County Durham to Dover, Kent.
Post Boy	United States	American Civil War: The 348-ton sidewheel paddle steamer was burned on the Mississippi River at St. Louis, Missouri in a fire set by Confederate agents.
Sophie	Norway	The brig was driven ashore and damaged at Höganäs, Sweden. Her crew were rescued. She was on a voyage from Newcastle upon Tyne, Northumberland, United Kingdom to Copenhagen, Denmark. She was later refloated and taken in to Helsingør, Denmark for repairs.
Symmetry	United Kingdom	The schooner sank off the Point of Ayre, Isle of Man.
Wilhelm	Stettin	The schooner was driven ashore and wrecked near Blokhus, Denmark. Her crew were rescued. She was on a voyage from Stettin to Grimsby, Lincolnshire, United Kingdom.

== 14 September ==
List of shipwrecks: 14 September 1863
Ship	State	Description
Concordia	Denmark	The brig was driven ashore at Zoutelande, Zeeland, Netherlands. She was on a voyage from Flensburg, Duchy of Holstein to Leith, Lothian, United Kingdom. She was refloated on 17 September and taken in to Vlissingen, Zeeland.
John James	United Kingdom	The schooner was driven ashore east of Calais, France. She was on a voyage from Hartlepool, County Durham to Porto, Portugal. She was refloated and resumed her voyage.
Leda	United Kingdom	The ship ran aground on the Cockle Sand, in the North Sea off the coast of Norfolk. She was refloated and taken in to Great Yarmouth.
Louisiana	Norway	The ship was abandoned in the Atlantic Ocean (46°26′N 61°31′W). Her crew were rescued by N. C. Carboe (Denmark). Louisiana was on a voyage from New York, United States to Antwerp, Belgium.
Spirit	Flag unknown	The brigantine sank in the Atlantic Ocean off Maranhão, Brazil, with the loss of all but three of her crew. She was on a voyage from London to Rio de Janeiro, Brazil.
HMS Vesuvius	Royal Navy	The Stromboli-class sloop was driven ashore on the coast of Labrador, British North America. She was refloated, repaired and returned to service.

== 15 September ==
List of shipwrecks: 15 September 1863
Ship	State	Description
Arabian	United Kingdom	American Civil War, Union blockade: Carrying a cargo of cotton, the 263-register ton sidewheel paddle steamer was wrecked on the coast of North Carolina, Confederate States of America at the entrance to the Cape Fear River at Kure Beach north of Corncake Inlet, about 1 nautical mile (1.9 km) below Fort Fisher, after being turned back by the screw steamer USS Iron Age and screw sloop USS Shenandoah (both United States Navy) while trying to exit the Cape Fear River at night.
Emma	United Kingdom	The ship was wrecked in British North America. Her crew survived. She was on a voyage from Quebec City, Province of Canada, British North America to Liverpool, Lancashire.
Gertruidis	Spain	The schooner was wrecked in the Monarch Islands, Orkney Islands with the loss of all hands, at least four lives.
Kerr	United Kingdom	The ship sprang a leak and was beached at Lowestoft, Suffolk. She was on a voyage from the River Wear to Alicante, Spain.
Monte Christo	Flag unknown	The ship was lost whilst on a voyage from Paraíba, Brazil to Cayenne, French Guiana.
Princess Victoria	United Kingdom	The ship ran aground and capsized at Lymington, Hampshire. She was on a voyage from Sunderland, County Durham to Lymington.
Salcombe Castle	unknown	The schooner was wrecked near Hokianga in New Zealand's North Island while en route from Lyttelton to Kaipara Harbour, striking the shore during a gale and heavy swell. All eight on board were saved.
Sophie	Norway	The brig was driven ashore at Höganäs, Sweden. Her crew were rescued. She was on a voyage from Newcastle upon Tyne, Northumberland, United Kingdom to Copenhagen, Denmark.
Unknown	Unknown	American Civil War: The steamer, reportedly French flagged, was burned at dock in Bayport, Florida to prevent capture by James Battle (United States Navy).
Viceroy	(United Kingdom of Great Britain and Ireland) British North America	The full-rigged ship foundered in the Atlantic Ocean (51°00′N 11°40′W). Her 35 crew were rescued by John Henry (United States). Viceroy was on a voyage from London to Prince Edward Island and/or Quebec City, Province of Canada.

== 16 September ==
List of shipwrecks: 16 September 1863
Ship	State	Description
Barbara Campbell, and Irishman	United Kingdom	The West Indiaman barque Barbara Campbell collided with the steamship Irishman off the coast of County Down with the loss of a crew member. Survivors were rescued by, and she was taken in tow by, the steamship Duke of Cambridge (United Kingdom) but consequently foundered. She was on a voyage from Grenada to Greenock, Renfrewshire. Irishman was on a voyage from Glasgow, Renfrewshire to Dublin. She sank at Ardglass.
Dorothea	United Kingdom	The brig capsized in the River Wear during a squall. She was righted.
Eleanor and Jane	United Kingdom	The ship was wrecked on Guernsey, Channel Islands. Her crew were rescued by Mary Ellen (United Kingdom).
Glasgow	United Kingdom	The barque was abandoned in the Atlantic Ocean. Her crew were rescued. She was on a voyage from Quebec City, Province of Canada, British North America to Liverpool, Lancashire.
Jane Glasson	United Kingdom	The ship was driven ashore and wrecked on Anticosti Island, Nova Scotia, British North America. Her crew were rescued. She was on a voyage from Leith, Lothian to Quebec City.
Philo Stevenson	United Kingdom	The ship departed from Montreal, Province of Canada for Queenstown, County Cork. No further trace, presumed foundered with the loss of all hands.

== 17 September ==
List of shipwrecks: 17 September 1863
Ship	State	Description
Anna Hall	United Kingdom	The ship was abandoned in the Atlantic Ocean. Her crew were rescued by Euxine (United Kingdom). Anna Hall was on a voyage from Waterford to Richibucto, New Brunswick, British North America.
Electra	United Kingdom	The full-rigged ship struck the quayside at Woosung, China and sank. She was on a voyage from Newcastle, New South Wales to Woosung.
Gipsy Bride	United Kingdom	The clipper was wrecked on the Scarborough Shoal, in the South China Sea. All on board took to six boats; those in two boats were reported missing. She was on a voyage from Manila, Spanish East Indies to Singapore, Straits Settlements.
Sharon	United Kingdom	The schooner departed from Liverpool, Lancashire for Harbour Grace, Newfoundland, British North America. No further trace, presumed foundered with the loss of all hands.

== 18 September ==
List of shipwrecks: 18 September 1863
Ship	State	Description
Belford	United Kingdom	The schooner was run down and sunk in the North Sea off Tynemouth, Northumberland by the steamship Europa (Italy). Her five crew were rescued. She was on a voyage from Sunderland, County Durham to Dundee, Forfarshire.
Bigarena	Flag unknown	The ship was wrecked at Mistaken Point, Newfoundland, British North America. She was on a voyage from Mayaguez, Puerto Rico to Saint John's, Newfoundland.
Ganges	United Kingdom	The barque was wrecked near Cushendun, County Antrim. Her crew were rescued by the Coast Guard. She was on a voyage from Stranraer, Wigtownshire to Saint John's, Newfoundland and/or Quebec City, Province of Canada, British North America.
Jane	United Kingdom	The ship was run down and sunk off Cape Clear Island, County Cork by Great Eastern (United Kingdom) with the loss of two of her 22 crew. Survivors were rescued by Great Eastern. Jane was on a voyage from Liverpool, Lancashire to Quebec City.
Mimosa	United Kingdom	The ship was wrecked on the coast of Australia with the loss of two lives.

== 19 September ==
List of shipwrecks: 19 September 1863
Ship	State	Description
King of Trumps	United Kingdom	The ship capsized and sank at Quebec City, Province of Canada, British North America. She had been refloated by 3 October.
Manhasset	United States	American Civil War: The coal schooner was driven ashore and wrecked by a gale 7 nautical miles (13 km) southwest of Sabine Pass, Texas, Confederate States of America.Confederate forces captured her wreck.
Mary Agnes	United Kingdom	The Mersey Flat collided with Snaefell ( (United Kingdom of Great Britain and Ireland) Isle of Man) and sank at Liverpool, Lancashire with the loss of three lives. Survivors were rescued by HMS Warrior (Royal Navy).
Octa	United Kingdom	The steamship was driven ashore on Gotland, Sweden. She was on a voyage from Saint Petersburg, Russia to London. She had been refloated by 21 September and resumed her voyage.
Robert Ingham	United Kingdom	The brig was driven ashore at Briton Ferry, Glamorgan. She was being towed from Port Talbot to Swansea.
Triton	Kingdom of Hanover	The schooner was driven ashore at Peterhead, Aberdeenshire, United Kingdom. Her five crew were rescued by rocket apparatus. She was on a voyage from Arkhangelsk, Russia to Peterhead.
William Sturgis	United Kingdom	The ship was wrecked on the Otters Bank, in the Atlantic Ocean off the coast of New York. She was on a voyage from Cardiff, Glamorgan to Iloilo, Spanish East Indies.

== 20 September ==
List of shipwrecks: 20 September 1863
Ship	State	Description
Borland	United Kingdom	The ship was wrecked in the Gulf of Mexico.
Edmond	United Kingdom	The ship was wrecked in the Gulf of Mexico.
Fanny Mitcheson	United Kingdom	The ship was wrecked in the Gulf of Mexico.
Floreville	United Kingdom	The ship ran aground on the Barber Sand, in the North Sea off the coast of Norfolk. She was on a voyage from Hartlepool, County Durham to London. She was refloated and resumed her voyage.
Hector	United Kingdom	The ship was wrecked in the Gulf of Mexico.
J. K. L.	United Kingdom	The barque was wrecked in the Gulf of Mexico with the loss of fourteen of her nineteen crew.
John Howell	United Kingdom	The full-rigged ship was wrecked in the Gulf of Mexico with the loss of twelve of her crew. There were at least three survivors.
Maria	United Kingdom	The ship was wrecked in the Gulf of Mexico.
Mary Hall	United Kingdom	The barque was damaged by fire at Dundee, Forfarshire.
Prince Alfred	(United Kingdom of Great Britain and Ireland) New Zealand	The paddle steamer was lost at Wanganui.
St. Lawrence	United Kingdom	The barque ran aground on the Salthouse Bank, in the Irish Sea off Southport, Lancashire. Fourteen of the nineteen people on board were taken off by the Southport Lifeboat. She was on a voyage from Liverpool, Lancashire to Cardiff, Glamorgan. She was subsequently abandoned. St. Lawrence was later refloated with assistance from the Lytham Lifeboat and taken in to Lytham St. Annes, Lancashire.

== 21 September ==
List of shipwrecks: 21 September 1863
Ship	State	Description
Christina	Italy	The barque was struck by lightning at Greytown, New Zealand. She was on a voyage from Greytown to Genoa. She was consequently condemned.
Scurf	United Kingdom	The ship was driven ashore in the Larne Lough. She was on a voyage from Maryport, Cumberland to Sligo. She was refloated.
Sea King	United States	The full-rigged ship foundered in a hurricane with the loss of all but one of her crew. The survivor was rescued by Eugenie (Hamburg). Sea King was on a voyage from San Francisco, California to Liverpool, Lancashire, United Kingdom.

== 22 September ==
List of shipwrecks: 22 September 1863
Ship	State	Description
Lemuel	United Kingdom	The ship foundered in the Mediterranean Sea off Cape Matapan, Greece. Her crew were rescued by Solon (Norway). Lemuel was on a voyage from Odesa to Cork.
Unidentified vessel	Flag unknown	American Civil War, Union blockade: The vessel was chased ashore near the mouth of Caney Creek near Velasco, Texas, Confederate States of America, by a United States Navy armed schooner. Her crew burned her to prevent her capture by Union forces.

== 23 September ==
List of shipwrecks: 23 September 1863
Ship	State	Description
Alliance	United States	American Civil War, Union blockade: The schooner, captured by a Confederate States Navy small boat expedition on 19 September while carrying a cargo of sutler′s stores during a voyage to Port Royal, South Carolina, ran aground in Old Haven Creek or Milford Haven, Virginia, Confederate States of America while under the control of a Confederate prize crew and was burned by the Confederates after the gunboat USS Thomas Freeborn (United States Navy) opened fire on her.
Cairngorm	United Kingdom	The ship was wrecked in the Min River Her crew survived. She was on a voyage from a port in Australia to Foo Chow Foo, China.
Floreville	United Kingdom	The ship sprang a leak and was beached on the Gunfleet Sand, in the North Sea off the coast of Essex. She was on a voyage from Hartlepool, County Durham to London. She was refloated with the assistance of three smacks and assisted in to Harwich, Essex.
Phantom	Confederate States of America	American Civil War, Union blockade: The 500-ton screw steamer, a blockade runner carrying a cargo of arms, gin, whiskey, lead, cannons, rifle muskets, other arms, and other Confederate government stores was chased ashore at Rich Inlet or New Topsail Inlet on the coast of North Carolina by the sidewheel paddle steamer USS Connecticut (United States Navy). Her crew set fire to her and abandoned ship. Confederate sharpshooters killed a U.S. Navy landsman approaching her to attempt to put out the fire, and Connecticut then destroyed her. Her wreck later broke in half after being shelled by U.S. Navy warships.
Seine	United Kingdom	The paddle steamer was run into by the steamship Carron (United Kingdom) in the River Thames at Blackwall, Middlesex. She was consequently beached at East Greenwich, Kent. All on board were rescued by the steamship Naiad (United Kingdom). Seine was on a voyage from a port in France to London.
Unidentified schooner	Confederate States of America	American Civil War, Union blockade: The schooner was run aground at Milford Haven or Old Haven, Virginia then burned to prevent her capture when the armed tugs USS Anacostia and USS Tulip and gunboat USS Thomas Freeborn (all United States Navy) arrived on the scene.

== 24 September ==
List of shipwrecks: 24 September 1863
Ship	State	Description
Asterion	United States	The clipper was wrecked on a reef off Bakers Island, Massachusetts. Her eighteen crew were rescued.
Elizabeth	Confederate States of America	American Civil War, Union blockade: Carrying a military cargo, the 623-to-660-ton sidewheel paddle steamer ran aground on the coast of North Carolina at the east end of Lockwood Folly Inlet and was burned.
La Plata	United Kingdom	The steamship was driven ashore east of Wells-next-the-Sea, Norfolk. She was on a voyage from Goole, Yorkshire to Antwerp, Belgium. She was refloated the next day and put back to Goole for repairs.

== 25 September ==
List of shipwrecks: 25 September 1863
Ship	State	Description
Daring Wave	United Kingdom	The ship was driven ashore on the Fuentes de Tobasco. She was on a voyage from New York City to Liverpool, Lancashire. She was refloated on 13 November and taken in to Minatitlán, Mexico.
Genoa	United Kingdom	The ship was abandoned in the Atlantic Ocean. She was on a voyage from Quebec City, Province of Canada, British North America to Antwerp, Belgium. She was subsequently discovered by another vessel, which put five crew aboard. Genoa was later wrecked on the coast of Scotland.
CSS Grand Duke	Confederate States Navy	An accidental fire destroyed the 508-ton cottonclad sidewheel paddle steamer at Shreveport, Louisiana.

== 26 September ==
List of shipwrecks: 23 September 1863
Ship	State	Description
Earl of Hardwicke	United Kingdom	The ship was driven ashore and wrecked at Port Natal, Cape Colony. All on board were rescued.
Gratitude	United Kingdom	The ship was driven ashore at Wells-next-the-Sea, Norfolk. She was refloated and taken in to Wells-next-the-Sea in a leaky condition.
Ida	Stettin	The ship was driven ashore and wrecked at Hirtshals, Denmark. Her crew were rescued. She was on a voyage from Stettin to Sunderland, County Durham, United Kingdom.
Karla	Bremen	The barque was run into by the steamship Joseph Straker (United Kingdom) and sank off the South Foreland, Kent, United Kingdom. Her crew were rescued. She was on a voyage from Antwerp to Cardiff, Glamorgan, United Kingdom.
Milton	United Kingdom	The ship was wrecked on a reef off Richibucto, New Brunswick, British North America.
Novik (Новик)	Imperial Russian Navy	The Boyarin-class corvette was driven ashore and wrecked during fog 2 nautical miles (3.7 km) north of Point Reyes, California, with the loss of one life. She was on a voyage from Hakodate, Japan to San Francisco, California.
Rising Dawn	United Kingdom	The barque struck the Lurcher Sand, off Yarmouth, Nova Scotia, British North America. She was on a voyage from Saint John, New Brunswick to Leith, Lothian. She was refloated and taken in to Yarmouth in a waterlogged condition. Temporary repairs were made and she sailed for Saint John for permanent repairs.
Sebastian	United Kingdom	The ship was driven ashore and wrecked at Port Natal. All on board were rescued.
Teresita	United Kingdom	The ship was wrecked at Matanzas, Cuba. She was on a voyage from Matanzas to Liverpool, Lancashire.

== 27 September ==
List of shipwrecks: 27 September 1863
Ship	State	Description
Curlew	United Kingdom	The schooner struck the wreck of Lord Yarborough (United Kingdom) and was beached at Donna Nook, Lincolnshire. She was on a voyage from Boston, Lincolnshire to Grangemouth, Stirlingshire. She had become a wreck by 11 October.
John	United Kingdom	The brigantine was driven ashore and wrecked at Porthwaen, Anglesey. Her five crew survived. She was on a voyage from Harrington, Cumberland to Newport, Monmouthshire.
Julius Pringle	Flag unknown	The full-rigged ship was lost at Monterey, California, Confederate States of America with the loss of one life.
Loome	Flag unknown	The ship was lost whilst on a voyage from Paraíba, Brazil to Cayenne, French Guiana.

== 28 September ==
List of shipwrecks: 27 September 1863
Ship	State	Description
Maria	United Kingdom	The schooner was driven ashore at Cloughton Wyke, Yorkshire. She was on a voyage from Newcastle upon Tyne, Northumberland to Caen, Calvados, France. She was refloated and taken in to Scarborough in a leaky condition. Subsequently repaired.
Robert Campbell Jr.	United States	American Civil War: The 421-ton sidewheel paddle steamer burned on the Mississippi River near Milliken's Bend, Louisiana, Confederate States of America with the loss of 22 lives after a Confederate guerrilla posing as a passenger aboard her set her on fire.
Starling	United Kingdom	The ship was driven ashore on Texel, North Holland, Netherlands. She was on a voyage from Amsterdam, North Holland to Liverpool, Lancashire. She was refloated on 2 October and taken in to Amsterdam.
Tyne	United Kingdom	The steamship ran aground in the River Tyne. She was on a voyage from London to the River Tyne. She was refloated.
Vulcan	United Kingdom	The schooner ran aground off Cantie Head, Orkney Islands and was consequently beached in Kirk Bay. She was on a voyage from Newcastle upon Tyne to Loch Carron. She was refloated on 15 October and taken in to Stromness for repairs.
Unidentified schooner	United States	American Civil War, Union blockade: The schooner was burned on Old Haven Creek on the coast of Virginia, Confederate States of America by the gunboat USS Currituck (United States Navy).

== 29 September ==
List of shipwrecks: 29 September 1863
Ship	State	Description
Loyal	United Kingdom	The ship was wrecked at Cayenne, French Guiana. She was on a voyage from Paraíba, Brazil to Cayenne.
Parkins	United Kingdom	The Mersey Flat sank in the River Dee. Her crew were rescued.
Peruvian	United Kingdom	The ship was gutted by fire at Greenock, Renfrewshire during fitting out. Subsequently completed and entered service.
Scinde	United Kingdom	The ship foundered in the Atlantic Ocean (46°42′N 28°10′W). All on board were rescued by the barque Erica (Sweden). Scinde was on a voyage from Cochin, India to London.

== 30 September ==
List of shipwrecks: 30 September 1863
Ship	State	Description
Ann	United Kingdom	The schooner foundered in the Mediterranean Sea (38°44′N 4°02′E). Her crew were rescued by the barque Eliza Kinch (United Kingdom). Ann was on a voyage from Agrigento, Sicily. Italy to Cork or Falmouth, Cornwall.
Clifton	(United Kingdom of Great Britain and Ireland) British North America	The schooner was driven ashore at Spry Harbour, Nova Scotia. She was on a voyage from New York to a port in Newfoundland.
Danube	United Kingdom	The steamship was driven ashore at San Stefano, Ottoman Empire. She was on a voyage from Liverpool, Lancashire to Constantinople, Ottoman Empire. She was refloated the next day and towed in to Constantinople.
Director	United Kingdom	American Civil War, Union blockade: During a blockade-running voyage from Nassau, Bahamas to Peace Creek, Florida, Confederate States of America, with a cargo of rum and salt, the schooner was captured and destroyed as she exited Terraceia Creek at the entrance to the Caloosahatchie River at Punta Rasa, Florida by the barque USS Gem of the Sea (United States Navy).
Doncaster	United Kingdom	The ship was wrecked on the Mallen Rocks, near Arendal, Norway. She was on a voyage from Vyborg, Grand Duchy of Finland to Hartlepool, County Durham. She was refloated on 10 October and taken in to Arendal in a wrecked condition.
Jura	United Kingdom	The steamship was wrecked at Kirkmaiden, Wigtownshire. Her crew were rescued. She was on a voyage from Whitehaven, Cumberland to Bowling, Dunbartonshire.

== Unknown date ==
List of shipwrecks: Unknown date in September 1863
Ship	State	Description
Adelina Eliza	France	The ship was wrecked on a coral reef in the "Southern Ocean". Her fourteen crew survived, but were captured by cannibals. Eleven of them would be killed and eaten over the next five years. Three crew escaped but only one lived to reach the coast of South America on a raft. Adelina Eliza was on a voyage from Bordeaux, Gironde to Hong Kong.
Alfred the Great	United Kingdom	The ship was lost at the mouth of the Rangoon River.
Augusta	United States	The 218-ton sidewheel paddle steamer was stranded at Hell Gate in the East River in New York.
Bertha	Denmark	The sloop was discovered derelict in the North Sea by the brig Eltham (United Kingdom). She was taken in to North Shields, Northumberland.
Blitz	Prussia	The steamship struck the pier at Swinemünde and sank. Her crew were rescued. She was on a voyage from Stettin to Memel. Blitz was refloated on 9 September.
Cama Family	United Kingdom	The ship ran aground in the South China Sea. She was on a voyage from Singapore, Straits Settlements to Hong Kong. She was refloated four days later and put in to Manila, Spanish East Indies on 9 September in a leaky condition.
Caroline	United Kingdom	The ship was wrecked on reefs north east of the Turks Islands before 25 September. She was on a voyage from Glasgow, Renfrewshire to Havana, Cuba.
Catherine Glen	United Kingdom	The ship was lost in the South China Sea. She was on a voyage from Hong Kong to Singapore.
City of Madison	United States	American Civil War: The 419-ton sidewheel paddle steamer exploded on the Mississippi River near Vicksburg, Mississippi, after being set afire by Confederate agents. Reports of the loss of life in the fire and explosion range from 63 to 156 killed.
Dunbar	United Kingdom	The ship was abandoned in the Norwegian Sea. Her crew were rescued by Governor (United Kingdom). Dunbar was on a voyage from Arkhangelsk, Russia to London.
Eliza	United Kingdom	The ship was driven ashore at the Cliff End Fort, Isle of Wight. She was refloated on 15 September and taken in to Yarmouth, Isle of Wight.
Eliza Hayward	United Kingdom	The ship was destroyed by fire.
Esther	Peru	The barque was destroyed by fire at Buenos Aires, Argentina.
Fanny Anne	United Kingdom	The ship struck rocks in the Aran Islands, County Galway and was holed. She was run ashore in Manchester Cove where she was wrecked. Her crew survived. She was on a voyage from Milford Haven, Pembrokeshire to Clifden, County Galway.
Frederick Bruning, or Frederick Brunning	Rostock	The barque was abandoned in the Atlantic Ocean before 27 September. She was on a voyage from New York to Quebec City, Province of Canada, British North America and Fleetwood, Lancashire, United Kingdom. She was discovered derelict by the steamship Palermo (Italy) on 16 February 1864 and was towed in to Queenstown, County Cork, United Kingdom, where she arrived on 19 February.
Frederick Gustav	United Kingdom	The ship was wrecked on the Antioche Rock, off the Île d'Oléron, Charente-Inférieure before 22 September. She was on a voyage from Bordeaux, Gironde to Liverpool, Lancashire.
George Sand	United States	The ship was wrecked on the Prata Shoals, in the South China Sea. She was on a voyage from San Francisco, California to Hong Kong.
Harmonica	Sweden	The ship was lost in the North Sea before 12 September. Seven crew were rescued by Paul Jones (United Kingdom)
James Ridley	United Kingdom	The ship was driven ashore at Troy, Ottoman Empire. She was on a voyage from Constanţa, Ottoman Empire to a British port.
Jeannie Deans	United Kingdom	The ship was wrecked between Green Island and the Fitzroy Islands, Tasmania before 15 September.
John Bell	United States	The 209-ton sternwheel paddle steamer struck a snag and sank in the Missouri River at St. Charles, Missouri, on either 24 or 28 September.
Jubina	Kingdom of Hanover	The galiot was abandoned in the North Sea 230 nautical miles (430 km) off Spurn Point, Yorkshire, United Kingdom before 11 September. She was on a voyage from Danzig to Emden.
Leith	United Kingdom	The brig ran aground on the Shipwash Sand, in the North Sea off the coast of Suffolk. She was refloated with assistance from the smack Aurora's Increase (United Kingdom).
Ligny	Netherlands	The barque foundered in the Indian Ocean before 17 September.
Madison	Confederate States of America	American Civil War: The 99-ton sidewheel paddle steamer was scuttled by her owner on the rocks at Troy Spring, Florida, to safeguard her from seizure by Union forces. Her boilers and funnel salvaged during the War.
Mona	United Kingdom	The three-masted schooner was wrecked on the coast of Japan before 11 September.
Montebello	United Kingdom	The schooner was abandoned between 9 and 12 September. She was on a voyage from Jamaica to Ragged Island, Bahamas.
Pactolus	United Kingdom	The steamship was wrecked near Liverpool, Nova Scotia, British North America before 19 September. She was on a voyage from Liverpool, Lancashire to Halifax, Nova Scotia and Saint John, New Brunswick, British North America.
Patriot	United Kingdom	The ship was driven ashore at Stolpmünde, Prussia. She was on a voyage from Pori, Grand Duchy of Finland to Málaga, Spain. She was refloated.
Pomona	United Kingdom	The ship foundered in the North Sea on or before 4 September. Her crew were rescued. She was on a voyage from Hartlepool to Kronstadt, Russia.
Rosina	United Kingdom	The ship was captured by pirates and sunk in the South China Sea. She was on a voyage from Ningpo to Shangai.
Sebim	(United Kingdom of Great Britain and Ireland) New Zealand	The schooner was wrecked in the Chatham Islands, New Zealand early in September when the wind veered during a heavy gale. All hands were saved.
Smoker	United Kingdom	American Civil War, Union blockade: Carrying a cargo of cotton transferred from the blockade runner Sarah (Flag unknown), the steamer was declared a total loss after becoming stranded near Tampico, Mexico.
St. Simon	France	The brig was wrecked at "Casmarice". She was on a voyage from Liverpool, Lancashire to an African port.
St. Theodosius	United Kingdom	The steamship was reported missing, presumed foundered in a typhoon in the South China Sea.
Sunnyside	United Kingdom	The ship was driven ashore at Guanabo, Cuba. She was on a voyage from Cienfuegos, Cuba to Philadelphia, Pennsylvania, United States. She was refloated on 2 September and towed in to Havana, Cuba.
Vanderbilt	United States	American Civil War: The steamship was captured and sunk in the Atlantic Ocean by CSS Georgia (Confederate States Navy).
Wilhelmine	(Russian Empire) Grand Duchy of Finland	The schooner capsized and sank at South Shields, County Durham. She was later refloated.
William and Anne	United Kingdom	The ship was abandoned in the Bristol Channel off Lundy Island, Devon. She was on a voyage from Falmouth, Cornwall to Cardiff, Glamorgan.
Zeven Sternen	Netherlands	The ship was driven ashore near Hellevoetsluis, Zeeland. before 12 September.
