= Matenga =

Matenga is often a Māori name. Notable people with the name include:

- Edward Matenga, Zimbabwean archaeologist
- Hoani Matenga (born 1987), New Zealand rugby player
- Huria Matenga (1842–1909), New Zealand tribal leader and landowner
- Joey Matenga Ashton (1907–1993), New Zealand railway worker, sportsman, and dance band leader
- Te Matenga Taiaroa (c.1795–1863), New Zealand tribal leader
- Te Matenga Tamati (died c.1914), New Zealand religious leader
- Edwina Matenga, Cook Islander footballer on the national team
- Luciana Matenga, Cook Islander netball player at the 2010 Commonwealth Games
- Margharet Matenga, Cook Islander netball player who joined the New Zealand national team in 1979
- Matenga Baker, New Zealand tribal leader and father of actress Tungia Baker
- Matenga Baker (rugby), New Zealand rugby player in the Spanish club UE Santboiana
- Hemi Matenga Waipunahau (died 1912), New Zealand landowner and namesake of the Hemi Matenga Memorial Scenic Reserve
- Teariki Matenga, Cook Islander and first coalition Minister of Justice
