= Cable Bay =

Bay and small settlement in New Zealand

Coordinates: 41°9′20″S 173°24′39″E

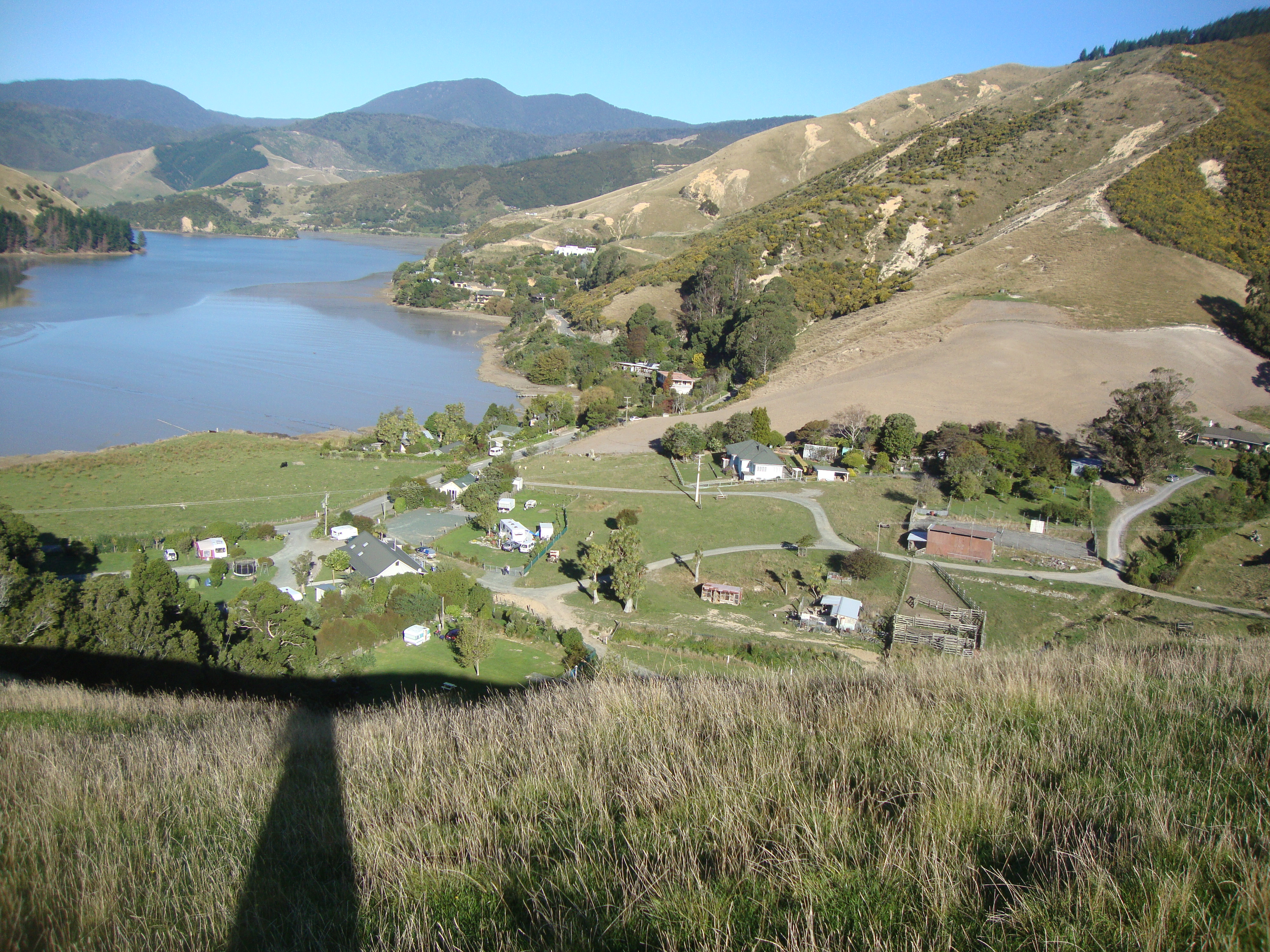
Overlooking Cable Bay towards the Wakapuaka estuary

Rotokura / Cable Bay is a bay and small settlement 18 kilometres (11 mi) north-east of Nelson in New Zealand. The settlement at the head of the bay is at the southern end of a thin strip of land or causeway connecting Pepin Island with the South Island.

The New Zealand Ministry for Culture and Heritage gives a translation of "red glow of sunset on the water" for Rotokura.

The bay itself is a 600 metres (2,000 ft) wide, northwest-facing bay in the Tasman Bay / Te Tai-o-Aorere. It lies just north of the Horoirangi Marine Reserve, between the tidal island Pepin Island and the mainland. It provides a natural boulder barrier from the sea for the Wakapuaka estuary.

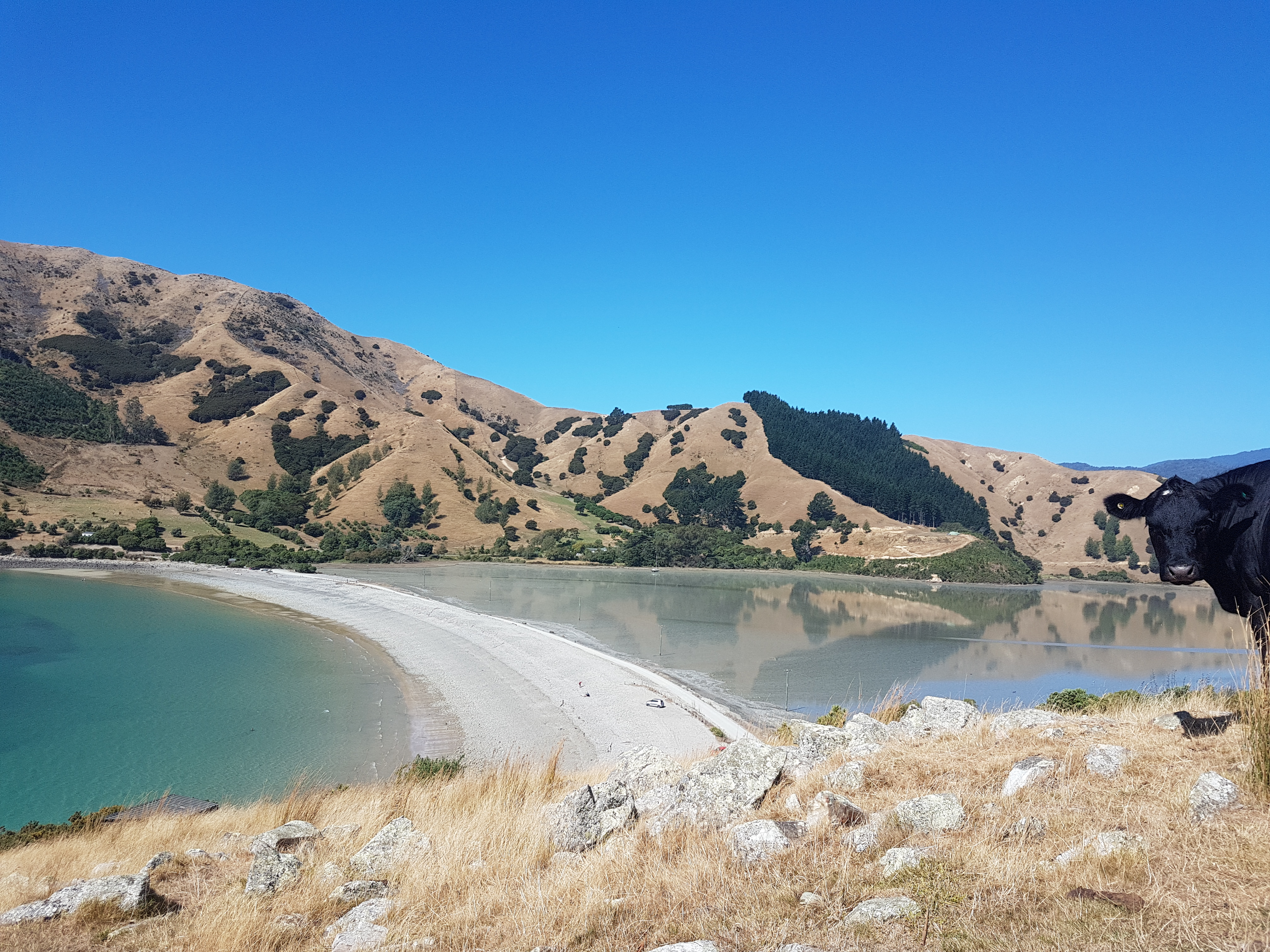
Looking down on the beach at Cable Bay, with Pepin Island beyond

== History ==
There is evidence that Māori used the area around Cable Bay from about 1150 for fishing and camping. There was also a pā on Pepin Island near the end of the causeway linking the island to the mainland. Both the pā and the bay itself were known as Rotokura.

European settlers named the bay Schroders Mistake following an incident in April 1843. A cutter owned by Schroder, a Nelson merchant, was taking a survey party led by John Barnicoat to Marlborough, but it became stranded on the sand bar. The general locality is known as Wakapuaka.

The name Cable Bay arose from New Zealand's first overseas cable link, to Australia, which was opened on 21 February 1876. The international telegraph cable established a connection with the worldwide telegraph network via Sydney. The cable came ashore into a timber building, continuing through a cedar-topped cable, a stone-cemented passage and underground to the cable house. From the cable station, messages were sent to Nelson via telegraph wire. This new service meant communications to Europe only took four days instead of up to six months for letters. With a population of about 30, the cable station was a self-contained village.

The company's offices and sleeping quarters burned down in 1914. The cable station remained in operation until 1917, when the cable was shifted to Tītahi Bay near Wellington due to the increasing economic importance of the North Island. The place name changed to Cable Bay in 1926.

In March 2001, Telecom installed a 200 km long submarine cable system between Cable Bay and Hokio Beach near Levin. The cable has 24 fibre-optic strands with no intermediate repeaters and provides a communications cable between the South Island and the North Island that is physically diverse from the existing Cook Strait communications cables. The terminal stations are located at Nelson and Levin.

In August 2014 the name of the bay officially became Rotokura / Cable Bay, following the Treaty of Waitangi settlement between the Crown and Ngāti Tama ki Te Tau Ihu.

== Recreation ==
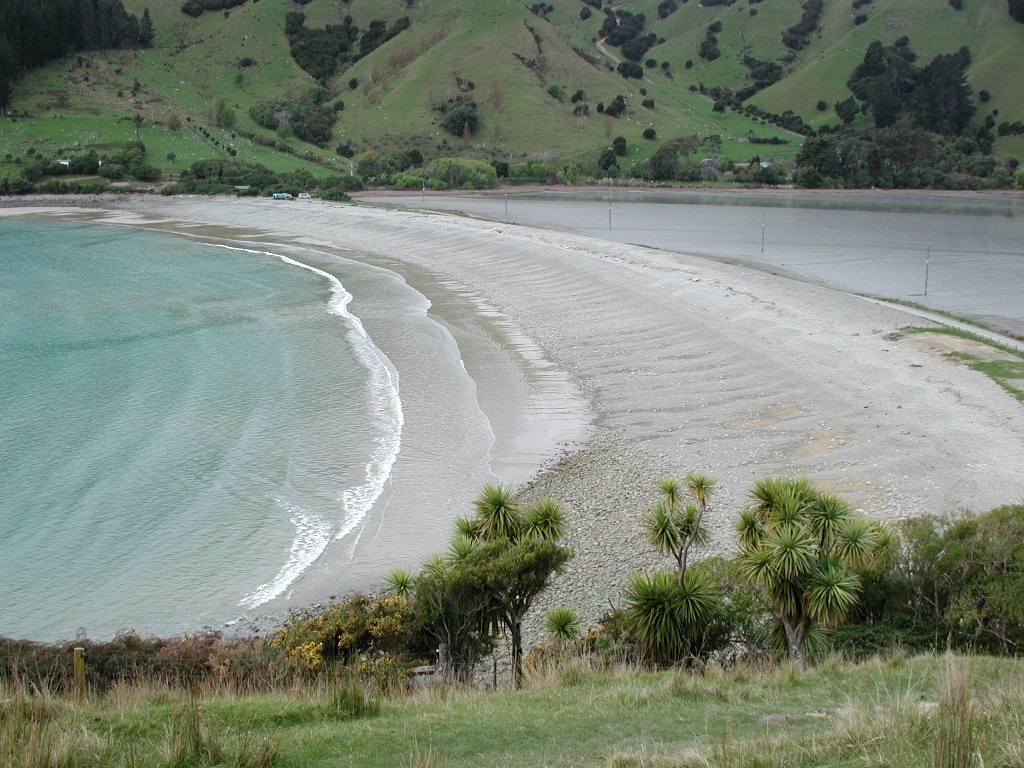
Rotokura / Cable Bay

The sheltered beach at Cable Bay has sandy patches but is mostly a shingle beach. The thin land connection to Pepin Island forming the crest of the beach is the result of a rare combination of strong currents and a rock source. The area is part of the Cable Bay Recreation Reserve, managed by the New Zealand Department of Conservation. It offers ample parking, toilets, and picnic tables, but no rubbish facilities. Overnight staying is not permitted on the reserve.

The adjacent marine reserve offers recreational opportunities such as kayaking and snorkelling. There are also sea kayak trip ranging from half-day to day-trips around Pepin Island departing at Cable Bay.

The three-hour Cable Bay Walkway leads over farmland south to Glenduan, offering coastal views of the Boulder Bank. The track is a tramping track and crosses private farmland. It is closed during lambing season in spring, and no dogs are allowed.

Up the road from the Cable Bay beach is the Cable Bay Café, which is one of the oldest cafes in the Nelson region, originally opened as a tearoom in 1920.
