= Todds Valley =

Township in Nelson, New Zealand

- Town
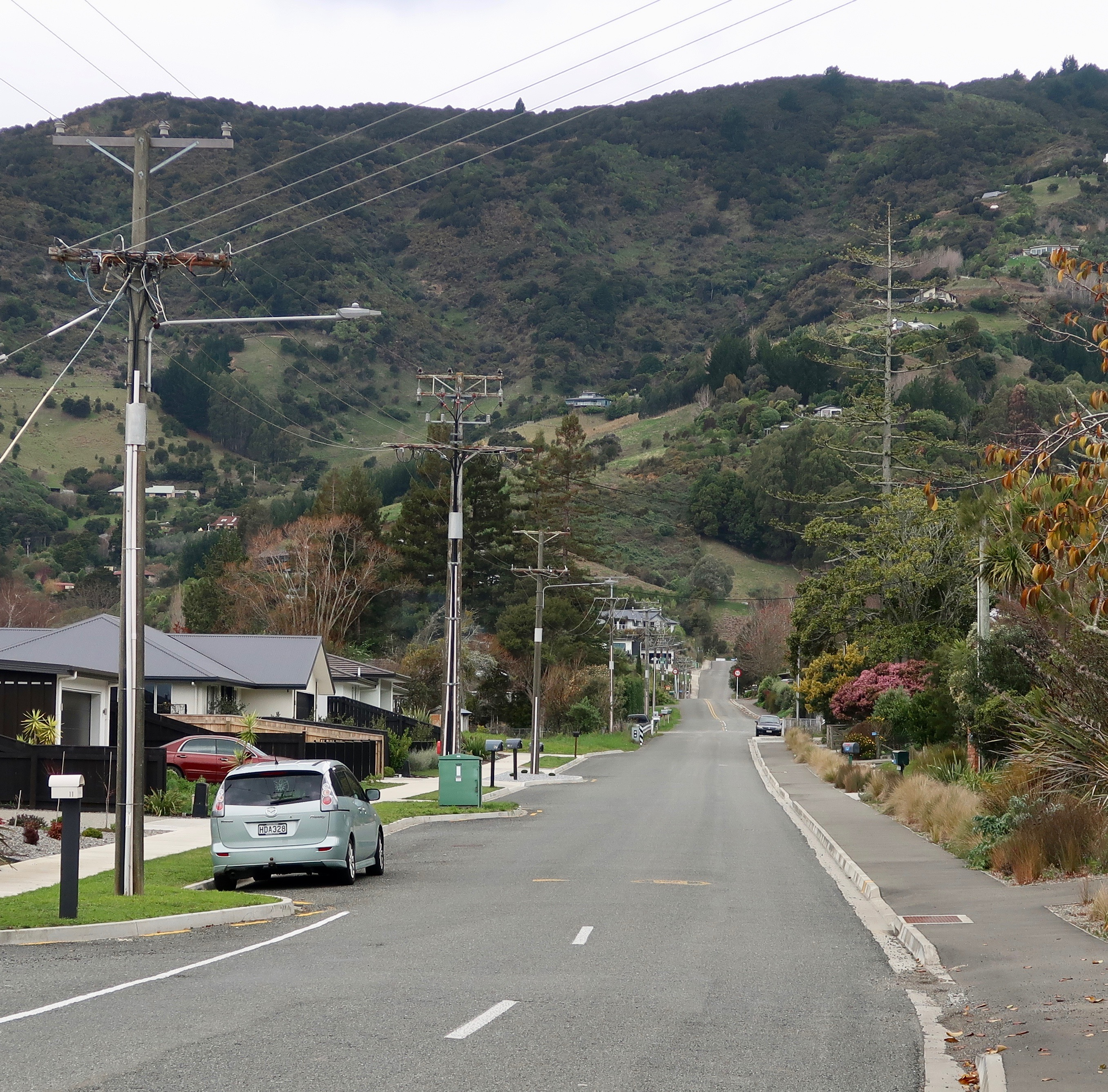
- Street of Todds Valley
- Interactive map of Todds Valley
- Coordinates: 41°13′0″S 173°20′20″E
- Country: New Zealand
- Region: Nelson
- Ward: Central General Ward; Whakatū Māori Ward
- Electorates: Nelson; Te Tai Tonga (Māori)

Government
  - Territorial Authority: Nelson City Council
  - Mayor of Nelson: Nick Smith
  - Nelson MP: Rachel Boyack
  - Te Tai Tonga MP: Tākuta Ferris

Area
  - Total: 5.01 km^{2} (1.93 sq mi)

Population (2023 Census)
  - Total: 264
  - Density: 52.7/km^{2} (136/sq mi)

Todds Valley is a small township to the north of Nelson, New Zealand. It lies to the southeast of State Highway 6, immediately to the north of Marybank, New Zealand at the northern tip of Nelson Haven.

== Demographics ==
Todds Valley covers 5.01 km^{2} (1.93 sq mi). It is part of the Nelson Rural statistical area.

Historical population
| Year | Pop. | ±% p.a. |
|---|---|---|
| 2006 | 144 | — |
| 2013 | 210 | +5.54% |
| 2018 | 222 | +1.12% |
| 2023 | 264 | +3.53% |

Todds Valley had a population of 264 in the 2023 New Zealand census, an increase of 42 people (18.9%) since the 2018 census, and an increase of 54 people (25.7%) since the 2013 census. There were 132 males, 135 females, and 3 people of other genders in 108 dwellings. 1.1% of people identified as LGBTIQ+. There were 51 people (19.3%) aged under 15 years, 21 (8.0%) aged 15 to 29, 156 (59.1%) aged 30 to 64, and 42 (15.9%) aged 65 or older.

People could identify as more than one ethnicity. The results were 93.2% European (Pākehā); 8.0% Māori; 1.1% Pasifika; 3.4% Asian; 1.1% Middle Eastern, Latin American and African New Zealanders (MELAA); and 2.3% other, which includes people giving their ethnicity as "New Zealander". English was spoken by 98.9%, Māori by 3.4%, and other languages by 20.5%. No language could be spoken by 1.1% (e.g. too young to talk). The percentage of people born overseas was 34.1, compared with 28.8% nationally.

Religious affiliations were 22.7% Christian, 1.1% Hindu, 1.1% Māori religious beliefs, 1.1% Buddhist, 1.1% New Age, and 2.3% other religions. People who answered that they had no religion were 67.0%, and 4.5% of people did not answer the census question.

Of those at least 15 years old, 99 (46.5%) people had a bachelor's or higher degree, 96 (45.1%) had a post-high school certificate or diploma, and 27 (12.7%) people exclusively held high school qualifications. 42 people (19.7%) earned over $100,000 compared to 12.1% nationally. The employment status of those at least 15 was 117 (54.9%) full-time, 48 (22.5%) part-time, and 6 (2.8%) unemployed.
