= Hūria Mātenga =

New Zealand tribal leader (c.1842–1909)

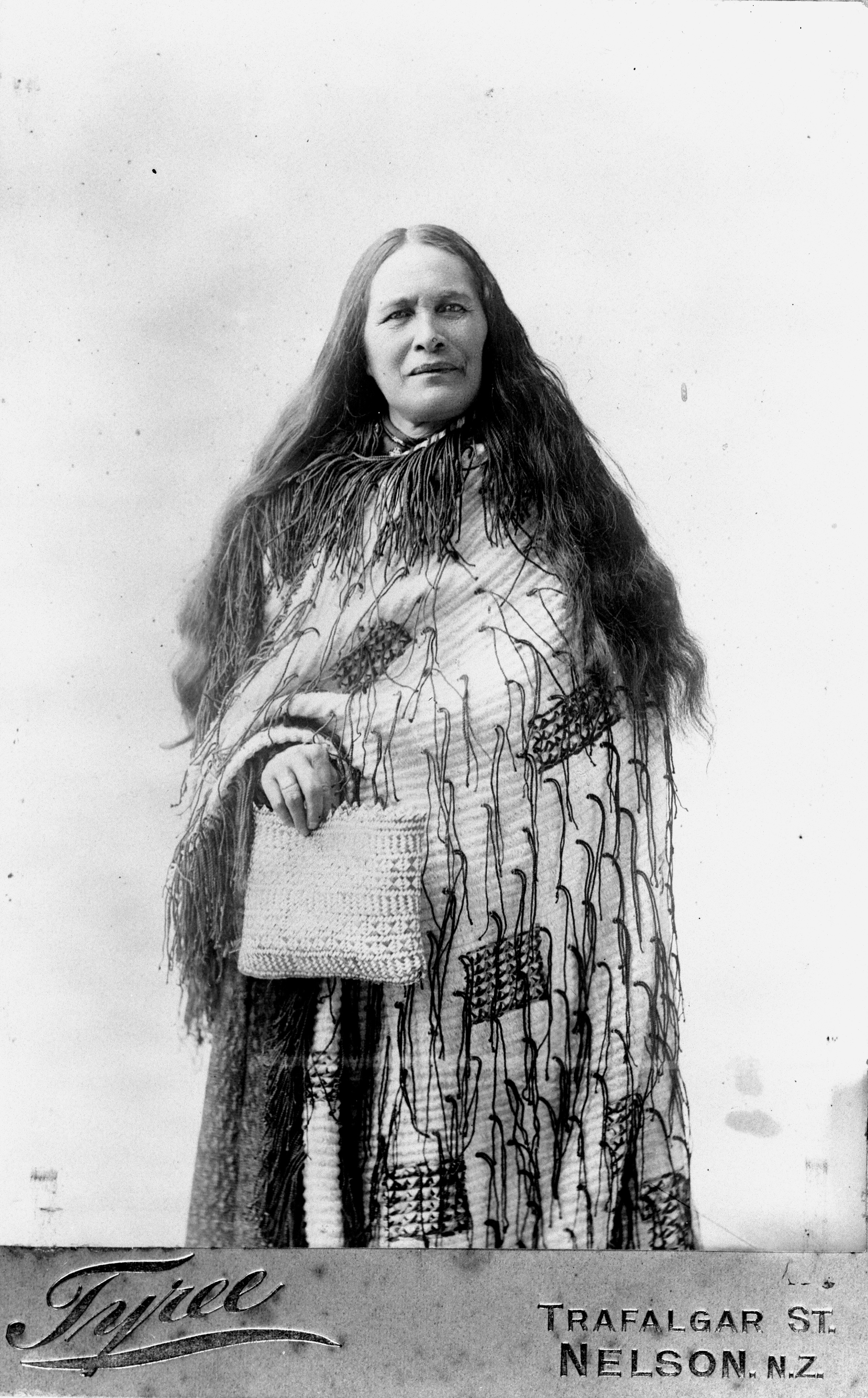
Photograph of Hūria Mātenga

Hūria Mātenga (c. 1842 – 24 April 1909, also known as Julia Martin) was a Māori leader and landowner. She was of Ngāti Tama, Ngāti Toa and Te Āti Awa iwi descent. She was born in Whakapuaka, Nelson, New Zealand in about 1842.

Mātenga was the daughter of Wikitōria Te Amohau Te Keha (Ngāti Te Whiti) and Wīremu Kātane Te Pūoho, from whom she inherited land rights to over 17,000 acres of land around Whakapuaka in 1880.

Mātenga entered an arranged marriage with Hēmi Mātenga Wai-Punahau (also known as James Martin) in 1858. Mātenga, along with her husband and others rescued the crew of the brigantine Delaware, which struck rocks in the Nelson region in 1863. From then on she was widely celebrated as the "Grace Darling of New Zealand." This took place during a period of armed conflict in Waikato and Taranaki, as the colonial government sought to suppress the Kīngitanga movement and acquire Māori land.

Mātenga was also a highly skilled weaver and two of her woven items are in the collection at Te Papa Tongarewa Museum of New Zealand. Mātenga’s piupiu (skirt) was gifted to Te Papa in 1961 and her korowai dates to around 1870. The limited scope of archival records relating to Mātenga's weaving practice may be a result of the heteropatriarchal structures governing cultural norms at the time, where the stories of wāhine Māori (Māori women) were often left out.

Mātenga died at Wakapuaka on 24 April 1909 after visiting Nelson. A tangihanga (funeral) for her held at Wakapuaka pā was attended by two thousand people.

== External reference ==
- Works by Hūria Mātenga in the collection of the Museum of New Zealand Te Papa Tongarewa
