= Stromboli-class sloop =

Class overview
- Name: Stromboli-class paddle sloop
- Builders: Portsmouth Dockyard; Sheerness Dockyard
- Operators: Royal Navy
- Preceded by: Hydra class
- Succeeded by: Alecto class
- Built: 1838–1840
- In commission: 1840–1866
- Completed: 2
- Lost: 0
- Retired: 2

General characteristics
- Type: Steam Vessels (SV2); First Class Sloop
- Displacement: 1,283 tons
- Tons burthen: 965 79/94 bm
- Length: 180 ft 0 in (54.9 m) gundeck; 157 ft 0.75 in (47.9 m) keel for tonnage
- Beam: 34 ft 4 in (10.5 m) maximum; 342 ft 0 in (104.2 m) for tonnage
- Draught: 13 ft 0 in (4.0 m) (forward); 13 ft 5 in (4.1 m) (aft)
- Depth of hold: 21 ft 0 in (6.4 m)
- Installed power: 280 nominal horsepower
- Propulsion: 2-cylinder side lever steam engine; Paddles
- Sail plan: 3-masted barque rigged
- Complement: 149 (later 160)
- Armament: As built: 2 × 10-inch (84 cwt) shell guns; 2 × 68-pdrs (64 cwt) carronades; 2 × 42-pdr (22 cwt) carronades; From 1856: 1 × 68-pdr (84 cwt) MLSB guns; 4 × 32-pdr (42 cwt) MLSB guns; 1860s; 1 × 110-pounder pivot gun; 4 × 32-pdr (42 cwt) MLSB guns

The Stromboli class was a group of two vessels designed by Sir William Symonds the Surveyor of the Navy. The design was approved on 29 August 1838. The vessels were of the Medea design but were altered to the new draught derived from the Gorgon. The ships were initially classified as Steam Vessels Second Class (SV2) and were later classified as First Class sloops. The ships were built in two Royal Dockyards (Portsmouth and Sheerness). Both ships were at the bombardment of Acre in 1840. Both were in the Black and Azov seas during the Russian War. They served on various stations of the Empire. Vesuvius was sold in 1865 and Stromboli in 1866. Both were broken by White at East Cowes on the Isle of Wight.

Stromboli was the only named vessel in the Royal Navy.

Vesuvius was the eleventh named vessel (spelt Vesuvius or Vesuve) since it was used for an 8-gun fireship, launched by Taylor of Cuckold's Point on 30 March 1691 and expended on 19 November 1693 at Saint-Malo.

== Design and specifications ==
Both vessels were ordered 12 March 1838 and laid down in September at Portsmouth and Sheerness. The vessels were launched in July (Vesuvius) and August (Stromboli) 1839. The gundeck was 180 feet 0 inches (54.86 metres) with the keel length of 157 feet 0.75 inches (47.87 metres) reported for tonnage. The maximum beam was 34 feet 4 inches (10.46 metres) with 34 feet 0 inches (10.36 metres) reported for tonnage. The depth of hold was 21 feet 0 inches (6.40 metres). The light draught forward was 13 feet 0 inches (3.96 metres) and 13 feet 5 inches (4.09 metres) aft. The builder's measure was calculated at 965 79/94 tons whereas the vessels displaced 1,283 tons.

Robert Napier & Sons of Govan supplied the machinery for both vessels. They were equipped with two fire-tube rectangular boilers. The engines were 2-cylinder vertical single expansion (VSE) side-lever steam engines rated at 280 nominal horsepower (NHP). This gave the ships a speed under power of about 9 knots (17 km/h). Pictures show Vesuvius with a barque rig.

All four ships were initially armed with two 10-inch 84 hundredweight (cwt) shell Millar's original guns on pivot mounts and two 68-pounder 64 cwt muzzle-loading smooth bore (MLSB) carronades and two 42-pounder (22 cwt) MLSB carronades on broadside trucks. In 1856 the 10-inch guns were replaced with a Dundas 1853 68-pounder 84 cwt MLSB gun and the carronades were replaced with four 32-pounder 42 cwt MLSB guns on broadside trucks. In the 1860s the 68-pounder was replaced with an Armstrong 7-inch rifled breechloader (RBL) gun. This weapon is also known as the 100/110-pounder gun depending on the weight of shell fired. (Note: "cwt", or "hundredweight" refers to the weight of the gun itself. "68-pounder" refers to the weight of the ball fired) They had a complement of approximately 149 men and grew to 160 men with the change in armament.

== Initial cost of vessels ==
- Stromboli: Total Cost £41,240 (Hull - £19,248; Machinery - £13,280; Fitting - £8,712) (Note: A total cost accounting for inflation of approximately £4,690,200 in today's money for Stromboli.)
- Vesuvius: Total Cost £39,505 (Hull - £21,707; Machinery - £13,309; Fitting - £4,389) (Note: A total cost accounting for inflation of approximately £4,492,900 in today's money for Vesuvius.)

== Ships ==
Name	Ship builder	Laid down	Launched	Commissioned	Fate
Stromboli	Portsmouth Dockyard	September 1838	27 August 1839	18 July 1840	sold for breaking August 1866
Vesuvius	Sheerness Dockyard	September 1838	11 July 1839	May 1840	sold for breaking June 1865
