= Hira, New Zealand =

Locality in Nelson, New Zealand

Hira
- Town
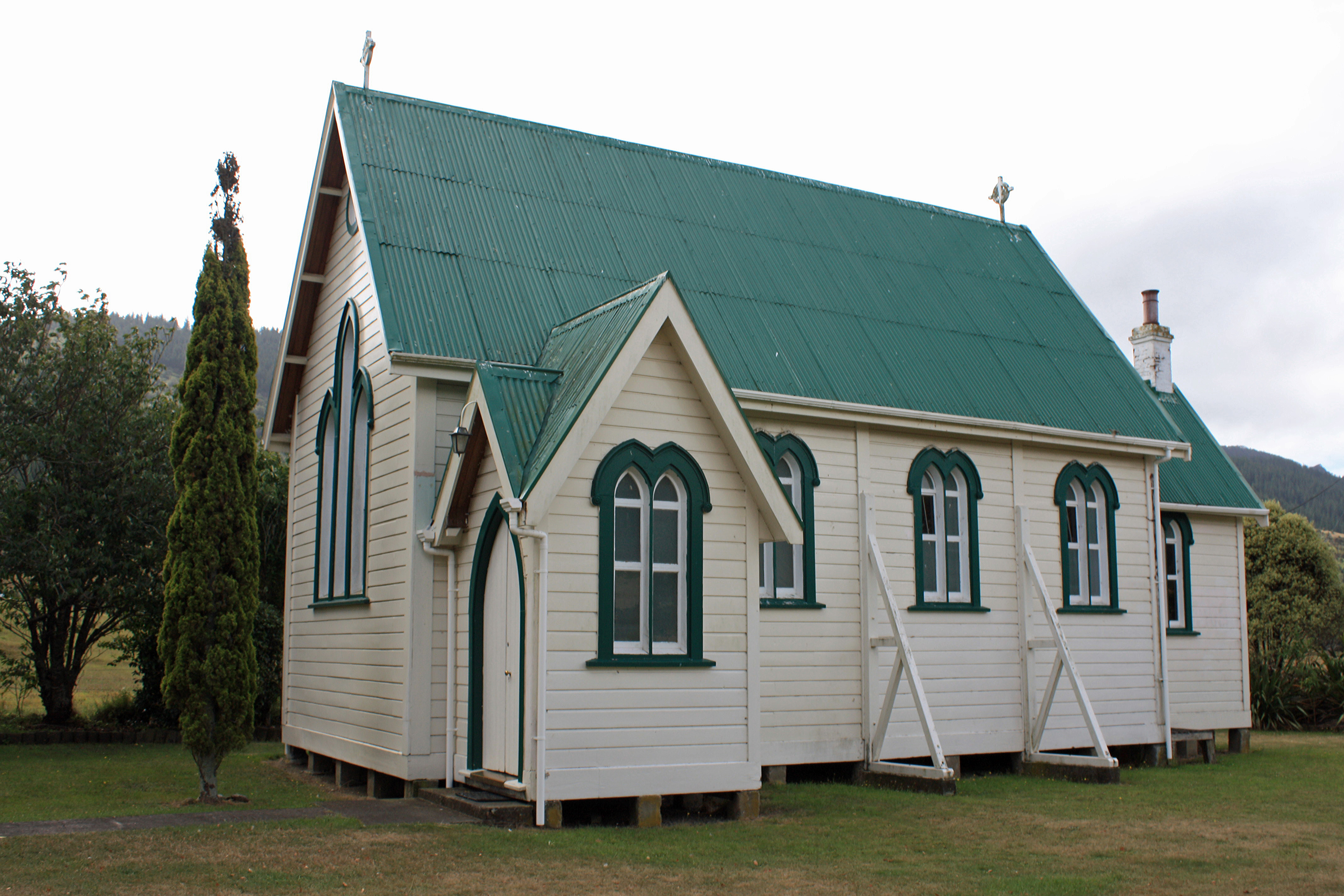
- St John the Evangelist Church at Hira
- Interactive map of Hira
- Coordinates: 41°13′S 173°24′E
- Country: New Zealand
- Region: Nelson
- Ward: Central General Ward; Whakatū Māori Ward
- Electorates: Nelson; Te Tai Tonga (Māori)

Government
  - Territorial Authority: Nelson City Council
  - Mayor of Nelson: Nick Smith
  - Nelson MP: Rachel Boyack
  - Te Tai Tonga MP: Tākuta Ferris

Area
  - Total: 181.58 km^{2} (70.11 sq mi)

Population (2023 census)
  - Total: 606
  - Density: 3.34/km^{2} (8.64/sq mi)

Hira is a small settlement approximately 20 kilometres (12 mi) northeast of Nelson, New Zealand. It sits in the valley of the Wakapuaka River.

== Demographics ==
Hira locality covers 181.58 km^{2} (70.11 sq mi). It is part of the larger Nelson Rural statistical area.

Historical population
Year	Pop.	±% p.a.
2006	525	—
2013	531	+0.16%
2018	543	+0.45%
2023	606	+2.22%

Hira had a population of 606 in the 2023 New Zealand census, an increase of 63 people (11.6%) since the 2018 census, and an increase of 75 people (14.1%) since the 2013 census. There were 312 males and 300 females in 213 dwellings. 2.5% of people identified as LGBTIQ+. There were 111 people (18.3%) aged under 15 years, 69 (11.4%) aged 15 to 29, 327 (54.0%) aged 30 to 64, and 96 (15.8%) aged 65 or older.

People could identify as more than one ethnicity. The results were 92.6% European (Pākehā); 10.9% Māori; 2.0% Pasifika; 4.5% Asian; 0.5% Middle Eastern, Latin American and African New Zealanders (MELAA); and 3.0% other, which includes people giving their ethnicity as "New Zealander". English was spoken by 99.0%, Māori by 1.0%, and other languages by 8.4%. No language could be spoken by 1.0% (e.g. too young to talk). New Zealand Sign Language was known by 0.5%. The percentage of people born overseas was 26.7, compared with 28.8% nationally.

Religious affiliations were 20.8% Christian, and 1.5% other religions. People who answered that they had no religion were 66.8%, and 10.4% of people did not answer the census question.

Of those at least 15 years old, 144 (29.1%) people had a bachelor's or higher degree, 261 (52.7%) had a post-high school certificate or diploma, and 105 (21.2%) people exclusively held high school qualifications. 60 people (12.1%) earned over $100,000 compared to 12.1% nationally. The employment status of those at least 15 was 255 (51.5%) full-time, 108 (21.8%) part-time, and 6 (1.2%) unemployed.

=== Nelson Rural statistical area ===
Nelson Rural statistical area covers 366.04 km^{2} (141.33 sq mi), and also includes Todds Valley, Glenduan, Wakapuaka and Pepin Island. It had an estimated population of 2,000 as of June 2025, with a population density of 5.5 people per km^{2}.

Historical population
Year	Pop.	±% p.a.
2006	1,536	—
2013	1,704	+1.49%
2018	1,896	+2.16%
2023	1,992	+0.99%

Nelson Rural had a population of 1,992 in the 2023 New Zealand census, an increase of 96 people (5.1%) since the 2018 census, and an increase of 288 people (16.9%) since the 2013 census. There were 990 males, 990 females, and 9 people of other genders in 732 dwellings. 2.9% of people identified as LGBTIQ+. The median age was 48.5 years (compared with 38.1 years nationally). There were 333 people (16.7%) aged under 15 years, 225 (11.3%) aged 15 to 29, 1,047 (52.6%) aged 30 to 64, and 390 (19.6%) aged 65 or older.

People could identify as more than one ethnicity. The results were 93.7% European (Pākehā); 9.3% Māori; 1.2% Pasifika; 2.9% Asian; 0.6% Middle Eastern, Latin American and African New Zealanders (MELAA); and 2.7% other, which includes people giving their ethnicity as "New Zealander". English was spoken by 98.6%, Māori by 1.4%, Samoan by 0.2%, and other languages by 11.4%. No language could be spoken by 1.1% (e.g. too young to talk). New Zealand Sign Language was known by 0.8%. The percentage of people born overseas was 27.1, compared with 28.8% nationally.

Religious affiliations were 20.8% Christian, 0.5% Hindu, 0.2% Māori religious beliefs, 0.5% Buddhist, 0.8% New Age, 0.2% Jewish, and 1.4% other religions. People who answered that they had no religion were 66.9%, and 9.3% of people did not answer the census question.

Of those at least 15 years old, 525 (31.6%) people had a bachelor's or higher degree, 843 (50.8%) had a post-high school certificate or diploma, and 291 (17.5%) people exclusively held high school qualifications. The median income was $39,500, compared with $41,500 nationally. 201 people (12.1%) earned over $100,000 compared to 12.1% nationally. The employment status of those at least 15 was 780 (47.0%) full-time, 357 (21.5%) part-time, and 24 (1.4%) unemployed.

== Education ==
Hira School is a co-educational state primary school for Year 1 to 6 students. It has a roll of 43 as of July 2026. It opened in 1872 as Happy Valley School. The school celebrated its 125th anniversary in 1997.
