= Horoirangi Marine Reserve =

Marine reserve near Nelson, New Zealand

- Glenduan Marine Reserve
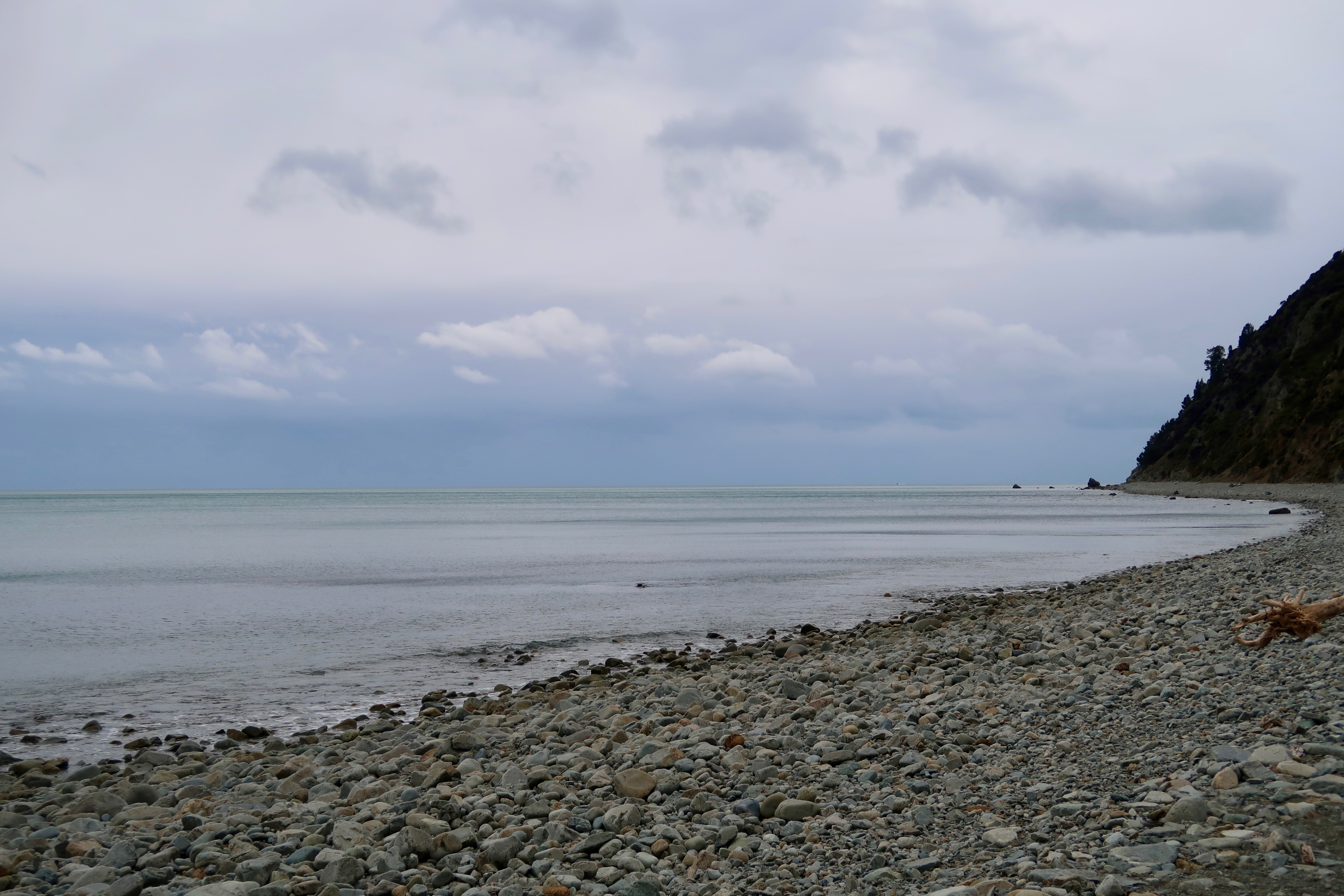
- Southern end of the reserve

- Location within New Zealand
- Interactive map of Horoirangi Marine Reserve
- Location: New Zealand
- Nearest city: Nelson
- Coordinates: 41°09′44″S 173°22′36″E
- Area: 9.04 km^{2} (3.49 sq mi)
- Established: 2005
- Governing body: Department of Conservation

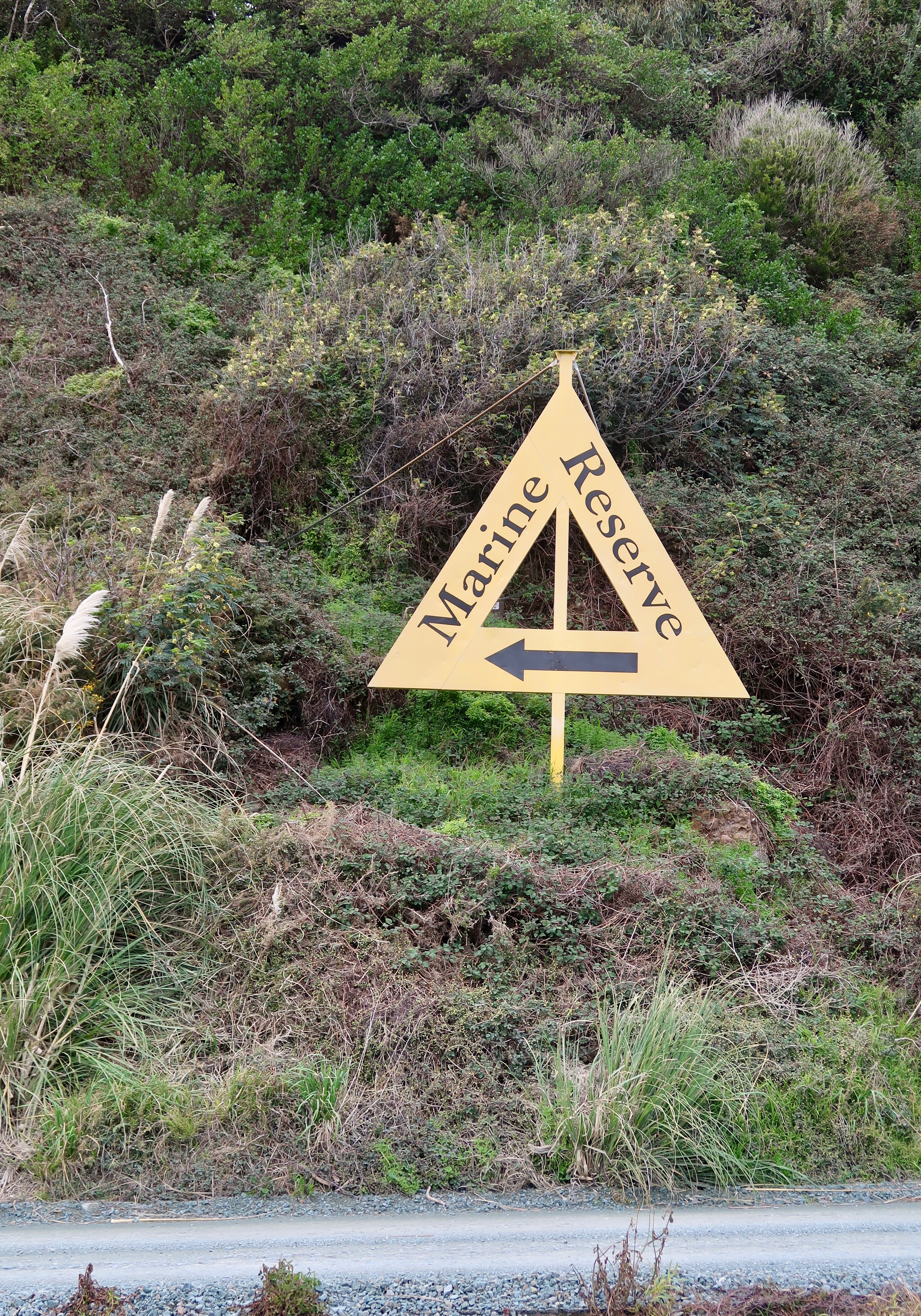
Southern boundary

The Horoirangi Marine Reserve, sometimes referred to as the Glenduan Marine Reserve, is situated to the north east of Nelson in New Zealand. It stretches along the coast from the northern end of Boulder Bank to just south of Cable Bay.

The reserve was established in 2005 and has an area of 904 ha (2,230 acres).

== See also ==
- Marine reserves of New Zealand
