= Marybank, New Zealand =

Suburb of Nelson, New Zealand

Marybank
- Suburb
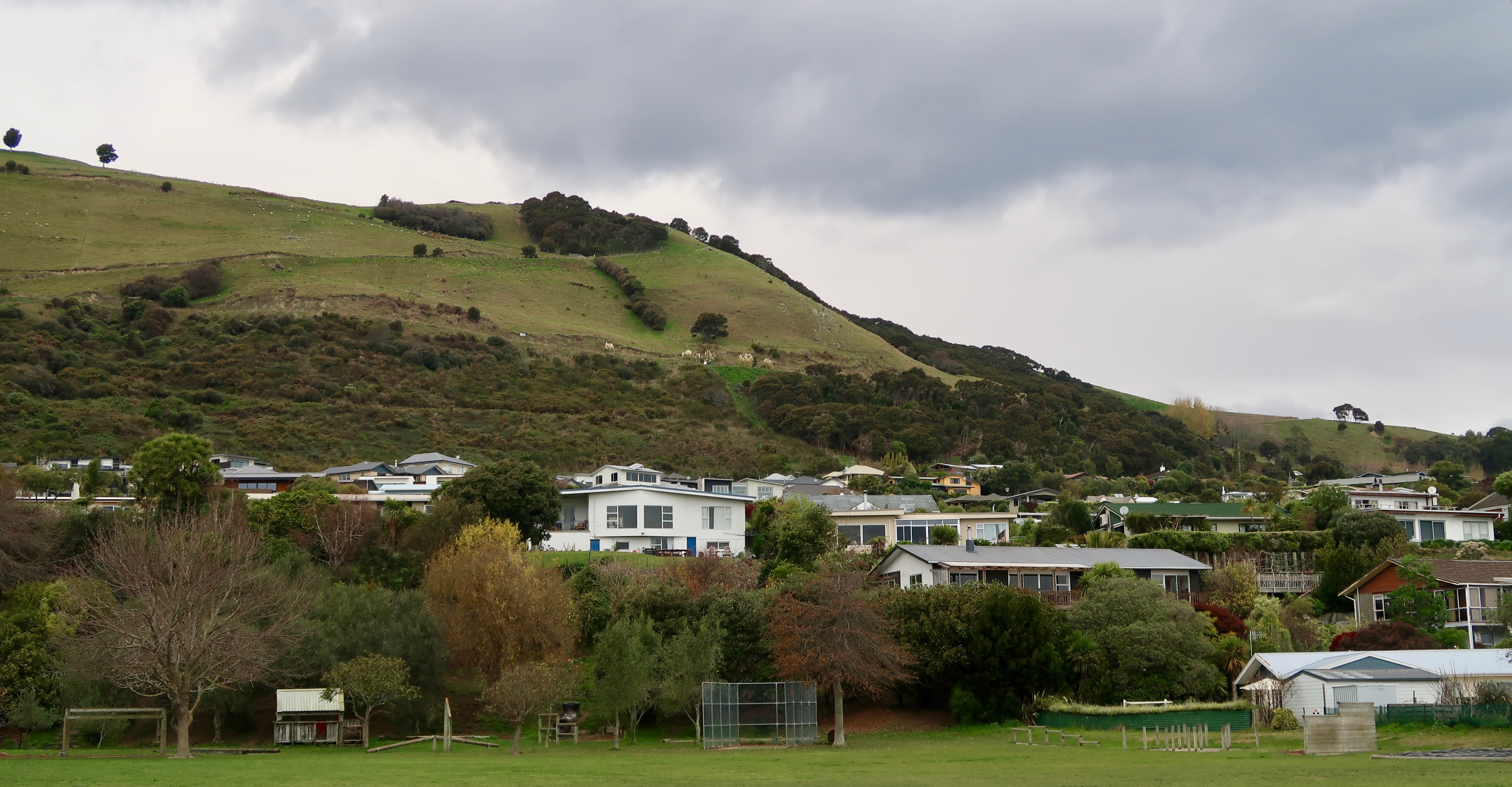
- Interactive map of Marybank
- Coordinates: 41°13′40″S 173°19′20″E
- Country: New Zealand
- Region: Nelson
- Ward: Central General Ward; Whakatū Māori Ward
- Electorates: Nelson; Te Tai Tonga (Māori)

Government
  - Territorial Authority: Nelson City Council
  - Mayor of Nelson: Nick Smith
  - Nelson MP: Rachel Boyack
  - Te Tai Tonga MP: Tākuta Ferris

Area
  - Total: 1.01 km^{2} (0.39 sq mi)
  - Land: 1.01 km^{2} (0.39 sq mi)
  - Water: 0 km^{2} (0 sq mi)

Population (June 2025)
  - Total: 1,130
  - Density: 1,120/km^{2} (2,900/sq mi)
- Time zone: UTC+12 (NZST)
  - Summer (DST): UTC+13 (NZDT)
- Postcode: 7010
- Area code: 03

Marybank is a suburb of Nelson, New Zealand. It lies on State Highway 6 close to the northern end of Nelson Haven, between Atawhai and Wakapuaka.

Marybank Reserve is the settlement's local park.

The Boulder Bank, a rare rocky bank located offshore of Marybank, is accessible from just north of the settlement. It is managed by the Department of Conservation.

== History ==
The estimated population of Marybank was 960 in 1996.

It reached 970 in 2001, 906 in 2006, 1,011 in 2013, and 1,068 in 2018.r

== Demography ==
The Marybank statistical area covers 1.01 km^{2} (0.39 sq mi). It had an estimated population of 1,130 as of June 2025, with a population density of 1,119 people per km^{2}.

Historical population
Year	Pop.	±% p.a.
2006	906	—
2013	1,011	+1.58%
2018	1,068	+1.10%
2023	1,113	+0.83%

Marybank had a population of 1,113 in the 2023 New Zealand census, an increase of 45 people (4.2%) since the 2018 census, and an increase of 102 people (10.1%) since the 2013 census. There were 537 males and 576 females in 462 dwellings. 1.6% of people identified as LGBTIQ+. The median age was 50.9 years (compared with 38.1 years nationally). There were 195 people (17.5%) aged under 15 years, 105 (9.4%) aged 15 to 29, 492 (44.2%) aged 30 to 64, and 321 (28.8%) aged 65 or older.

People could identify as more than one ethnicity. The results were 94.1% European (Pākehā); 7.3% Māori; 1.1% Pasifika; 4.3% Asian; 1.3% Middle Eastern, Latin American and African New Zealanders (MELAA); and 1.6% other, which includes people giving their ethnicity as "New Zealander". English was spoken by 98.4%, Māori by 1.1%, and other languages by 10.5%. No language could be spoken by 1.3% (e.g. too young to talk). New Zealand Sign Language was known by 0.3%. The percentage of people born overseas was 26.7, compared with 28.8% nationally.

Religious affiliations were 28.0% Christian, 0.5% Hindu, 1.1% Islam, 0.5% Buddhist, 0.3% New Age, and 1.1% other religions. People who answered that they had no religion were 59.6%, and 8.6% of people did not answer the census question.

Of those at least 15 years old, 276 (30.1%) people had a bachelor's or higher degree, 504 (54.9%) had a post-high school certificate or diploma, and 147 (16.0%) people exclusively held high school qualifications. The median income was $42,800, compared with $41,500 nationally. 114 people (12.4%) earned over $100,000 compared to 12.1% nationally. The employment status of those at least 15 was 402 (43.8%) full-time, 141 (15.4%) part-time, and 9 (1.0%) unemployed.

== Economy ==
In 2018, 9.2% of people worked in manufacturing, 9.2% worked in construction, 4.9% worked in hospitality, 3.8% worked in transport, 0.0% worked in finance and administration, 9.8% worked in education, and 9.2% worked in healthcare.

== Transport ==
As of 2018, among those who commute to work, 69.6% drove a car, 4.3% rode in a car, 4.3% use a bike, and 4.3% walk or run.

== Education ==
Clifton Terrace School is a co-educational state primary school for Year 1 to 6 students. It has a roll of 271 as of July 2026. It opened in 1856.

Hillside School in Wakapuaka opened in 1857 and closed in 1926, with its students going to Clifton Terrace School the following year.
