= Edward Matenga =

Zimbabwean archaeologist

Edward J. Matenga is a Zimbabwean archaeologist and the former director of the Great Zimbabwe World Heritage Site 1998 – 2004. He was a curator at the Zimbabwe Museum of Human Sciences in Harare from 1988 to 1994. He is now an independent heritage management consultant based in Pretoria, South Africa. He is a member of the International Council on Monuments and Sites (ICOMOS).

Matenga was born on 6 September 1963 at Chiendambuya, Headlands, near Rusape, but he grew up in Buhera District, his ancestral land, where he did primary school education at Barura and Murwira Primary schools in the 1970s. He subsequently attended Makumbe Mission High School in Buhera, and Gutu Mission High School in Masvingo, before proceeding to the University of Zimbabwe in 1984. He studied History and Archaeology and graduated in 1986 with a Bachelors' Honours Degree. In 1988 he was awarded a Swedish government scholarship to study Archaeology at Uppsala University. He obtained a Master of Philosophy (MPhil) degree in archaeology in 1993. In 2011 Matenga obtained his PhD in archaeology and heritage from Uppsala University, in Sweden

Matenga authored a seminal book, "The Soapstone Birds of Great Zimbabwe: Symbols of a Nation" (1998), providing a new perspective on the meaning and significance of these charismatic carvings. In particular, his thesis that the birds may have been totemic emblems foregrounded the fish eagle (Hungwe) and the associated totemic praise poetry, which have a large affiliation in Zimbabwe. This stoked further academic debate and speculation. The Zimbabwe Birds have inspired creative art as they have been adopted in stylized motifs as logos by many public and private organizations. They preside over the Zimbabwean flag and government coat-of-arms.

In 1995 Matenga supervised a team of traditional stonemasons in an ambitious project to restore wooden lintels at the western entrance to the Great Enclosure, the iconic and largest dry masonry structure at the Great Zimbabwe World Heritage site. There was material evidence to attest that in fact all three entrances to this large stone building had wooden lintels carrying the walls over the entrances. Over time the wooden cross beams had failed resulting in collapse. As there was so much hesitation, a "life-size" experimental wall was constructed at the Great Zimbabwe Conservation Centre, and armed with the experience and lessons learnt, the team had mustered the confidence to execute the restoration.

== Selected publications ==
- Archaeological Figurines from Zimbabwe. 1993.
- "Documenting the Stones on the Walls of Great Zimbabwe" in Monuments and Sites: Zimbabwe, International Council on Monuments and Sites, 1996.
- The Soapstone Birds of Great Zimbabwe: Symbols of a Nation. African Publishing Group, Harare, 1998. ISBN 1779011350
- "The Soapstone Birds of Great Zimbabwe Symbols of a Nation", The South African Archaeological Bulletin, 56 (173/174):105 (December 2001)
- The Soapstone Birds of Great Zimbabwe: Archaeological Heritage, Religion and Politics in Postcolonial Zimbabwe and the Return of Cultural Property. Uppsala University, 2011. ISBN 9789150622409 (Volume 16 of Studies in Global Archaeology)
- 1995. With Lindahl, Anders "Ceramics and Homesteads: an Ethno-archaeological Study in the Buhera District south-eastern Zimbabwe." Studies in African Archaeology 11.
- 1996a "Conservation History of the Great Enclosure, Great Zimbabwe, with reference to the proposed restoration of a lintel entrance." In Pwiti, Gilbert and Robert Soper (eds). Aspects of African Archaeology: Papers from the 10th Pan-African Association for Prehistory and Related Studies: pp825-826.
- 1997. “Restoration of the Western Entrance to the Great Enclosure, Great Zimbabwe”. Zimbabwean Prehistory, 22: pp6-13.
- 2018. with A. Lindahl. Making Inventory. Mapping and exploring Zimbabwe Zites. In Ekblom, A. Et al. The Resilience of the Past: Cultivating a Future of the Past. Essays in Honour of Prof Paul Sinclair. Studies in Global Archaeology. Uppsala: Uppsala University.
- 2003. “Osm zimbabwskych steatitovych ptaku” In Hulec, O. C. Winter-Irving, and J. Oslar. Moderni Zimbabwske socharstvi. Czech Republic: Orientalni Akademie ved.
- 2017. Who is indigenous? Migration theories and notions of indigeneity in Southern African archaeology. Archaeologies of Us and Them: Debating History, Heritage and Indigeneity. Routlegde.
- 1998. Iron Age Figurines from Zimbabwe. In Zimbabwe: Past and Present. Tervuren: Royal Museum of Central Africa. (Publication accompanying exhibition at the Royal Museum of Central Africa)
