= Pepin Island =

Island in New Zealand

Coordinates: 41°9′5″S 173°25′32″E

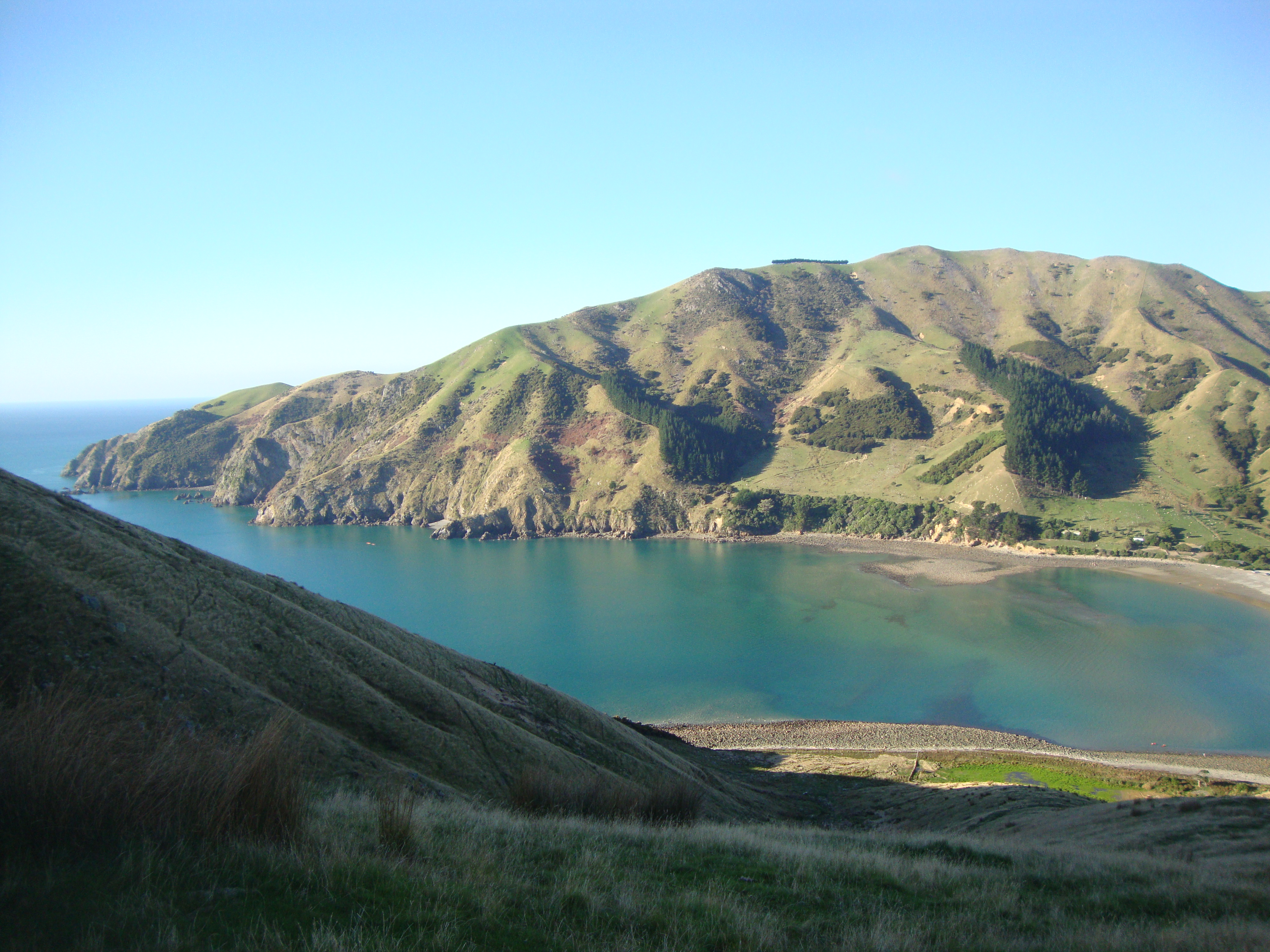
The western end of Pepin Island

Pepin Island is a privately owned tied island in New Zealand connected by a causeway to the settlement of Cable Bay, north-east of Nelson.

== Geography ==
Pepin Island is 3.5 kilometres (2.2 mi) long, and up to 2.1 kilometres (1.3 mi) wide. It measures 5.18 square kilometres (2.0 sq mi) in area. The highest point is Stuart Hill, which rises to 401 metres (1,316 ft). The island is located on the northeast coast of Tasman Bay / Te Tai-o-Aorere, with the smaller indentation of Delaware Bay to the east. It is joined to the mainland by a naturally-formed pathway made from boulders that have tumbled down nearby hillsides and then been shaped into a causeway by the sea.

== History ==
According to the New Zealand historian John Mitchell, the Ngāti Tama and other iwi came into the area from the 1820s. That part of the island was once the pā of the paramount chief of Tama, Te Pūoho-o-te-rangi, but it left Ngāti Tama control around 1880.

The island was named by the French explorer Jules Dumont d'Urville after his wife, Adèle Pépin.

In 1996, the island was bought by the German businesswoman Dr Viola von Hohenzollern (née Hallman) for NZ$2 million. When von Hohenzollern bought the island, it was overgrazed, run down and had many wild goats that prevented the growth of native bush. Her farm manager improved the situation by planting trees, fencing and pest control. Von Hohenzollern and farm manager, Andrew Newton, won a top Nelson Tasman Environmental award in 2011 for their custodianship.

In December 2012, von Hohenzollern died, and Pepin Island was inherited by her daughter, Olivia Hallman. The new owner has introduced public open days, and the second one was run in May 2015, which attracted over 1,000 people and was again a fundraiser for the Hira Volunteer Fire Force.

In late 2018, the island went on sale, with an asking price of $NZ16 million. Nelson mayor Rachel Reese expressed interest that the island be locally owned. In March 2021, a staff member from the real estate agency Sotheby's said that the price had been lowered to $13.5 million. In May 2021, it was announced that the island had been sold to a New Zealand company but that the name of the purchaser and the cost were being kept secret. According to Sotheby's, the new owner intends "to continue the current farming operation, tourist accommodation business, maintain current public access and further explore the establishment of strategic environmental areas across the island".
