= Wakapuaka =

- Town
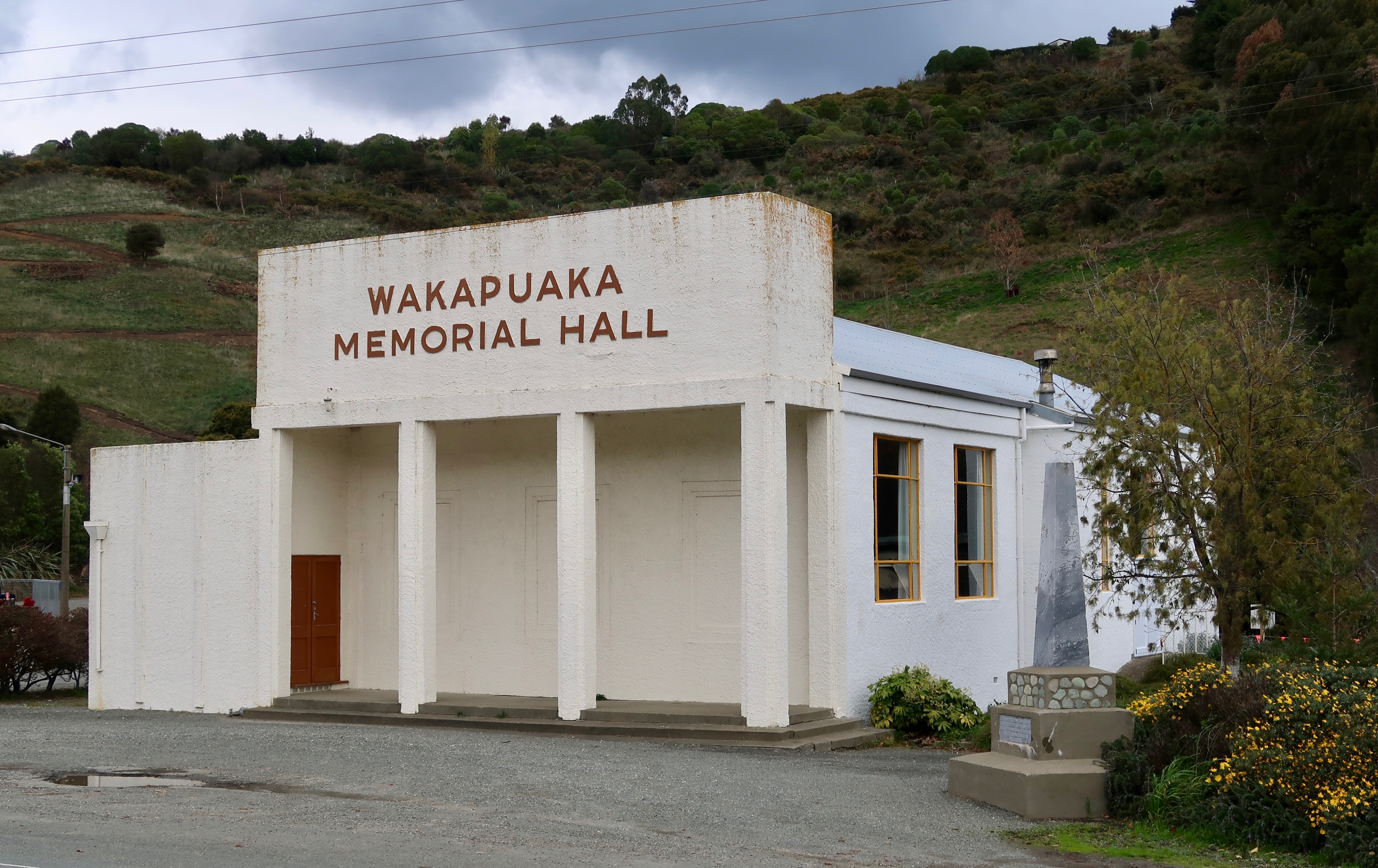
- Wakapuaka Memorial Hall
- Interactive map of Wakapuaka
- Coordinates: 41°12′20″S 173°21′10″E
- Country: New Zealand
- Region: Nelson
- Ward: Central General Ward; Whakatū Māori Ward
- Electorates: Nelson; Te Tai Tonga (Māori)

Government
  - Territorial Authority: Nelson City Council
  - Mayor of Nelson: Nick Smith
  - Nelson MP: Rachel Boyack
  - Te Tai Tonga MP: Tākuta Ferris

Area
  - Total: 10.86 km^{2} (4.19 sq mi)

Population (2023 census)
  - Total: 357
  - Density: 32.9/km^{2} (85.1/sq mi)

Wakapuaka is a small township lying to the north of Nelson, New Zealand. It lies on State Highway 6 inland from the northern end of Nelson Haven, between Marybank and Hira. The road to Glenduan joins SH 6 at Wakapuaka.

== Parks ==
Wakapuaka Sandflats Esplanade, a local public park area, is located in Wakapuaka.

== Demographics ==
Wakapuaka locality covers 10.86 km^{2} (4.19 sq mi). It is part of the larger Nelson Rural statistical area.

Historical population
Year	Pop.	±% p.a.
2006	243	—
2013	258	+0.86%
2018	333	+5.24%
2023	357	+1.40%

Wakapuaka had a population of 357 in the 2023 New Zealand census, an increase of 24 people (7.2%) since the 2018 census, and an increase of 99 people (38.4%) since the 2013 census. There were 177 males, 177 females, and 3 people of other genders in 138 dwellings. 2.5% of people identified as LGBTIQ+. There were 57 people (16.0%) aged under 15 years, 36 (10.1%) aged 15 to 29, 171 (47.9%) aged 30 to 64, and 87 (24.4%) aged 65 or older.

People could identify as more than one ethnicity. The results were 96.6% European (Pākehā), 10.1% Māori, 1.7% Pasifika, 0.8% Asian, and 1.7% other, which includes people giving their ethnicity as "New Zealander". English was spoken by 98.3%, Māori by 2.5%, and other languages by 10.1%. The percentage of people born overseas was 24.4, compared with 28.8% nationally.

Religious affiliations were 17.6% Christian, and 0.8% New Age. People who answered that they had no religion were 72.3%, and 8.4% of people did not answer the census question.

Of those at least 15 years old, 84 (28.0%) people had a bachelor's or higher degree, 168 (56.0%) had a post-high school certificate or diploma, and 54 (18.0%) people exclusively held high school qualifications. 36 people (12.0%) earned over $100,000 compared to 12.1% nationally. The employment status of those at least 15 was 144 (48.0%) full-time and 66 (22.0%) part-time.

== Education ==
Hillside School opened in 1857. It closed in 1926, with its students going to Clifton Terrace School in Marybank the following year.

== Notable people ==
- Pérrine Moncrieff (1893–1979), writer, conservationist and amateur ornithologist, died in Wakapuaka.
