= HMS Vesuvius (1839) =

Sloop of the Royal Navy

History

United Kingdom
- Name: HMS Vesuvius
- Ordered: 12 March 1838
- Builder: Royal Dockyard, Sheerness
- Cost: £39,505
- Laid down: September 1838
- Launched: 11 July 1839
- Completed: 20 April 1840
- Commissioned: May 1840
- Honours and awards: Acre 1840; Crimea/Black Sea 1855; Sea of Azov 1855
- Fate: Sold for breaking June 1865

General characteristics
- Type: Steam Vessels (SV2); First Class Sloop
- Displacement: 1,283 tons
- Tons burthen: 965 79/94 bm
- Length: 180 ft 0 in (54.9 m) gundeck; 157 ft 1.375 in (47.9 m) keel for tonnage
- Beam: 34 ft 5 in (10.5 m) maximum; 34 ft 1 in (10.4 m) for tonnage
- Draught: 13 ft 0 in (4.0 m) (forward); 13 ft 5 in (4.1 m) (aft)
- Depth of hold: 20 ft 11.5 in (6.4 m)
- Installed power: 280 nominal horsepower
- Propulsion: 2-cylinder side lever steam engine; Paddles
- Sail plan: 3-masted barque rigged
- Complement: 149 (later 160)
- Armament: As built: 2 × 10-inch (84 cwt) shell guns; 2 × 68-pdr (64 cwt) carronades; 2 × 42-pdr (22 cwt) carronades; From 1856: 1 × 68-pdr (84 cwt) MLSB guns; 4 × 32-pdr (42 cwt) MLSB guns; 1862; 1 × 110-pounder pivot gun; 4 × 32-pdr (42 cwt) MLSB guns

HMS Vesuvius was initially a Steam Vessel second class (later reclassed as a First Class Sloop) designed by Sir William Symonds, Surveyor of the Navy, and built at Sheerness. She was commissioned and participated in the bombardment of Acre in 1840, during the Russian War she was in the Black Sea and the Sea of Azov in 1855. Her last overseas posting was in the West Indies. She was sold for breaking in June 1865.

Vesuvius was the eleventh named vessel (spelt Vesuvius or Vesuve) since it was used for a 8-gun fireship, launched by Taylor of Cuckold's Point on 30 March 1691 and expended on 19 November 1693 at St Malo.

== Construction ==
She was ordered on 12 March 1838 with her laid in September at Sheerness Dockyard. She was launched on 11 July 1839. She was completed for sea on 20 April 1840 at an initial cost of £39,505, including £21,707 for hull construction, £13,309 for her machinery and £4,389 for her fitting out. (Note: A total cost accounting for inflation of approximately £3,786,600 in today's money.)

She was initially commissioned in May 1840 under the command of Lieutenant William Simpson Blount, RN for trials then used as a transport.

== Commissioned service ==
=== First commission ===
She was commissioned on 31 August 1840 under the command of Commander Thomas Henderson, RN for service in the Mediterranean. She was with the British squadron off the coast of Syria in November 1840. She participated in the bombardment of Acre on 3 November. Commander Erasmus Ommanney, RN took command on 23 August 1841. She returned to Home Waters paying off at Woolwich on 15 November 1844.

=== Second commission ===
She was commissioned on 22 March 1845 under the command of Commander George William Douglas O'Callaghan, RN for service on the North America and West Indies Station. Lieutenant Herbert Grey Austen, RN assumed command on 19 February 1847. She returned to Home Waters paying off on 14 September 1848.

=== Third commission ===
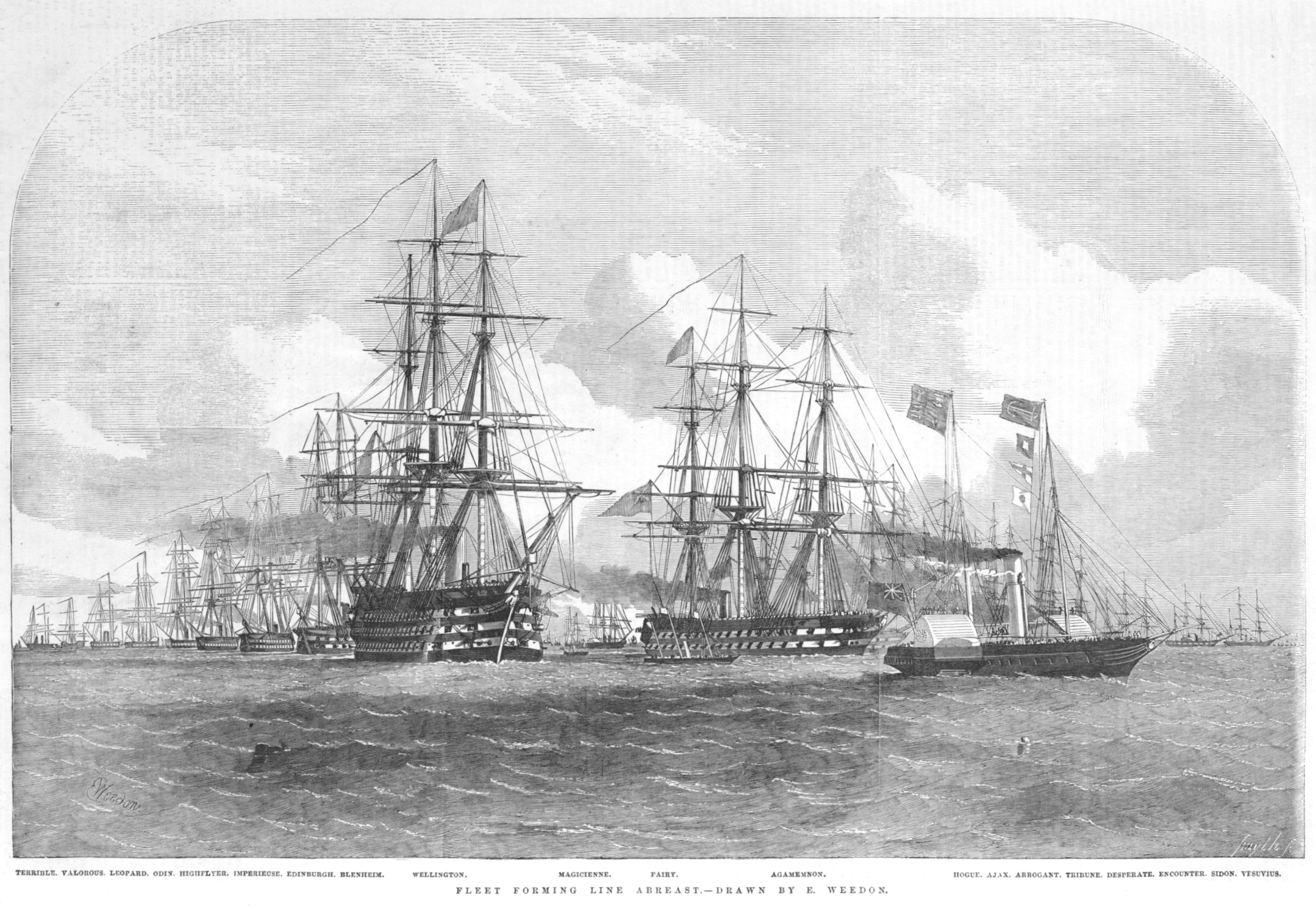
Fleet Forming Line Abreast at the 11 August 1853 Review, Vesuvius (far right), Illustrated London News

On March 22, 1852, she was commissioned under Commander Frederick Lamport Barnard, RN, then recommissioned on 17 August 1853 under Commander Richard Ashmore Powell, RN for service in the Mediterranean. During the Russian War she was at the bombardment of Sevastopol on 11 October 1854. Commander Sherard Osborn, RN took command on 16 February 1855. After the occupation of Kertch, she participated in the naval excursion led by HMS Miranda into the Sea of Azov. On 6 June 1855, she was under the command of Commander Francis Marten, RN (borne in Royal Albert) and assigned as tender to HMS Royal Albert.

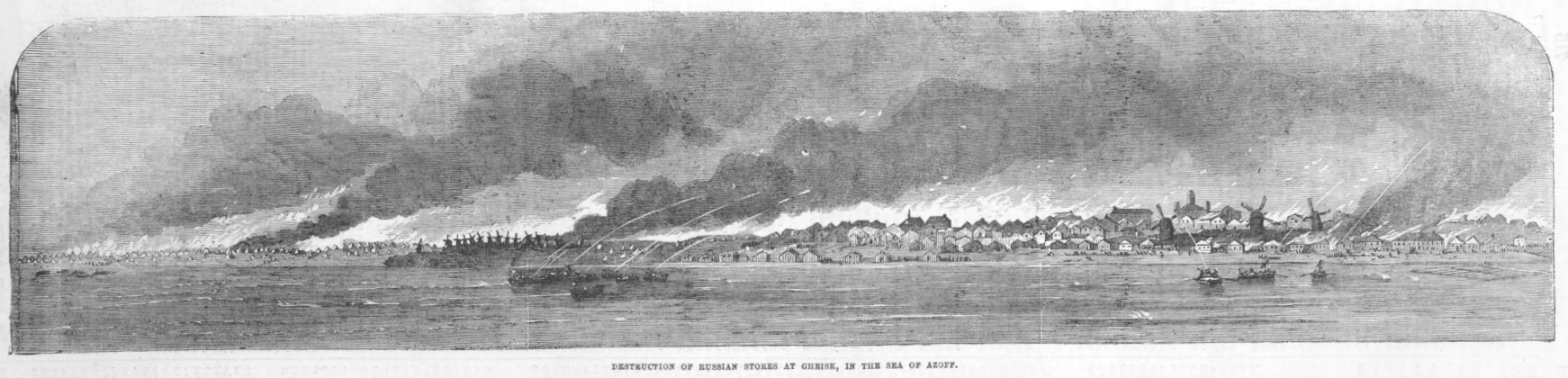
She attended the destruction of Russian stores at Gheisk, in the sea of Azoff, 5 November 1855, Illustrated London News

Commander Edward George Hore, RN took command on 29 October 1855 and returned to the Mediterranean. She returned to Home Waters and paid off at Woolwich on 17 January 1856.

=== Fourth commission ===
She commissioned for service on the West Coast of Africa under Commodore Charles Wise, RN as the Senior Officer's Ship, on 20 April 1857. She returned to Home Waters paying off at Deptford on 22 February 1860.

=== Fifth commission ===
She was commissioned on 16 July 1862 under Captain Richard Vesey Hamilton, RN for service in the West Indies. Prior to her departure she had been fitted with an Armstrong 110-pounder gun. She returned to Home Waters and paid off at Portsmouth on 8 November 1864.

== Disposition ==
She was sold in June 1865 to White of East Cowes, Isle of Wight. She was towed to Cowes on 10 November 1865 for breaking.
