= Ashbridge =

Ashbridge is an English surname. Notable people with this name include:

- Dorothea Ashbridge (1928–2021), New Zealand ballet judge, dancer, choreographer and teacher
- Elizabeth Ashbridge (1713–1755), English-born Quaker minister in New England
- George Richard Ashbridge (1901–1984), New Zealand accountant and teacher
- Ken Ashbridge (1916–2002), English footballer
- Noel Ashbridge (1889–1975), English engineer
- Samuel Howell Ashbridge (1848–1906), American politician
- Thomas Ashbridge (1890–1964), English footballer

Other

- Ashbridge's Creek, Toronto
- Ashbridge's Bay, Toronto
- Ashbridge Estate, Toronto
- David Ashbridge Log House, Pennsylvania

== See also ==
- Asbridge
