= Temuera =

Temuera is both a given name and surname of Māori origin. Notable people with the name include:

== Given name ==
- Temuera Morrison (born 1961), New Zealand actor

== Surname ==
- Pāora Temuera (1886–1957), New Zealand Anglican priest
