= Asbridge =

Asbridge is an English surname. Notable people with the surname include:

- John Asbridge, English clergyman
- Jonathan Asbridge, first president of the UK's Nursing and Midwifery Council
- Thomas S. Asbridge, medieval history scholar

== See also ==
- Ashbridge
