= 1950 Birthday Honours (New Zealand) =

Awards list for New Zealand

The 1950 King's Birthday Honours in New Zealand, celebrating the official birthday of King George VI, were appointments made by the King on the advice of the New Zealand government to various orders and honours to reward and highlight the good works of New Zealanders. They were announced on 8 June 1950.

The recipients of honours are displayed here as they were styled before receiving their new honour.

== Knight Bachelor ==
- John Andrew Charles Allum CBE – of Auckland; mayor of the City of Auckland.
- Ernest Herbert Andrews CBE – of Christchurch; mayor of the City of Christchurch.
- William Appleton – of Wellington; mayor of the City of Wellington.
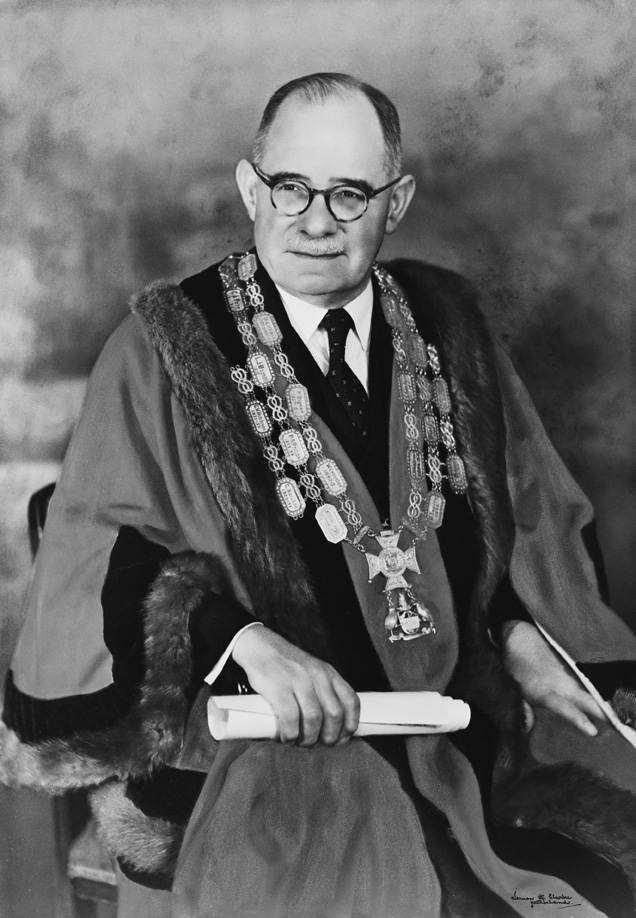
Sir John Allum

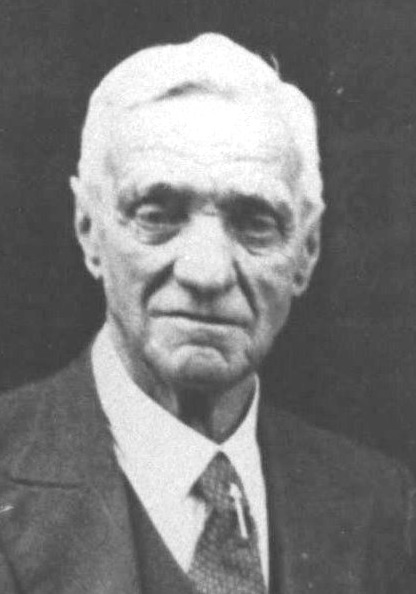
Sir Ernest Andrews

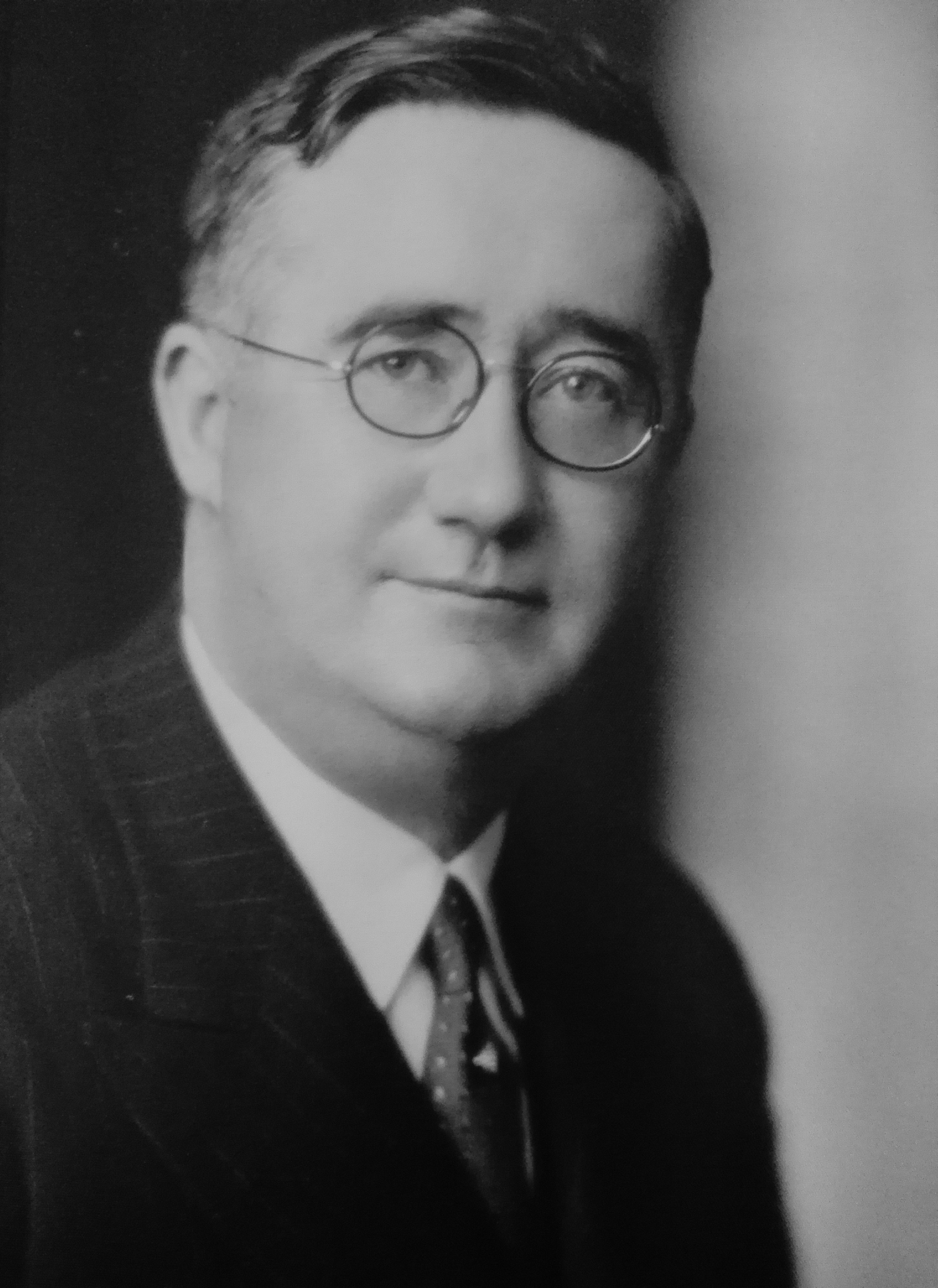
Sir William Appleton

== Order of the Bath ==
=== Companion (CB) ===
Military division

- Commodore Second Class George Walter Gillow Simpson CBE – Royal Navy.

== Order of the British Empire ==
=== Commander (CBE) ===
Civil division

- William James Girling – of Blenheim. For public services, especially in Marlborough Provincial District.
- Gilbert Hutton Grigg – of Hororata. For services to agriculture.
- William Edward Hale – of Maramarua. For services to the dairy industry, particularly as chairman of the New Zealand Dairy Board.
- Arthur Bushby Pearson MD – of Christchurch; pathologist to the Christchurch Hospital Board and examiner in the medical school at Otago University for many years.
- William Norman Perry – of Bruntwood. For services to farming, especially as Dominion president of Federated Farmers Incorporated.

Military division

- Brigadier William Henry Blinman Bull OBE ED KHS MB ChB FRCS – Royal New Zealand Army Medical Corps.
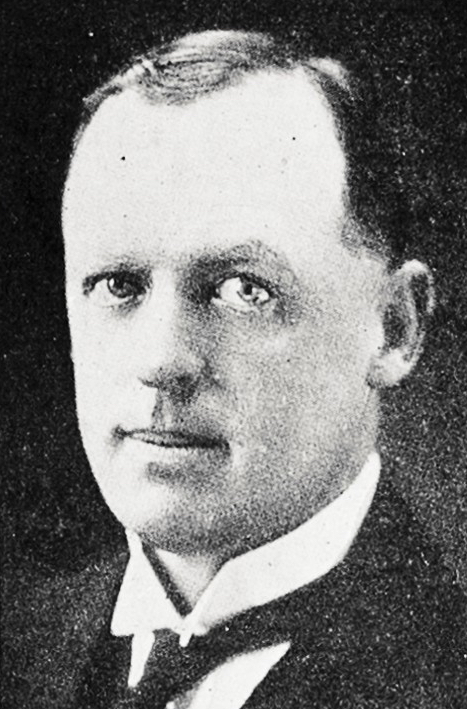
William Girling

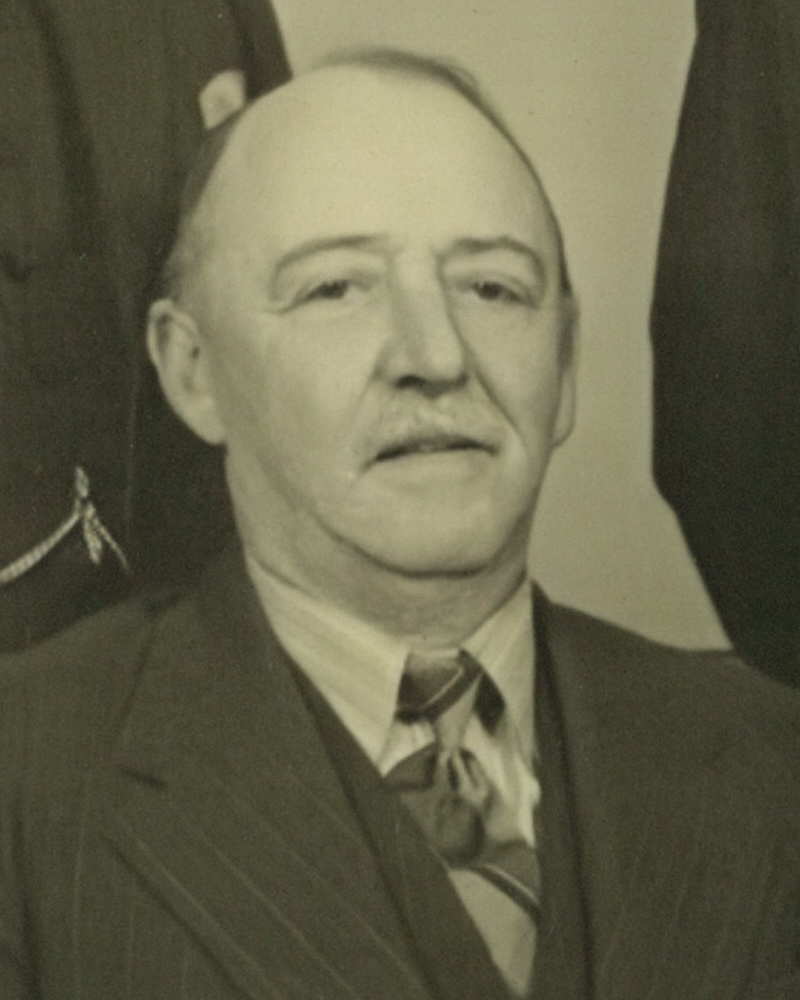
William Hale

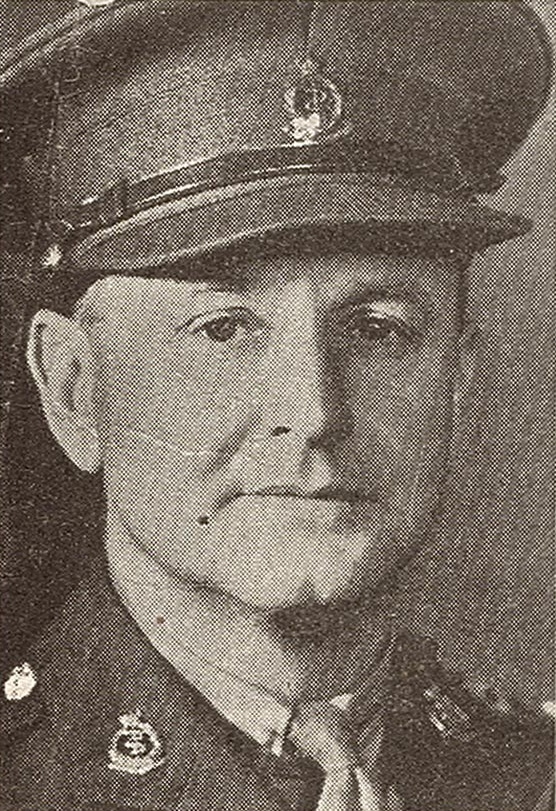
William Bull

=== Officer (OBE) ===
Civil division

- John William Andrews – of Lower Hutt; mayor of Lower Hutt for 15 years.
- William George Belton – of Waverley; president, Counties Association, and chairman, Patea County Council.
- Thomas Oakley William Brebner – His Majesty's New Zealand consul-general at San Francisco.
- Arthur Francis Brooks Broadhurst – of Cambridge; headmaster, St Peter's School, Cambridge.
- Harold David Caro – of Hamilton; mayor of Hamilton.
- Arthur Edward Flower MA MSc – of Fendalton. For services to education.
- Walter Arnold Hadlee – of Christchurch. For services in the field of sport.
- Enoch Bruce Levy – of Palmerston North. For services to agriculture in connection with grassland research.
- Gordon Edward George Minhinnick – of Auckland; a prominent cartoonist.
- Douglas Warren Russell – of Christchurch. For services to ex-servicemen.
- Charles William Tyler – of Rangiora; mayor of Rangiora.

Military division

- Lieutenant-Colonel John Brooke-White – Royal New Zealand Engineers.
- Wing Commander Arthur Beale Greenaway – Royal New Zealand Air Force.
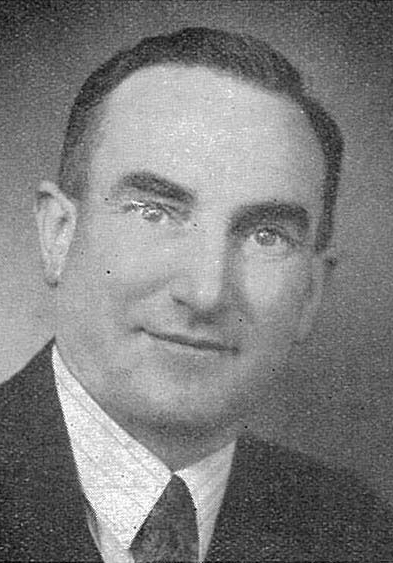
Jack Andrews

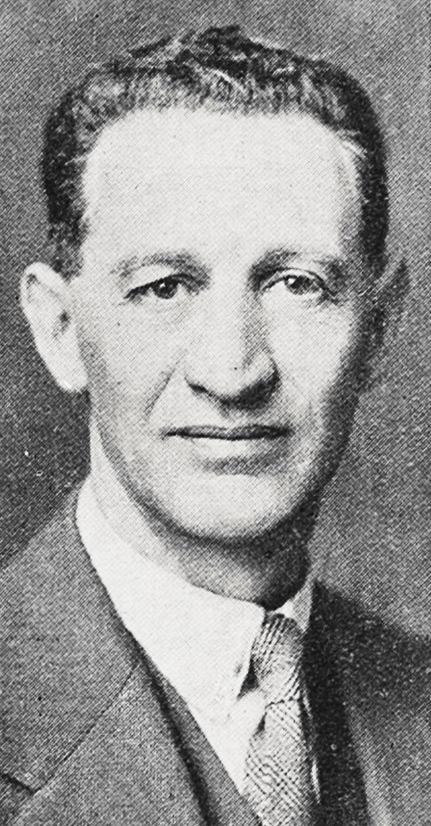
Harold Caro

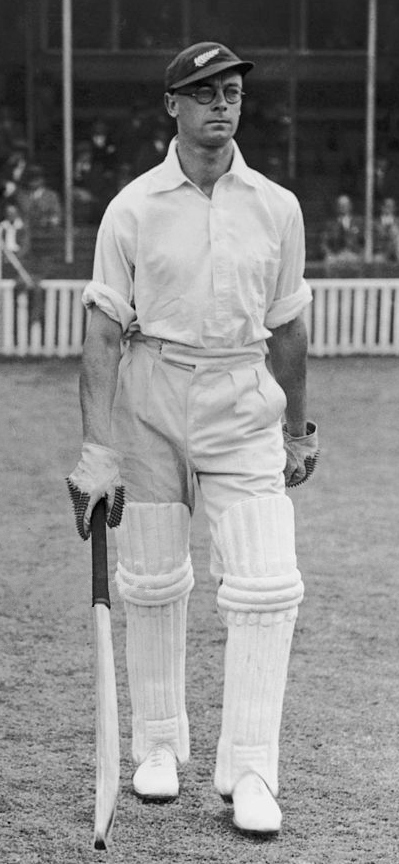
Walter Hadlee

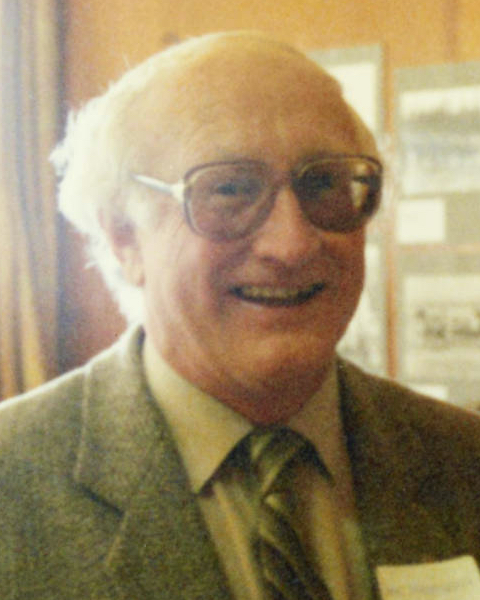
Gordon Minhinnick

=== Member (MBE) ===
Civil division

- Eileen Kate Nesta Adams – of Clevedon; Dominion president, women's section, Federated Farmers Incorporated.
- Alberta Allison Boland – of Waimate. For patriotic and social welfare services.
- Walter John Majendie Bourchier – of Onehunga. For services to ex-servicemen's organisations.
- Elizabeth Coats – of Remuera. For social welfare services.
- John Robin Harris Cooksey – of Rissington, Hawke's Bay; Dominion commissioner for training for boy scouts since 1936.
- Margaret Bain Coutts JP – of Paremata. For social welfare services, especially to backward children.
- Randolph James Estall – of Christchurch. For outstanding services as conductor of Woolston Band.
- The Reverend Thomas Halliday – of Auckland; convenor of the Auckland City Metropolitan Relief and Auckland Presbyterian Social Services Association.
- Milly Ruby Hudson – of Dunedin. For social-welfare services.
- John James Henry Lauder – of Auckland; superintendent, His Majesty's Prison, Auckland.
- Fred Purnell JP – of Marton; mayor of Marton.
- Wilfrid Dalton Shelton – of Gore. For municipal and patriotic services.
- James Cleland Hall Somerville – of Dunedin. For services to the School Committees' Association and the Otago Boys' High School board.
- Morris Stewart Spence – of Napier; president, Hawke's Bay Art Gallery and Museum.
- The Reverend Canon Paora Temuera – of Ōtaki. For services to the Māori people.
- Clifford Simeon Thompson – of Christchurch; treasurer, Canterbury School Committees' Association.

Military division

- Archibald Bazil Cox – Temporary Senior Commissioned Gunner, Royal New Zealand Navy.
- Warrant Officer 2nd Class James John Bergman – Royal New Zealand Armoured Corps.
- Major Hubert Waters Jacka – Royal New Zealand Engineers.
- Captain Reginald Frederick Joyce – New Zealand Regiment.
- Flight Lieutenant Ronald Arthur Manners – Royal New Zealand Air Force.

== British Empire Medal (BEM) ==
Military division

- Chief Petty Officer Telegraphist Adrian Frederick Bywater Lutman – Royal New Zealand Navy.
- Petty Officer Leonard Fullerton – Royal New Zealand Naval Volunteer Reserve.
- Staff Sergeant (temporary Warrant Officer 2nd Class) David James Abel – New Zealand Army.
- Sergeant George Eltringham – Royal New Zealand Army Medical Corps.
- Sergeant David John Caughley – Royal New Zealand Air Force.

== Air Force Cross (AFC) ==
- Squadron Leader Reginald Yates Powell DFC – Royal Air Force.
