= 1967 New Year Honours (New Zealand) =

Annual awards for New Zealanders

The 1967 New Year Honours in New Zealand were appointments by Elizabeth II on the advice of the New Zealand government to various orders and honours to reward and highlight good works by New Zealanders. The awards celebrated the passing of 1966 and the beginning of 1967, and were announced on 1 January 1967.

The recipients of honours are displayed here as they were styled before their new honour.

== Knight Bachelor ==
- The Honourable George Innes McGregor – senior puisne judge of the Supreme Court of New Zealand.
- Harvey Turner CBE – of Auckland. For services to the fruit and produce industry.

== Order of the Bath ==
=== Companion (CB) ===
Military division

- Rear-Admiral John O'Connell Ross CBE – Royal New Zealand Navy.

== Order of Saint Michael and Saint George ==
=== Companion (CMG) ===
- The Honourable Henry Greathead Rex Mason QC – of Wellington. For public services.
- The Right Reverend Alwyn Keith Warren MC – lately Bishop of Christchurch.
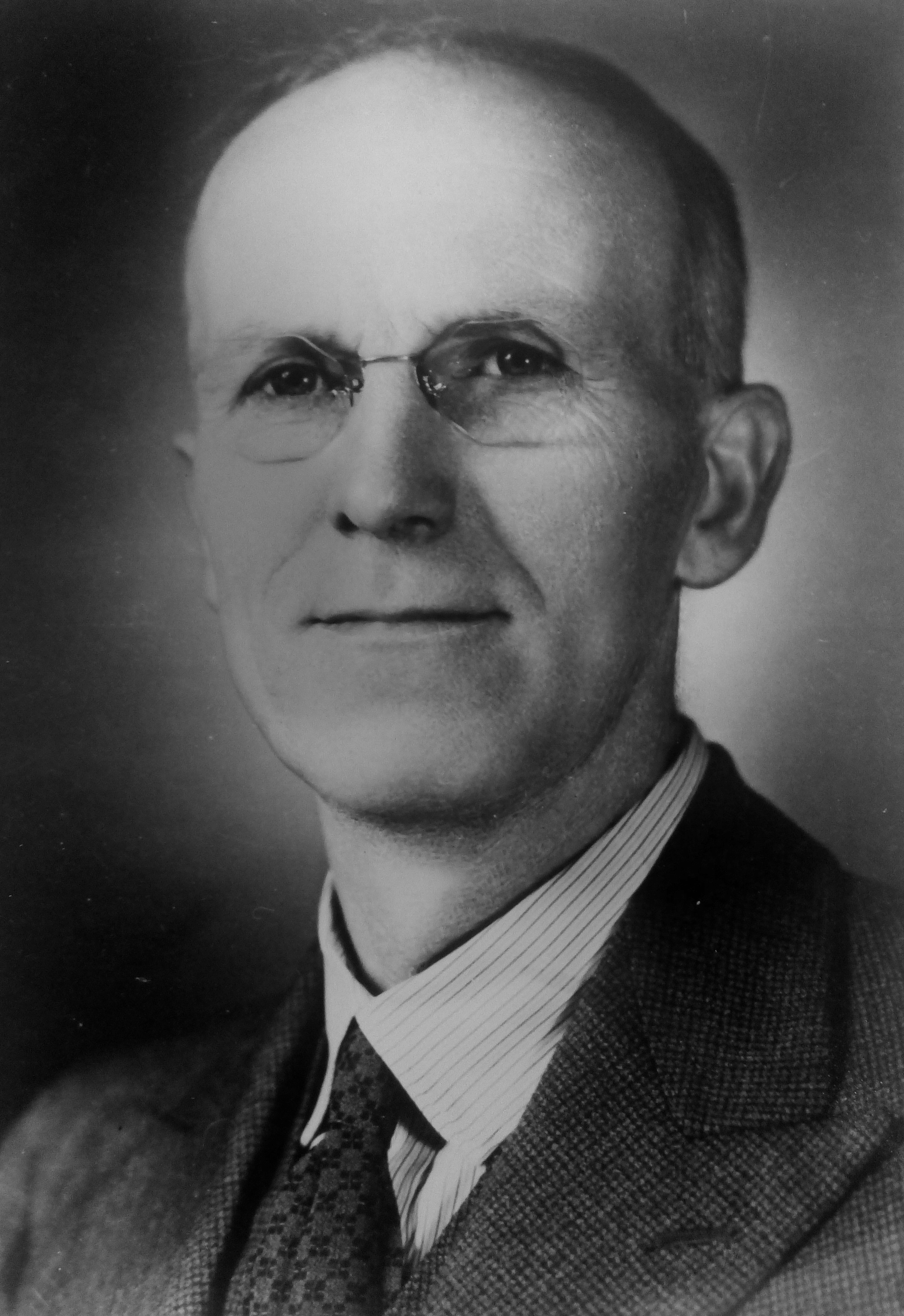
Rex Mason

== Order of the British Empire ==
=== Knight Commander (KBE) ===
Civil division

- Clifford Ulric Plimmer – of Lower Hutt. For services to business, industry and in public affairs.

=== Commander (CBE) ===
Civil division

- Eoin Robert Garden – of Dunedin. For valuable services in the field of engineering.
- Wilton Ernest Henley MBE BCh FRCP – of Auckland. For valuable services to medicine.
- Eric William McCallum. For services to farming, especially as president of the Federated Farmers of New Zealand.
- Carl Leslie Spencer CVO – Commissioner of Police.

Military division

- Air Commodore Percival Patrick O'Brien OBE – Royal New Zealand Air Force.

=== Officer (OBE) ===
Civil division

- Ernest Philip Aderman – of New Plymouth. For public and political services.
- Thomas Harcourt Clarke Caughey JP. For community services, especially as chairman of the Auckland Hospital Board.
- John Herbert Hall – of Wellington. For services to the community in journalism, broadcasting and welfare work.
- William Greig Macartney – of Christchurch. For services to the dairy industry.
- Elizabeth Bamford Orbell – of Rotorua. For services to nursing.
- Manahi Nitama Paewai MB ChB. For services to the Māori people in the Kaikohe district.
- Beryl Sidey – of Dunedin. For services to the community, especially in the kindergarten and Girl Guide movements.
- Harold Parnwell Smith – of Christchurch. For services to local government.
- John Arthur Steele JP – of Auckland. For services to the community and local government.
- Peter Tait JP – mayor of Napier.

Military division

- Surgeon Commander Harman Gilbert Smith VRD MB FRCS – Royal New Zealand Naval Volunteer Reserve.
- Lieutenant-Colonel James Warne Ardagh – Royal New Zealand Army Medical Corps (Territorial Force).
- Wing Commander Ralph Crowther Jones – Royal New Zealand Air Force.
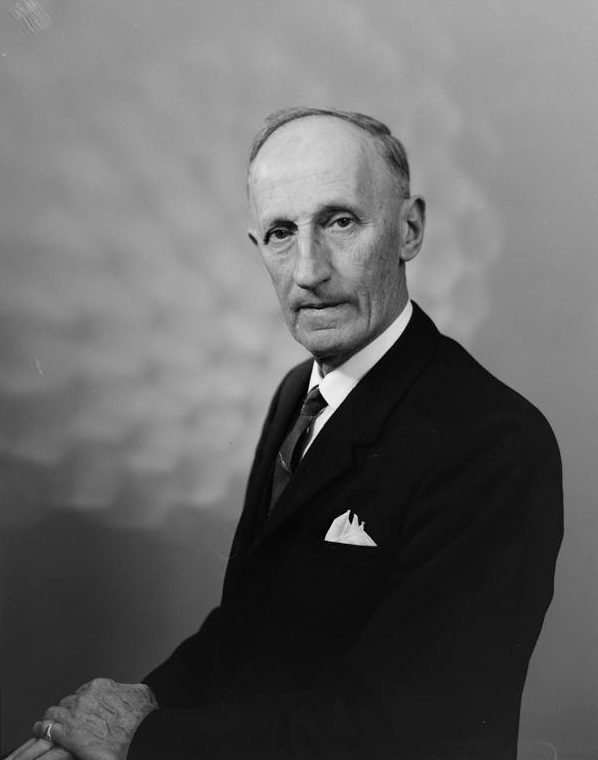
Ernie Aderman

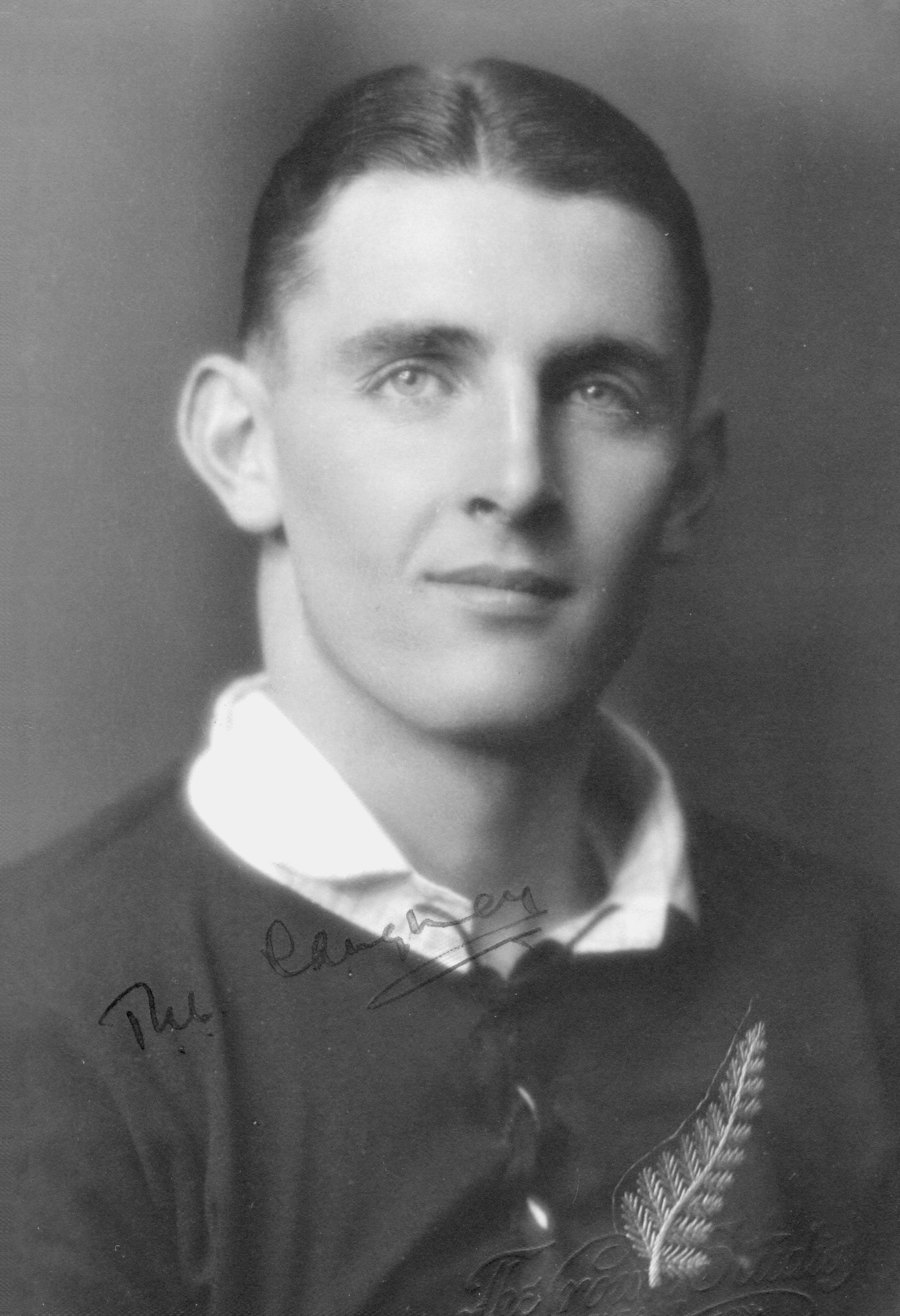
Harcourt Caughey

=== Member (MBE) ===
Civil division

- Donald Clarebrough Butler – chairman of the Whakatane County Council.
- Cyril Stewart Davies – of Geraldine. For services to the community and local government.
- James Dempsey JP – chairman of the Taumarunui County Council.
- Betsy Robertson Eyre JP – of Nelson. For services to the community and local government.
- Alfred Charles Lindsay Fooks. For services to engineering, especially as project engineer of the Wairakei Geothermal Power Project.
- Harold Owen Hills JP – mayor of Kaiapoi.
- Elizabeth Margaret Creighton Little – lately senior nurse inspector, Hamilton.
- Roy Vincent McLachlan – of Otago. For services to the community and local government.
- George Melville JP – town clerk, Milton.
- Gwynneth Nelson – of Dannevirke. For services to local government.
- Dorothy Martha Parfitt – of Greymouth. For services to the community in welfare and local-body work.
- Kathleen Reeve-Smith JP – of Te Kūiti. For community services for many years.
- Araitia Tepuretu – president of the Cook Islands Returned Services' Association.
- Mabel Christina Wachner – of Invercargill. For community welfare services.
- Thomas Albert Wilson – of Waimate. For services to the community and local government.
- Charles Woods. For services to the community, especially as general secretary of the Palmerston North branch of the Young Men's Christian Association.

Military division

- Lieutenant Commander (Special) Arthur Kenneth Griffith – Royal New Zealand Naval Volunteer Reserve.
- Major Frederick Betton Bath – Royal New Zealand Artillery (Regular Force).
- Major John Brooke – Royal New Zealand Infantry Regiment (Regular Force).
- Warrant Officer Class I Charles William Grotty – Royal New Zealand Infantry Regiment (Regular Force).
- Captain John Digby Ireland – Royal New Zealand Corps of Signals (Territorial Force).
- Flying Officer Denis Alexander Gable – Royal New Zealand Air Force.
- Warrant Officer Vivian John Cosgrave – Royal New Zealand Air Force.

== Companion of the Imperial Service Order (ISO) ==
- John Charles Carew Edwards – chief traffic superintendent.

== British Empire Medal (BEM) ==
Civil division, for gallantry

- Edward Charles Marchant – prison officer, Auckland Prison.
- Walter Weir – prison officer, Auckland Prison. For courage and devotion to duty during riots in Auckland Prison.

Civil division, for meritorious service

- George Philp Ogilvie – constable, New Zealand Police Force.

Military division

- Able Seaman Richard Francis Anderson – Royal New Zealand Navy.
- Master at Arms Graeme Mervyn Cooke – Royal New Zealand Navy.
- Chief Visual Instructor Lindsay David Glassey – Royal New Zealand Navy.
- Chief Petty Officer (Acting) (Local) Brian Neville Reed – Royal New Zealand Navy.
- Staff Sergeant George Francis William Lewis – Royal New Zealand Army Service Corps (Regular Force).
- Staff Sergeant Leslie Mullane – Royal New Zealand Army Ordnance Corps (Regular Force).
- Flight Sergeant William McArthur – Royal New Zealand Air Force.
- Sergeant Kenneth Stanley Piper – Royal New Zealand Air Force.
- Sergeant Edwin Bertram Wood – Royal New Zealand Air Force.

== Air Force Cross (AFC) ==
- Flight Lieutenant John Alfred Hall – Royal New Zealand Air Force.

== Queen's Police Medal (QPM) ==
- Andrew Reid – detective senior sergeant, New Zealand Police Force.
- George Colin Urquhart BEM – assistant commissioner, New Zealand Police Force.
- Garrett Hogan – detective sergeant, New Zealand Police Force.

== Queen's Fire Services Medal (QFSM) ==
- William George Grey – chief fire officer, Marton Volunteer Fire Brigade.
- Cecil Alister Nightingale – chief fire officer, Oamaru Volunteer Fire Brigade.

== Queen's Commendation for Valuable Service in the Air ==
- Flight Lieutenant Thomas Sydney Lambert – Royal New Zealand Air Force.
