= Bruce Levy =

New Zealand botanist (1892–1985)

Sir Enoch Bruce Levy OBE (19 February 1892 – 16 October 1985) was a botanist from New Zealand who became widely known for his work on improving pastures.

== Biography ==
Levy was born in Auckland in 1892, and lived on a farm until he was 18 years old. He joined the New Zealand Department of Agriculture in 1911, and studied science at Victoria University in Wellington from 1926 to 1928. In 1925 he married schoolteacher Phyllis Rosa Kate Mason.

In 1937 he founded the Grasslands Division of the Department of Scientific and Industrial Research, and was Director of that division until he retired in 1951. During that time he travelled all over New Zealand, helping farmers to improve their pastures based on techniques that he had learned in Europe. After retiring, he worked on improving the turf of golf courses and bowling greens.

Levy was the author of Construction, Renovation and Care of the Bowling Green (1949); Construction, Renovation and Care of the Golf Course (1950); and Grasslands of New Zealand (1951).

In the 1950 King's Birthday Honours, he was made an Officer of the Order of the British Empire, for services to agriculture in connection with grassland research. He was appointed a Knight Bachelor in the 1953 Coronation Honours.
