= Shepherds Bush Housing Association =

Charity based in London, England

Shepherds Bush Housing Group
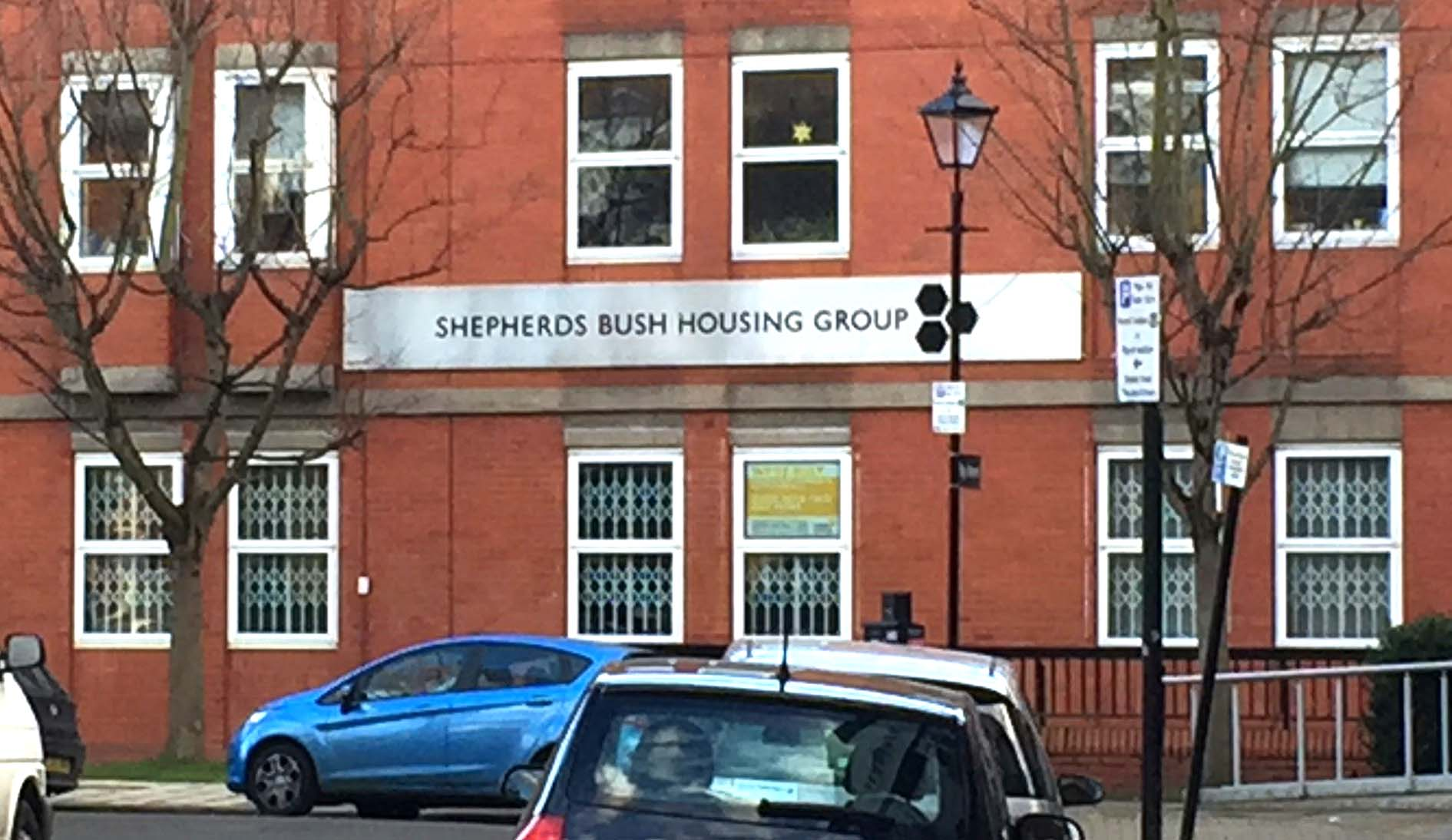
- Shepherds Bush Housing Group, February 2018
- Founded: 1966
- Founder: Reverend John Asbridge
- Type: Housing Association
- Purpose: Housing
- Location: London, W4
- Region served: London

Shepherds Bush Housing Group is made up of two brands: Shepherds Bush Housing Association and BE WEST. Shepherds Bush Housing Association is a housing association based in west London. The Shepherds Bush Housing Association was first established in 1966 by Reverend John Asbridge, vicar of St Stephen's Church, Shepherd's Bush, who sought with his parishioners a means to "acquire and administer property for letting to needy families." By the early 2000s the SBHA owned and managed more than 5,000 homes. In mid 2023 it was reported that the SBHA might merge, or be taken over by, The Guinness Partnership, following a "breach of economic standards".

== History ==
In the early 1960s members of St Stephen's Church, Shepherd's Bush were concerned about the poor conditions in which many parishioners lived. Vicar Reverend John Asbridge led a group of individuals, drawn from the parish and elsewhere, to "acquire and administer property for letting to needy families." The trust's first property was 220 Hammersmith Grove, a handsome but rather run-down four-storey building which was converted into four flats.

The choir vestry at St Stephen’s was used as an office, which was run by volunteers from the parish. In addition, help was given by a number of parishioners who gifted their own houses to the association for use by homeless people.

Asbridge ran the Association for 20 years, retiring in 1988. By the early 21st century the Shepherd's Bush Housing Association owned and managed more than 5,000 homes.

In 2022 the UK Government's Regulator of Social Housing (RSH) published a regulatory judgement with regard to the Shepherds Bush Housing Association, after finding a "breach of economic standards". The Regulator "downgraded the provider for non-compliance with the governance element of the Governance and Financial Viability Standard". In May 2023 it was reported that The Guinness Partnership was likely to take over the work of the Shepherd's Bush Housing Association, after the latter was found to be "non-compliant with the Regulator of Social Housing’s governance and financial viability standard". Guinness and Shepherd's Bush Housing Association could potentially merge.
