= Frank Callaghan =

New Zealand teacher, agricultural instructor, scientific administrator (1891–1980)

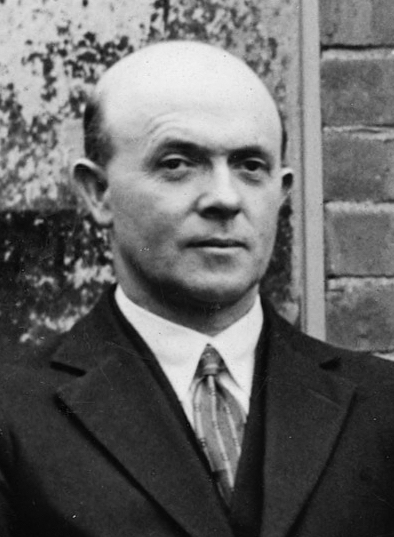
Callaghan in 1936

Francis Raymond Callaghan ISO (15 April 1891 – 10 March 1980) was a New Zealand teacher, agricultural instructor and scientific administrator.

Callaghan was born on 15 April 1891 at Lincoln. He completed a master's thesis at Canterbury University College in 1914.

He succeeded Ernest Marsden as secretary of the Department of Scientific and Industrial Research (DSIR). He was president of the Royal Society of New Zealand. He retired in 1953 and was appointed a Companion of the Imperial Service Order in the 1953 Coronation Honours. He also received the Queen Elizabeth II Coronation Medal.

Callaghan died on 10 March 1980 in the Christchurch suburb of Halswell.
