= St Stephen's Church, Shepherd's Bush =

Coordinates: 51.5058°N 0.2290°W

St Stephen and St Thomas
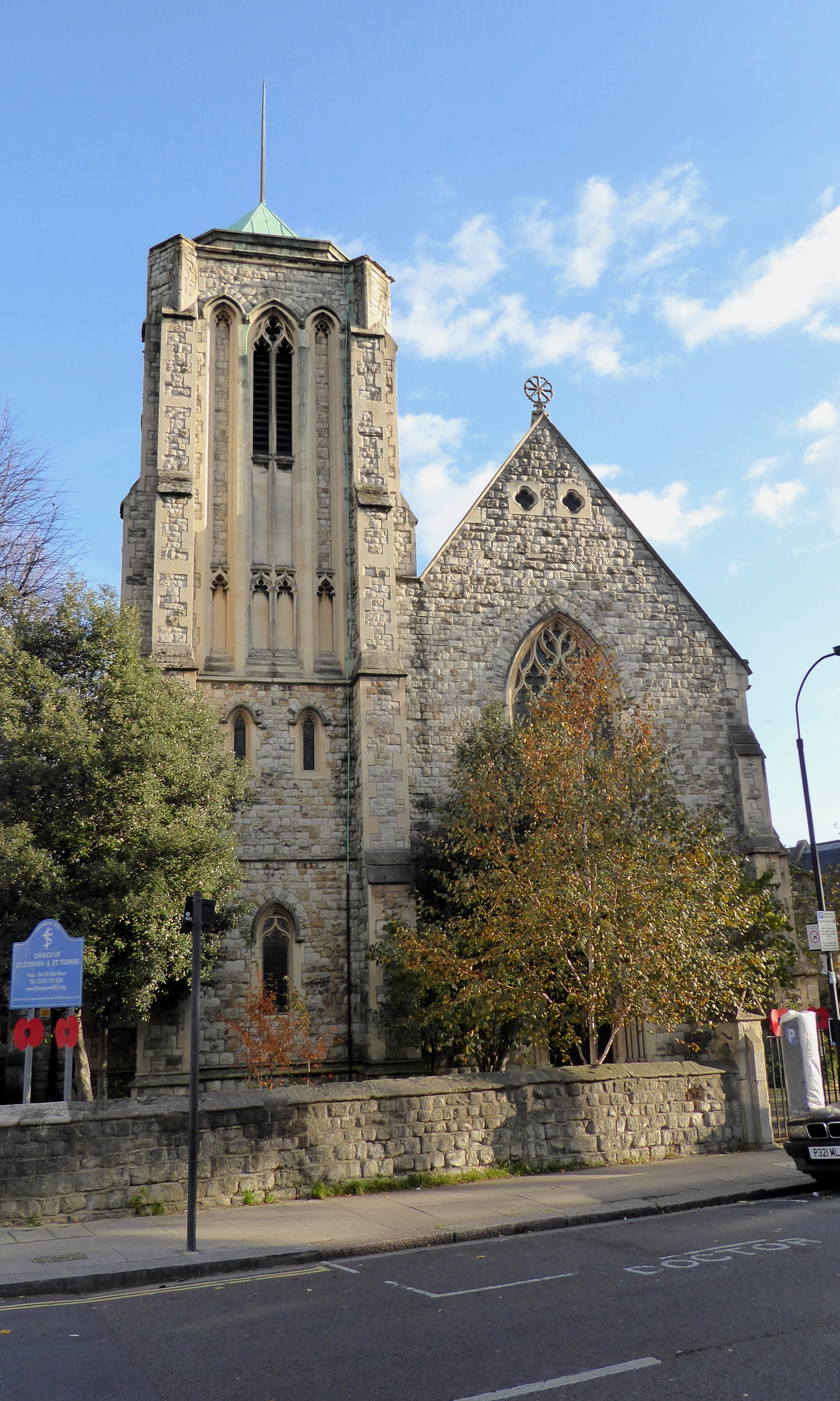
- Church of St Stephen and St Thomas, Shepherd's Bush
- St Stephen and St Thomas
- Location: Uxbridge Road, London
- Country: England
- Denomination: Church of England

History
- Dedication: St Stephen; St Thomas

Architecture
- Architect: Anthony Salvin
- Style: Victorian Gothic
- Years built: 1849-50

Administration
- Diocese: London
- Parish: St Stephen with St Thomas Shepherds Bush

Clergy
- Vicar: Reverend Denis Adide

The Church of St Stephen and St Thomas is a Church of England parish church in Shepherd's Bush, London. It was built circa 1849–50, designed by architect Anthony Salvin in the Gothic Revival style and is now Grade II listed. The church is located on the south side of Uxbridge Road on the corner of Coverdale Road, to the west of Shepherd's Bush tube station.

In the 1950s St Stephen's welcomed many members of the so-called "Windrush Generation" from the West Indies, and in 1962 the Barbadian-born Reverend Wilfred Wood became curate to St Stephen's, later becoming the Church of England's first black bishop. In 1966 the vicar John Asbridge, frustrated by the chronic shortage of local housing, set up the Shepherds Bush Housing Association. Today St Stephen's ministers to a diverse congregation, and serves a hot meal to up to 100 homeless people every Monday. The church is on Historic England's Heritage at Risk Register and an appeal has been launched to raise funds to repair the roof.

== History ==
St Stephen's Church (c1904) with the original spire

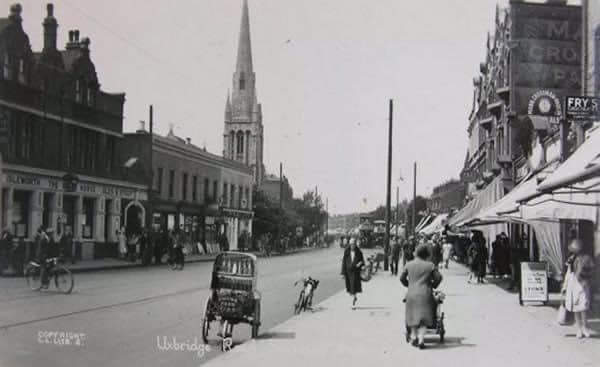
Uxbridge Rd and St Stephen's spire circa 1900

=== 19th-century origins ===
The Church of St Stephen was built circa 1849–50, designed by architect Anthony Salvin, and built in the Gothic Revival style with a tower.

Much of the cost of building the church was borne by Bishop Blomfield. The site for the church was provided in part by James Gomme (d. 1855) who is commemorated in a stained-glass window.

St Stephen's was built as a so-called 'Commissioners' church'; an Anglican church in the United Kingdom built with money voted by Parliament as a result of the Church Building Act 1818, and subsequent related Acts. Such churches have been given a number of titles, including "Commissioners' Churches", "Waterloo Churches" and "Million Act Churches". In some cases the Commissioners provided the full cost of the new church; in other cases they provided a grant and the balance was raised locally.

St Stephen's was built of Kentish Ragstone with Bath stone dressings. It had a "very well developed chancel". The stained-glass windows were manufactured by William Wailes and were donated by members of the clergy and other well-wishers.

The church was consecrated in 1850 and the whole of the parish north of Goldhawk Road was allocated to it. However, by 1870 the expanding population of Shepherd's Bush meant that the church was already overcrowded.

On completion, the periodical The Ecclesiologist, which was strongly in favour of the Gothic Revival movement, commented that the new church:

"has a peculiar value, as indicating how far our diocesan is willing to take the peculiar responsibility of those various features of the arrangements and decoration, which from desuetude had become to a great extent novelties in England when we first advocated their revival".

In 1850 William Cooke became priest in charge of St Stephen's. Cooke was a graduate of Trinity Hall, Cambridge, and a noted hymn-writer and translator.

=== World wars ===
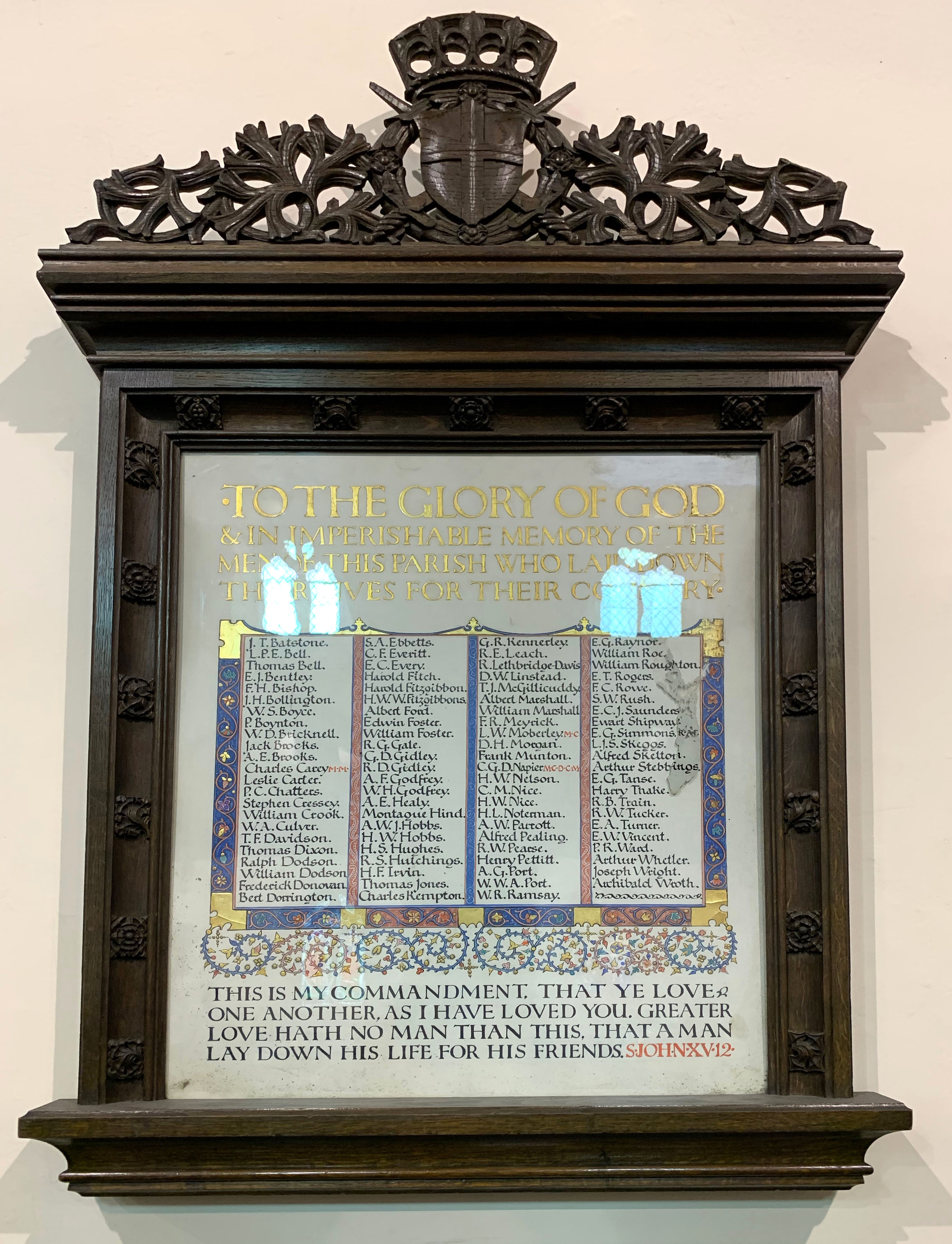
War Memorial in North aisle

91 parishioners of St Stephen's were killed during World War I; their names are recorded in the war memorial inside the church, mounted on the wall of the North aisle. A number were decorated for courage; these included Charles Carey, MM, L. W. Moberley, MC, and Captain Charles George Douglas Napier, MC, DCM (1892 – 15 May 1918). Napier was a flying ace credited with nine aerial victories, flying the Bristol F.2 Fighter, before being himself killed in action. When Napier was awarded his MC, it was noted in the London Gazette that he "displayed the greatest judgment, determination and daring".

The church was hit by enemy bombing in around 1940 or 1941. The spire was damaged, apparently beyond repair. In the same raid the original stained-glass windows on the north aisle of the church were destroyed, as well as the great east and west windows.

=== Post-war era and the Windrush Generation ===
In 1949 scaffolding was erected to effect repairs to the spire, but it could not be saved, and was therefore taken down and replaced by the present structure, a low octagonal copper flèche.

In 1950 centenary celebrations were held, including a "great pageant" and a "centenary dinner", attended by William Wand, the Bishop of London.

In the 1950s many immigrants from the West Indies settled in Shepherds Bush, with St Stephen's becoming known as a church that welcomed what would become known as the Windrush Generation. In 1962 the Barbadian-born Wilfred Wood became curate to St Stephen's. Wood was a lifelong champion of racial justice, who in 1985 became the Church of England's first black bishop. Bishop Wood's influence is still felt today as many West Indian families remain rooted in St Stephen's.

In 1958 the pipe organ, originally made by Henry Willis & Sons in 1888, was moved to the church from St Andrew's, Haverstock Hill, where it was "restored and rebuilt" by N. P. Mander Ltd.

In 1960 the parish was amalgamated with that of St Thomas, forming the new parish of St Stephen's and St Thomas.

The church has a memorial to PC David Wombwell, a police officer who was murdered in 1966 in what became known as the Shepherd's Bush murders.

=== Shepherds Bush Housing Association ===
In 1966 the Rev John Asbridge, vicar of St Stephen's, set up the Shepherds Bush Housing Association, in order to help solve the urgent need for housing for poor parishioners. The choir vestry at St Stephen's was used as an office, which was run by volunteers from the parish. In addition, help was given by a number of parishioners who gifted their own houses to the association for use by homeless people. Their first acquisition was a dilapidated house at 220 Hammersmith Grove, which was converted into flats. Asbridge ran the Association for 20 years, retiring in 1988. Today, the Shepherds Bush Housing Association owns and manages more than 5,000 homes.

In 1970 the church became a Listed Building.

== 21st century ==
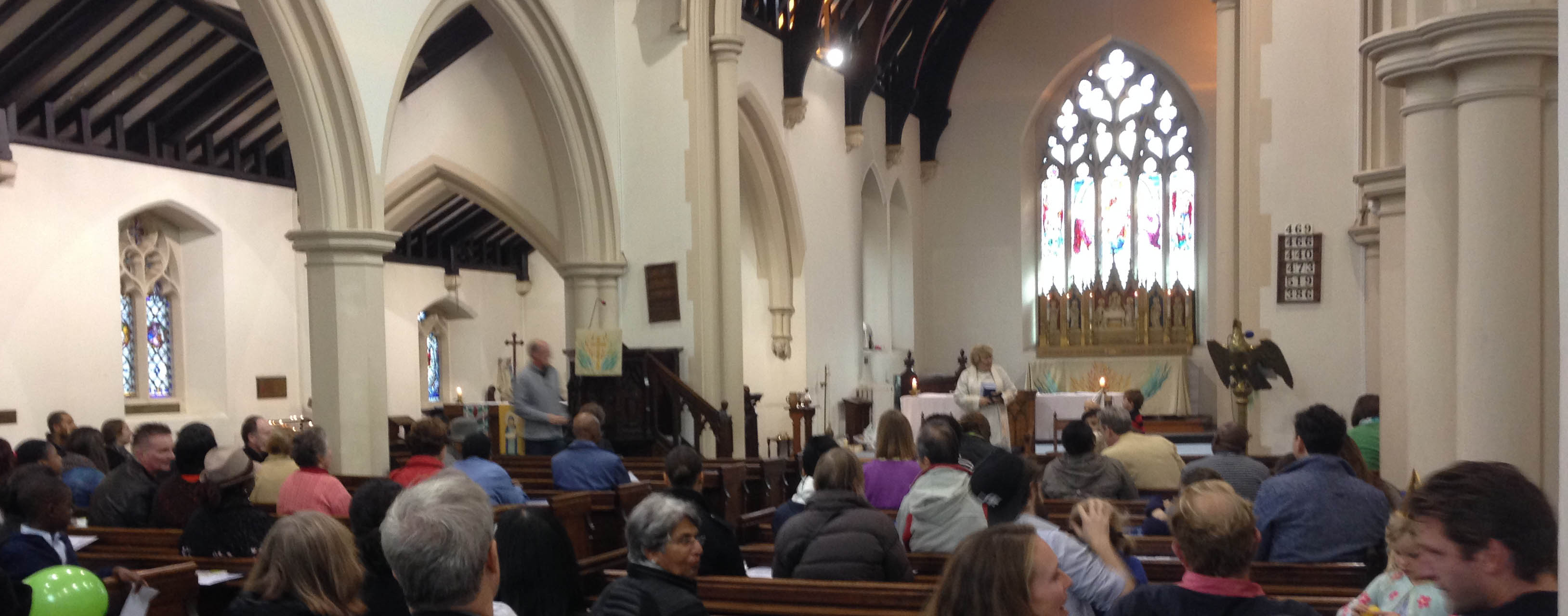
Sunday service in progress

St Stephen's is listed by Historic England in their "Heritage at Risk" category, due to "roofs and rainwater goods ... in poor condition resulting in water ingress". St Stephen's launched an appeal to raise £200,000 to effect repairs.

St Stephen's is closely affiliated with the neighbouring primary school St Stephen's School (Shepherd's Bush).

== Gallery ==
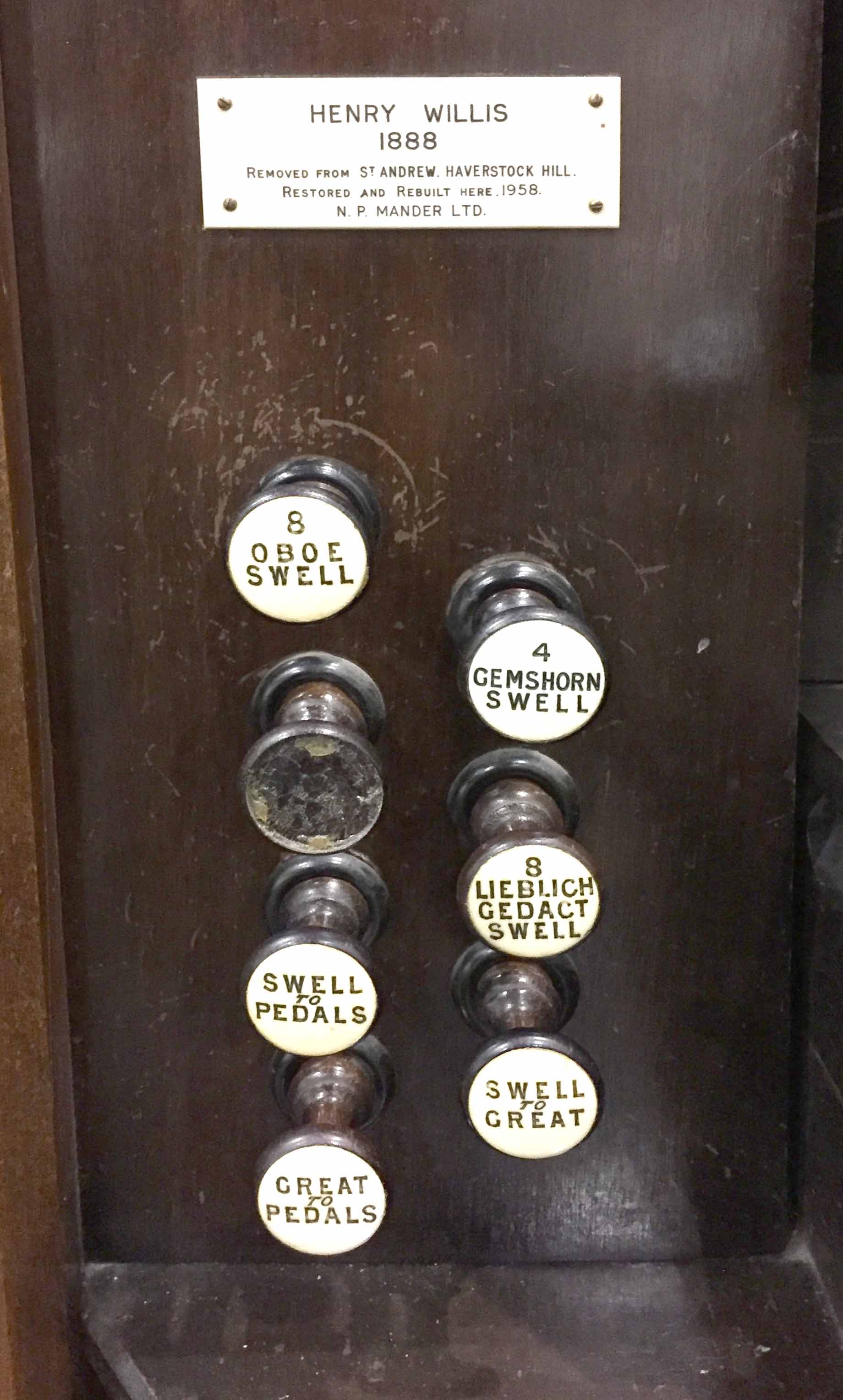
1888 pipe organ by Henry Willis & Sons

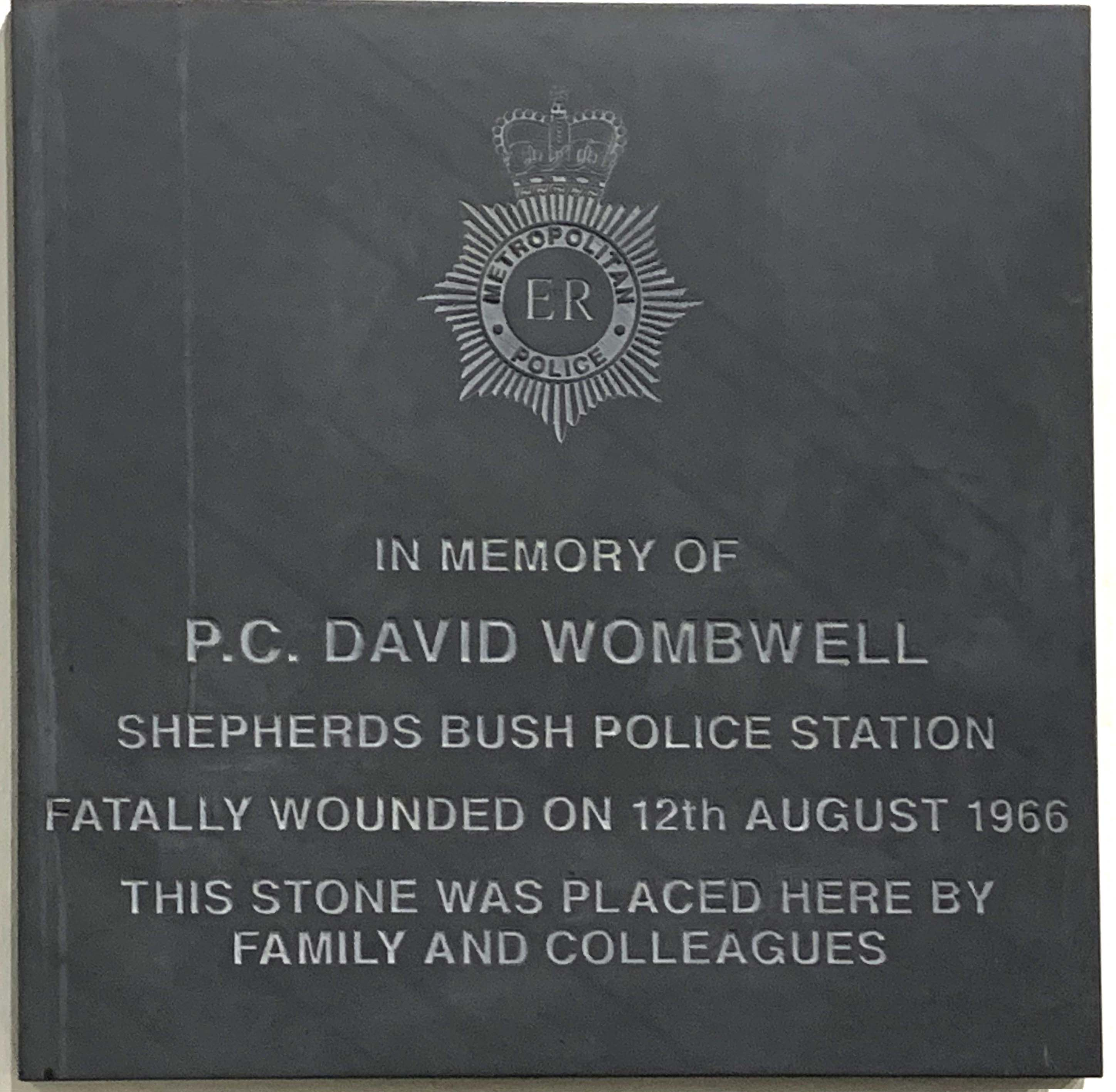
PC David Wombwell memorial plaque

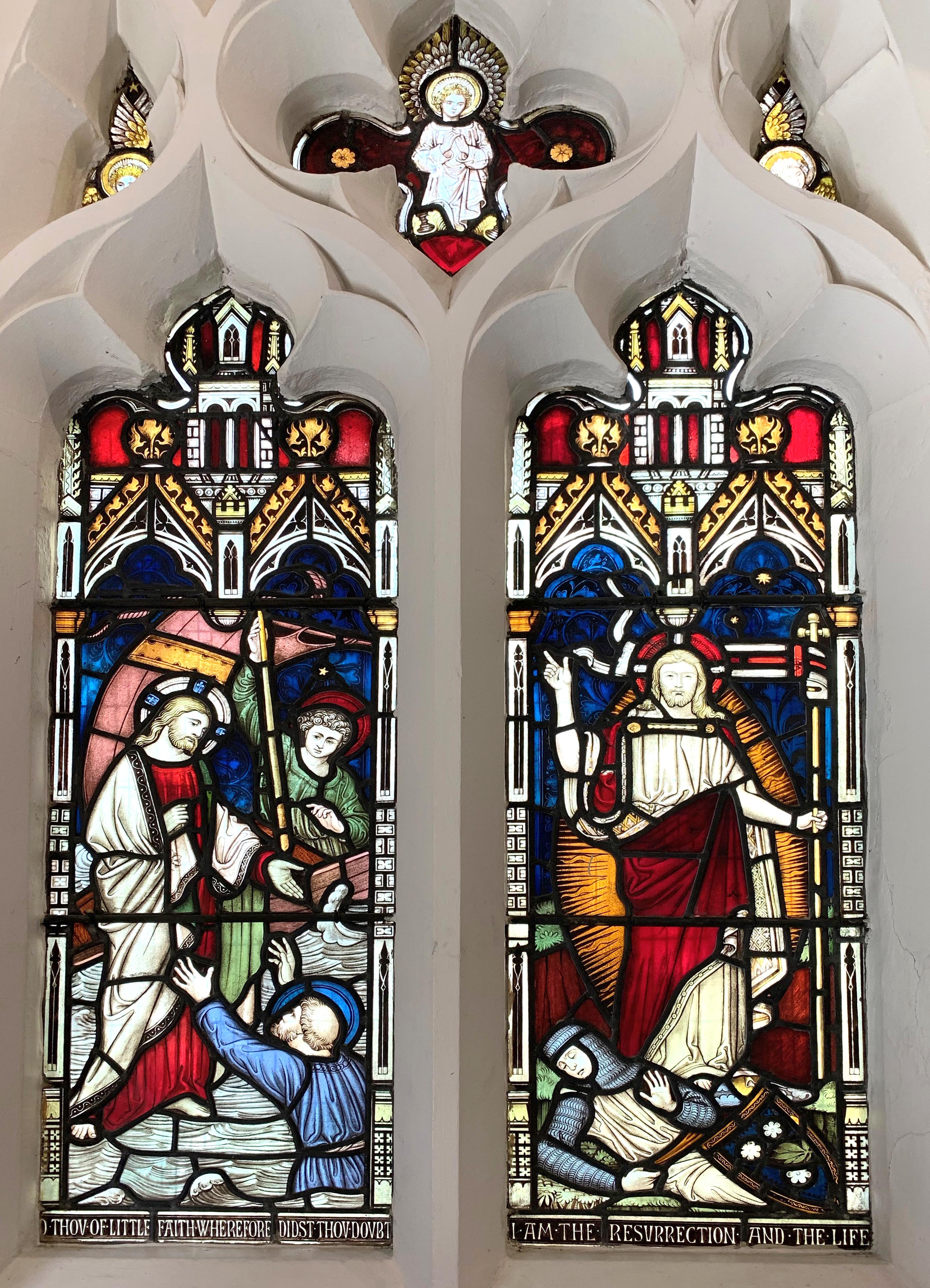
Victorian-era stained glass in West window

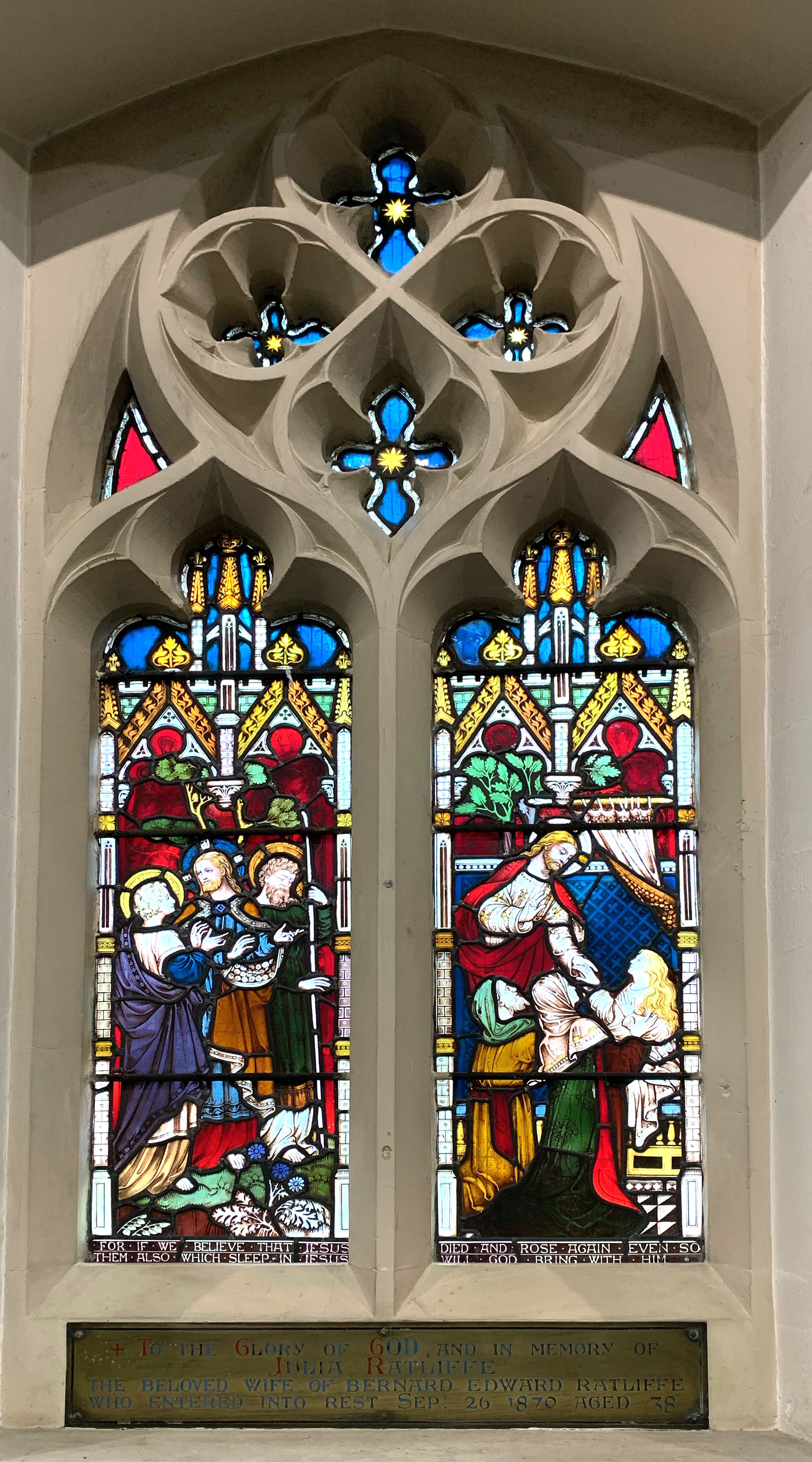
South window dedicated to the memory of Julia Ratliffe, who died on 26 September 1870

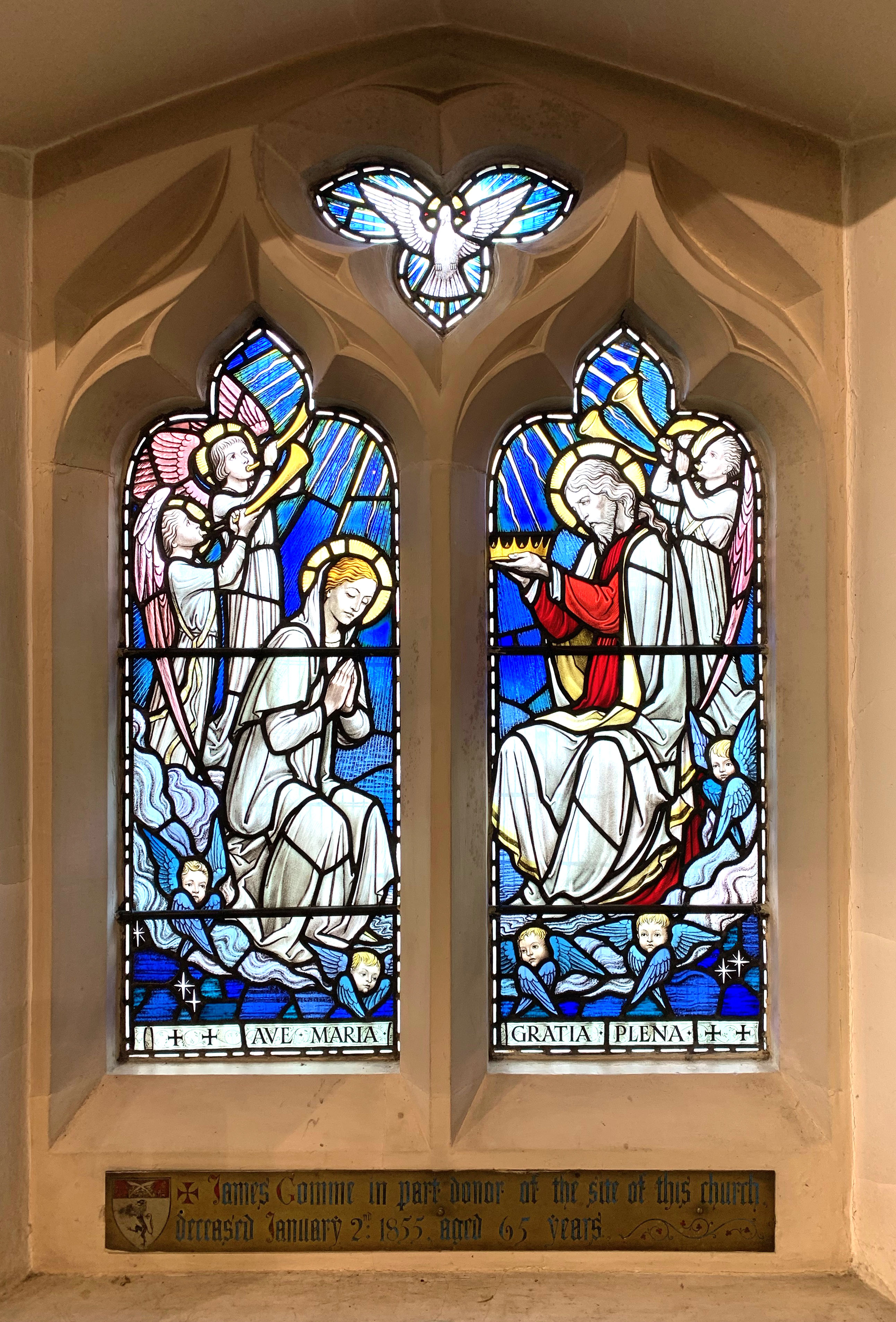
Stained-glass window in memory of James Gomme, benefactor, died 2 January 1855

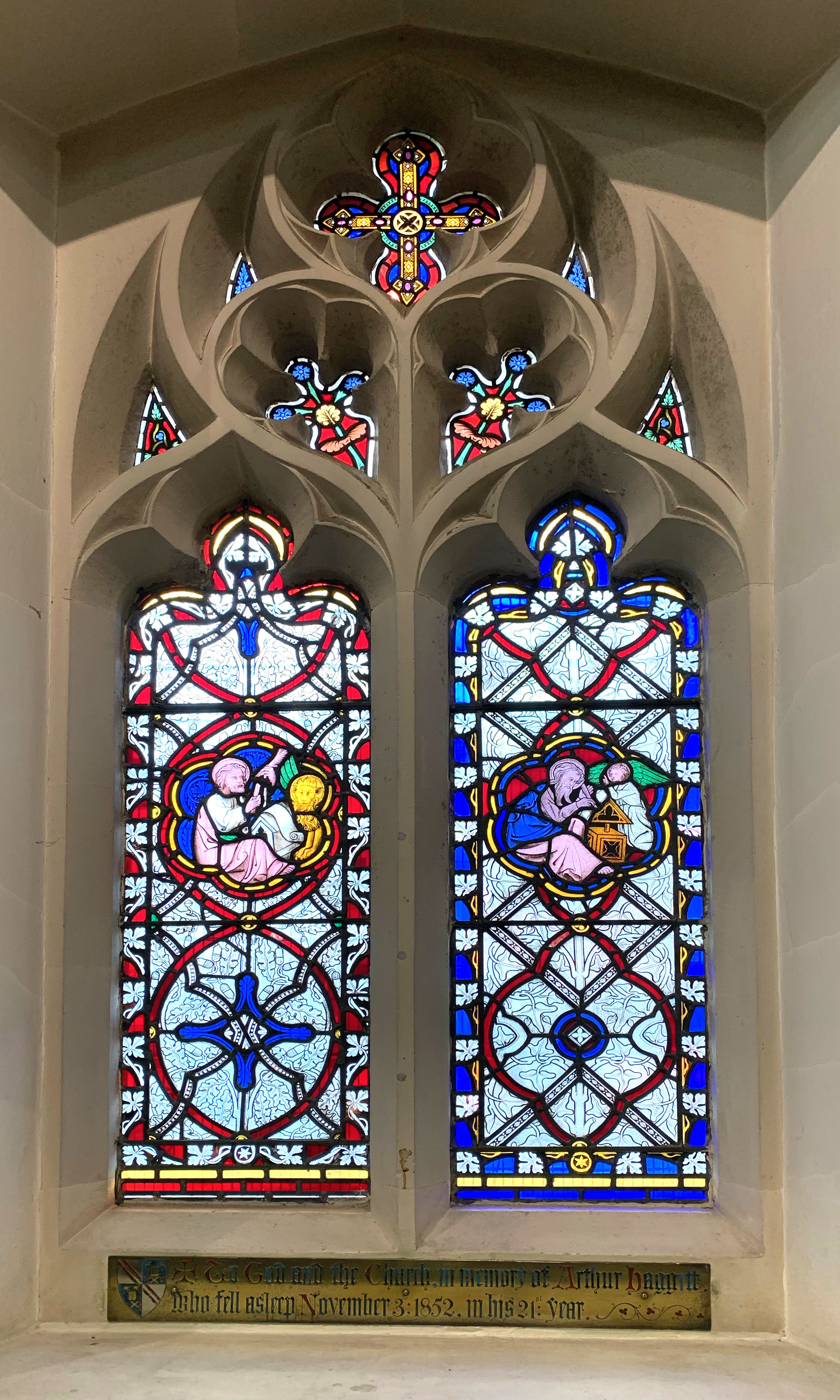
Stained glass in South aisle dedicated to Arthur Haggit, died 3 November 1852

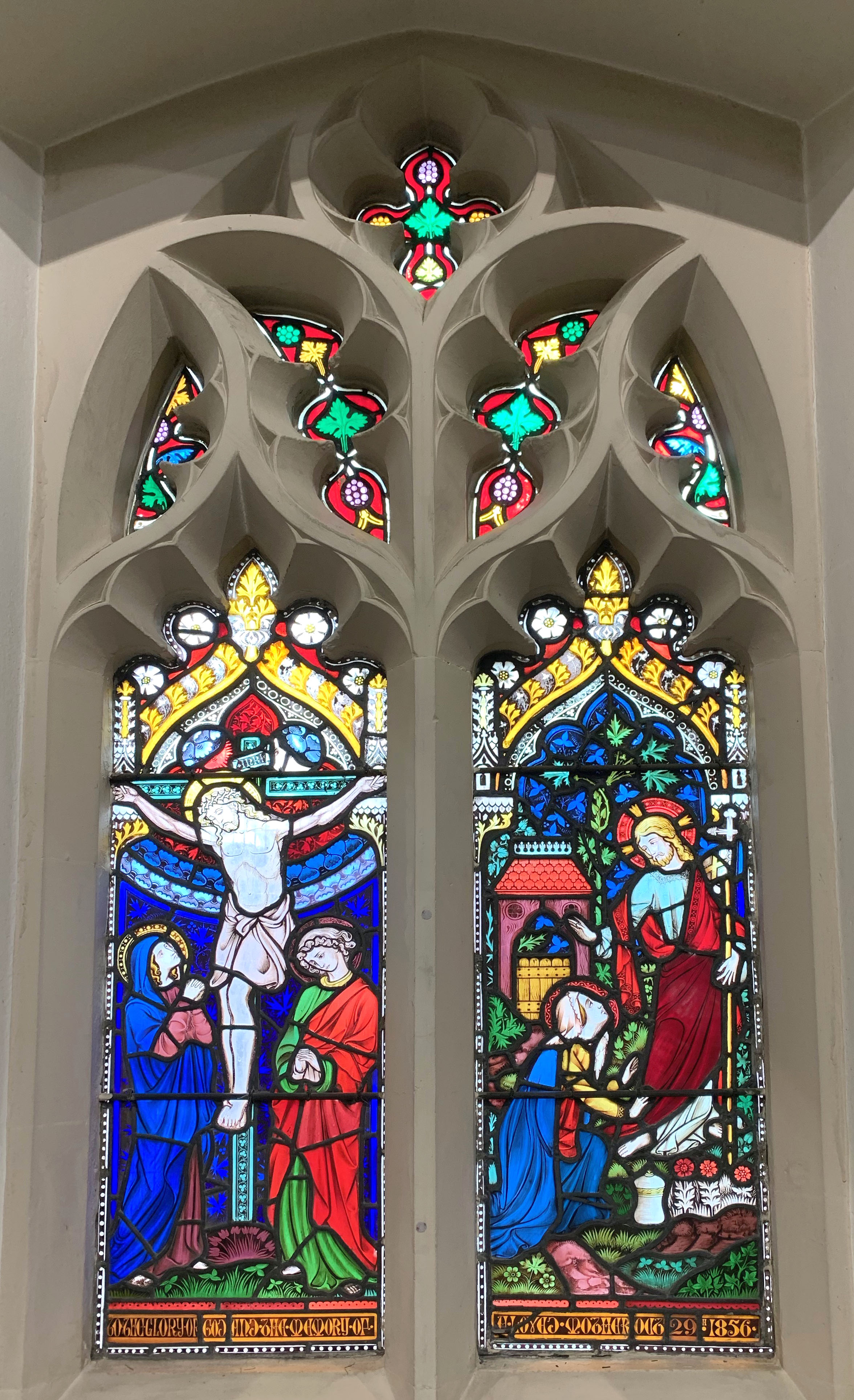
Stained glass in South aisle, 1856

== See also ==
- History of Shepherd's Bush
- List of Commissioners' churches in London
- St Simon's Church, Shepherd's Bush
