= Gordon Minhinnick =

New Zealand cartoonist

Sir Gordon Edward George Minhinnick KBE (13 June 1902 – 19 February 1992) was a New Zealand cartoonist.

He was born at Torpoint, Cornwall, England, educated at Kelly College, Devon, and left for New Zealand in 1921 where he studied architecture for four years. In 1926 he joined the New Zealand Free Lance as cartoonist, but soon transferred to the Christchurch Sun and thence to the Auckland Sun. He joined the New Zealand Herald as a political cartoonist in 1930 and although he officially retired in 1976, contributed cartoons to the newspaper for more than another decade.

In the 1950 King's Birthday Honours, Minhinnick was appointed an Officer of the Order of the British Empire, and in the 1976 Queen's Birthday Honours he was promoted to Knight Commander of the Order of the British Empire), for services as a cartoonist.

== Career ==
Grant (1987) describes Minhinnick as "pre-eminent among New Zealand cartoonists. His work for the country's largest newspaper was widely syndicated and of a consistently high standard; witty rather than barbed, and with a feel for caricature that gave the cartoons an added dimension". Minhinnick was strongly influenced by New Zealand cartoonist David Low, and was offered, but declined, Low's job at the London Evening Standard when Low left the London newspaper in 1949. Minhinnick also taught Les Gibbard (the cartoonist who went on to replace Bill Papas, Low's successor, then at The Guardian) in Auckland during the 1950s.

Minhinnick illustrated several popular New Zealand books ("Murphy's Moa", "From N to Z", "Trout at Taupo", "Four Seasons of Country Diary"), and he regularly published collections of his work (such as "The Minhinnick annual", "Min's Sauce" to "Just a Min").

== Death ==
Minhinnick was buried at Purewa Cemetery in the Auckland suburb of Meadowbank.
