= 1953 Coronation Honours (New Zealand) =

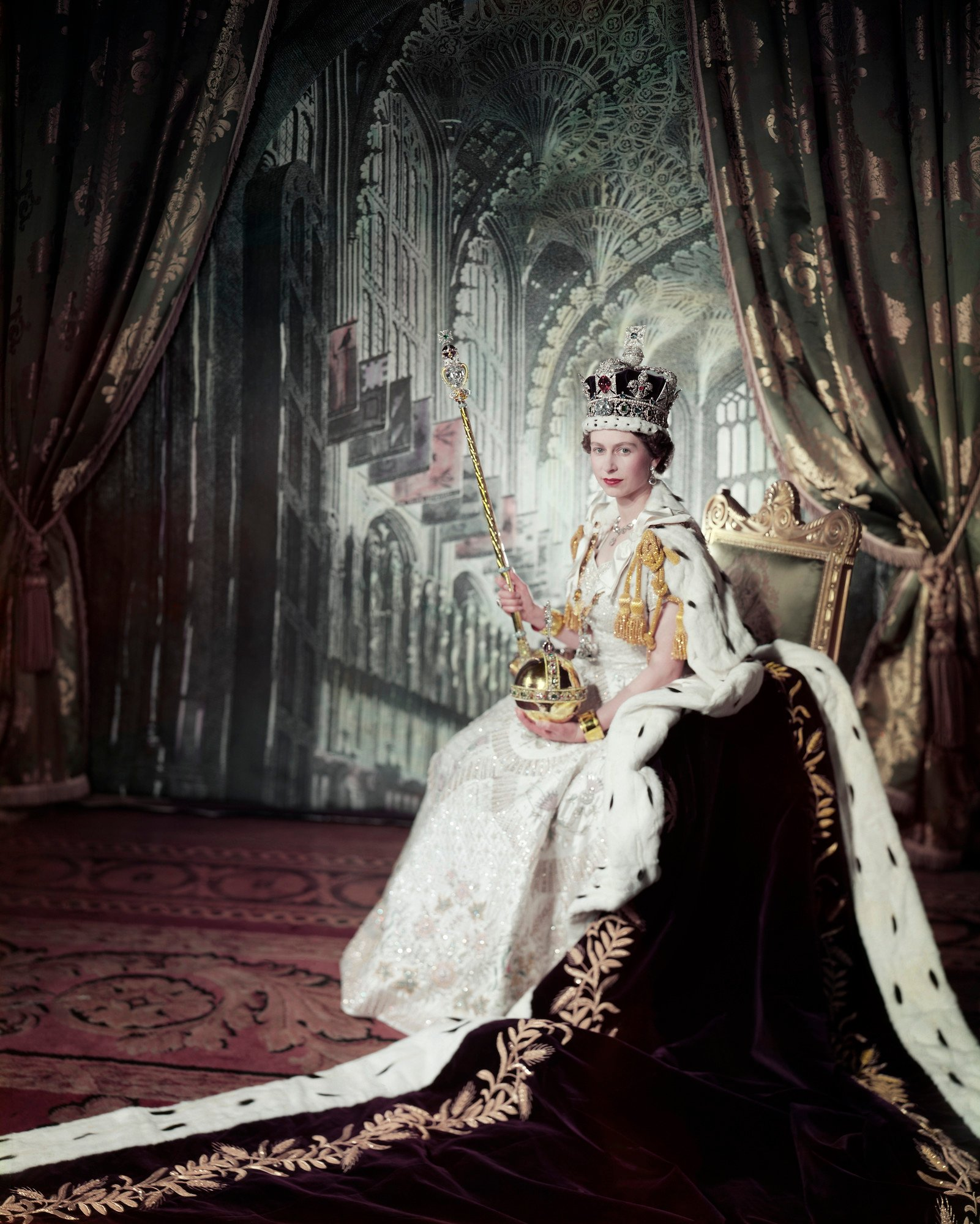
Coronation portrait by Cecil Beaton, 1953

The 1953 Coronation Honours in New Zealand, celebrating the coronation of Elizabeth II, Queen of New Zealand, were appointments made by the Queen on the advice of the New Zealand government to various orders and honours to reward and highlight good works by New Zealanders. Also included were a number of special awards to New Zealand military personnel for operational service in Korea. The honours were announced on 1 June 1953.

The recipients of honours are displayed here as they were styled before their new honour.

== Honorary military appointments ==
- Her Majesty The Queen:

– to be Captain General, Royal New Zealand Artillery
– to be Captain General, Royal New Zealand Armoured Corps
– to be Colonel-in-Chief, Royal New Zealand Engineers
– to be Colonel-in-Chief, Auckland Regiment (Countess of Ranfurly's Own)
– to be Colonel-in-Chief, Wellington Regiment (City of Wellington's Own).

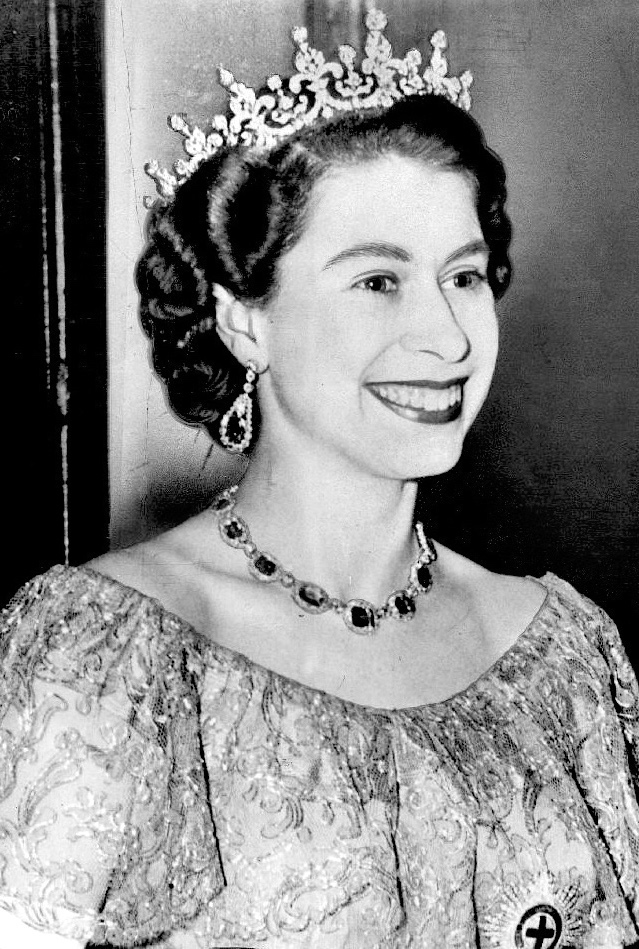
Elizabeth II

== Knight Bachelor ==
- William Goodfellow – of Auckland. For service to the dairy industry.
- Enoch Bruce Levy OBE – of Palmerston North; formerly director of the Grasslands Division, Department of Scientific and Industrial Research.

== Order of the Bath ==
=== Companion (CB) ===
Military division

- Rear-Admiral Frank Arthur Ballance DSO – Chief of Naval Staff, Royal New Zealand Navy.

== Order of Saint Michael and Saint George ==
=== Companion (CMG) ===
- Richard Mitchelson Campbell – formerly of Wellington; chairman of the Public Service Commission.
- Philip Stanley Foster MB FRCS – of Christchurch, a prominent surgeon.
- The Honourable Robert Masters – of Stratford. For public services.
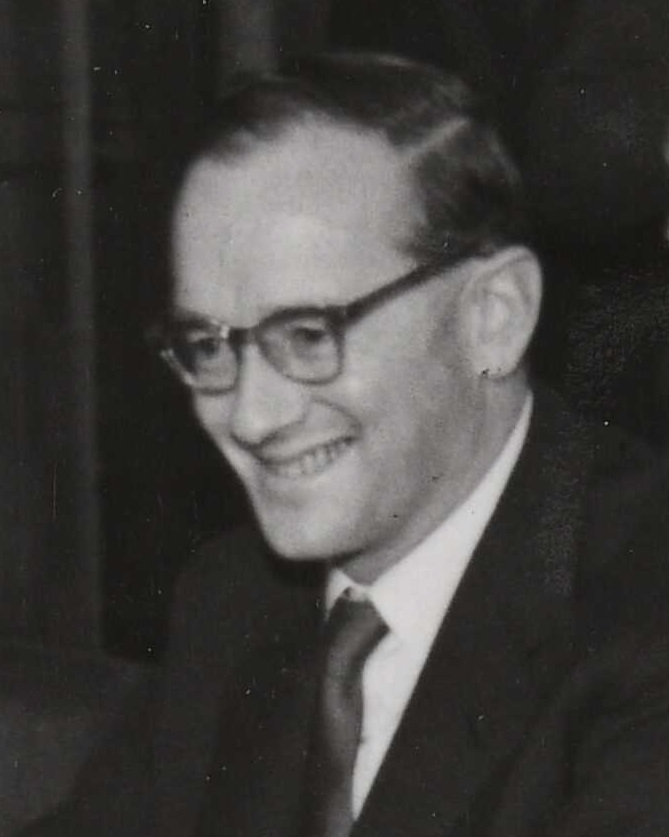
Dick Campbell

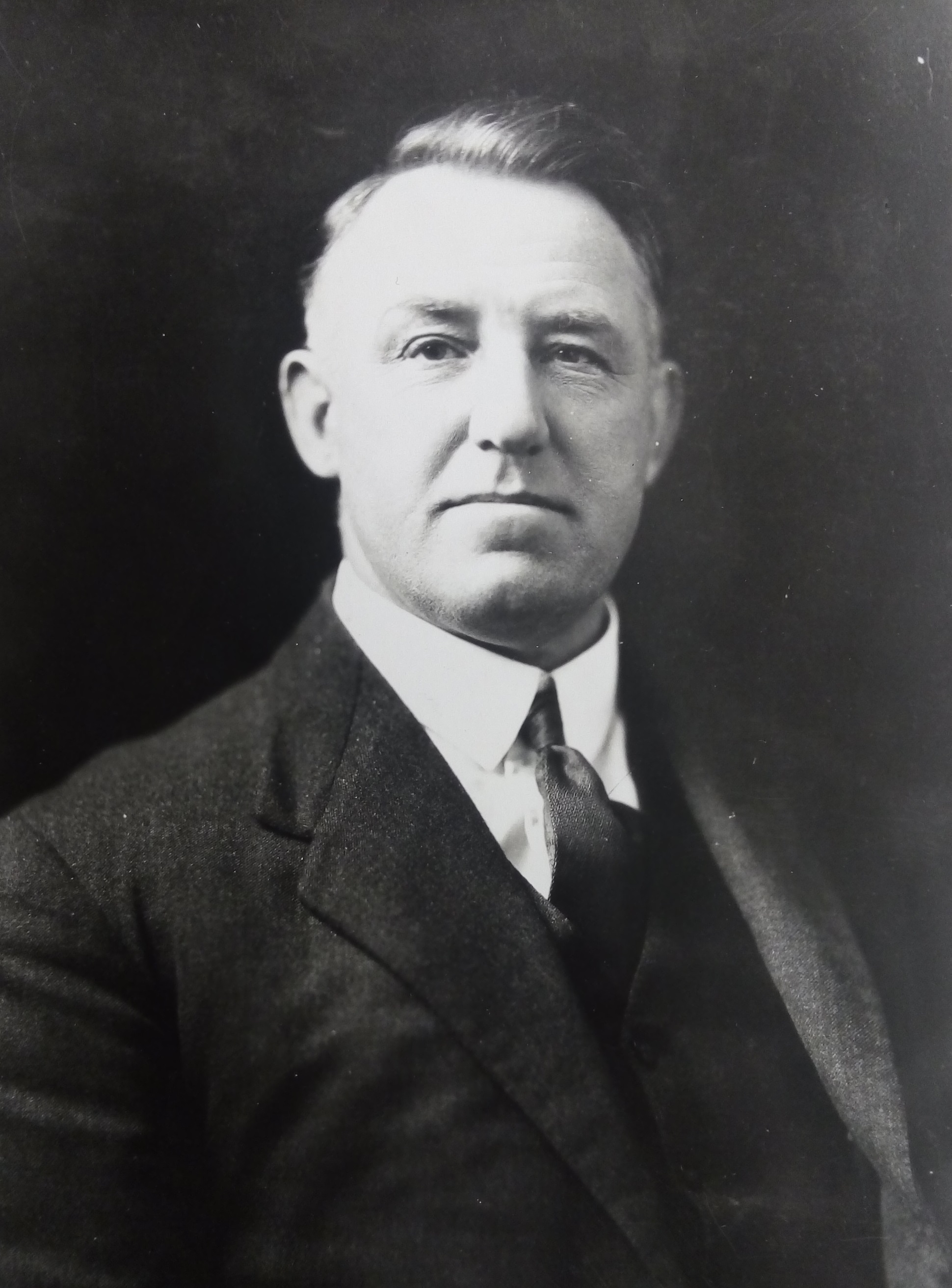
Robert Masters

== Order of the British Empire ==
=== Knight Commander (KBE) ===
Civil division

- Francis Gordon Bell MC MD FRCS – of Dunedin; formerly professor of surgery, University of Otago.

=== Commander (CBE) ===
Civil division

- Andrew Linton – of Greytown; a member of the Dairy Board for many years.
- John Thomas Martin – of Wellington. For public services, especially in the field of commerce.
- Oswald Chettle Mazengarb – of Wellington. For charitable and public services, especially in the field of law.
- Kenneth Mathison Sleight – of Lower Hutt; chief private secretary to the prime minister.
- Harvey Turner – of Auckland; chairman of the Auckland Harbour Board.

Military division

- Group Captain George Henry Procter – Royal Air Force.
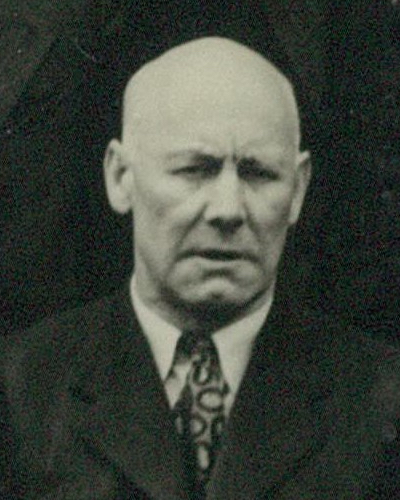
Andrew Linton

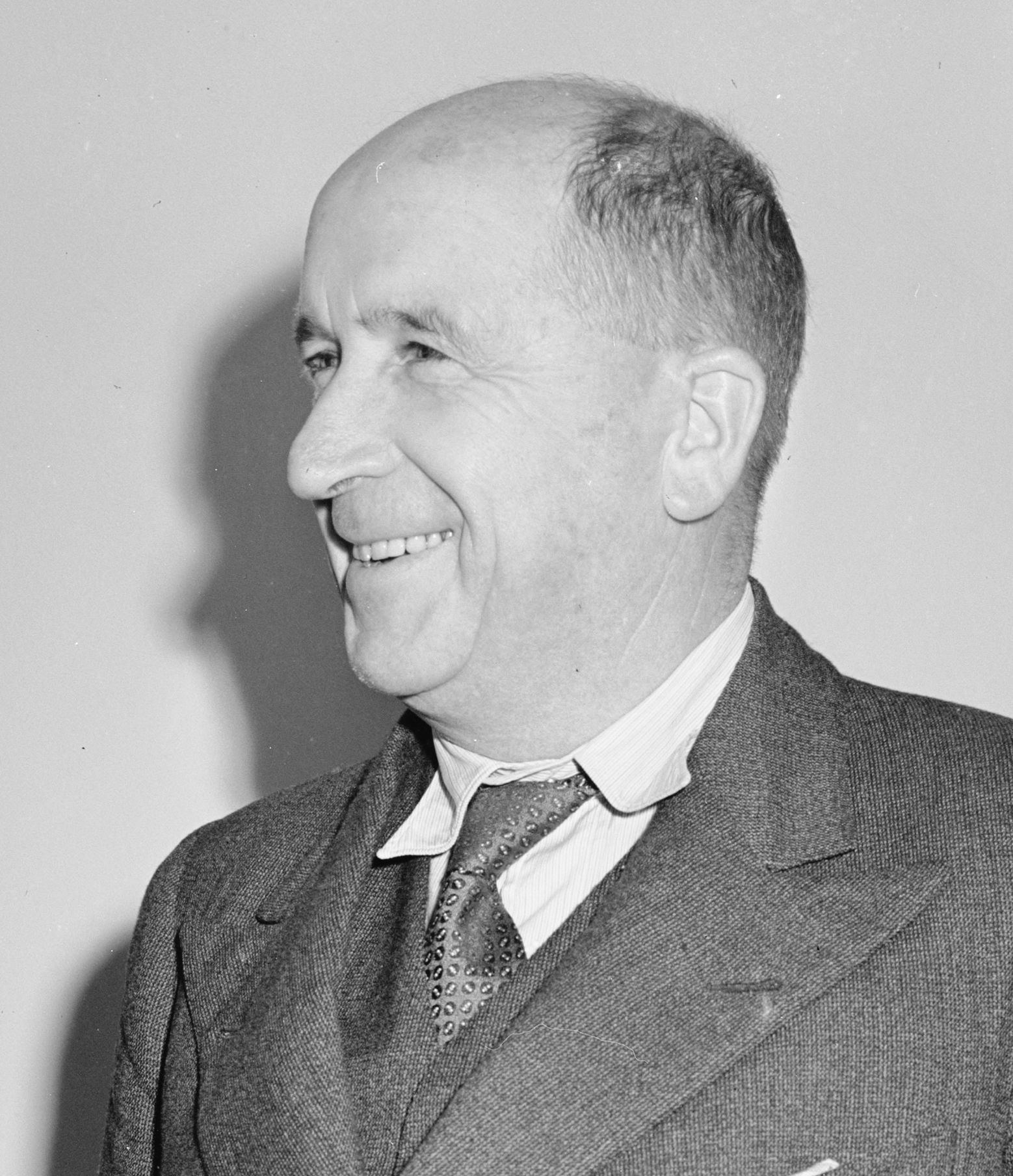
Ossie Mazengarb

=== Officer (OBE) ===
Civil division

- George Bruce Bolt – of Auckland. For services to aviation.
- Arthur James Dickson – of Auckland; city engineer, Auckland, and chairman of the Auckland Metropolitan Planning Committee.
- Alfred Hildus Hansen – of Te Rehunga. For services to local government.
- Joseph Auty Harley – of Nelson; mayor of Nelson.
- Noeline Mary Knight – of Wellington; matron-in-chief, Wellington Hospital.
- William Thomas Lester JP – of Lyttelton. For services to local government.
- Melville Edwin Lyons – of Christchurch. For services to local government and agriculture.
- Charles James Parlane – of Hamilton. For services to the dairy industry and farming.
- Frederick Martyn Renner JP – of Lower Hutt. For services to education.
- Helena, Lady Sidey – of Dunedin. For social welfare services, especially in connection with women's organisations.
- Charles James Strongman JP – of Greymouth. For services to the coal-mining industry.
- Frederick Ernest Sutton JP – of Lyttelton. For services to local government.
- Henry Te Reiwhati Vercoe DSO DCM – of Rotorua; chairman of the Arawa Trust Board.
- Francis William Ward – of Paraparaumu; chief commissioner, St John Ambulance Brigade.

Military division

- Commander Peter John Knowling – Royal Navy (on loan to the Royal New Zealand Navy); of Auckland.
- Lieutenant-Colonel Alexander William Huntly Borrie MC – New Zealand Territorial Force; of Dunedin.
- Lieutenant-Colonel Francis Reid – Royal New Zealand Army Ordnance Corps; of Lower Hutt.
- Squadron Leader Thomas Gerald Harpur – Royal New Zealand Air Force; of Wellington.
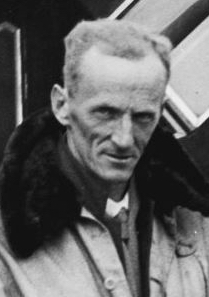
George Bolt

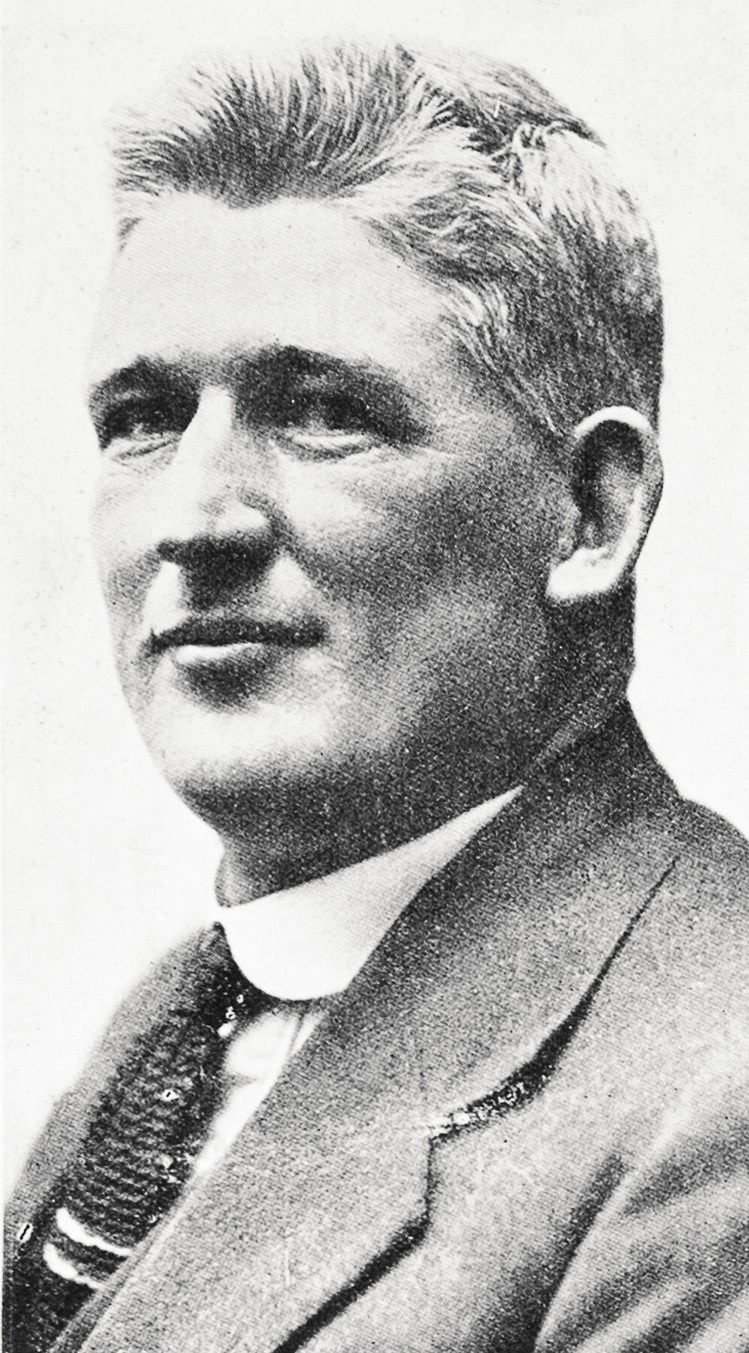
Melville Lyons

=== Member (MBE) ===
Civil division

- George Richard Ashbridge JP – of Wellington; secretary, New Zealand Educational Institute.
- Alfred Ernest Bedford JP – of Napier. For services to the community.
- Albert Raymond Blank – of Christchurch. For services to primary education.
- Frederick Ernest Bognuda – of Wellington. For services to the community in the field of public transport.
- Margaret Ann Selena Brown – of Invercargill. For social welfare services.
- Whina Cooper – of Auckland. For services to the Māori people.
- Alan Percival Day – Pukekohe. For services to Franklin County Council and to patriotic movements.
- Eric Charles Day – Hamilton. For services in promoting rehabilitation activities in the South Auckland area.
- Sidney Ensor JP – of Thames; mayor of Thames.
- Thelma Ruth Faulconbridge – of Takapuna; matron of the Wilson Home for Crippled Children, Auckland.
- Stewart William Gaspar – of Upper Hutt; a member of the Rehabilitation Board.
- John Septimus Hawkes – of Christchurch; secretary, Canterbury Automobile Association.
- Paul Joseph Hintz – of Auckland. For public services.
- Stanley Clarence Hyndman – of Blenheim. For services to the community, especially in connection with education.
- Amy Kasper JP – of Auckland. For social welfare services.
- Jessie Elizabeth Mackay JP – of Christchurch, a prominent social welfare worker and a member of the North Canterbury Hospital Board.
- The Reverend Alexander McNeur – a Presbyterian minister, of Waiau.
- William James O'Connell – of Napier; clerk of the Hawkes Bay County Council.
- Geoffrey Buckland Orbell MB ChB – of Invercargill. For scientific work.
- Emilie Mary Gladys Ormond – of Hawkes Bay. For social welfare services.
- Mark Edwin Perreau JP – of Foxton. For services to local government.
- Albert Eden Russell JP – of Dunedin. For services to the community.
- Henry Piet Drury van Asch – of Havelock North. For services to civil aviation, especially in connection with aerial survey.
- Florence Webb – of Cromwell. For social welfare services.
- Elizabeth Maria Wilkinson – of Browns Bay. For social welfare services, especially in connection with the Returned Soldiers' Association.

Military division

- Warrant Officer First Class Robert John Barr Allan – New Zealand Regiment; of Dunedin.
- Captain (Temporary Major) Geoffrey James Austin – New Zealand Territorial Force; of Auckland.
- Flight Lieutenant Alfred Charles Gordon Baldwin – Royal New Zealand Air Force; of Taieri.
- Major Clifford Allen Borman – New Zealand Territorial Force; of Upper Hutt.
- Major Denis Alfred Caughley – Royal New Zealand Armoured Corps; of Waiouru.
- Warrant Officer Victor Leonard Vivian Crawshay – Royal New Zealand Air Force; of Auckland.
- Flight Lieutenant Francis Maitland Bissett George – Royal New Zealand Air Force; of Auckland.
- Warrant Officer Claude Francis Halkett – Royal New Zealand Air Force; of Blenheim.
- Second-Lieutenant (Temporary Lieutenant) Joseph Robb Harrison – New Zealand Territorial Force; of Oamaru.
- Captain Stephen Peter Llewellyn – Headquarters New Zealand K-Force, Royal New Zealand Infantry; serving in Japan.
- Major William Arthur Morgan – Royal New Zealand Armoured Corps; now serving in Malaya.
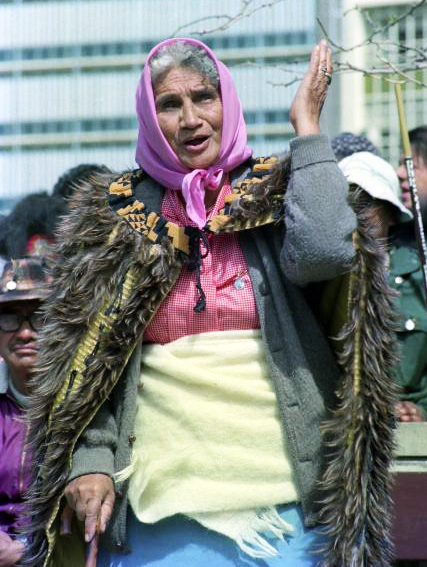
Whina Cooper

== Companion of the Imperial Service Order (ISO) ==
- Francis Raymond Callaghan – of Wellington; secretary, Department of Scientific and Industrial Research.
- David George Sawers – of Lower Hutt; comptroller of Customs.
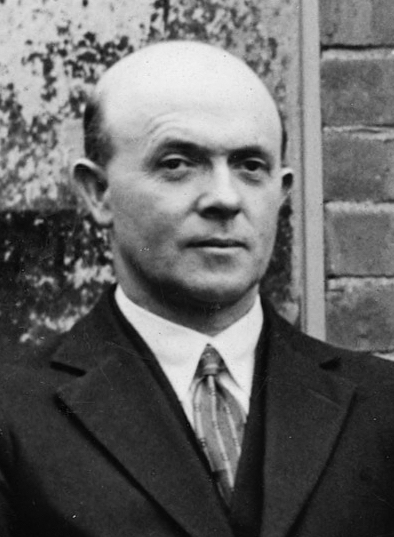
Frank Callaghan

== British Empire Medal (BEM) ==
Civil division

- Robert Waddell – of Auckland; chargeman of labourers, Naval Dockyard, Auckland.

Military division

- Chief Petty Officer Joe Dykes – Royal New Zealand Naval Volunteer Reserve; of Wellington.
- Flight Sergeant Gordon Robert Homer – Royal New Zealand Air Force; of Auckland.
- Flight Sergeant Alfred Spencer Price – Royal New Zealand Air Force; of Ohakea.
- Sergeant Charles Milford Jennings – Royal New Zealand Air Force; of Auckland.
- Sergeant Eric Slinn – Royal New Zealand Air Force; of Christchurch.

== Royal Red Cross ==
=== Member (RRC) ===
- Matron Christina McDonald ARRC – New Zealand Army Nursing Service, attached the Royal New Zealand Naval Hospital, Auckland.

== Air Force Cross (AFC) ==
- Flight Lieutenant Geoffrey Reid Burton Highet DFC – Royal New Zealand Air Force; of Ohakea.
- Flight Lieutenant Thomas Robin Rabone – Royal New Zealand Air Force; of Ohakea.

== Queen's Commendation for Valuable Service in the Air ==
- Sergeant David Scott Galloway – Royal New Zealand Air Force; of Laucala Bay, Fiji.

== Special awards for operational service in Korea ==
=== Bar to the Distinguished Service Cross ===
- Commander George Raymond Davis-Goff DSC – Royal New Zealand Navy, HMNZS Hawea.

=== Order of the British Empire ===
==== Member (MBE) ====
Military division

- Captain Andrew Channings – 16th Field Regiment, Royal New Zealand Artillery.

=== Military Cross (MC) ===
- Captain (Temporary Major) Vincent George Skilton – 16th Field Regiment, Royal New Zealand Artillery.

=== Mentioned in despatches ===
- Ordnance Artificer (2) John Findlay Gray – Royal New Zealand Navy, HMNZS Rotoiti.
- Captain Brian Poananga – headquarters, 1st Commonwealth Division, New Zealand Regiment.
- Corporal (Temporary Sergeant) John Mason Spiers – New Zealand Regiment 3rd Battalion, Royal Australian Regiment.
- Gunner James Francis Reid – 16th Field Regiment, Royal New Zealand Artillery.
- Gunner Colin Edward Ryan – 16th Field Regiment, Royal New Zealand Artillery.
