= St Simon's Church, Shepherd's Bush =

Coordinates: 51.502°N 0.218°W

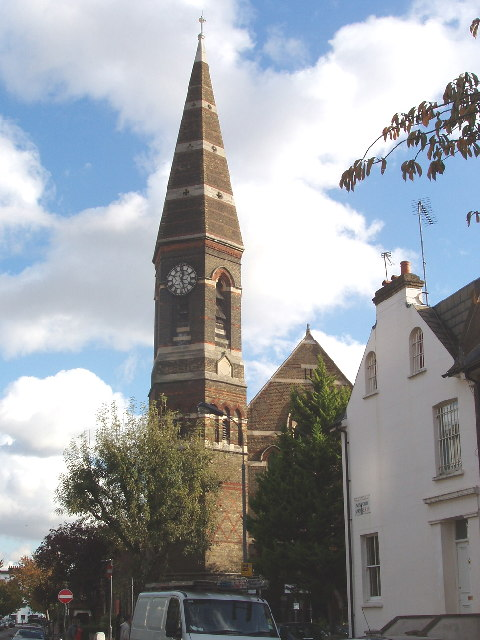
- Church of St Simon, Shepherd's Bush
- St Simon's Church, Shepherd's Bush
- Location: Shepherd's Bush, London
- Country: England
- Denomination: Church of England
- Website: https://www.stsimons.co.uk

History
- Dedication: St Simon

Architecture
- Architect: Sir Arthur Blomfield
- Style: Victorian Gothic
- Years built: 1879 - 1886

Administration
- Diocese: London

Clergy
- Vicar: The Reverend Cameron Collington

The Church of St Simon is a Church of England parish church in Shepherd's Bush, London. It holds informal worship services each Sunday at 10:30am, to which everyone is warmly welcome. The church was built circa 1879 - 1886, designed by architect Sir Arthur Blomfield in the Gothic Revival style with a tower. The church is located on the south side of Shepherd's Bush Green on Rockley Road.

== History ==
=== 19th century ===
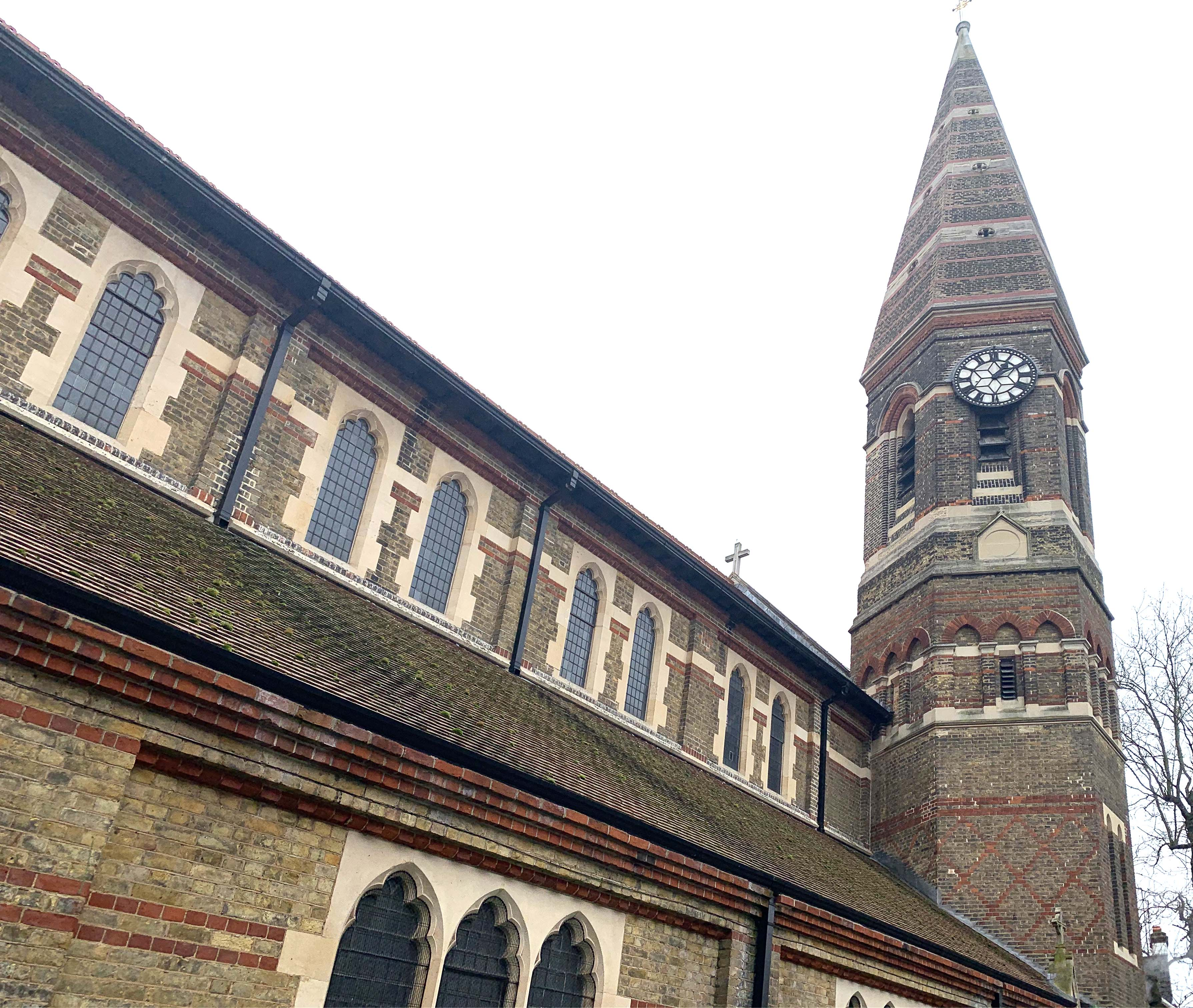
St Simons Church Shepherd's Bush

St Simon's church is a late Victorian church building built from 1879 - 1886, and designed by the noted architect Sir Arthur Blomfield. The foundation stone was laid on 6 March 1878 by the philanthropist and evangelical Anglican John Derby Allcroft, MP for Worcester. The first service was conducted in 1880.

The chancel, parish hall and spire were completed in 1886. The tower and spire are polychrome with horizontal bands of stonework.

The pipe organ dates from 1865, and was purchased from Dunblane Cathedral in 1893. The pipe organ states that it was "rebuilt by Eustace Ingram, London 1893".

=== 20th century ===
In 1903 stained glass was installed in the East window to commemorate the first vicar, the Reverend Robert Handcock.

== St Simon's in the present day ==
A Church for Everyone

We believe that God is building a worshipping and caring community, growing from St Simon's, which reaches out to all people, with a desire to see faith in Jesus Christ transform the area of Shepherds Bush.

An informal worship service is held each Sunday at 10:30 a.m. Children's groups are available on most Sundays for children aged two and older, with a soft-play area provided for babies and toddlers. A separate group for teenagers meets on alternate Sundays; on other Sundays, teenagers attend the main service.

The St Simon's building is surrounded by late Victorian and early Edwardian terraced housing, and is located a few hundred yards south of Shepherd's Bush Green. It is close to Shepherds Bush Tube station. It retains its original imposing spire and clock tower. The vicar is The Reverend Cameron Collington.

== See also ==
- History of Shepherd's Bush
- List of Commissioners' churches in London
- St Stephen's Church, Shepherd's Bush

== Gallery ==
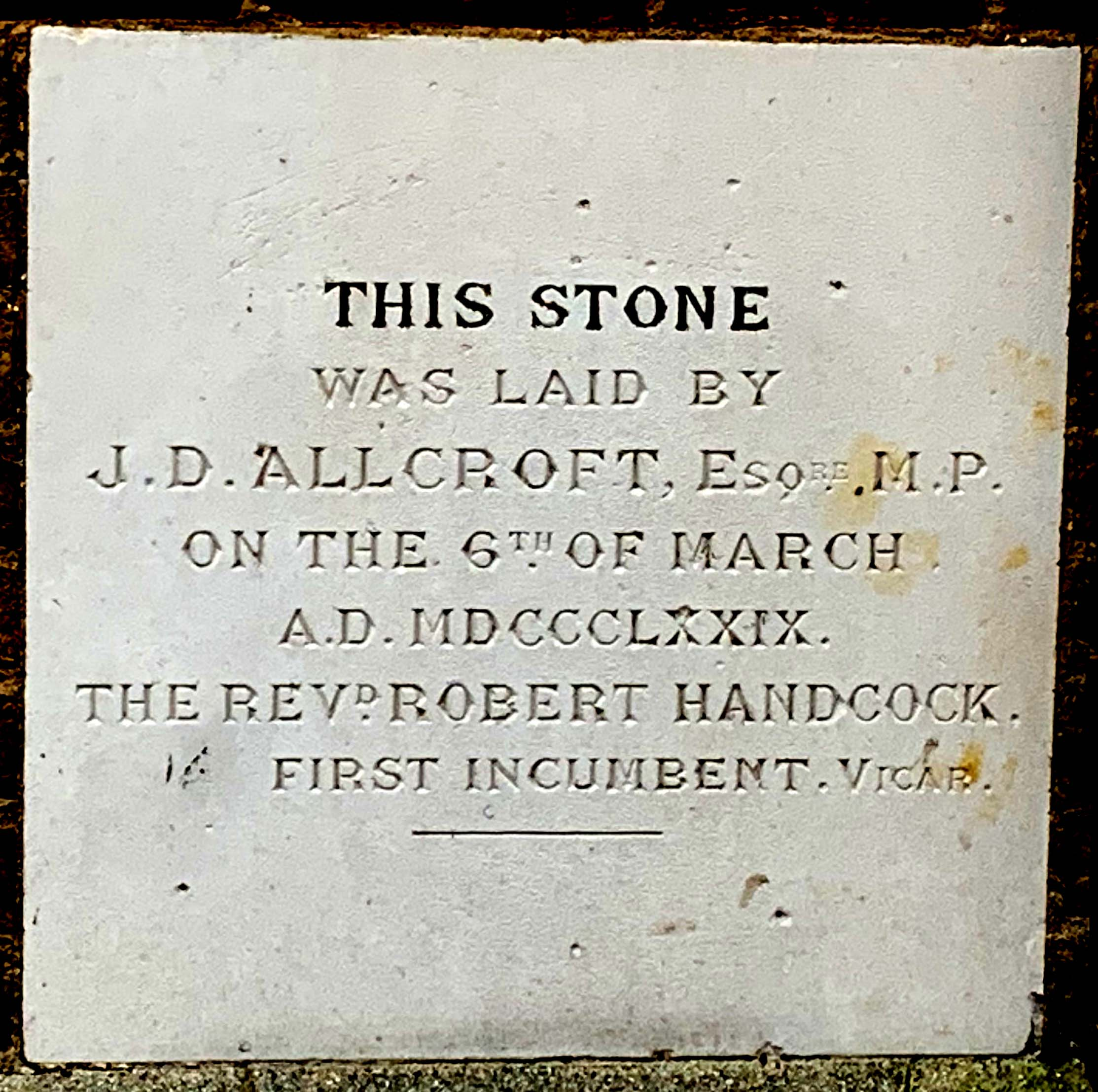
St Simon's Church, Shepherd's Bush, Foundation Stone
