= Stanley Foster =

New Zealand surgeon and cricketer

Stanley Foster CMG
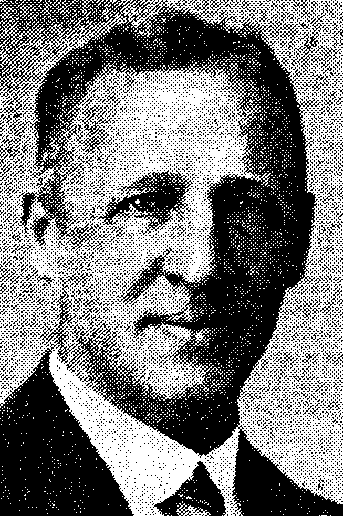

Personal information
- Full name: Philip Stanley Foster
- Born: 4 April 1885; Timaru, New Zealand
- Died: 20 March 1965 (aged 79); Christchurch, New Zealand
- Height: 5 ft 8.5 in (1.74 m)
- Batting: Right-handed
- Bowling: Right-arm off-spin

Domestic team information
- Years: Team
- 1909/10: Wellington
- 1918/19–1919/20: Canterbury

Career statistics
Competition	First-class
Matches	3
Runs scored	51
Batting average	12.75
100s/50s	0/0
Top score	31
Catches/stumpings	0/–
- Source: CricketArchive, 18 April 2019

Philip Stanley Foster CMG (4 April 1885 – 20 March 1965) was a New Zealand surgeon and cricketer.

== Life and career ==
Born in Timaru, Stanley Foster was educated at Otago Boys' High School from 1899 to 1903, then studied medicine at the University of New Zealand. He served as house surgeon at Wellington Hospital for 15 months before being appointed senior house surgeon at Christchurch Hospital in June 1910. He undertook post-graduate studies in London from 1911 to 1913. He married Florence Chisholm in Wellington in December 1914.

In the First World War he served with the rank of captain as an army surgeon on the hospital ship SS Maheno. He returned to New Zealand in October 1917.

Before the war Foster had played one first-class cricket match for Wellington while working in the hospital there. In January 1919 he opened the batting for Canterbury and made 31 and 13 when Canterbury beat Wellington to regain the Plunket Shield in Wellington. In December 1919 he was selected to play for Canterbury against Wellington in Christchurch. During the first day's play, while Wellington were batting and Foster was fielding, he was called away to perform an urgent surgical operation in Waikari, a small town north of Christchurch. As Foster had neither batted nor bowled, the Wellington captain allowed a full substitute, and Harry Whitta took his place in the Canterbury team. It was Foster's last first-class match, though he continued to play club cricket in Christchurch. He later represented Hawke's Bay at the New Zealand Cricket Council's annual meetings in Christchurch for many years.

A pioneer of neurosurgery in New Zealand, Foster was the director of surgical services at Christchurch Hospital from 1934 to 1946. He served as President of the New Zealand branch of the BMA in 1939–40, and as Chairman of the New Zealand Medical Council from 1948 to 1957. He was appointed a Companion of the Order of St Michael and St George in the 1953 Coronation Honours.

Foster was a prominent Rotarian in Christchurch for many years. He was appointed district governor of New Zealand Rotary in 1935.
