= Harvey Turner =

New Zealand auctioneer (1889–1983)

Sir Harvey Turner CBE (11 September 1889 – 31 December 1983) was a New Zealand auctioneer, horticultural wholesaler and distributor, and businessman. He was born in Auckland, New Zealand, in 1889.

In the 1953 Coronation Honours, Turner was appointed a Commander of the Order of the British Empire. He was appointed a Knight Bachelor, for services to the fruit and produce industry, in the 1967 New Year Honours. He died in Auckland in 1983, and was buried at Purewa Cemetery.

In 2005, Turner was posthumously inducted into the New Zealand Business Hall of Fame.
