= St Stephen's School (Shepherd's Bush) =

Coordinates: 51.505494°N 0.228652°W

Location
- Uxbridge Road and Coverdale Rd; London, W12 8LH; England

Information
- Type: Primary school, Voluntary Aided School
- Motto: "Through God We Achieve"
- Religious affiliation: Church of England
- Established: c. 1849–1850
- Local authority: Hammersmith & Fulham
- Department for Education URN: 100353 Tables
- Ofsted: Reports
- Head teacher: Michael Schumm
- Gender: Girls and Boys
- Age: 3 to 11
- Enrollment: 384
- Website: http://www.ststephensce.lbhf.sch.uk/

St Stephen's School is a Church of England primary school for girls and boys located on the Uxbridge Road in Shepherd's Bush, in the London Borough of Hammersmith and Fulham, England. It is affiliated with St Stephen's Church, Shepherd's Bush, in the Diocese of London, and was built at the same time, circa 1849–50. As of 2011 St Stephen's was rated "outstanding" by Ofsted. In 2017 it was ranked equal fifth in the Sunday Times list of the top 500 State Primary Schools in the UK and also featured in The Tatler's list of Best State Primary Schools.

== History ==
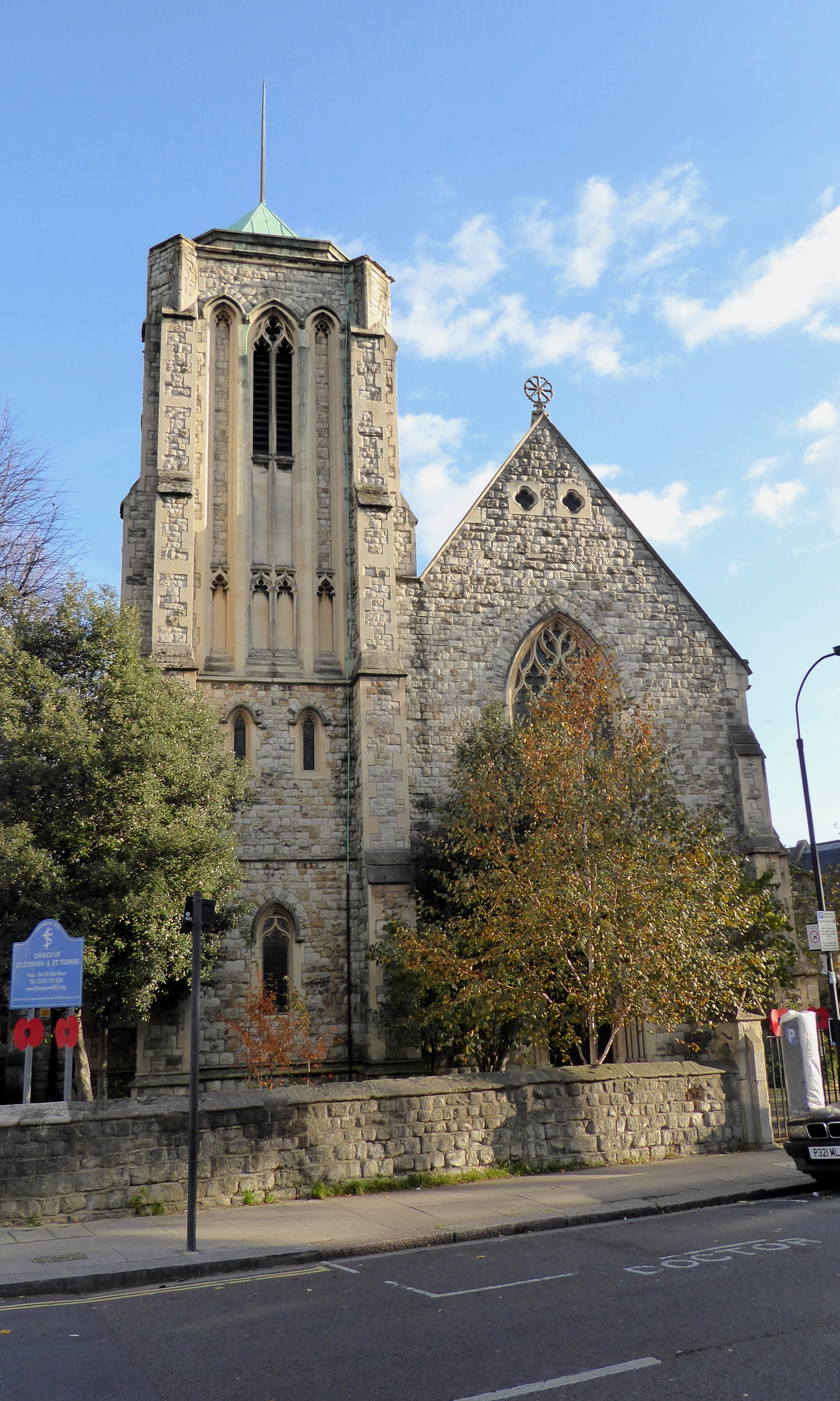
St Stephen's Church, built c1849-50

St Stephen's School has been at the heart of its local community for over 150 years, part of the original village of Shepherd's Bush, and built at the same time as St Stephen's Church, circa 1849–50.

== Introduction ==
St Stephen's is a Voluntary Aided School, with 384 pupils in 2018, and an age range of 3 to 11 years, both girls and boys. It is located on the Uxbridge Road in Shepherd's Bush, in the London Borough of Hammersmith and Fulham, England, at the junction with Coverdale Road, next to St Stephen's Church. Reflecting the diversity of the local area, 32% of pupils at the school do not have English as a first language, against a national average of 20.5%. The ratio of students to teachers is 24.5:1, against a national average of 20.6:1. 8.2% of students are given free school meals, against a national average of 24.9%. The school embraces parent participation and even organises an annual Grandparents Day.

== Admissions ==
St Stephen's has a two-form entry system, admitting 30 children in each class. Admission to the school is the responsibility of the school governors. 40 "Foundation Places" are offered every year to "practising members of a Christian church" and also "practising members of the congregation" at the Church of St Stephen and St Thomas, Shepherds Bush who live in the parish. In addition, there are also 20 "Open Places" available each year, which "are determined by distance". Priority is given to "children with a sibling" already in the school.

=== Special Needs ===
St Stephen's supports the admission of students with special needs. Applicants with a signed Statement of Special Educational Needs or an Education, Health & Care plan that specifically names St Stephen's will be admitted in accordance with Section 43 of the Children and Families Act 2014.

== Ranking and Reputation ==
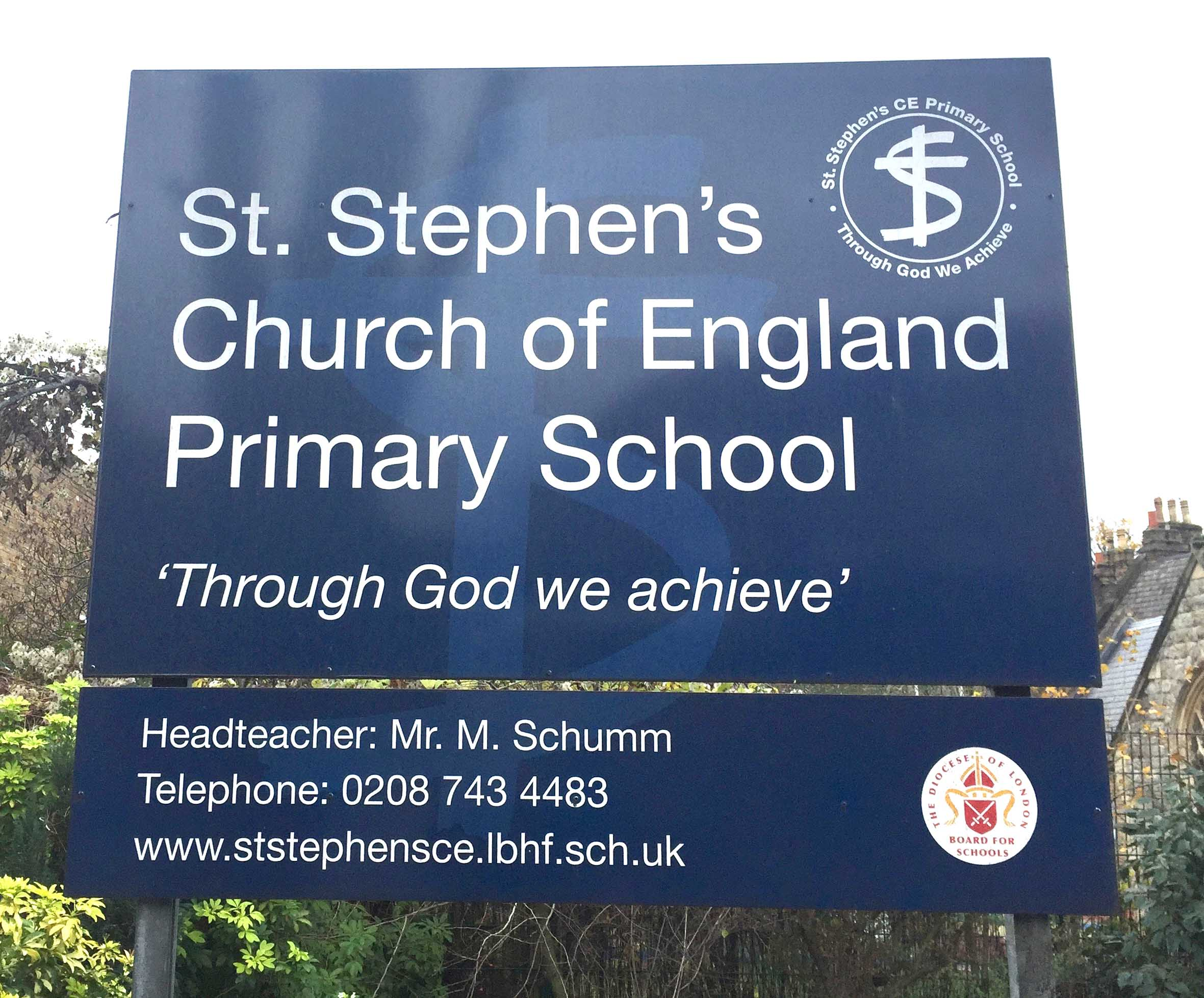
St Stephens School Shepherd's Bush

In 2008 Ofsted reported that it was "a good school with a number of outstanding features". In June 2011 St Stephen's was rated "outstanding" by Ofsted, which reported that "the inspirational leadership of the headteacher, deputy headteacher and middle leaders can be seen at every level". St Stephen's was ranked 30th in the Sunday Times list of the top 500 State Primary Schools in the UK in 2018, and equal 5th in 2017. St Stephen's also featured in The Tatler's list of Best State Primary Schools in 2017. Tatler were "wowed by the smiling faces in every classroom", described the school as "the best of the best", and suggested that "someone give Michael Schumm a knighthood - he's one of the most inspiring heads we've met". In December 2018 official Government primary school league tables showed St Stephen's ranked equal third among schools in Hammersmith and Fulham. In December 2021 St Stephen's was ranked 38th in the Sunday Times League Table of Best Primary Schools in the UK.

== Fundraising ==
The Friends of St Stephen's (FOSS) has a successful history of fundraising to support school activities, such as provision of extra help for students with special needs.
