= George Richard Ashbridge =

New Zealand accountant, teachers' union official, educationalist

George Richard Ashbridge (13 August 1901–25 October 1984) was a New Zealand accountant, teachers’ union official and educationalist. He was born in Wellington, New Zealand on 13 August 1901.

He was conferred as a Member of the Order of the British Empire during the 1953 Coronation Honours in New Zealand.
