= David Ashbridge Log House =

Historic house in Pennsylvania, United States

- U.S. National Register of Historic Places
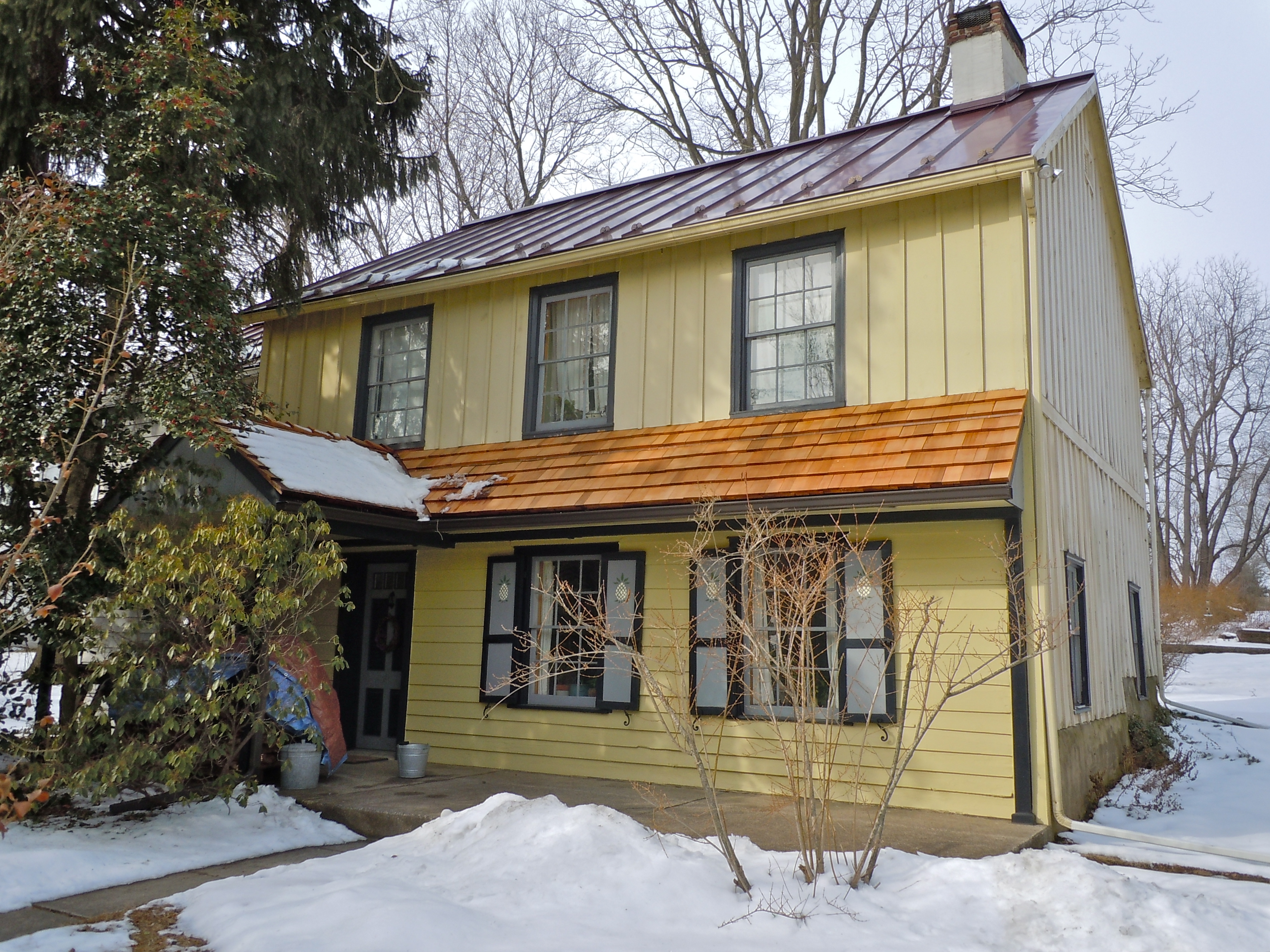
- Ashbridge Log House, January 2011

- Location within Pennsylvania Location within the United States
- Interactive map showing the location of Ashbridge Log House
- Location: 1181 King Rd., West Whiteland Township, Pennsylvania
- Coordinates: 40°1′6″N 75°35′21″W
- Area: 1.2 acres (0.49 ha)
- Built: 1782, 1970
- Built by: David Ashbridge
- MPS: West Whiteland Township MRA
- NRHP reference No.: 84003878
- Added to NRHP: November 6, 1984

The David Ashbridge Log House is a historic home located at 1181 King Road in West Whiteland Township, Chester County, Pennsylvania. One of the historic properties included within the Battle of the Clouds Historic District, it was erected in 1782 by Quaker farmer David Ashbridge. It was added to the National Register of Historic Places in 1984.

== History and architectural features ==
According to Diane Snyder, the co-owner of this historic residence in 1981 as well as the individual who prepared the Pennsylvania Historic Resource Survey Form about the residence that same year on behalf of the West Whiteland Historic Commission, the David Ashbridge Log House "was built by an English farmer using a German building tradition," and "is one of 3 known habitable log dwellings which still survive in a township where log houses were very common."

The West Whiteland Township Historic Commission has documented that the home's builder and first owner was David Ashbridge, an English Quaker farmer who was one of the township's early settlers.

The original section of this historic residence was built on 96 acres in 1782 and is a two-story, three-bay, banked log structure with a full attic. The logs are covered with wood siding. It measures 20 feet by 25 feet and has a gable roof. A frame addition was built in 1970.
