= John Asbridge =

British vicar

Reverend John Asbridge
- Vicar of St Stephen's Church, Shepherd's Bush
- In office: 1960s until 1988

The Reverend John Asbridge was Vicar of St Stephen's Church, Shepherd's Bush, London during the 1960s, and was the driving force behind the creation of the Shepherds Bush Housing Association, an organisation which was set up to help solve problems of homelessness and poor housing in West London.

== Shepherd's Bush Housing Association ==
The choir vestry at St Stephen’s was used as an office, which was run by volunteers from the parish. In addition, help was given by a number of parishioners who gifted their own houses to the association for use by homeless people. Their first acquisition was a dilapidated house at 220 Hammersmith Grove, which was converted into flats. Asbridge ran the Association for 20 years, retiring in 1988. Today, the Shepherd's Bush Housing Association owns and manages more than 5,000 homes.
