= Pāora Temuera =

New Zealand Anglican priest

Pāora Temuera MBE (1886–1957) was a notable New Zealand Anglican priest. Of Māori descent, he identified with the Ngāti Whakaue and Te Arawa iwi. He was born at Ohinemutu, Rotorua, New Zealand, in about 1886.

In the 1950 King's Birthday Honours, Temuera was appointed a Member of the Order of the British Empire for services to the Māori people.
