= 1976 Nelson by-election =

New Zealand by-election

- 28 February 1976
- Turnout: 17,470 (79.03%)
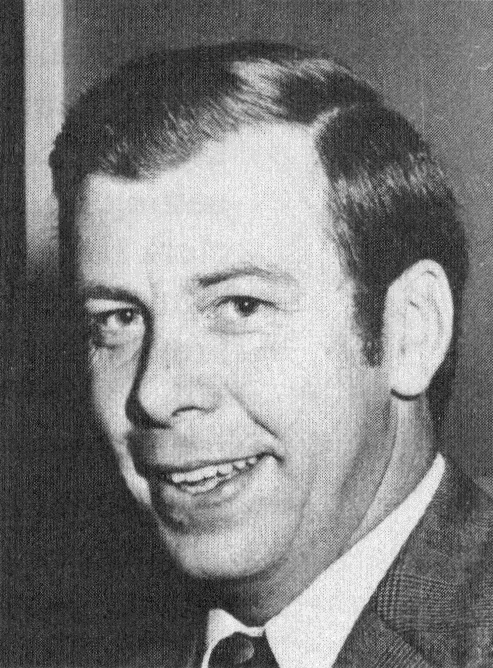

Candidate	Mel Courtney	Peter Malone
Party	Labour	National
Popular vote	8,418	6,913
Percentage	48.18	39.57
Member before election
Sir Stanley Whitehead
Labour
Elected Member
Mel Courtney
Labour

The 1976 Nelson by-election was a by-election held on 28 February 1976 in the New Zealand electorate of Nelson, a predominantly urban seat at the top of the South Island. The by-election was triggered by the death of the sitting Labour Party MP Sir Stanley Whitehead.

== Background ==
The by-election was precipitated by the death of sitting Labour Party member of parliament and Speaker of the House Sir Stanley Whitehead on 9 January 1976. Whitehead had been re-elected two months earlier at the 1975 general election which saw the defeat of the Third Labour Government, of which he was a member.

As a new session of Parliament had not begun Whitehead was still legally the Speaker of the House. As such, the Governor-General, Denis Blundell, gazetted the vacancy of the seat as the acting speaker and gave the instructed the Clerk of the Writs to issue a writ for the by-election.

== Candidates ==
=== Labour ===
After Labour's shock defeat at the 1975 election Labour leader Bill Rowling was facing open concerns about the effectiveness of his leadership. His first test as Leader of the Opposition came with the Nelson by-election which became seen as crucial to his future. Media commentators were openly suggesting he could not survive should Labour suffer two losses in a row. There was a concerted effort to seek candidates with links to Nelson as there were fears in the area that MPs who had lost their seats in 1975 would become "parachute candidates". Defeated Waitemata MP Michael Bassett was asked about the Nelson candidacy but he ruled it out saying he was not interested in Nelson and "nor would Nelson be interested in me."

The candidates for the nomination were:

- Geoff Amos, a tobacco company representative
- Mel Courtney, a grocer and Nelson City Councillor
- Sonja Davies, union secretary and former member of the Nelson City Council and Hospital Board
- Malcolm McNamara, assistant head of the South-East Asian section of the Ministry of Foreign Affairs and former private secretary to Norman Kirk
- Frank O'Flynn, former MP for Kapiti
- Geoffrey Palmer, law faculty professor at Victoria University

Mel Courtney, a 32-year-old supermarket proprietor, was chosen as the candidate. He had lived in Nelson for six years and was a member of the Nelson City Council. He was originally from Christchurch and had been the vice-chairman of the Sydenham Labour Representation Committee and was a Labour candidate for the Christchurch City Council in 1968. His selection was a surprise given the presence of more well-known contenders (Davies was runner up). Rowling's preferred choice was Palmer. As Palmer had neither liven in the area for decades and had been a party member for less than two-years there was resistance to Palmer's nomination. A group of local party members threatened legal action over his membership tenure if he was nominated. To prevent a split in the membership Arthur Baysting, the secretary of the Nelson Labour Electorate Committee (LEC), pushed for Courtney to be selected believing him to be the most electable alternative to Palmer.

=== National ===
The National Party were confident of their chances to flip the seat following their convincing win in 1975. Top officials in the party were not only predicting a win, but that they may get as much as a 2,000 vote majority. At the same time Labour were conducting their selection meeting, National conducted a pre-selection meeting lasting six hours to reduce the number of applicants to a shortlist of five.

The candidates for the nomination were:

- Ted Krammer, a company secretary
- Peter Malone, a veterinary surgeon who was National's candidate in Nelson in 1963 and Tasman in 1975
- Roy McLennan, the Mayor of Nelson who had contested Nelson in 1969
- Ian McWhannell, National's candidate for Nelson in 1972 and 1975
- Colin Victor Neale, a company director and former chairman of the Nelson National Party − son of Edgar Neale

Malone was elected on the first ballot at a meeting of 150 members (70 of whom were voting delegates). His selection was contrary to expectation as McLennan was seen as the front-runner.

=== Social Credit ===
Two people came forward to represent the Social Credit Party, Cliff Beer and Rudolf Muller. Muller was selected. He had contested the Tasman electorate in 1975.

== Campaign ==
Courtney waged a local issues campaign and proved "an excellent choice" as a candidate. Courtney, a Nelson City Councillor, stressed Nelson's needs as a community as the major theme of his campaign which was managed by MPs Colin Moyle and Arthur Faulkner. Moyle, Faulkner and Labour leader Bill Rowling spoke at meetings in support of Courtney and defended him from attacks by National that he was the wrong choice of a candidate and that Palmer was more suitable highlighting that Courtney had lived and worked in Nelson for the last 6 years while Palmer had not. He had "lived in Nelson for a number of years", was a Nelson City Councillor and struck a chord with electors: "Nelson is a unique place to live and consequently a local person (Mr Courtney) can best serve local interests". Malone's campaign manager was Stuart Bowater who planned a strategy of mobilising the 2,000 National Party members in the electorate and then expanding support across the electorate. Several National MPs including cabinet ministers campaigned for Malone as well. Social Credit Party leader Bruce Beetham campaigned in the by-election and drew on previous MP for Nelson Harry Atmore's record as an advocate for monetary reform and providing an independent voice for the area as evidence that Nelson residents could benefit from voting Social Credit instead of the main two parties.

== Results ==
The following table gives the election results:

1976 Nelson by-election
Party	Candidate	Votes	%	±%
Labour	Mel Courtney	8,418	48.18	
National	Peter Malone	6,913	39.57	
Values	Gwen Struik	1,583	9.06	+2.43
Social Credit	Rudolf Muller	452	2.58	
Imperial British Conservative	Coronita Weallens	38	0.21	
Informal votes		66	0.37	
Majority		1,505	8.61	
Turnout		17,470	79.03	–6.91
Registered electors		22,105		
Labour hold		Swing		

== Outcome ==
Labour fought a strong campaign and not only retained the seat but increased their majority as well, the victory at the polls vindicated the decision of the Labour Party's selection committee.

Courtney won with a majority of 1505 (he increased the majority Whitehead had achieved in the 1975 general election by an impressive 50 per cent-only three months after the National Party's landslide victory). Wellington's The Dominion newspaper reported that: "The defeat was a shock to the super-confident National Party organisers, including some of the party's top officials who were predicting a 2000-vote National majority". The success in Nelson periodically quietened the speculation about Rowling's leadership.
