= Stan Whitehead =

New Zealand politician

The Honourable Sir Stanley Whitehead
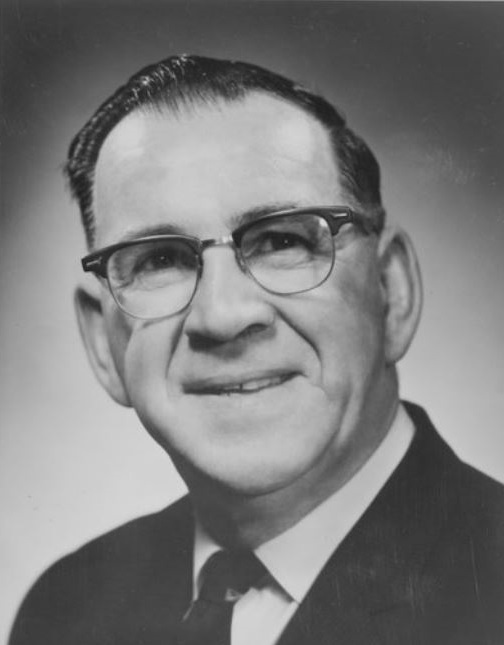

18th Speaker of the House of Representatives
- In office 14 February 1973 – 9 January 1976
- Prime Minister: Norman Kirk; Bill Rowling; Robert Muldoon
- Deputy: Ron Bailey; Jonathan Hunt
- Preceded by: Alf Allen
- Succeeded by: Roy Jack

8th Deputy Mayor of Nelson
- In office 13 October 1962 – 9 October 1965
- Mayor: Douglas Strawbridge
- Preceded by: Betsy Eyre
- Succeeded by: Betsy Eyre

Member of the New Zealand Parliament for Nelson
- In office 30 November 1957 – 9 January 1976
- Preceded by: Edgar Neale
- Succeeded by: Mel Courtney

Personal details
- Born: 8 October 1907 Reefton, New Zealand
- Died: 9 January 1976 (aged 68) Nelson, New Zealand
- Party: Labour
- Spouse: Frances Edna Clark
- Children: 7

Sir Stanley Austin Whitehead (8 October 1907 – 9 January 1976) was a New Zealand politician of the Labour Party. He was the eighteenth Speaker of the House of Representatives from 1973 to 1976, and Member of Parliament for the Nelson electorate from 1957 to 1976.

== Biography ==
=== Early life and family ===
Whitehead was born in Reefton, on the West Coast of New Zealand. He was brought up in the mining town of Waiuta, and left school at the age of 14 to enter work as a saw miller. He was an active sportsman in his youth competed in axemen's events. Whitehead played rugby league for Inangahua and Blackball on the West Coast as a five-eighth. He later was a referee and controlled provincial matches.

In 1928, he married Frances Edna Clark, at Greymouth. They had seven children together. The family moved to Inangahua Junction and he became secretary of the Inangahua school committee. He moved to Nelson and worked for Transport Nelson. He was on the Auckland Point school committee and was also the president of the parent teacher association. He was also on the council of the Nelson Polytechnic. He was an active trade unionist and was a member of the Nelson Trades Council for over 20 years.

=== Local political involvement ===
In 1953 he was elected Nelson City Council and served four terms, including being Deputy Mayor in his final term (1962–65).

In 1957 he was appointed to fill a vacancy on the Nelson Harbour Board and became heavily involved with the development of Port Nelson. In 1971 he was elected the board's deputy chairman and was still a member of the board at the time of his death.

He was on multiple school boards including over 20 years on the Board of Governors of Nelson College. He was the patron of several sporting clubs, including rugby, boxing, soccer, marching, bowls, and rugby league. He gave up most sporting participation with age but took up playing bowls which became his favourite form of relaxation.

=== Member of Parliament ===
New Zealand Parliament
Years	Term	Electorate	Party
1957–1960	32nd	Nelson	Labour
1960–1963	33rd	Nelson	Labour
1963–1966	34th	Nelson	Labour
1966–1969	35th	Nelson	Labour
1969–1972	36th	Nelson	Labour
1972–1975	37th	Nelson	Labour
1975–1976	38th	Nelson	Labour

Whitehead was first elected to Parliament in the 1957 election in the Nelson electorate. He held the electorate until his death in 1976. He had contested the seat twice unsuccessfully before in 1951 and 1954. After he became Labour leader in 1965, Norman Kirk designated Whitehead as Shadow Minister of Internal Affairs, Local Government and Civil Defence.

Whitehead featured along with Sonja Davies in protests over the closure of the Nelson railway line, which Davies wrote about in her book Bread and Roses, and also in the television series of same name. Davies was secretary of Whitehead's first successful election campaign in 1957.

In 1972, Whitehead was asked by Prime Minister Norman Kirk to become the Speaker of the House of Representatives during the Third Labour Government. Whitehead hosted Queen Elizabeth II and Prince Philip at the 1974 Commonwealth Games and had the duty of presiding after the death of Kirk later that year. Whitehead stated that his time as speaker was the highlight of his career.

He suffered a heart attack in the last parliamentary session of 1975. After a period in hospital he recovered enough to campaign for re-election in Nelson. A day after his re-election he suffered a further attack and was hospitalised for 10 days.

In the 1976 New Year Honours, Whitehead was appointed a Knight Bachelor, in recognition of his long public service to central and local government. After the surprise defeat of the Labour government he planned to retire at the 1978 election.

=== Death ===
Less than a week after being awarded his knighthood, at the age of 68 years, he died of a heart attack while welcoming a British ship, HMS Berwick. He was attending the official welcome luncheon at Port Nelson and having a drink with Captain Chatterton Dickson when he said he was "going to have a turn" then he collapsed on the deck. One of the ship's lieutenants and first aid men gave mouth-to-mouth resuscitation and a heart massage while the Mayor Roy McLennan rang an ambulance. He was rushed to Nelson Hospital but was pronounced dead on arrival.

He was awarded a civic funeral by the Nelson City Council in honour of his service to the city. The outpouring of grief from the local people was unprecedented as Nelson stopped for his service which was relayed by loud speakers to the thousands lining the streets outside Nelson Cathedral. Large crowds lined the streets to show their respect when the funeral procession passed. He was survived by his wife and seven children.

As a new session of Parliament had not begun Whitehead was still legally the Speaker of the House. As such, the Governor-General, Denis Blundell, gazetted the vacancy of the seat as the acting speaker and gave the instructed the Clerk of the Writs to issue a writ for the by-election. The by-election for Whitehead's seat was won by Mel Courtney, retaining the seat for Labour. Following his death, he was succeeded as Speaker by Roy Jack.

== Notes ==
Political offices
Preceded by Alf Allen	Speaker of the New Zealand House of Representatives; 1973–1976	Succeeded by Roy Jack
Preceded by Betsy Eyre	Deputy Mayor of Nelson; 1962–1965	Succeeded by Betsy Eyre
New Zealand Parliament
Preceded by Edgar Neale	Member of Parliament for Nelson; 1957–1976	Succeeded by Mel Courtney
