= Mel Courtney =

New Zealand politician

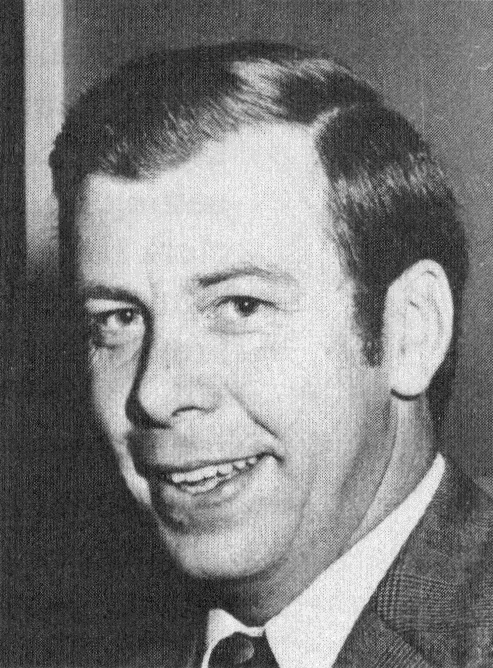
- Courtney in 1966

Member of the New Zealand Parliament for Nelson
- In office 28 February 1976 – 28 November 1981
- Preceded by: Stan Whitehead
- Succeeded by: Philip Woollaston

Personal details
- Born: 2 October 1943 (age 83) Christchurch, New Zealand
- Party: Labour (formerly)
- Spouse: Wendy Kerr (died 2015)
- Children: 3
- Occupation: Supermarket proprietor

Melvyn Francis Courtney (born 2 October 1943) is a New Zealand politician. He is a Nelson City Councillor and a former Labour then Independent Member of Parliament for Nelson, in the South Island of New Zealand.

== Early life and family ==
Courtney was born in Christchurch on 2 October 1943, the son of Clifford Francis and Joyce Elizabeth Courtney. He grew up in the suburb of Spreydon, and was educated at Christchurch Technical College.

His family wished to get a state house, but faced constant rejection from state housing officials. They went to local MP Mabel Howard who helped them to be accepted. His father had problems with alcohol and eventually left the family. As a 14-year old he got an after-school job at a grocery store leaving school at 16 to work at the store full time before shifting to work at a supermarket.

He studied business administration and trained in the grocery industry in Christchurch. In 1968, Courtney married his wife, Wendy, and the couple went on to have three children. His family moved from Christchurch to Nelson in 1970. He owned and operated Courtney Enterprises which, in the mid-1970s, owned two supermarkets and had fifty employees in Nelson.

== Political career ==
New Zealand Parliament
Years	Term	Electorate	Party
1976–1978	38th	Nelson	Labour
1978–1981	39th	Nelson	Labour
1981	Changed allegiance to:		Independent

Courtney was the vice-chairman of the Sydenham Labour Representation Committee and organised campaigns in the electorate for Mabel Howard and later Norman Kirk in the 1960s. He noticed firsthand Howard's cognitive decline stating: "She was past her best. She didn't know who I was. She kept thinking I was a newspaper reporter." As the 1966 election campaign began Howard was clearly ill and Courtney, as a member of her campaign committee, ensured she was assisted at public appearances. Howard had helped his family in their hour of need and he wanted to help her. He was a Labour candidate for the Christchurch City Council in 1968, but was not elected. Mabel Howard and Trevor Davey also stood and were unsuccessful.

Courtney was an elected member of Nelson City Council for six years during the 1970s under mayor Roy McLennan; for some of that time, he was also a member of parliament. He had a three-year gap and then became a member of the city council for another three-year term under mayor Peter Malone.

=== Member of Parliament ===
When Nelson's MP Sir Stan Whitehead died in early January 1976, Courtney stood for the Labour nomination in the subsequent by-election. The party head office in Wellington, as well as party leader Bill Rowling, favoured law professor Geoffrey Palmer, but as he had not lived in the area for decades and had been a party member for less than two-years there was resistance to Palmer's nomination. A group of local party members threatened legal action over his membership tenure if he was nominated. To prevent a split in the membership Arthur Baysting, the secretary of the Nelson Labour Electorate Committee (LEC), pushed for Courtney to be selected believing him to be the most electable alternative to Palmer. Ultimately Courtney was chosen as Labour's candidate. Among those that were unsuccessful in their bid for the Labour Party nomination were Sonja Davies, Frank O'Flynn and the aforementioned Geoffrey Palmer.

Courtney waged a local issues campaign and proved "an excellent choice" as a candidate. He stressed Nelson's needs as a community as the major theme of his campaign, which was managed by MPs Colin Moyle and Arthur Faulkner. Moyle, Faulkner and Labour leader Bill Rowling spoke at meetings in support of Courtney and defended him from attacks by National that he was the wrong choice of a candidate and that Palmer was more suitable, highlighting that Courtney had lived and worked in Nelson for the last six years while Palmer had not. Labour fought a strong campaign and not only retained the seat but increased their majority as well, the victory at the polls vindicated the decision of the Labour Party's selection committee.

Courtney represented the Nelson electorate from 1976 to 1981 and was opposition spokesman for horticulture and fisheries for five years. He was a recipient of both the Queen's Silver Jubilee Medal in 1977 for service to the community and the New Zealand 1990 Commemoration Medal in recognition of services to New Zealand.

From the early 1970s to the mid 1980s, two key issues emerged on the road to the eventual declaration of a New Zealand nuclear-free zone in 1984: one was the opposition to French nuclear tests at Mururoa and the other was opposition to American warships' visits to New Zealand. In July 1976 Courtney presented a petition to Parliament, signed by over 20,000 people (including the Nelson based writer Maurice Gee), asking the Government to reconsider its decision to allow nuclear warships into New Zealand ports (the USS Truxtun and USS Long Beach were expected later in the year). There had been no such visit of American warships to New Zealand since 1964. In September 1976 Courtney followed up and put a parliamentary question to the Prime Minister, Robert Muldoon, to ascertain the cost of the USS Truxtun visit alone to the New Zealand taxpayer and it was estimated to be at least $110,000.

In December 1976, Courtney said in a written statement that the National Government had borrowed more than $1000 million after only a year in office. He said this contrasted with the Prime Minister presenting himself to the electorate as "the man who was going to stop borrowing".

In April 1977, Courtney wrote to the Minister of Health, Frank Gill, about the health risks associated with lead in petrol. There had been a survey in Christchurch "which concluded that lead levels from petrol emissions must be regarded as a serious problem". However, Gill replied in a statement that, "there was no proven health hazard...[and] the Government had no immediate plans to reduce the level". New Zealand only began to reduce lead in petrol in 1986 and did not remove it completely until 1996, twenty years after Courtney raised the issue. In 2017 Dr Nick Wilson, of the University of Otago's Department of Public Health in Wellington, called the delay in moving to unleaded petrol a "tragedy".

In August 1977, Courtney was very critical of Muldoon and his financial management: "This Muldoon economic muddle has placed the country in a very serious position...Far from being an economic wizard, the Minister of Finance would have trouble managing a penny-in-the-slot machine. I would not trust one of my businesses to his care."

The Labour Party suffered three defeats in the 1975, 1978 and 1981 general elections under the leadership of Bill Rowling. Courtney saw the momentum that had been gained under the prime ministership of the charismatic Labour leader Norman Kirk (1972–74) was being eroded and lost by Rowling. Courtney firmly believed that change was needed in the leadership in order to beat Robert Muldoon and the National Party. Rowling was not an effective counter to Muldoon: in Parliament Muldoon had the measure of Rowling and Rowling was perceived as weak in the media. Courtney has stated: "Rowling's handling of the Moyle 'affair' in 1977 by asking Colin Moyle to resign in response to Rob Muldoon's attacks in parliament was wrong." There were protests at the 1977 Labour Party Conference because of the treatment of Colin Moyle by Rowling. After Courtney's strong performance in the Nelson by-election in 1976 the 1978 Labour Party general election result was a "major disappointment" for Courtney. He had advocated during the campaign that the party "return to the old Labour Party philosophies of job opportunities for everyone, education, health and housing."

Following the 1978 election, Rowling alienated Māori by removing Matiu Rata, the party's experienced and well-regarded Māori Affairs spokesman (Rata had been instrumental in the establishment of the Waitangi Tribunal), from the Opposition front bench. Courtney has commented: "The leaders of political parties are not always right and they don't have a monopoly on good judgment". Rata would go onto form Mana Motuhake a precursor of Te Pati Māori.

In December 1978, Courtney after visiting the Ross Sea region stated that "New Zealand is getting tremendous value for its modest investment in Antarctic research." Going on to say "it is vital we maintain our presence there." New Zealand's marine environment, the climate and weather systems and patterns are intrinsically connected to Antarctica and the Southern Ocean. Courtney saw the key priorities for New Zealand as multidisciplinary scientific research, environmental assessment and protection, and fisheries monitoring and surveillance. He said, "The Americans have a budget of $52M and we are totally dependent on them for helicopters and shipping services...I feel we must invest in our own helicopters and a suitable ship which could be used for fisheries protection or other research for the rest of the year."

In May 1979, Courtney broke ranks with trade unions and publicly disagreed with a strike action by butchers. In August 1979 he openly contradicted Rowling (who held the neighbouring Tasman electorate) by stating his support for a private jet-foil service across the Cook Strait. Courtney "championed the cause of small businesses" within the Labour caucus and described them as the "lost tribe" of New Zealand's commercial world (Courtney has the distinction of being the last member of any Labour caucus with a retail business background after the retirement of Paddy Blanchfield MP for the West Coast at the 1978 election). He was concerned by the National Government's reduction in depreciation rates particularly the impact on small businesses and asked the Minister for Trade and Industry, Lance Adams-Schneider, "Why had the Government cut the first-year depreciation allowance on new plant and equipment by 35 per cent? Companies can develop and grow if the Government increases the first-year depreciation allowance...Did the Government appreciate the importance of new plant and equipment? Did the Government intend to help the small businesses that had a shortage of cash and working capital? If it did not intend to do anything about the first-year depreciation allowance, would it consider increasing the 10 per cent depreciation allowances on all stock." For workers he said that "we must ensure real reward for overtime and increased production." Taxation was another "killer...New Zealanders work for the tax system and National Superannuation in particular." He advocated for increased pre-tax income through "personal, family and child exemptions."

During the late 1970s, Courtney expressed concern about the lack of a government land use policy. Asking a question of the Under-Secretary for Agriculture, Rob Talbot, in parliament in September 1979 Courtney said: "Did [he] believe that land was a scarce resource, and that, next to people, land was New Zealand's greatest resource?" Adding: "Both the country's economy and its way of life are based on the wise use of land." National's policy was geared towards the development of marginal land. This involved providing various subsidies and incentive schemes (like the Livestock Incentive Scheme 1976 and Land Development Encouragement Loans through the Rural Bank from 1978). Instead of a focus on efficiency and productivity in regards to existing farming operations the government aim was to increase production by land development on poor and marginal land. These schemes colloquially known as the skinny sheep schemes saw a sharp rise in sheep numbers (in 1982 sheep numbers reached 70.3 million according to Statistics NZ in 2011). The schemes have had a lasting impact on the New Zealand landscape and environment (with the overuse of fertilisers) and are still being felt today.

In September 1979, Marilyn Waring, the National MP for Waipa, noted: "what Mel Courtney is doing at the moment is very significant. It seldom happens in two party politics." And, the Labour Party caucus "unanimously passed a resolution expressing confidence in Mr Courtney as a colleague." The Stoke – Tahunanui branch of the party in Nelson also gave their unanimous support to Courtney.

In June 1980, Courtney was against the "Think Big" policy for the fishing industry. As the opposition convener of the fisheries sub-committee on production and marketing, he asserted "the policy is falling apart" expressing the view of many commercial fishers: "The industry expanded so rapidly it was overcapitalized with too many boats...the inshore fleet expanded and joint venture and duty free boats exerted further pressure" Commercial Fishing Magazine, June 1980 pg.5.

=== Independent ===
There was media speculation that Courtney might defect from Labour and join National or Social Credit instead due to increasing differences over direction. However, in July 1980, he reaffirmed his ties with Labour stating that his first instincts were to "...stay within and try to change things from there." But he did say he was prepared to stand aside from the Labour candidacy rather than give up on his strong views on moral issues and those affecting his constituency. In the December 1980 leadership vote of confidence Courtney voted against Rowling. Rowling clung onto the Labour leadership by one vote, his own.

In February 1981 Courtney announced that he had let his membership of the Labour Party (which was due in January) lapse. In March 1981 Courtney withdrew from the Labour Party caucus and sat in the New Zealand House of Representatives as an independent. Courtney's announcement of his independent candidacy for the 1981 general election was made only a few days before the 35th anniversary of the death of Harry Atmore, MP for Nelson from 1911 to 1946. Atmore had been the last independent MP to be elected to the New Zealand Parliament.

In an interview in March 1981 Courtney said he would welcome members of the touring South Africa rugby team to Nelson "as the sportsmen they are [later in the year if the tour proceeded]...But then, the crunch comes, doesn't it? I must say I am uneasy about the estimated cost of $2 million for protection against any disruption. Is it all worth it?". In June 1981 the Opposition bid to have the parliament urge the Rugby Union not to proceed with the tour was lost 48 votes to 36. The two Social Credit MPs, Bruce Beetham and Gary Knapp, voted with the Government. Courtney, the "independent Labour MP for Nelson", was not present. No member crossed the floor of the House. Marilyn Waring "was absent, reportedly in her electorate".

In August 1981 Courtney asked in a parliamentary question to the Minister of Statistics, Hugh Templeton, why work in the home was not considered work but "household duties", and also the person who carried out this work was not considered to be in an occupation or a job in the census. The Minister replied that this would be reflected in the next census. By bringing this issue to the debating chamber, Courtney helped elevate the contribution of in-the-home work from a privatised "duty" into a matter that has become one of extensive economic interest and discussion.

In September 1981 Courtney introduced a private members' bill into parliament that enabled the Nelson based Cawthron Institute to widen its scope. It was an important milestone in the organisation's history paving the way for the trust "to enter joint ventures or develop its own manufacturing capability". The Government suspended standing orders to allow The Thomas Cawthron Trust Amendment Bill to be passed at a time when Government business normally took precedence. Neither the Government nor the Opposition opposed the Independent MP's bill.

In October 1981 Courtney supported a motion in parliament that would allow a Social Credit MP to become a representative on the Electoral Boundaries Commission alongside the two major parties, Labour and National. However, "Labour members took a rare step and voted with the Government" blocking there being another party's voice on the commission.

=== 1981 election ===
At the 1981 election supporters rallied around Courtney's independent campaign and, although defeated, it was by the very narrow margin of 698 votes. Courtney took 37.0 per cent of the total vote, 3.4 percentage points behind the Labour candidate, and nearly three times as many votes as the National candidate's share of the vote. This was the best result by an independent candidate in New Zealand elections in nearly 40 years with political scientists Stephen Levine and Alan McRobie commenting that the Nelson contest was "what would have been the most dramatic election upset of the last 45 years".

1981 general election: Nelson
Party	Candidate	Votes	%	±%
Labour	Philip Woollaston	8,198	40.41	
Independent	Mel Courtney	7,500	36.97	−13.49
National	Gaire Thompson	2,749	13.55	
Social Credit	Neville McLean	1,545	7.61	
Values	Mike Ward	297	1.46	
Majority		698	3.44	
Turnout		20,289	91.03	+14.47
Registered electors		22,288		

=== Return to local politics ===
Courtney came out of political retirement for the 2016 local elections. Of the 12 successful candidates, Courtney was elected with 6,743 votes. Courtney was re-elected with 8,601 votes in the 2019 local elections. He also stood unsuccessfully in the 2019 mayoral election, placing second to incumbent mayor Rachel Reese. In the 2022 local elections Courtney was elected in the Stoke-Tahunanui Ward achieving the election quota threshold on the first round or iteration of voting under the STV system. In the 2025 local elections Courtney was re-elected in the Stoke-Tahunanui Ward again achieving the election quota threshold on the first round or iteration of voting.

== Outside politics ==
Courtney owned and operated supermarkets in Nelson and at its peak, he had five of them. He retired to Australia in about 2000. He returned to live in Nelson in late 2014 or early 2015.

== Notes ==
New Zealand Parliament
Preceded by Stan Whitehead	Member of Parliament for Nelson; 1976–1981	Succeeded by Philip Woollaston
