= 2019 Nelson mayoral election =

Mayoral election results in Nelson, New Zealand

- 12 October 2019
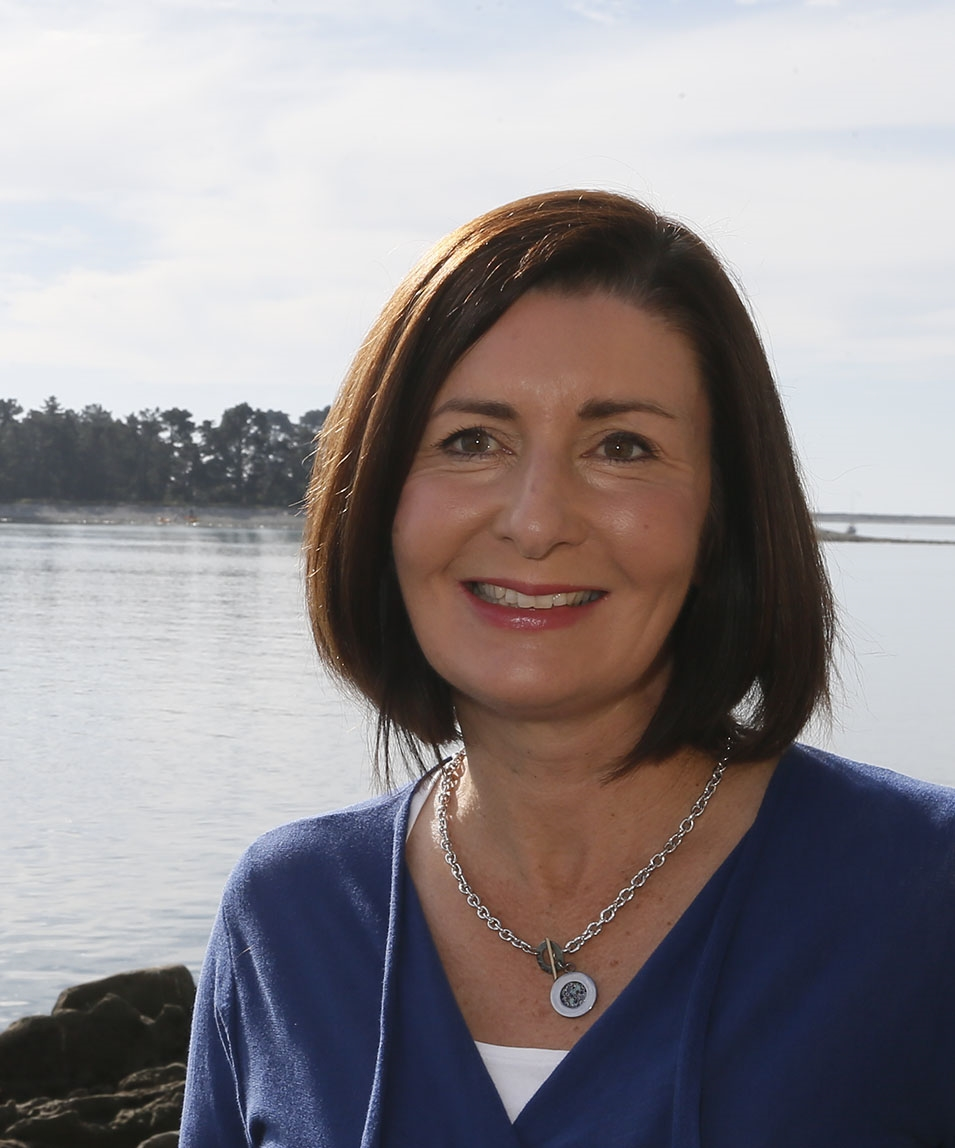

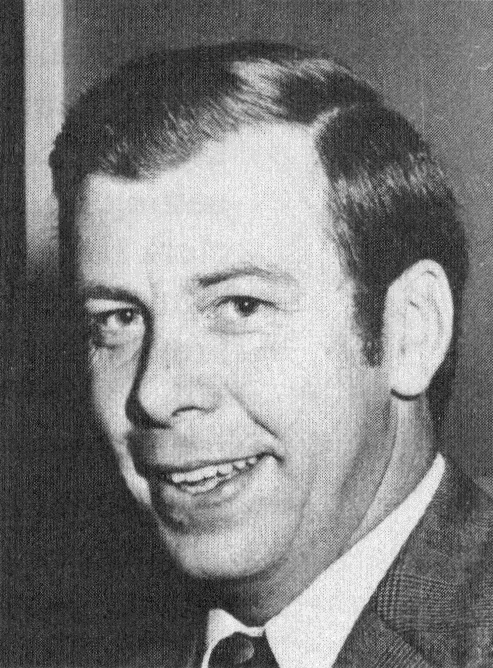

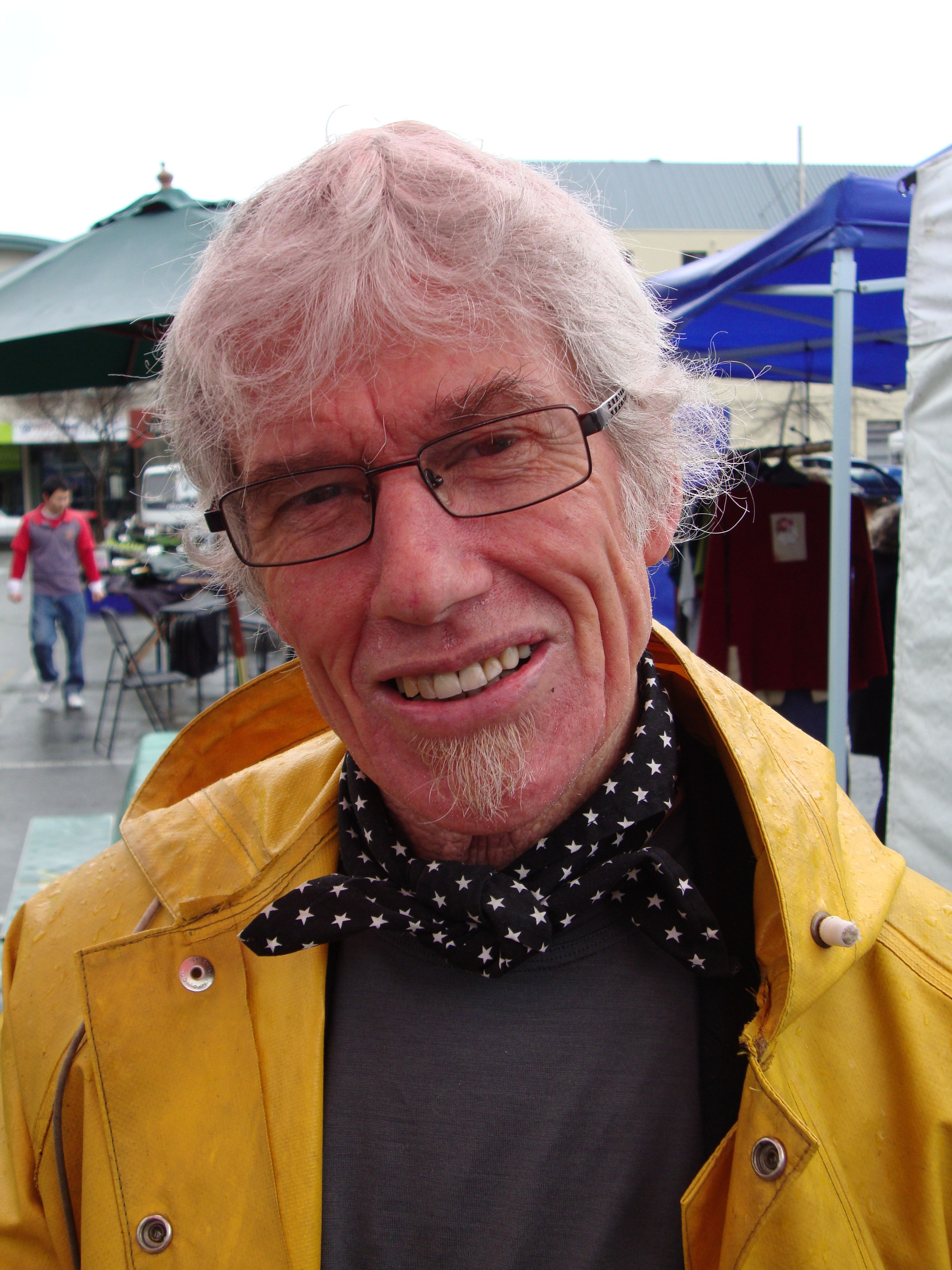
Candidate	Rachel Reese	Mel Courtney	Tim Skinner
Party	Independent
Popular vote	5,834	4,190	3,737
Percentage	30.30%	21.76%	19.41%
Candidate	Bill Dahlberg	Mike Ward
Party	Mayoralty Only
Popular vote	3,380	1,634
Percentage	17.55%	8.48%
Mayor before election
Rachel Reese
Elected mayor
Rachel Reese

The 2019 Nelson mayoral election was part of the New Zealand local elections that were held on 12 October 2019 to elect the Mayor of Nelson, New Zealand.

== Key dates ==
Key dates for the election were:

- 1 July: Electoral Commission enrolment campaign starts.
- 19 July: Nominations open for candidates. Rolls open for inspection.
- 16 August: Nominations close at 12 noon. Rolls close.
- 21 August: Election date and candidates' names announced.
- 20 to 25 September: Voting documents delivered to households. Electors can post the documents back to electoral officers as soon as they have voted.
- 12 October: Polling day. Voting documents must be at council before voting closes at 12 noon. Preliminary results will be available as soon as all ordinary votes are counted.
- 17 to 23 October: Official results, including all valid ordinary and special votes, declared.

== Candidates ==
=== Declared candidates ===
- Mel Courtney, Nelson City Councillor and former Nelson MP
- Bill Dahlberg, Nelson City Councillor
- Rachel Reese, incumbent Mayor of Nelson
- Tim Skinner, Nelson City Councillor
- Mike Ward, former Nelson City Councillor and List MP, candidate for mayor in 1986, 1989, 2007, and 2010
- John Wakelin
- Avner Nahmias

== Results ==
2019 Nelson mayoral election
Party	Candidate	Votes	%	±%
Independent	Rachel Reese	5,834	30.30	−30.44
None	Mel Courtney	4,190	21.76	
None	Tim Skinner	3,737	19.41	
Mayoralty Only	Bill Dahlberg	3,380	17.55	
None	Mike Ward	1,634	8.48	
Independent	Avner Nahmias	292	1.51	
Patriotic	John Wakelin	186	0.96	
Total valid votes		19,253	99.73	
Informal votes		52	0.27	+0.10
Majority		1,644	8.54	−25.21
Turnout		19,305		
