= 1989 Nelson-Marlborough Regional Council election =

- 14 October 1989
- 13 seats on the Nelson-Marlborough Regional Council; 7 seats needed for a majority
Party	Seats	+/–
Independent	13	+13
This lists parties that won seats. See the complete results below.

Chair election
- ?

7 of 13 votes needed for majority
Candidate	Len Ardell
Party	Independent
Electoral vote	?
Elected chair
Len Ardell
Independent

The 1989 Nelson-Marlborough Regional Council election was a local election held from September to 14 October 1989 in the Nelson-Marlborough region of New Zealand, as part of that year's regional council elections and other local elections held nation-wide. Postal voting and the first-past-the-post voting system were used.

This was the first and only election to the regional council; the authority had been formed as part of the 1989 reforms to local government and was later disestablished in 1992. Thirteen positions were contested across four constituencies, corresponding with the region's territorial authority areas at the time.

== Campaign ==
There was healthy competition for the available positions. There were 14 candidates in Nelson, 30 in Marlborough, 23 in Tasman, and 6 in Kaikoura, i.e. 73 candidates in total.

All candidates stood as independents, although the Krammer brothers held party affiliations. Ted Krammer had stood in the 1981 general election for the National Party in the Tasman electorate, and John Krammer unsuccessfully sought the Labour Party nomination for the Nelson electorate in the 1990 general election.

== Results ==
The following table shows the members elected:

Name	Regional constituency
Bryan Seddon	Kaikoura
Leo McKendry	Marlborough
Glenys Baldick	Marlborough
Lin Randle	Marlborough
Basil Parkes	Marlborough
Len Ardell	Nelson
Craig Potton	Nelson
Derek Shaw	Nelson
Ted Krammer	Nelson
John Krammer	Tasman
Murray Borlase	Tasman
David Ogilvie	Tasman
Elaine Henry	Tasman

=== Kaikoura constituency ===
Kaikoura constituency
Affiliation	Candidate	Votes	%
Independent	Bryan Seddon	481	27.52
Independent	Jim Gameson	423	24.20
Independent	Don McKenzie	280	16.02
Independent	Errol Parker	246	14.07
Independent	Richard Latter	217	12.41
Independent	Lindsay Clemett	101	5.78
Informal		?	?
Turnout		1,748 (Note: Turnout figure is for the relevant mayoral election; this is only approximately accurate as people may have only voted in one or the other.)	(~84.00)
Registered		?	
Independent win (new constituency)			

=== Marlborough constituency ===
Marlborough constituency
Affiliation	Candidate	Votes	%
Independent	Leo McKendry	7,013	40.45
Independent	Glenys Baldick	5,378	31.02
Independent	Lin Randle	4,708	27.16
Independent	Basil Parkes	3,687	21.27
Independent	Allan Beaton	3,553	20.49
Independent	Elizabeth Davidson	3,225	18.60
Independent	Bruno Dalliessi	3,025	17.45
Independent	Larry Pigou	2,750	15.86
Independent	John Lundon	2,717	15.67
Independent	Jim Crichton	2,498	14.41
Independent	Tony Grigg	1,766	10.19
Independent	Frank Stretch	1,662	9.59
Independent	James Elkington	1,537	8.87
Independent	Lester Munro	1,443	8.32
Independent	Ross Kennington	1,373	7.92
Independent	Bruce Woolley	1,305	7.53
Independent	Margaret Peace	1,259	7.26
Independent	Rex Frost	1,216	7.01
Independent	Peter (Bluey) Hope	1,141	6.58
Independent	Jack Broughan	1,137	6.56
Independent	Allan Gifford	1,022	5.90
Independent	Brian Schwass	922	5.32
Independent	Paul Millen	906	5.23
Independent	Pauline Macnab	856	4.94
Independent	Peter Thomson	655	3.78
Independent	Allison Register	588	3.39
Independent	Andrew Whelan	495	2.86
Independent	Graeme Clarke	494	2.85
Independent	Stuart McCallum	490	2.83
Independent	Jim Fraser	441	2.54
Informal		78	0.45
Turnout		17,336	(~73.80)
Registered		?	
Independent win (new constituency)			
Independent win (new constituency)			
Independent win (new constituency)			
Independent win (new constituency)			

=== Nelson constituency ===
Nelson constituency
Affiliation	Candidate	Votes	%
Independent	Len Ardell	3,919	23.63
Independent	Craig Potton	3,827	23.08
Independent	Derek Shaw	3,091	18.64
Independent	Ted Krammer	3,059	18.45
Independent	Gwenny Davis	2,927	17.65
Independent	Trevor Horne	2,633	15.88
Independent	Roy McLennan	2,506	15.11
Independent	Colin Neale	1,980	11.94
Independent	Judith Billens	1,776	10.71
Independent	Nick Barber	1,572	9.48
Independent	Mike Johnston	1,018	6.14
Independent	John Bealing	742	4.47
Independent	Tony Vari	542	3.27
Independent	Roger Wincer	363	2.19
Informal		?	?
Turnout		16,583	(~70.00)
Registered		?	
Independent win (new constituency)			
Independent win (new constituency)			
Independent win (new constituency)			
Independent win (new constituency)			

=== Tasman constituency ===
Tasman constituency
Affiliation	Candidate	Votes	%
Independent	John Krammer	3,761	?
Independent	Murray Borlase	3,667	?
Independent	David Ogilvie	3,549	?
Independent	Elaine Henry	3,527	?
Independent	Kate Light	3,136	?
Independent	Owen Jennings	3,121	?
Independent	Bill Eggers	2,823	?
Independent	Liz Thomas	2,750	?
Independent	Keith Fry	2,542	?
Independent	Courtney Lawry	2,388	?
Independent	Bruce Rowling	1,909	?
Independent	Michael Higgins	1,811	?
Independent	Rob Maling	1,767	?
Independent	Andrew Joseph	1,719	?
Independent	Graham Lines	1,709	?
Independent	Gwyn Thurlow	1,581	?
Independent	Basil Hodgkinson	1,573	?
Independent	Christopher St Johanser	1,503	?
Independent	Clive Bird	1,492	?
Independent	David Thompson	1,420	?
Independent	Denis Schwass	771	?
Independent	Thomas Russell	481	?
Informal		?	?
Turnout		? (Note: Turnout figures for the Tasman mayoral election were not reported by The Press)	?
Registered		?	
Independent win (new constituency)			
Independent win (new constituency)			
Independent win (new constituency)			
Independent win (new constituency)			

== Aftermath ==
=== Chair election ===
Once the council convened, the councillors elected Len Ardell as their chairperson.
