= Mayor of Marlborough, New Zealand =

Head of New Zealand's Marlborough District

Mayor of Marlborough
- Coat of arms of the Marlborough District

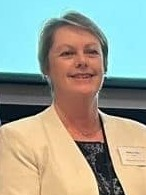
- Incumbent; Nadine Taylor since 2022
- Style: His/Her Worship
- Term length: Three years, renewable
- Inaugural holder: Leo McKendry
- Formation: 1989
- Deputy: David Croad
- Salary: $149,909
- Website: Official website

The mayor of Marlborough officiates over the Marlborough District of New Zealand, which is administered by the Marlborough District Council, with Blenheim as its main town. The role was created as a result of the 1989 local government reforms, when Blenheim Borough was amalgamated with Picton Borough, and Marlborough County to form Marlborough District.

The current mayor, Nadine Taylor, was first elected to the position in 2022. She is the seventh person to hold this role. All former mayors are living.

== History ==
Marlborough District was formed through the 1989 local government reform, when many counties and boroughs were amalgamated throughout New Zealand. Marlborough District's predecessors were Blenheim Borough, Picton Borough, and Marlborough County Council. Formed in 1869, Blenheim Borough had 31 mayors. Picton Borough goes back to 1876 and had 23 mayors. Marlborough County goes back to 1923 and had 11 council chairmen.

The last mayor of Blenheim, Leo McKendry, was the first mayor of Marlborough, serving two terms (1989–1995). Liz Davidson was the first woman mayor and served in that role from 1995 to 1998. Between 1983 and her retirement in 2010, she served a total of 27 years on local bodies.

Davidson was succeeded in her mayoralty by Gerald Hope, who served for one term (1998–2001). Hope became well known nationally in early 1998 for the disappearance of his daughter and her friend, a murder for which Scott Watson was convicted. Hope was successfully challenged by councillor Tom Harrison in 2001, who served one term until 2004. Hope was elected as a district councillor in 2004.

Alistair Sowman served one term on the district council from 2001 before being first elected mayor in 2004. He announced in November 2012 that he would contest the mayoralty again in October 2013.

Harrison, Hope, and Davidson all served as district councillors after having been mayors, and all three failed to get re-elected in the 2010 local election, after former mayor McKendry stated early in the election campaign that past mayors should not stand again as councillors.

All former mayors are living.

== List of mayors ==
The following list shows the mayors of Marlborough:

	Name	Portrait	Term
1	Leo McKendry		1989–1995
2	Liz Davidson		1995–1998
3	Gerald Hope		1998–2001
4	Tom Harrison		2001–2004
5	Alistair Sowman		2004–2016
6	John Leggett		2016–2022
7	Nadine Taylor		2022–present
