= Trevor Horne (New Zealand politician) =

Former mayor of Nelson (1920–1991)

Trevor Horne QSO JP

22nd Mayor of Nelson
- In office 1968–1971
- Preceded by: Douglas Strawbridge
- Succeeded by: Roy McLennan

Personal details
- Born: Trevor Freeman Horne; 30 September 1920 Christchurch, New Zealand
- Died: 3 July 1991 (aged 70) Nelson, New Zealand
- Spouse: Ngaire Johnston (m. 1951)

Trevor Freeman Horne QSO JP (30 September 1920 – 3 July 1991) was a New Zealand politician. He served as mayor of Nelson from 1968 to 1971.

== Early life and family ==
Horne was born in Christchurch. He was the son of Freeman Horne and Mable Smith. He was educated at Gisborne Boys' High School. In 1951 he married Ngaire Johnston and they had two children, a boy and a girl.

== Career ==
He began work in 1935 as a clerk with a public accountant, joined the Farmers Co-op in 1936, and in 1937 became an apprentice cabinet maker. After the Second World War he formed his own tourism business and was a director of Tourist Services Limited.

== War service ==
Horne joined the Royal New Zealand Air Force in 1940, serving in No 2 Ground Reconnaissance Squadron as an Acting Flight Sergeant. He left the Air Force in 1946. During the war he studied a Canterbury University commerce course.

== Political career ==
Horne was elected to the Nelson City Council in 1956, became Mayor for one term from 1968 to 1971 replacing Douglas Strawbridge, and Deputy Mayor from 1974 to 1980. During his time as mayor the Government sought to demolish the old Nelson Provincial Council building to make way for a new court house. Horne and fellow Council member Sonja Davies unsuccessfully campaigned to have the building preserved. The majority of councillors did not support them and in September 1969 the building was demolished.

Horne stood in the 1989 Nelson-Marlborough Regional Council election in the Nelson constituency for a seat on the Nelson-Marlborough Regional Council, but was unsuccessful.

== Public service ==
He was a member of Jaycees, Lions, Toastmasters and the Nelson Chamber of Commerce. Horne was also President of the Nelson Judo Kwai and Nelson Skating Club.

In the 1979 New Year Honours, Horne was appointed a Companion of the Queen's Service Order for public services. In 1990, he was awarded the New Zealand 1990 Commemoration Medal.

When he died in 1991, Horne bequeathed $60,000 to the Nelson City, which was used to develop the Trevor Horne Heritage Trail.

Political offices
| Preceded by Douglas Strawbridge | Mayor of Nelson; 1968–1971 | Succeeded by Roy McLennan |
