= Trevor Horne =

Trevor Horne may refer to:

- Trevor Horne (New Zealand politician), mayor of Nelson, New Zealand from 1968 to 1971
- Trevor Horne (Canadian politician), Member of the Legislative Assembly of Alberta from 2015

== See also ==
- Trevor Horn, English record producer
