= Stanley Russell =

Former Mayor of Nelson (1906–2005)

Stan Russell OBE

20th Mayor of Nelson
- In office 1956–1962
- Preceded by: Joseph Harley
- Succeeded by: Douglas Strawbridge

Personal details
- Born: Stanley Ivan Russell; 26 March 1906 Christchurch, New Zealand
- Died: 29 November 2005 (aged 99) Nelson, New Zealand
- Occupation: Furniture retailer

Stanley Ivan Russell OBE (26 March 1906 – 29 November 2005) was a New Zealand local-body politician. He served as Mayor of Nelson from 1956 to 1962.

== Early life and family ==
Russell was born in Christchurch, the son of George Philip Russell. His family moved to the King Country, then Motueka and Tākaka before settling in Nelson in 1919. He was educated at Nelson College from 1920 to 1923.

In 1929, his father founded G P Russell and Sons (now Russells Curtains and Blinds) as a new and used furniture business located at 176 Bridge Street, Nelson. Russell worked in the family business, eventually becoming its managing director.

== Political career ==
His father was on the City Council until 1944. Russell was elected to Council that same year. He remained on the City Council until 1965 and was the mayor of Nelson from 1956 to 1962.

While there he campaigned for pensioner flats, resulting in the "Russell Flats" in Waimea Road being constructed. He was also involved in establishing the Nelson Civic Trust in early 1973.

Russell supported his fellow Council member, Sonja Davies, in seeking to have the Nelson Institute library transferred to the Nelson City Council. The Institute finally agreed in 1964. A fee was charged for taking out books until 1972, when it became free.

He was chair of the YMCA and was a Labour Party supporter.

In the 1961 New Year Honours, Russell was appointed an Officer of the Order of the British Empire, for services to local government.

Russell died at Nelson, aged 99, on 29 November 2005, and his ashes were buried at Wakapuaka Cemetery.

Political offices
| Preceded by Joseph Harley | Mayor of Nelson; 1956–1962 | Succeeded by Douglas Strawbridge |
