= Craig Potton =

New Zealand photographer (born 1952)

Craig Potton MNZM
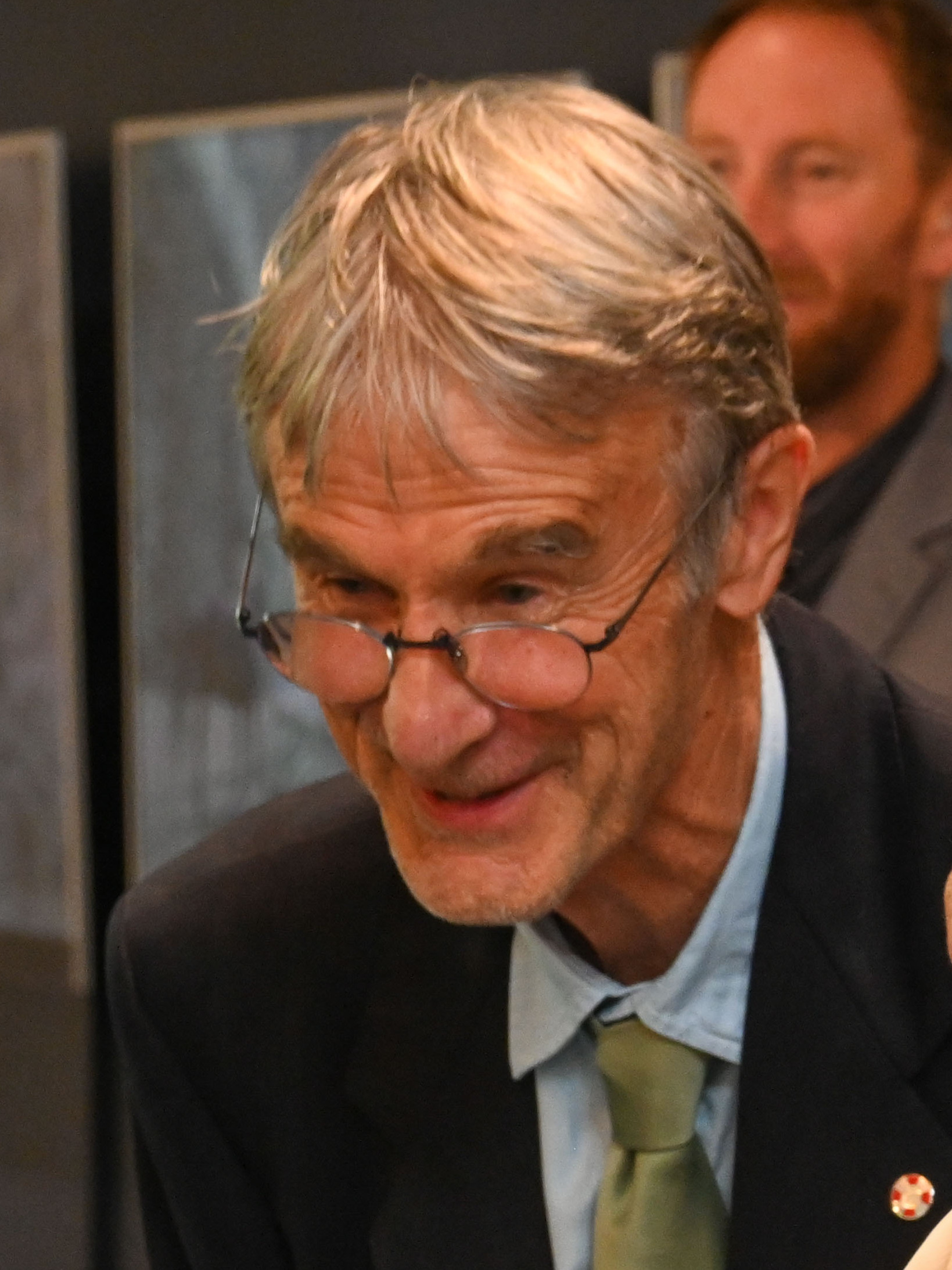
- Potton in 2026
- Born: 15 January 1952 (age 74); Nelson, New Zealand
- Education: Nelson College
- Alma mater: University of Canterbury
- Occupations: Photographer, writer, publisher
- Political party: Green Party

Craig Potton MNZM (born 15 January 1952) is a New Zealand photographer, environmentalist, businessman, publisher, and founder of the New Zealand publishing company Potton & Burton. Potton, who resides in Nelson, has been active in local government, and stood as a Green candidate in the 1999 and 2002 general elections.

== Early life and family ==
Potton was born in Nelson on 15 January 1952, the younger son of Rhoda Potton and her husband businessman Dick Potton who established Zip Industries and owned Nelson's cinema complex State Cinemas. He was educated at Nelson College from 1963 to 1969, where he played in the school's 'A' basketball team in 1968 and was a prefect in his final year. From a young age, Potton had an interest in environmentalism and took part in the Save Manapouri campaign while still a student at Nelson College.

Potton went on to study at university: first at the University of Auckland in 1970 and then the University of Canterbury in 1971 and 1972, graduating with a Bachelor of Arts degree in English. He spent 1973 at Christchurch Teachers' College, and then returned to the University of Canterbury for postgraduate studies between 1974 and 1976, completing a Master of Arts with honours in religious studies.

In 1988, Potton married Beverly Nina Beizman, who was Jewish, and the couple had one child. Beverly died from ovarian cancer in 2005. Potton later married his second wife, Catherine, with whom he has a daughter; Catherine also has two daughters from a previous relationship.

== Environmental activities ==
After teaching for two years at Nelson College, Potton left to concentrate full-time on conservation. Potton joined the conservation group Forest & Bird; besides serving as a board member of Forest & Bird and chairman of the group's Nelson branch, Potton also served as the group's representative on the New Zealand Conservation Authority and played a role in the creation of the Kahurangi and Rakiura National Parks. He was also a member of the National Forestry Council and the Federated Mountain Clubs executive.

== Photography, publishing, and television ==
Potton developed as a landscape photographer during the 1970s and 1980s, and, dissatisfied with the quality of printing and editing of his early photographic books, in 1987 he founded his own publishing company, Craig Potton Publishing. In 1990, Robbie Burton, joined the company, becoming managing editor and publisher; as of 2009 the company employs 15 people. In 2015, the company was renamed Potton & Burton after Burton assumed co-ownership. In addition to books on New Zealand nature and wildlife, the company has published journalist Nicky Hager's books Secret Power, Dirty Politics, The Hollow Men, and Seeds of Distrust.

Potton worked as a stills photographer on the sets of The Lord of the Rings trilogy, Peter Pan (2003), and The Chronicles of Narnia: The Lion, the Witch and the Wardrobe (2005). His photography has been displayed at exhibitions in New Zealand and internationally, including at the Christchurch Art Gallery, the National Gallery of Australia, the Rowe Gallery in North Carolina, and the Luksfera Gallery in Warsaw and Jerusalem.

Potton was the writer and presenter for the television documentary series Rivers with Craig Potton (2010) and Wild Coasts with Craig Potton (2011), produced by South Pacific Pictures. He won the award for best documentary script at the 2011 New Zealand Script Writers Awards for his Rivers episode, "Rangitata".

== Other business activities ==
Following the death of his father in 2007, Potton has been the co-owner with his older brother, Richard, of State Cinemas in Nelson and Motueka. He also owns his own Gallery Store in Nelson.

== Political and community involvement ==
Active in local-body politics in Nelson, Potton served on the Nelson City Council for 12 years. He is also a past member of the Nelson Catchment Board, the Nelson-Marlborough Regional Council (he gained a seat in the Nelson constituency in the 1989 Nelson-Marlborough Regional Council election), the Nelson Conservation Board, and the Nelson Arts Council, and has served as chair of the Nelson Provincial Museum.

Potton is also a member of the Green Party of Aotearoa New Zealand, and stood unsuccessfully as a Green Party list candidate at the 1999 and 2002 general elections, where he was ranked 28th and 22nd, respectively, on the party's list.

== Honours ==
In the 2013 Queen's Birthday Honours, Potton was appointed a Member of the New Zealand Order of Merit, for services to photography and conservation.
