= Paul Matheson =

New Zealand politician

Paul Matheson QSO JP

26th Mayor of Nelson
- In office 1998–2007
- Preceded by: Philip Woollaston
- Succeeded by: Kerry Marshall

Personal details
- Born: Paul Kenneth Matheson; 1947 (age 78–79) Huntly, New Zealand

Paul Kenneth Matheson QSO JP (born 1947) is a former New Zealand local-body politician. He was mayor of Nelson from 1998 to 2007, and was subsequently a Nelson city councillor from 2010 to 2019.

== Early life and family ==
Born in Huntly in 1947, the son of an accountant, Matheson was raised in Auckland from about the age of five.

== Political career ==
He first became involved in politics through membership of the New Zealand Young Nationals in the late 1960s, and served as that organisation's president from 1972 to 1973. He stood as the National candidate for the Sydenham electorate at the 1975 general election, but was defeated by the incumbent, John Kirk.

Matheson was elected to the Nelson City Council in 1989. At the next local-body election in 1992 he did not stand for council, but instead ran for the mayoralty and was defeated by Philip Woollaston. Matheson was returned as a city councillor in 1995 and was elected mayor of Nelson in 1998, this time defeating Woollaston. He was re-elected mayor in 2001 and 2004, but stood down at the 2007 election. He also served as the national chair of the Mayors Taskforce for Jobs youth scheme.

In the 2008 New Year Honours, Matheson was appointed a Companion of the Queen's Service Order for services to local-body affairs and the community.

In 2010, Matheson returned to local-body politics and was elected once again as a Nelson city councillor. He was, however, unsuccessful in his bid for a seat on the Nelson Marlborough District Health Board. He was re-elected as a city councillor in 2013 and was appointed deputy mayor of Nelson.

Matheson was the campaign manager for Nelson MP Nick Smith at the 2011 general election.

Matheson retired from politics for a second time in 2019.

== Personal life ==
Matheson's wife, Juliana, died of cancer just six weeks before he took office as mayor, and since that time he has been a fundraiser for the Nelson Cancer Society's Daffodil Day appeal. He has three adult children.

Political offices
Preceded by Philip Woollaston	Mayor of Nelson; 1998–2007	Succeeded by Kerry Marshall
