= Leo McKendry =

New Zealand mayor (born 1934)

Leo McKendry QSO

1st Mayor of Marlborough
- In office 1989–1995
- Succeeded by: Liz Davidson

31st Mayor of Blenheim
- In office 1986–1989
- Preceded by: Philip Taylor
- Succeeded by: Office abolished

Personal details
- Born: Leo Francis McKendry; 14 August 1934 (age 91) Nelson, New Zealand
- Spouse: Julie Moore (m. 1962)
- Children: 5
- Education: Nelson College

Leo Francis McKendry QSO (born 14 August 1934) is a former local politician in the Marlborough Region of New Zealand. He was the 31st and last mayor of Blenheim (1986–1989), and the 1st mayor of Marlborough (1989–1995).

== Early life and family ==
McKendry was born in Nelson on 14 August 1934, and educated at Nelson College from 1948 to 1950. In 1962, he married Julie Margaret Moore, and the couple went on to have five children.

== Political career ==
McKendry first became a councillor for Blenheim Borough in 1980, serving for one three-year term. In the 1986 local election, he was elected mayor of Blenheim. He was the 31st and last holder of that position, as the 1989 local government reforms resulted in the amalgamation of Blenheim Borough with Picton Borough and Marlborough County to form Marlborough District.

McKendry was then elected the first mayor of Marlborough and served for two terms (1989–1995). In the 1989 Nelson-Marlborough Regional Council election, he was the highest-polling candidate in the Marlborough constituency and was thus elected to the Nelson-Marlborough Regional Council. He served on the regional council until its abolition on 1 July 1992.

Early in the campaign for the 2010 local election for Marlborough District Council, he stated that past mayors should not stand again as councillors, saying, "I've just always believed it was an unwritten rule once you were defeated or retired, it was time to go completely". Subsequently, Liz Davidson, Gerald Hope, and Tom Harrison, the three mayors who succeeded him, all failed to get re-elected as councillors.

In 1990, McKendry was awarded the New Zealand 1990 Commemoration Medal. In the 2001 Queen's Birthday Honours, he was appointed a Companion of the Queen's Service Order for public services.

== Other activities ==
In 1962, McKendry competed in the Mobilgas Economy Run, a car race from Nelson to Dunedin. He came in third in the 900 cc category. In 2006, he competed in a similar competition, the AA ENERGYWISE Rally, from Auckland to Wellington and return over four days.

McKendry was the principal of a car dealership in Blenheim. He holds or has held positions on several bodies, including council member of the Nelson Marlborough Institute of Technology, trustee of the Marlborough Regional Development Trust, and trustee of the Marlborough Electric Power Trust.

McKendry was an editorial team member responsible for "steering the project" on the production of a history for the 150th anniversary of Marlborough. McKendry Park in Blenheim, a former plum orchard in the Blenheim suburb of Springlands, is named in his honour.

McKendry keeps himself fit through playing golf. Age Concern New Zealand has profiled him as an example of older people living a healthy lifestyle.
