= Joseph Auty Harley (born 1895) =

New Zealand military personnel (1895–1973)

Joseph Harley OBE

19th Mayor of Nelson
- In office 1947–1956
- Preceded by: Edgar Neale
- Succeeded by: Stanley Russell

Personal details
- Born: Joseph Auty Harley; 29 September 1895 Nelson, New Zealand
- Died: 26 September 1973 (aged 77) Nelson, New Zealand

Joseph Auty Harley OBE (29 September 1895 – 26 September 1973) was the Mayor of Nelson, New Zealand from 1947 to 1956.

== Early life ==
Harley was the son of Charles Robert Harley and was born on 29 September 1895. He was educated at Hampden Street Primary School and attended Nelson College from 1910 to 1912. After college he was apprenticed to Anchor Foundry in Nelson.

== Military service ==
During World War I Harley enlisted in the New Zealand Army and served as a lieutenant in New Zealand Rifle Brigade. He was wounded twice, once on 16 September 1916 in the Somme, probably during the second day of the Brigades involvement in the Battle of Flers-Courcelette and again on 14 May 1918.

== Business career ==
Returning to New Zealand, Harley joined his family's brewing business.

In 1945, his family merged their brewing business with Dobson's Breweries and Harley became the managing director of the new companies: Nelson Breweries Limited, Nelson Hotels Limited, Accommodation Nelson Limited, and Hotel Investments Limited.

== Political career ==
In 1936 Harley was elected as a City Councillor and became Mayor in 1947 when Edgar Neale was elected to Parliament. He remained in office until 1956 when he was succeeded by Stanley Russell. He was appointed an Officer of the Order of the British Empire in the 1953 Coronation Honours.

== Public service ==
Harley was Vice President of the Municipal Association of New Zealand, South Island Local Bodies Association, and Nelson College Old Boys' Association; Chairman of the Nelson-West Coast League of Local Bodies; President of the Brewers Association of New Zealand, Nelson Historical Committee, Rotary Nelson, and the Nelson Branch of the Institute of Horticulture; and Patron of the Nelson Civic Music Council, and Nelson Power Boat Club.

He was also a member of the Cawthron Trust, Nelson Progress Association, Pelorus Scenic Board, Abel Tasman Park Board, and Nelson Housing Commission.

== Personal life ==
Harley married Hilda Condell in 1920 and they had three children: two sons and a daughter. He died at Nelson on 26 September 1973, and his ashes were buried at Wakapuaka Cemetery.

Political offices
Preceded by Edgar Neale	Mayor of Nelson; 1947–1956	Succeeded by Stanley Russell
