= Edgar Neale =

New Zealand politician

Edgar Neale OBE JP
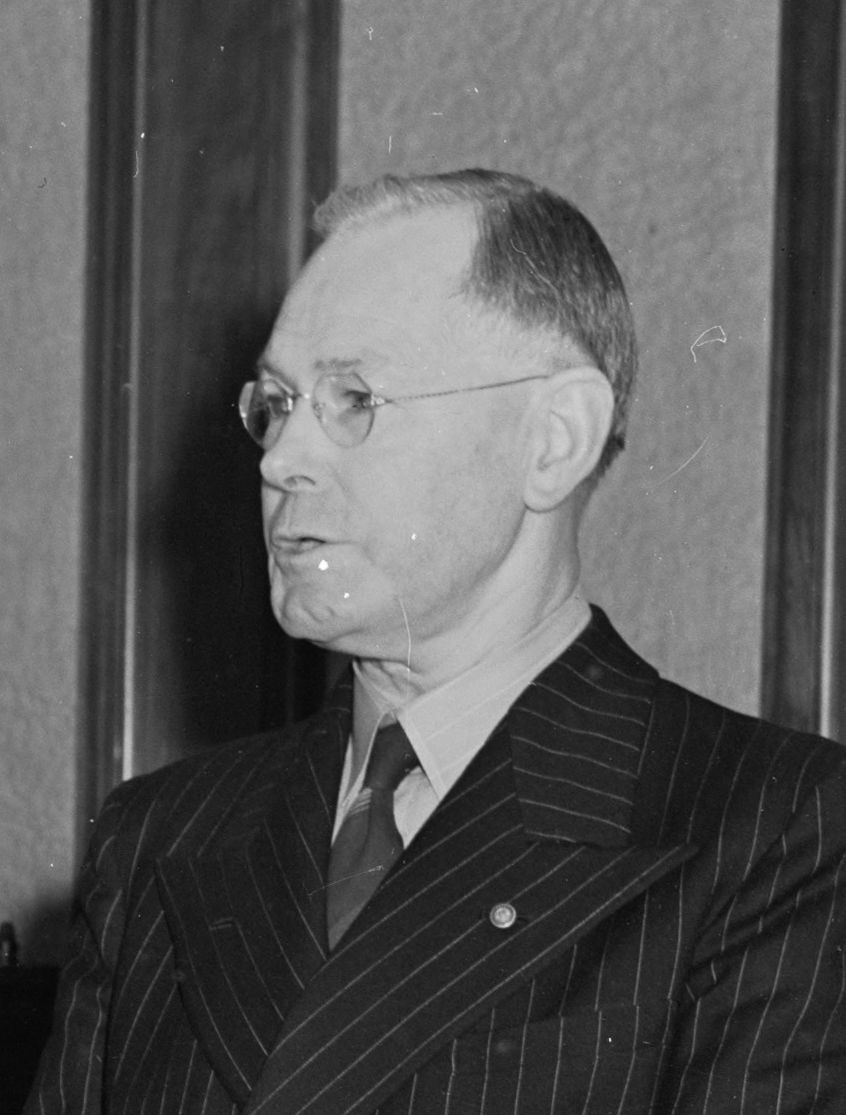
- Edgar Neale in 1950

Member of the New Zealand Parliament for Nelson
- In office 1946–1957
- Preceded by: Harry Atmore
- Succeeded by: Stan Whitehead

18th Mayor of Nelson, New Zealand
- In office 1941–1947
- Preceded by: George Page
- Succeeded by: Joseph Auty Harley

Personal details
- Born: 24 November 1889 Nelson, New Zealand
- Died: 25 July 1960 (aged 70) Nelson, New Zealand
- Profession: Accountant
- Cricket career

Cricket information
- Batting: Right-handed

Domestic team information
- Years: Team
- 1920/21: Minor Associations
- 1921/22: South Island
- First-class debut: 8 March 1921 Minor Associations v Australia
- Last First-class: 10 March 1922 South Island v North Island

Career statistics
Competition	First-class
Matches	2
Runs scored	74
Batting average	24.66
100s/50s	0/0
Top score	37*
Balls bowled	8
Wickets	1
Bowling average	6.00
5 wickets in innings	0
10 wickets in match	0
Best bowling	1-6
Catches/stumpings	0/0
- Source: CricketArchive, 27 March 2016

Edgar Rollo Neale OBE JP (24 November 1889 – 25 July 1960), often called Gar Neale, was Mayor and Member of Parliament for Nelson, New Zealand, a strong supporter of the Nelson railway, and a representative cricketer.

== Background ==
Gar Neale's great grandfather and family migrated to New Zealand from Stroud, Gloucestershire, England, in the 1840s, settling in Auckland. In the 1850s, Neale's grandfather, John William Neale, moved to Nelson. Gar Neale's father, Henry Neale, was born in Nelson and worked as a carpenter. Henry married Kate Bethwaite. Henry and Kate had two children; Gar (born in 1889 in Nelson) and Gladys (born in 1893).

=== Education ===
Neale was educated at Nelson Central School and Nelson College (1903–1905), where he took a general academic course. He became a part-time master at the college (1920–1932), teaching Commercial Practice. He was Secretary of the Nelson College Old Boys Association (1921–1935), and its President (1938–1947). He also served on the Colleges Board of Governors.

During his stay in Blenheim (1915–1919), Neale completed his accountancy diplomas.

=== Career ===
Neale was first employed as a law clerk with Maginnity and Son (later Maginnity, Samuel and Hunter). About 1911 he transferred to Adams and Harley as an accounts clerk. From 1915 to 1919 he was employed by Griffiths Brothers Limited in Blenheim.

Returning to Nelson from Blenheim in 1920, he went into partnership with J E Milner as a public accountant, auditor, and secretary. The firm later became E R Neale and Son, when his son joined him. At the time of his death in 1960 he was the senior member of the firm, Neale, Son, and Yates.

=== Family ===
Neale married Florence Myrtle Parsonage, the daughter of Henry Bruce Parsonage and Ellen Penn, on 26 December 1911. They had four sons. In the 1951 New Year Honours, Florence Neale was appointed a Member of the Order of the British Empire for public services in Nelson.

His sister, Gladys Neale, married Howard Knight.

After Florence Neale died in 1954, Neale married Rata Forbes in 1957.

=== Residences ===
Neale purchased 241 Bridge Street, Nelson in the late 1920s from the Tilyard family. The two-storey wooden home had been built in the early 1900s. The Neales named the home Green Gables and lived there until about the time his first wife, Florence, died in 1954. In 1957 the house was sold to Presbyterian Support Services and became a rest home. Neale moved to a new home in Moana Avenue on the Port Hills overlooking Tahuna Beach where he resided until his death.

== Sport ==
In 1902, he was reported as participating in the Nelson Athletic and Cycling Club Labour Weekend Central School 100-yard and 220-yard running races. Although not placed he appears to have had an interest in sports from an early age.

He was an avid sportsman, playing representative cricket (1904–1945) for Nelson and Marlborough, hockey (1915–1926) for Marlborough, Nelson, and the South Island (1923), soccer (1905) for Nelson, and golf (1937) for Nelson. He loved horse racing and was Secretary of the Nelson Trotting Club from 1923 and the Nelson Jockey Club (1923–1949).

=== Cricket ===
Neale represented Nelson in cricket from 1904 while still at college aged 16 years. He first captained Nelson in 1910 when he was only 21 years old. By 1926 he had played 52 matches for Nelson including playing for the Hawke Cup. He continued to represent Nelson until 1945, with a short break (1915–1920) playing representative cricket for Marlborough when he lived in Blenheim. During this period he was noted as "giving powerful help to Marlborough".

He represented the South Island (1922) and the New Zealand Minor Associations (1921) in first-class cricket. By 1928 Neale had made over 1,000 runs for his club. His statistics for representative cricket were 73 innings, 3 not outs, 201 highest score, 2,223 total runs, and 31.7 run average. He also achieved his highest score of 201 runs against Wellington during this period. By 1938, having played cricket for 33 seasons, he had scored 45 centuries and eight double centuries. Altogether he had registered 25,000 runs and taken over 1000 wickets. He continued playing until circa 1951. Neale encouraged up and coming new players. An example of this was in 1948 when he, along with Jack Newman and Herb McGirr, after a Newman Shield match against Nelson, encouraged Arthur Cresswell to play for a major centre, leading him to become a foundation player for the Central Districts team.

He was also noted for his memory of cricket history and statistics.

== Public service ==
Neale assisted on a number of organisations: Nelson Provincial Chamber of Commerce Secretary (1920–1955), Nelson Automobile Association (secretary 1923–?), Nelson Progress League (1923–?), Municipal Association of New Zealand (president 1947–1948), Cawthorn Institute (board member representing the Nelson City Council 1943–?, Secretary 1946), National Patriotic Fund (1941–?), the New Zealand Road Safety Council (1947–?), and the Nelson Fire Board (13 years).

In 1930, Neale was appointed as a Justice of the Peace (JP).

In 1932, he, along with Arthur Rutland Edwards of Motueka and George E Manson of Stoke, was appointed to the Nelson Mortgagors' Liabilities Adjustment Commission under the Morgagors' Relief Amendment Act 1931 by the Minister of Justice, John Cobbe. With a change of Government and legislation all three were reappointed under the Mortgagees and Lessees Rehabilitation Act 1936 by the Attorney-General Rex Mason. The purpose of the commissions was to assist the Supreme Court in the adjustment of mortgages, a relief measure because of the Great Depression.

In 1942, in his capacity as Mayor of Nelson, he was appointed a District Controller of Civil Defence for Nelson Marlborough under the Emergency Reserve Corp Regulations by the 1st Labour Government's Minister of National Service, Bob Semple.

He was appointed an Officer of the Order of the British Empire in the 1946 New Year Honours, and received the Coronation Medal in 1953 for service to the community.

Neale, his son, and his grandson were all Secretaries of the Nelson Provincial Chamber of Commerce from 1920 to 1981. By 2008 the family had at least four generations of association with the Chamber of Commerce with his great granddaughter, Angela Hunter of Hunter Tourism Consultancy being a member. In recognition of this long association the Chamber made a special presentation to the family.

=== Nelson City Council ===
Neale was voted onto the Nelson City Council in 1925 and remained a councillor until 1947. For two periods, from 1933 to 1941, and from 1947 to 1950, he was Deputy Mayor of Nelson. In the intervening years (1941–1947), he was Mayor of Nelson.

=== Member of Parliament ===
New Zealand Parliament
Years	Term	Electorate	Party
1946–1949	28th	Nelson	National
1949–1951	29th	Nelson	National
1951–1954	30th	Nelson	National
1954–1957	31st	Nelson	National

In 1946, he stood as the National Party candidate for Nelson and was elected, replacing the legendary and recently deceased Harry Atmore, an MP who had held the electorate for 30 years.

In his maiden speech on 9 July 1947, Neale stated that he had entered Parliament with "a deep sense of responsibility and with some humility". He went on to say: "I will try to remember that the other fellow has a right to his own opinion" and quoted from Rudyard Kiplings poem If.

Under Sidney Holland, he was a Parliamentary Under-Secretary from 1950 to 1954 to the Minister of Industries and Commerce (Charles Bowden, followed by Jack Watts), but stepped down from this position due a prolonged periods of illness. Neale was apparently so ill that he was unable to campaign during the 1951 election and yet increased his majority. This prompted a telegram from Sir Clifton Webb, Attorney-General that stated that "apparently it was better to lie in bed than lie on the platform".

For a number of years he was the Chairman of Parliament's Public Accounts Committee.

In 1956 he together with Hon Sir Thomas Macdonald, Minister of External Affairs, and the member of Parliament for Ponsonby, Ritchie Macdonald, represented the New Zealand government at General Committee meeting of the Commonwealth Parliamentary Association in Jamaica.

=== Results for the Nelson Electorate by-election ===
Election	National	Labour	Majority
1946	52.10%	47.90%	585
1949	54.40%	45.60%	1,373
1951	58.80%	41.20%	2,831
1954	45.70%	41.00%	717

He represented the Nelson electorate from 1946 to 1957, when he retired.

=== Battle to save the Nelson Railway ===
Neale was a strong supporter of the Nelson railway line, and extending it to link with the South Island system. However this was against National policy, and in 1954 Minister of Railways Stan Goosman announced the suspension of the Nelson-Glenhope line, and a five-year programme of accelerated road development.

As a result of submissions from Neale, who was supported by the Nelson Progress League, the closure was deferred to allow time for the League to attempt to increase rail use. The League made some progress but insufficient to reach the levels required. The Government announced that the line would therefore be closed.

On 17 September 1955, the Nelson Progress League held a protest rally. Neale, as MP for Nelson, was one of the speakers. Also speaking at the protest were Jerry Skinner, MP for Buller, and Walter Nash, then Leader of the Labour Party. As a protest on 20 September 1955, Neale crossed the floor at Parliament on one occasion and voted with the opposition.

It may have been through this turbulent time that he forged a friendship with Mabel Howard, a famous Labour MP. Her bibliographer noted that he was one of a few gentlemanly National MPs who were close friends with her.

Neale gave his valedictory speech on 25 October 1957. His obituary later stated that Neale was "noted for his sincerity of address" (in Parliament).

He died after a period of illness in Nelson on 25 July 1960. On that same day the Nelson Progressive League was pressing the then Labour government to reinstate the Nelson Railway. That same day Neale died, the National Party was holding its conference. Members of the party passed a resolution of sympathy and condolence by standing in silence.

== Notes ==
New Zealand Parliament
Preceded by Harry Atmore	Member of Parliament for Nelson; 1946–1957	Succeeded by Stan Whitehead
Political offices
Preceded by George Page	Mayor of Nelson; 1941–1946	Succeeded by Joseph Harley
