= Collingwood Area School =

State composite school in New Zealand

- Te Kura o Aorere
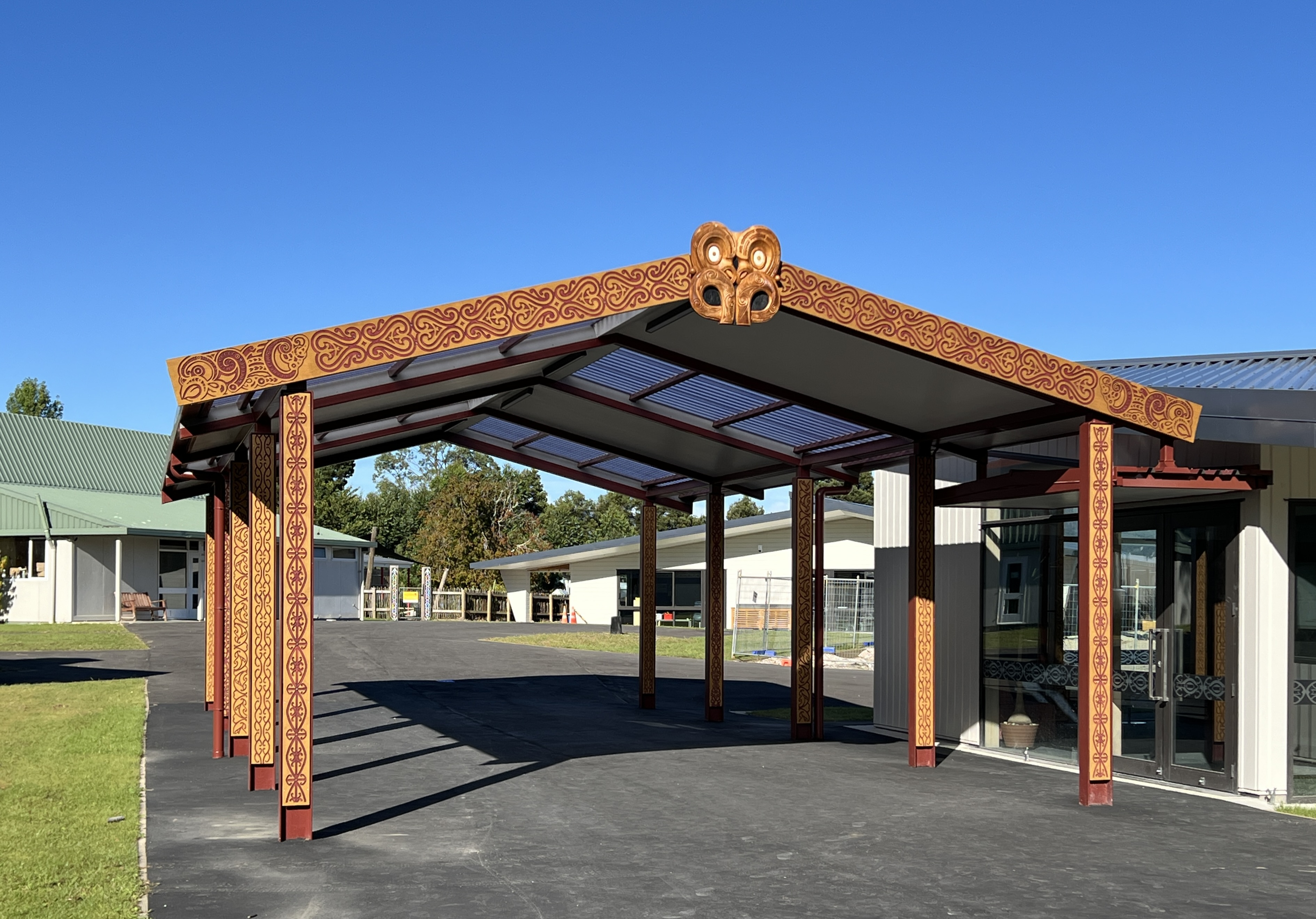
- Waharoa (entrance structure) of school

Location
- Lewis Street, Collingwood; 7073; New Zealand; 40°40′57″S 172°40′46″E

Information
- School type: Government-funded, area school
- Motto: Māori: Ka eke ngātahi tātou i te ngaru o te angitu (Together we ride the wave of lifelong success)
- Opened: 1859; 167 years ago
- Status: Open
- Ministry of Education Institution no.: 290
- Principal: Kate Staniford
- Gender: Co-educational
- Age range: Years 1–13
- Enrolment: 155 (July 2026)
- Language: English
- Colours: Gold and black
- Website: www.collingwood-area.school.nz

Collingwood Area School (Māori: Te Kura o Aorere) is an area school in the Golden Bay / Mohua town of Collingwood in New Zealand. The school dates back to 1859, when it was founded as Collingwood School. It was known as Collingwood District High School from 1937 to 1978.

== History ==
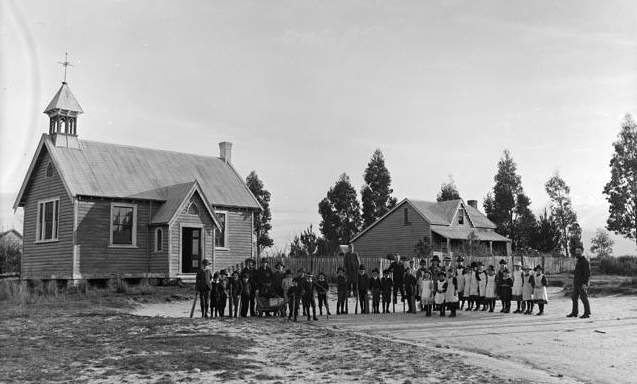
The second Collingwood School building in 1889

A few months after the beginning of the 1856 gold rush in Collingwood, parents were already petitioning the Nelson Board of Education for a school to be set up. Collingwood was established as a school district in 1858, and the school was established in 1859 as Collingwood School, at a cost of £150; the head of the school, John Edward Neame, was on a salary of £108, with an assistant mistress on a salary of £24. The school building on Lewis Street was near the site of the present school; the decayed 1859 schoolhouse was replaced in 1880 by a building with an ornamental belfry and large porch.

In 1936, it expanded to include a class for secondary students, with an initial roll of 12, and the following year it became a district high school. In 1978, it became an area school, and undertook a major reconstruction with many new buildings, including a new primary classroom and administration block, at a cost of $265,750. Area schools, found in rural areas of New Zealand, educate years 1 to 13, with teachers able to work with any children in that range.

The school has a roll of 155 as of July 2026. In 2023, the school undertook a $9 million upgrade that included 10 new classrooms, a library, and technology, science and administration buildings, as well as a revamp of the school gym.

== School bell ==
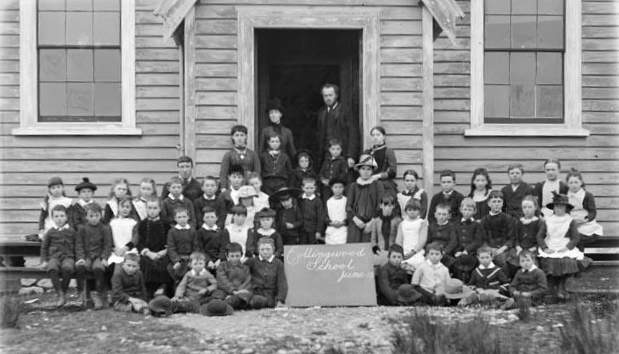
School photo, 1889

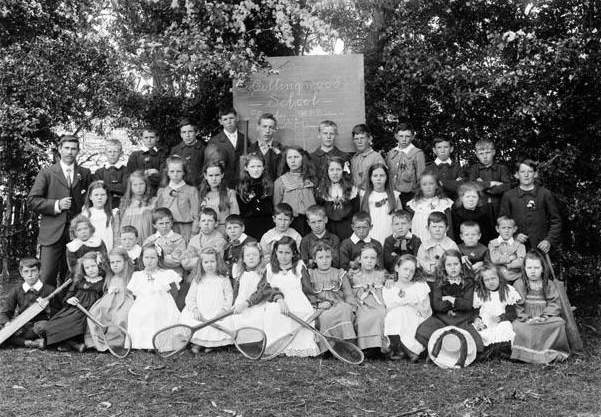
School photo, 1904

The school's original bell was lost in the 1920s. In 1964, Rear Admiral Richard Washbourn, who had close family connections with Golden Bay, bought the bell of HMS Chevron from the Rosyth Dockyard for £8, and donated it to the school the following year. Washbourn wrote at the time that "Collingwood is a very remote little settlement one hundred miles from the nearest town and it will do the young good to have some reminder of the world outside.....even if that reminder only serves the mundane purpose of calling them to their studies".

== Notable staff ==
- Philip Woollaston – politician

=== Principals ===
The following is an incomplete list of headmasters and principals of Collingwood School, Collingwood District High School and Collingwood Area School.

No.	Name	Term
1	John Neame	1859–1861
	Francis O'Sullivan	1869–1875
	Ezra Brook Dixon	1875–1876
	Edward Canavan	fl. 1878
	Joseph William Humphreys	fl. 1880
	Mr Anderson	fl. 1885
	Alfred Thomas White	1898–1903
	Herbert Basil Score Sanders	1904–1911
	Hollis Hill	?–1934
	Arthur Osborne Stanley	1936–1939
	George Henry Ralph	1939–1948
	James A. Hook	1948–?
	John Garner	2002–2014
	Janelle Mckenzie	2014–2016
	Caroline Gray	2016–2018
	Hugh Gully	2019–2024
	Kate Staniford	2025–present
