= Peter Malone (mayor) =

Former Mayor of Nelson

Peter Malone CNZM OBE

24th Mayor of Nelson
- In office 1980–1992
- Preceded by: Roy McLennan
- Succeeded by: Philip Woollaston

Personal details
- Born: Peter Heywood Malone; 22 March 1928 Dunedin, New Zealand
- Died: 5 March 2006 (aged 77) Nelson, New Zealand
- Relations: Robert Trimble (great-grandfather); Abel Heywood (great-great-grandfather); William Malone (great-uncle); Liam Malone (grandson); Colleen Malone (cousin)
- Education: University of Sydney
- Profession: Veterinary surgeon

Peter Heywood Malone CNZM OBE (22 March 1928 – 5 March 2006) was a New Zealand veterinary surgeon and politician. He served as Mayor of Nelson from 1980 to 1992.

== Early life and family ==
Malone was born in Dunedin on 22 March 1928. He was the son of Robert Austin Malone and Helen Fergusson (née Minnis). He was married twice: first to Cynthia Bevis Jones; and in 1971 to Patricia Joan Knapp. He had five sons from his first marriage.

Malone was the great-grandson of Robert Trimble, a 19th-century member of the New Zealand Parliament, and the great-great-grandson of Abel Heywood, who served as two separate terms as mayor of Manchester in the 1860s and 1870s. Malone was also the great-nephew of Lieutenant Colonel William George Malone, who commanded the Wellington Infantry Battalion at Gallipoli. The athlete, Liam Malone, is Peter Malone's grandson.

Malone was educated at Wellington College from 1941 to 1944, Victoria University College (1946–1947), the University of Otago (1948) and the University of Sydney. He graduated with a Bachelor of Veterinary Science.

== Veterinarian ==
From 1952 to 1957 Malone worked as a veterinary surgeon in Brightwater near Nelson, and from 1957 to 1986 in Nelson. He also served on the New Zealand Hydatids Council and took particular interest in bovine tuberculosis.

Malone owned a 1947 Auster JB1 Aiglet, ZK-BWH, and used it for access to the remotest parts of the Nelson District in what was probably New Zealand's first "flying vet" service.

Malone had initially leased the Auster from the Nelson Aero Club, but about 1960 bought it used it for the next 21 years. In 1981, when Mayor of Nelson, Malone donated the aircraft to the RNZAF Museum at Wigram.

== Politics ==
Malone was a National Party supporter and unsuccessfully stood in the 1963 and 1978 general elections and 1976 by-election as the National Party Nelson electorate candidate. He also stood in 1975 for the Tasman electorate.

In 1974 Malone was elected to the Nelson City Council and served as a Councillor from 1974 to 1980 and then as Mayor from 1980 to 1992.

Malone was appointed a justice of the peace in 1980, an Officer of the Order of the British Empire, for services to the veterinary profession, in the 1982 Queen's Birthday Honours, and a Companion of the New Zealand Order of Merit, for services to local government and the community, in the 2000 New Year Honours.

He was also Chair of the Network Tasman Trust from 1995 until 2005 when he was forced to quit after being diagnosed with a rare nerve disorder, trigeminal neuralgia. This is a condition where severe pain can be triggered by such simple actions as brushing your teeth or touching your face, or even a slight breeze. Malone was quoted as saying: "At its worst even trying to talk or eat is extremely painful, and the drugs to try and knock that so you can live reasonably leave you drugged, as it were."

== Sport and death ==
Malone played representative hockey and badminton. He died at Nelson on 5 March 2006.

Political offices
Preceded by Roy McLennan	Mayor of Nelson; 1980–1992	Succeeded by Philip Woollaston
