= Philip Woollaston =

New Zealand politician

The Honourable Philip Woollaston

25th Mayor of Nelson
- In office 1992–1998
- Preceded by: Peter Malone
- Succeeded by: Paul Matheson

4th Minister of Local Government
- In office 9 February 1990 – 2 November 1990
- Prime Minister: Geoffrey Palmer; Mike Moore
- Preceded by: Michael Bassett
- Succeeded by: Warren Cooper

3rd Minister of Conservation
- In office 30 January 1989 – 2 November 1990
- Prime Minister: David Lange; Geoffrey Palmer; Mike Moore
- Preceded by: Helen Clark
- Succeeded by: Denis Marshall

Member of the New Zealand Parliament for Nelson
- In office 1981–1990
- Preceded by: Mel Courtney
- Succeeded by: John Blincoe

Personal details
- Born: Philip Tosswill Edmond Woollaston; 17 August 1944 (age 82) Motueka, New Zealand
- Party: Labour
- Relations: Toss Woollaston (father); Anna Caselberg (sister); John Caselberg (brother-in-law)
- Education: University of Canterbury

Philip Tosswill Edmond Woollaston (born 17 August 1944) is a former New Zealand Labour Party politician. He was Member of Parliament for Nelson from 1981 to 1990 and Mayor of Nelson from 1992 to 1998.

== Early life and family ==
Woollaston was born in Motueka to New Zealand artist Sir Mountford Tosswill Woollaston and Edith Winifred Alexander. He is married with two children.

Woollaston attended Greymouth Main Primary School and Cobden Primary School. While his parents were overseas he attended St Andrew's College in Christchurch (1958–62) as a boarder.

He graduated from the University of Canterbury with a Bachelor of Science in physics (1971) and Christchurch Teachers' College with a Diploma in Teaching (1971).

== Teaching career ==
Woollaston taught at Linwood High School (1972–74), lectured at the University of Canterbury (1975), and taught at both Collingwood District High School (1976–77) and Collingwood Area School (1977–80) before embarking on a political career.

In 1974, Woollaston was awarded the Rutherford Trophy for Demonstrations in Physics by the New Zealand Institute of Physics, for his demonstration of linear dynamics.

== Political career ==
New Zealand Parliament
Years	Term	Electorate	Party
1981–1984	40th	Nelson	Labour
1984–1987	41st	Nelson	Labour
1987–1990	42nd	Nelson	Labour

Woollaston joined the New Zealand Labour Party in 1975. He was Secretary of the Labour Party Policy Council from 1982 to 1984.

He was a Golden Bay County Councillor—including chairman—and on the Nelson Regional Airport Authority from 1977 to 1980. Woollaston was also on the Nelson Bays United Council and No 11 District Roads Board from 1979 to 1980.

Woollaston stood for the Nelson electorate in 1981, defeating incumbent MP Mel Courtney. In 1983 he was appointed as Labour's spokesperson for Local Government by Labour leader David Lange.

During his time in Parliament he was Associate Minister for the Environment (1987–89), Associate Minister of Justice (1987–90), Minister assisting the Deputy Prime Minister (1988–90), Minister of Conservation (1989–90), and Minister of Local Government (1990). Woollaston was a junior Minister in the controversial Fourth Labour Governments of David Lange & Geoffrey Palmer but never sought at the time (through resignation or public opposition) to distance himself from the Rogernomics policies of that era.

As Associate Minister for the Environment Philip Woollaston helped broker the Montreal Protocol, working through the night in Montreal, Canada, to successfully draw together parties before the looming deadline, when Europe was largely hedging around the deal. The Montreal Protocol was the first global treaty to bring together a majority of nations over global environmental concerns, in this case being the use of chlorofluorocarbons (CFCs) as refrigerants and discovering that they were destroying the stratospheric ozone layer which prevents harmful ultraviolet light from entering the lower atmosphere.

In 1990 Woollaston retired from Parliament and was replaced as MP for Nelson by John Blincoe. On 6 December 1990, he was granted the title "The Honourable" for life, in recognition of his services as a member of the Executive Council.

In 1991 he became Policy Advisor to the executive director of the United Nations Environment Programme in Nairobi, Kenya for two years.

== Mayor ==
Following his return to New Zealand, Woollaston stood for and became Mayor of Nelson in 1992. Re-elected in 1995, he was defeated by Paul Matheson in 1998.

== Mahana (formerly Woollaston) Estates Winery in Receivership & Glenn Schaeffer ==
In 1993 Woollaston developed a small vineyard in the Waimea Plains near Nelson with his wife Chan. Originally intended as a retirement hobby, the winery grew into a full-time business when the Woollastons entered into a partnership with American couple, Glenn and (his former wife) Renee Schaeffer, purchasing an apple orchard at Mahana near Nelson. Originally the winery was called Woollaston Estates but in 2015 it changed its name to Mahana Estates.

Glenn Schaeffer made headlines in 2009 when the US company he co-founded and headed (Fontainebleau Resorts) filed for bankruptcy. It had been developing the US$2.9 billion Fontainebleau Las Vegas, a 68-storey 3889 room hotel, condominium and casino (now The Drew Las Vegas, which remains unfinished as of 2020).

Woollaston retired from his position as managing director of the winery in 2009. In July 2018, the Mahana Estates Winery was put up sale and in September it was put into receivership. In December 2018 the High Court of New Zealand found that Schaeffer had made false representations to Las Vegas investors that they were purchasing a share in the winery and vineyard when in fact he had never transferred his interest in the business to the limited partnership and had continued to deal with the assets as if they were his own. Schaeffer was ordered to repay NZ$3.3 million to the investors. In June 2020, Schaeffer's appeal to the Court of Appeal was dismissed.

== Sources ==
- Wilson, Jim (1985) [First published in 1913]. New Zealand Parliamentary Record, 1840–1984 (4th ed.). Wellington: V.R. Ward, Govt. Printer. OCLC 154283103.

New Zealand Parliament
Preceded by Mel Courtney	Member of Parliament for Nelson; 1981–1990	Succeeded by John Blincoe
Political offices
Preceded by Helen Clark	Minister of Conservation; 1989–1990	Succeeded by Denis Marshall
Preceded by Michael Bassett	Minister of Local Government; 1990	Succeeded by Warren Cooper
Preceded by Peter Malone	Mayor of Nelson; 1992–1998	Succeeded by Paul Matheson
