= Douglas Strawbridge =

Former Mayor of Nelson

21st Mayor of Nelson
- In office 1962–1968
- Preceded by: Stanley Russell
- Succeeded by: Trevor Horne

Personal details
- Born: Douglas Nelson Strawbridge; 21 October 1908 Nelson, New Zealand
- Died: 6 December 1979 (aged 71) Nelson, New Zealand
- Occupation: Building contractor

Douglas Nelson Strawbridge (21 October 1908 – 6 December 1979) served as Mayor of Nelson, New Zealand from 1962 to 1968. Strawbridge was born, the son of Charles James Strawbridge and Martha Annie Strawbridge. He attended Nelson College in 1923 and became a building contractor.

Strawbridge was elected Mayor of Nelson in 1962 and held the position to 1968.

He died at Nelson, and was buried at Marsden Valley Cemetery, Stoke.

Political offices
Preceded by Stanley Russell	Mayor of Nelson; 1962–1968	Succeeded by Trevor Horne
