= Michael Bassett =

New Zealand politician

The Honourable Michael Bassett CNZM QSO
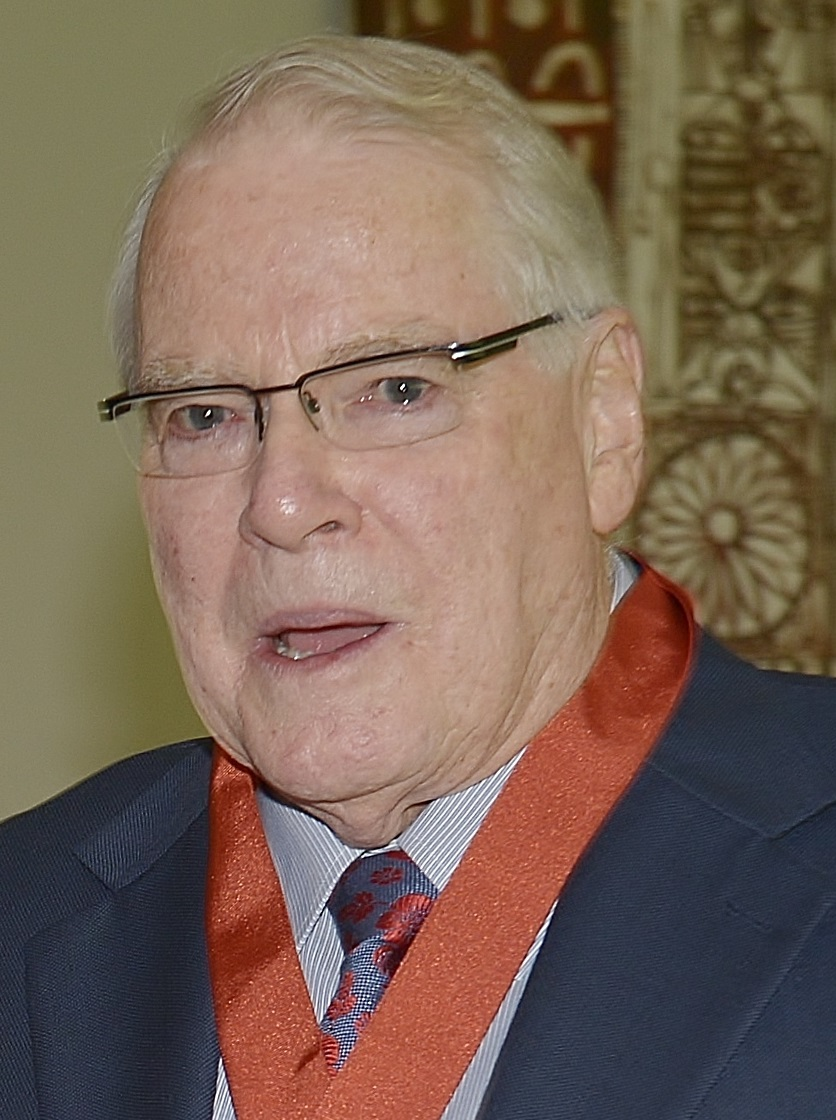
- Bassett in 2018

22nd Minister of Internal Affairs
- In office 24 August 1987 – 9 February 1990
- Prime Minister: David Lange; Geoffrey Palmer
- Preceded by: Peter Tapsell
- Succeeded by: Margaret Austin

3rd Minister for Arts and Culture
- In office 24 August 1987 – 9 February 1990
- Prime Minister: David Lange; Geoffrey Palmer
- Preceded by: Peter Tapsell
- Succeeded by: Margaret Austin

3rd Minister of Local Government
- In office 26 July 1984 – 9 February 1990
- Prime Minister: David Lange; Geoffrey Palmer
- Preceded by: Allan Highet
- Succeeded by: Philip Woollaston

27th Minister of Health
- In office 26 July 1984 – 24 August 1987
- Prime Minister: David Lange
- Preceded by: Aussie Malcolm
- Succeeded by: David Caygill

Member of the New Zealand Parliament for Te Atatu
- In office 25 November 1978 – 27 October 1990
- Succeeded by: Brian Neeson

Member of the New Zealand Parliament for Waitemata
- In office 25 November 1972 – 29 November 1975
- Preceded by: Frank Gill
- Succeeded by: Dail Jones

Personal details
- Born: Michael Edward Rainton Bassett; 28 August 1938 (age 88) Auckland, New Zealand
- Party: Labour
- Spouse: Judith Bassett
- Children: 2
- Relatives: David Lange (third cousin); Peter Lange (third cousin)
- Education: University of Auckland; Duke University
- Profession: Historian
- Website: michaelbassett.co.nz

Michael Edward Rainton Bassett CNZM QSO (born 28 August 1938) is a former Labour Party member of the New Zealand House of Representatives and cabinet minister in the reformist fourth Labour government. He is also a noted New Zealand historian, and has published a number of books on New Zealand politics, including biographies of Prime Ministers Peter Fraser, Gordon Coates and Joseph Ward.

== Life before politics ==
Bassett was born on 28 August 1938 in Auckland, the son of Clare Bassett (née Brown) and Edward Bassett, and educated at Owairaka School, Dilworth School, Mt Albert Grammar, and the University of Auckland. He completed BA and MA degrees in history at the University of Auckland before winning a fellowship to Duke University in the United States in 1961. He completed a PhD in American history there, completing a dissertation entitled The Socialist Party of America, 1912–1919: Years of Decline.

In 1964, Bassett returned to New Zealand and became a senior lecturer in history at the University of Auckland. During this time he was a member of the Princes Street Labour branch.

== Political career ==
New Zealand Parliament
Years	Term	Electorate	Party
1972–1975	37th	Waitemata	Labour
1978–1981	39th	Te Atatu	Labour
1981–1984	40th	Te Atatu	Labour
1984–1987	41st	Te Atatu	Labour
1987–1990	42nd	Te Atatu	Labour

Bassett stood unsuccessfully for the Labour Party in the 1966 election for North Shore and in the 1969 election for Waitemata.

In 1971 Bassett was elected to the Auckland City Council. In the following year, he was elected as a Labour MP for Waitemata in the 1972 election, and the Labour Party became the government for the first time since 1960. Following the death of Prime Minister Norman Kirk in 1974 the party (and Bassett) were defeated in the following (1975) election. In his account of the Third Labour Government, Bassett described it as one of "the most active and socially responsible governments of the twentieth century." He distinguished himself as one of the better performing backbenchers in the government and during its term he assisted Henry May, the Minister of Local Government, in local body amalgamation. Following his defeat, Bassett was asked about the Labour candidacy for the Nelson by-election, which took place only months afterwards, but he ruled it out saying he was not interested in Nelson and "nor would Nelson be interested in me."

Bassett was elected to the Te Atatu electorate in the 1978 election, holding the seat until 1990. Soon after returning to Parliament, he was appointed Shadow Minister of Internal Affairs, Local Government and Sport & Recreation. In a reshuffle in March 1981 he was instead appointed Shadow Minister for Health. Bassett was vocally critical of party president Jim Anderton (particularly after Anderton was ejected from the head office of Air New Zealand during an industrial dispute) and declared he would challenge him for the presidency of the party. An open conflict drew the ire of others in the party and eventually Bassett withdrew his candidacy. He was still subsequently dumped from the shadow cabinet in February 1982.

In 1984, an electoral landslide in favour of Labour resulted in New Zealand's fourth Labour government (in office: 1984–1990). David Lange appointed Bassett Minister of Health and Minister of Local Government. As Minister of Local Government he imposed electoral reforms on councils to use a ward system for local electoral districts, replacing the more commonplace at large system. The government enacted a major programme of economic and social reform, the economic arm of which became known as Rogernomics. Major social reforms included the decriminalisation of homosexuality in the Homosexual Law Reform Act 1986. Bassett wholeheartedly supported the social reforms.

After winning a second term, Bassett retained only the Local Government portfolio but was appointed Minister of Internal Affairs, Civil Defence and Arts and Culture in 1987. Bassett also served as chairman of the New Zealand Lottery Grants Board and of the 1990 Commission, tasked with the commemoration of the 150th anniversary of the signing of the Treaty of Waitangi. In his capacity as Minister of Internal Affairs he also helped to reorganise Waitangi Day celebrations and to encourage them around New Zealand.

When Lange's replacement as Prime Minister Geoffrey Palmer held a complete reelection of cabinet in early 1990 all members of the cabinet not contesting the next election (such as Bassett) were discouraged from standing. After leaving the cabinet he was selected to represent the New Zealand government at the Commonwealth Parliamentary Association held in Zimbabwe in September 1990.

When the government and party schismed over issues of economic reform, Bassett took the side of finance minister Roger Douglas, the main architect of the reforms. In 1990, Labour was defeated in another landslide election. Bassett did not contest the 1990 election, and retired from active politics.

He continued occasionally to be involved at an advisory level, for example unofficially advising Don Brash during Brash's term (2003–2006) as National Party leader.

== Career after politics ==
Bassett resumed his academic career, publishing several books on New Zealand political history, and contributing to the Dictionary of New Zealand Biography and the British Dictionary of National Biography. He worked for two years with New Zealand's Expo team in the run up to the Seville Expo '92. He was a professor of history at the University of Western Ontario on and off from 1992 to 1996, taught at the University of Auckland Medical School from 1997 to 2000, and was a Fulbright Professor of New Zealand Studies at Georgetown University, Washington, D.C.

From 1994 to 2004 Bassett was a member of the Waitangi Tribunal, which investigates breaches of the Treaty of Waitangi.

He was a columnist for The Dominion Post in Wellington (until late 2006) and The Press in Christchurch.

An article by Bassett in The Northland Age was withdrawn by NZME in March 2021 after Bassett criticised the "bizarre craze" of New Zealand adopting Māori language words and phrases, such as using Aotearoa to refer to the country.

== Scholarship ==
In his article The Essentials of Successful Political Leadership in Twentieth Century New Zealand Politics, Bassett outlined the factors he thought were required for a Prime Minister to be successful. These factors include robust health, high energy levels, a good temperament, intelligence, a willingness to take the right, as opposed to the politically expedient, decision, a modicum of luck, a supportive spouse and charisma.

== Personal life ==
In 1964, Bassett married Judith Petrie, who went on to become a historian at the University of Auckland and a member of the Auckland Regional Council. She had also been a member of the Auckland Hospital Board. The couple had two children.

Bassett is a third cousin of late Prime Minister David Lange. Bassett had suggested that Lange should stand on the Labour ticket for the Auckland City Council in 1974. The council was dominated by conservative interests and the only Labour candidates elected were Jim Anderton and Catherine Tizard; Lange was "halfway down the field .... which was better than I expected". Lange's father, who was a doctor, had delivered Bassett. Lange wrote (presumably jokingly referring to Bassett's appointment to Cabinet and their later disagreements): "My father had delivered him, and it became plain in later days that he must have dropped him ...."

== Honours ==
Bassett was awarded the New Zealand 1990 Commemoration Medal. In the 1992 Queen's Birthday Honours, Bassett was appointed a Companion of the Queen's Service Order for public services. He was made a Companion of the New Zealand Order of Merit, for services as an historian, in the 2018 New Year Honours.

== Works ==
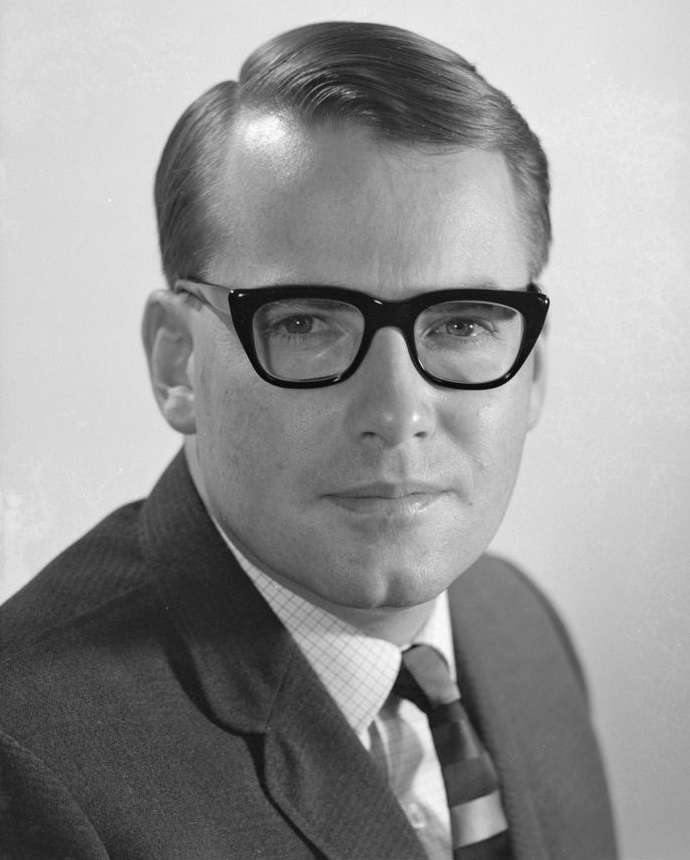
Bassett in 1969

- Bassett, Michael, The Socialist Party of America, 1912–1919: Years of Decline. PhD dissertation. Duke University. (1964)
- Bassett, Michael, Confrontation '51: the 1951 Waterfront Dispute (1972)
- Bassett, Michael, The Third Labour Government (1976) ISBN 0-908564-35-X
- Bassett, Michael (1982). Three Party Politics in New Zealand 1911–1931. Auckland: Historical Publications.
- Bassett, Michael, Sir Joseph Ward (1993);
- Bassett, Michael (1995). Coates of Kaipara.
- Bassett, Michael, The Mother of All Departments: A History of the Department of Internal Affairs (1997)
- Bassett, Michael, The State in New Zealand 1840–1984: Socialism Without Doctrines? (1998)
- Bassett, Michael and King, Michael, Tomorrow Comes the Song: A life of Peter Fraser (2001)
- Bassett and Bassett, Judith, Roderick Deane: His Life & Times (2006)
- Bassett, Michael and Goldsmith, Paul, The Myers (2007)
- Bassett, Michael, Working with David (2008)
- Bassett, Michael and Goldsmith, Paul, Puketutu and its People (2008)
- Bassett, Michael, City of Sails: The History of Auckland City Council, 1989–2010 (2013)
- Bassett, Michael and Bassett, Judith, "The Next Vintage: The Babich Family and 100 Years of New Zealamd Wine", (2015"
- Bassett, Michael, "New Zealand's Prime Ministers: From Dick Seddon to John Key", (2017)
- Bassett, Michael. "Airey, Willis Thomas Goodwin". Dictionary of New Zealand Biography. Ministry for Culture and Heritage.
- Bassett, Michael. "Coates, Joseph Gordon". Dictionary of New Zealand Biography. Ministry for Culture and Heritage.
- Bassett, Michael. "Kirk, Norman Eric". Dictionary of New Zealand Biography. Ministry for Culture and Heritage.
- Bassett, Michael. "Ward, Joseph George". Dictionary of New Zealand Biography. Ministry for Culture and Heritage.

== Notes ==
New Zealand Parliament
Preceded by Frank Gill	Member of Parliament for Waitemata; 1972–1975	Succeeded by Dail Jones
New constituency	Member of Parliament for Te Atatu; 1978–1990	Succeeded by Brian Neeson
Political offices
Preceded by Peter Tapsell	Minister of Internal Affairs; 1987–1990	Succeeded by Margaret Austin
Preceded by Peter Tapsell	Minister for Arts and Culture; 1987–1990	Succeeded by Margaret Austin
Preceded by Allan Highet	Minister of Local Government; 1984–1990	Succeeded by Philip Woollaston
Preceded by Aussie Malcolm	Minister of Health; 1984–1987	Succeeded by David Caygill
