= Roy McLennan =

New Zealand politician

Roy McLennan MBE

23rd Mayor of Nelson
- In office 1971–1980
- Preceded by: Trevor Horne
- Succeeded by: Peter Malone

Personal details
- Born: Roy Alexander McLennan; 30 October 1924 Wellington, New Zealand
- Died: 18 September 2013 (aged 88) Nelson, New Zealand
- Spouse: Noeline Clark (m. 1948)

Roy Alexander McLennan MBE (30 October 1924 – 18 September 2013) was a New Zealand local-body politician. He served as mayor of Nelson from 1971 to 1980.

== Early life and family ==
Born in Wellington in 1924, McLennan was the son of A. J. McLennan. He was educated at Rongotai College and, from 1940 to 1941, Nelson College. During World War II he joined the Royal New Zealand Navy and served in the Royal Navy Fleet Air Arm as a Cadet (1943–45).

McLennan married Noelene Clark in 1948 and had two sons and a daughter. From 1950 to 1970 he was a civil engineering contractor and Director of R A McLennan Ltd, McLennan's Transport Ltd, Flaxmere Quarries, Concrete Metal Ltd, Amalgamated Contractors Ltd, and Bulk Bitumen Ltd.

From 1964 to 1970 he was National Secretary of the New Zealand Contractors Federation and from 1966 to 1971 the Scouts Association.

== Political career ==
In 1970 he was elected to the Nelson City Council, becoming mayor from 1971 to 1980. He was on the Nelson Harbour Board from 1971 to 1974. He stood in the 1989 Nelson-Marlborough Regional Council election in the Nelson constituency for a seat on the Nelson-Marlborough Regional Council, but was unsuccessful.

During his term as mayor a reclamation was proposed for residential purposes at Nelson Haven. There was strong public opposition and he decided at a public meeting that the proposal should not go ahead. He did not have Council support at the time for his decision and the matter took some time to be finally resolved in the objectors' favour.

In the 1993 New Year Honours, McLennan was appointed a Member of the Order of the British Empire, for services to local-body and community affairs.

In 2008, McLennan cut the cake with a sword in celebration of Nelson's 150th anniversary of becoming a city. He died at Nelson in 2013, and was buried in Marsden Valley Cemetery.

Political offices
| Preceded by Trevor Horne | Mayor of Nelson; 1971–1980 | Succeeded by Peter Malone |
