= Mayor of Nelson, New Zealand =

Mayor of Nelson
- Coat of arms of the City of Nelson

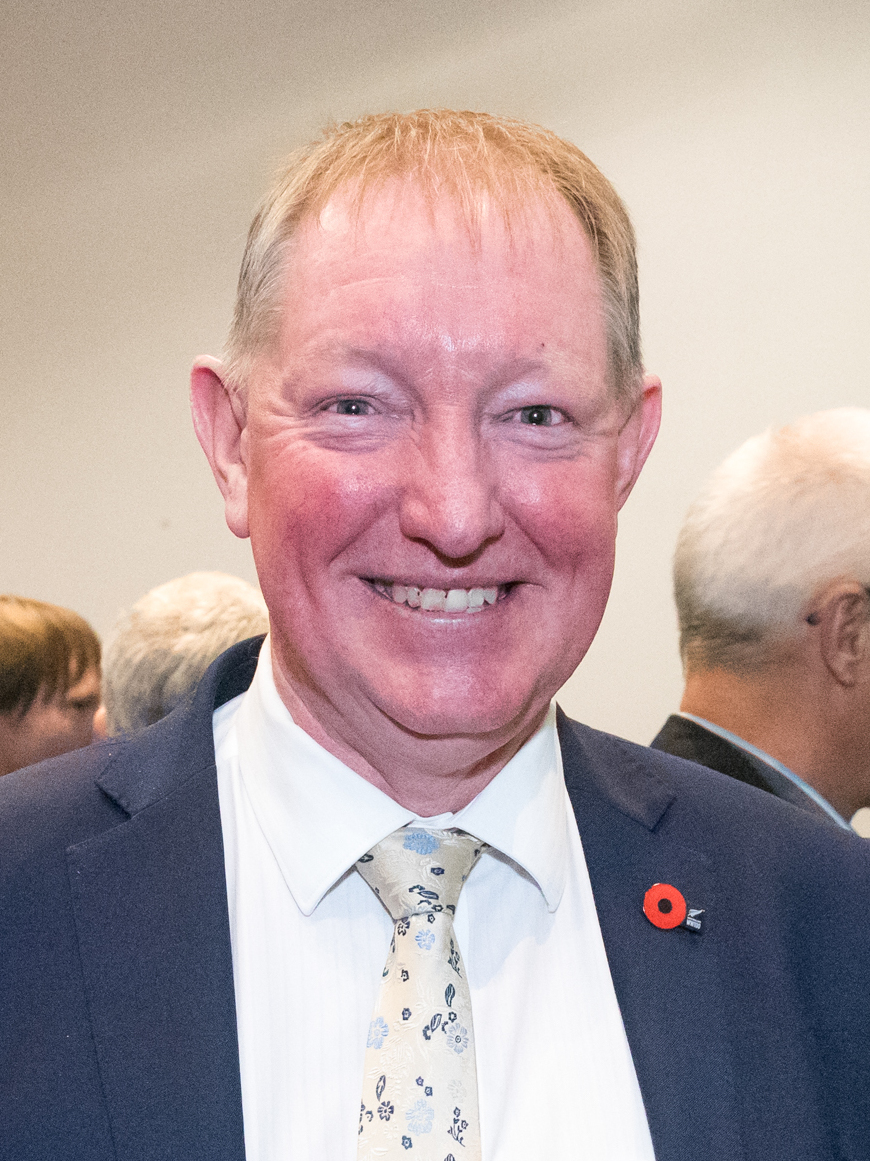
- Incumbent; Nick Smith since 2022
- Style: His/Her Worship
- Seat: Civic House, 110 Trafalgar Street, Nelson
- Term length: Three years
- Inaugural holder: Joseph Dodson
- Formation: 1874
- Deputy: Pete Rainey
- Salary: $149,909
- Website: Official website

The mayor of Nelson is the head of the municipal government of Nelson, New Zealand, and presides over the Nelson City Council. The mayor is directly elected using a single transferable vote electoral system. The current mayor is Nick Smith, who has been serving since 2022.

== History ==
=== 1874–1899 ===
Joseph Dodson was elected as the first mayor of Nelson on 1 May 1874 by the city councillors under the Municipal Corporations Act 1867. He was unanimously elected to the position. Dodson was a former member of the Nelson Board of Works. Councillor Fell noted that Dodson had taken great interest in the welfare of Nelson and was an upright gentleman with integrity.

The new council came into immediate conflict with the provincial government over finances. Nelson went bankrupt, the mayor resigned on 8 January 1875, and so did most of the councillors. A special meeting of the remaining Councillors was held on 12 January 1875 to appoint a new mayor but no one was forthcoming. A public meeting was held on the Friday to determine the wishes of the ratepayers.

Despite the meeting it was not until 26 February 1875 that a new mayor, Joseph Levien was appointed. Levien is credited with having set systems in place and employed capable staff that the financial crisis was able to be overcome. Levien died after only a short time in office on 7 June 1876.

Edward Everett was the third mayor. He was elected unopposed on 16 June 1876 and resigned on 1 September 1877 in order to travel to England. William Reid Waters was appointed by the councillors to fill the vacancy left by Everett. Waters was mayor until 19 December 1877 when Joseph Dodson was elected for a second time in his place.

When Dodson retired on 22 November 1881 Everett was elected mayor for a second term. Everett was mayor until 1882.

Charles Fell was mayor for five years until 1887. His second wife was a daughter of the Arthur Atkinson. Fell was a painter.

John Sharp succeeded Fell. Sharp had previously represented the City of Nelson electorate in Parliament.

Francis Trask was mayor for nine years (1890–1899). During his tenure, Rocks Road (now part of State Highway 6) was built along the coast, and Queens Gardens were established.

=== 1899–1998 ===
Trask was succeeded by Joseph Auty Harley, who was installed on 20 December 1899. Harley was succeeded by Henry Baigent, who was mayor in 1901–1904 and again in 1905–1906.

Jesse Piper was mayor in 1904–1905. He lost the mayoralty in 1905 to Baigent, but succeeded again in 1906 over the candidate put forward by Baigent. In the 1910 election Piper stood against Thomas Pettit and lost by 768 votes to 969.

Thomas Field was mayor from 1911 to 1913. From the following year, he was MP for Nelson for one term.

William Lock replaced Thomas Field as mayor after a fairly terse campaign against William Snodgrass in 1913. The following year he won again with only a 5-vote majority, but lost in 1915 to Charles Harley. Harley did not stand in 1917 and Snodgrass was elected.

Lock had continued to campaign for the mayoralty and was re-elected in 1921, ousting Snodgrass. Lock remained mayor until 1927 when Walter Moffatt came to power. Moffat retired in 1935 due to ill health and George Page was elected in his place. In the early 1940s, Page suffered from a prolonged period of ill health and was replaced by Edgar Neale, the deputy mayor, in 1941.

Edgar Neale was mayor from 1941 to 1947. He resigned after he became the Member of Parliament for Nelson.

Joseph Auty Harley was mayor from 1947 to 1956. He was succeeded by Stanley Russell. Russell was mayor from 1956 to 1962.

Douglas Strawbridge then served as mayor from 1962 to 1968. He was succeeded by Trevor Horne who served for one term from 1968 to 1971, and two subsequent terms as Deputy Mayor from 1974 to 1980.

Civil engineering contractor and former National Secretary of the New Zealand Contractors Federation Roy McLennan became mayor from 1971 to 1980.

McLennan was followed by Peter Malone who had unsuccessfully stood as the National Party candidate for the Nelson electorate in 1963, 1976 and 1978 and in the Tasman electorate in 1975. He served under McLennan as a councillor from 1974 to 1980 and then served four terms as mayor from 1980 to 1992.

Former Labour Party Member of Parliament for Nelson Philip Woollaston then served as mayor from 1992 to 1998.

=== 1998 to present ===
Paul Matheson successfully beat Woollaston on his second attempt in 1998, having lost to him in 1992. He served 3 terms as mayor, and later re-stood as a Councillor and served for three terms from 2010 to 2019 including two as deputy mayor under Rachel Reese.

Matheson was succeeded by former Richmond Borough Council and inaugural Tasman District Council mayor Kerry Marshall who served for one term from 2007 to 2010.Aldo Miccio won the 2010 mayoralty, with the incumbent getting third place. Rachel Reese won the 2013 mayoralty, becoming Nelson’s first woman mayor. Two-term councillor Reese had been Deputy Mayor for Kerry Marshall. Her deputy mayor from 2013 to 2019 was former Mayor Paul Matheson. In 2019, Reese appointed Judene Edgar as deputy mayor, the first time Nelson had a woman mayor and deputy mayor. Edgar, a first-term Nelson City councillor had previously been a three-term councillor for neighbouring Tasman District Council.

== Lists of office holders ==
=== List of mayors ===
The list below shows all mayors of Nelson since the first Nelson City Council meeting in April 1874.

	Name	Portrait	Term	Notes
1	Joseph Dodson		1874–1875	
2	Joseph Levien		1875–1876	
3	Edward Everett		1876–1877	
4	William Waters		1877	
	Joseph Dodson		1877–1881	2nd period
	Edward Everett		1881–1882	2nd period
5	Charles Yates Fell		1882–1887	
6	John Sharp		1887–1890	
7	Francis Trask		1890–1899	
8	Joseph Auty Harley		1899–1901	
9	Henry Baigent		1901–1904	
10	Jesse Piper		1904–1905	
	Henry Baigent		1905–1906	2nd period
	Jesse Piper		1906–1910	2nd period
11	Thomas Pettit		1910–1911	
12	Thomas Field		1911–1913	
13	William Lock		1913–1915	
14	Charles Harley		1915–1917	
15	William Snodgrass		1917–1921	
	William Lock		1921–1927	2nd period
16	Walter Moffatt		1927–1935	
17	George Page		1935–1941	
18	Edgar Neale		1941–1947	
19	Joseph Auty Harley		1947–1956	
20	Stanley Russell		1956–1962	
21	Douglas Strawbridge		1962–1968	
22	Trevor Horne		1968–1971	
23	Roy McLennan		1971–1980	
24	Peter Malone		1980–1992	
25	Philip Woollaston		1992–1998	
26	Paul Matheson		1998–2007	
27	Kerry Marshall		2007–2010	
28	Aldo Miccio		2010–2013	
29	Rachel Reese		2013–2022	
30	Nick Smith		2022–present	

=== List of deputy mayors ===
Name	Term	Mayor
Thomas Field	1910	Pettit
Edgar Neale	1933–1941	Moffatt
Edgar Neale	1933–1941	Page
Joseph Auty Harley	1944–1947	Neale
Edgar Neale	1947–1950	Harley
Frederick John Lock	1950–1953	Harley
Robert Francis Stenhouse	1953–1956	Harley
Betsy Eyre	1959–1962	Russell
Stan Whitehead	1962–1965	Strawbridge
Betsy Eyre	1965–1971	Strawbridge
Betsy Eyre	1965–1971	Horne
Trevor Horne	1974–1980	McLennan
Pat Tindle	1980–1986	Malone
Darcy Blair	1986–1989	Malone
Seddon Marshall	1989–1992	Malone
Len Ardell	1992–1995	Woollaston
Tui France	1995–1998	Woollaston
Jo Raine	1998–2001	Matheson
Gail Collingwood	2001–2007	Matheson
Rachel Reese	2007–2010	Marshall
Alison Boswijk	2010–2013	Miccio
Paul Matheson	2013–2019	Reese
Judene Edgar	2019–2022	Reese
Rohan O'Neill-Stevens	2022–2025	Smith
Pete Rainey	2025–present	Smith
