= Betsy Eyre =

New Zealand teacher and politician

Betsy Robertson Eyre MBE (née Walter, 28 November 1911 – 17 January 1983) was a New Zealand teacher, community worker and local politician. She was born in Nelson, New Zealand, on 28 November 1911.

In the 1967 New Year Honours, Eyre was appointed a Member of the Order of the British Empire, for services to the community and local government.
