= 1989 New Zealand local government reforms =

Law in New Zealand

Map of territorial authorities after the 2010 Auckland Council amalgamation. Cities are in uppercase, others are districts. Regions are indicated with colours.

The 1989 New Zealand local government reform was the most significant reform of local government in New Zealand in over a century. Some 850 local bodies were amalgamated into 86 local authorities, on regional and territorial levels. The new authorities were established on 1 November, following the election of members on 14 October 1989.

== Background ==
The previous major local government reform was the replacement of provincial government with elected borough and county councils at the end of 1876. The Counties Act 1876 created 63 counties out of the rural parts of the provinces.

Over subsequent decades, many new bodies were set up, some of them multi-purpose, and others single-purpose, such as harbour boards. The Local Government Act 1974 consolidated the law relating to territorial local authorities, removing the distinction between urban authorities (boroughs and towns) and rural authorities (counties). It enabled the establishment of regional councils, but these were not established until the 1989 reform.

== History ==
The Labour Party had reform of local government as one of its policies for the 1984 election, but did not give much detail; the proposals were developed during the first term of the Fourth Labour Government after the party won the election. Michael Bassett was Minister of Local Government and appointed a Local Government Commission, which was chaired by Brian Elwood from 1 April 1985 to 1 November 1992. The government gave the commission a guarantee that their findings would be treated as binding. The resulting local government reform was undertaken along the lines of marketisation, and was done in conjunction with neoliberal economic reforms known as Rogernomics. Some 850 entities were amalgamated into 86 local authorities on regional and territorial levels. Of the 850 entities, 249 were municipalities, and the remainder harbour boards, catchment boards, and drainage boards. The new authorities came into being on 1 November 1989, with the local politicians having been elected on 14 October. Brian Rudman, a journalist and editorial writer for The New Zealand Herald, called the reforms "revolutionary".

== Results of the reform ==
=== Regional authorities ===
New Zealand was divided into 14 regions, of which 13 were regional authorities, and the remaining one, Gisborne, was a unitary authority. Unitary authorities in New Zealand are district (or city) authorities that also fulfil the function of a regional authority.

	Region	Regional council	Council seat	Island
Unitary authorities
1	Gisborne	Gisborne District Council	Gisborne	North
Regional authorities
1	Northland	Northland Regional Council	Whangārei	North
2	Auckland	Auckland Regional Council	Auckland	North
3	Waikato	Waikato Regional Council	Hamilton	North
4	Bay of Plenty	Bay of Plenty Regional Council	Whakatane	North
5	Hawke's Bay	Hawke's Bay Regional Council	Napier	North
6	Taranaki	Taranaki Regional Council	Stratford	North
7	Manawatū-Whanganui	Horizons Regional Council	Palmerston North	North
8	Wellington	Greater Wellington Regional Council	Wellington	North
9	Nelson-Marlborough	Nelson-Marlborough Regional Council	Blenheim	South
10	West Coast	West Coast Regional Council	Greymouth	South
11	Canterbury	Canterbury Regional Council	Christchurch	South
12	Otago	Otago Regional Council	Dunedin	South
13	Southland	Southland Regional Council	Invercargill	South

=== Territorial authorities ===
At a territorial level, district and city authorities were created. The area of a district may belong to more than one regional authority.

	Name	Seat	Region(s)	Island
1	Far North District	Kaikohe	Northland	North
2	Whangarei District	Whangārei	Northland	North
3	Kaipara District	Dargaville	Northland	North
4	Rodney District	Orewa	Auckland	North
5	Auckland City	Auckland	Auckland	North
6	North Shore City	Takapuna	Auckland	North
7	Waitakere City	Henderson	Auckland	North
8	Manukau City	Manukau	Auckland	North
9	Papakura District	Papakura	Auckland	North
10	Franklin District	Pukekohe	Waikato (60.18%); Auckland (39.82%)	North
11	Thames-Coromandel District	Thames	Waikato	North
12	Hauraki District	Paeroa	Waikato	North
13	Waikato District	Ngāruawāhia	Waikato	North
14	Matamata-Piako District	Te Aroha	Waikato	North
15	Hamilton City	Hamilton	Waikato	North
16	Waipa District	Te Awamutu	Waikato	North
17	South Waikato District	Tokoroa	Waikato	North
18	Otorohanga District	Otorohanga	Waikato	North
19	Waitomo District	Te Kūiti	Waikato (94.87%); Manawatū-Whanganui (5.13%)	North
20	Taupō District	Taupō	Waikato (73.74%); Bay of Plenty (14.31%); Hawke's Bay (11.26%); Manawatū-Whanganui (0.69%)	North
21	Western Bay of Plenty District	Greerton, Tauranga City	Bay of Plenty	North
22	Tauranga District	Tauranga	Bay of Plenty	North
23	Opotiki District	Opotiki	Bay of Plenty	North
24	Whakatane District	Whakatane	Bay of Plenty	North
25	Rotorua District	Rotorua	Bay of Plenty (61.52%); Waikato (38.48%)	North
26	Kawerau District	Kawerau	Bay of Plenty	North
27	Gisborne District	Gisborne	Gisborne (unitary authority)	North
28	Wairoa District	Wairoa	Hawke's Bay	North
29	Hastings District	Hastings	Hawke's Bay	North
30	Napier City	Napier	Hawke's Bay	North
31	Central Hawke's Bay District	Waipawa	Hawke's Bay	North
32	New Plymouth District	New Plymouth	Taranaki	North
33	Stratford District	Stratford	Taranaki (68.13%); Manawatū-Whanganui (31.87%)	North
34	South Taranaki District	Hawera	Taranaki	North
35	Ruapehu District	Taumarunui	Manawatū-Whanganui	North
36	Rangitikei District	Marton	Manawatū-Whanganui (86.37%); Hawke's Bay (13.63%)	North
37	Wanganui District	Wanganui	Manawatū-Whanganui	North
38	Manawatū District	Feilding	Manawatū-Whanganui	North
39	Palmerston North City	Palmerston North	Manawatū-Whanganui	North
40	Tararua District	Dannevirke	Manawatū-Whanganui (98.42%); Wellington (1.58%)	North
41	Horowhenua District	Levin	Manawatū-Whanganui	North
42	Masterton District	Masterton	Wellington	North
43	Kāpiti Coast District	Paraparaumu	Wellington	North
44	Carterton District	Carterton	Wellington	North
45	South Wairarapa District	Martinborough	Wellington	North
46	Upper Hutt City	Upper Hutt	Wellington	North
47	Porirua City	Porirua	Wellington	North
48	Hutt City	Lower Hutt	Wellington	North
49	Wellington City	Wellington	Wellington	North
50	Tasman District	Richmond	Nelson-Marlborough	South
51	Nelson City	Nelson	Nelson-Marlborough	South
52	Marlborough District	Blenheim	Nelson-Marlborough	South
53	Kaikoura District	Kaikoura	Nelson-Marlborough	South
54	Buller District	Westport	West Coast	South
55	Grey District	Greymouth	West Coast	South
56	Westland District	Hokitika	West Coast	South
57	Hurunui District	Amberley	Canterbury	South
58	Selwyn District	Rolleston	Canterbury	South
59	Waimakariri District	Rangiora	Canterbury	South
60	Christchurch City	Christchurch	Canterbury	South
61	Banks Peninsula	Lyttelton	Canterbury	South
62	Ashburton District	Ashburton	Canterbury	South
63	Mackenzie District	Fairlie	Canterbury	South
64	Timaru District	Timaru	Canterbury	South
65	Waimate District	Waimate	Canterbury	South
66	Waitaki District	Oamaru	Canterbury (59.61%); Otago (40.39%)	South
67	Queenstown-Lakes District	Queenstown	Otago	South
68	Central Otago District	Alexandra	Otago	South
69	Dunedin City	Dunedin	Otago	South
70	Clutha District	Balclutha	Otago	South
71	Southland District	Invercargill	Southland	South
72	Gore District	Gore	Southland	South
73	Invercargill City	Invercargill	Southland	South
