= Nelson-Marlborough Regional Council =

Former regional council of New Zealand

Type
- Type: Regional council of Nelson-Marlborough Region

History
- Founded: 1 November 1989
- Disbanded: 1 July 1992

Leadership
- Chair: Len Ardell
- Chief executive officer: Graeme Martin

Structure
- Seats: 13
- Political groups: Independent (13)
- Length of term: 3 years, renewable

Elections
- Last election: 14 October 1989

Meeting place
- Blenheim, New Zealand

The Nelson-Marlborough Regional Council was one of 13 regional councils established on 1 November 1989 in nationwide local government reforms. It was disestablished only three years later on 1 July 1992. The only election held for this regional council was on 14 October 1989, when 73 candidates contested the 13 available positions. The dissolution resulted in three areas becoming unitary authorities (Tasman, Nelson, and Marlborough), with Kaikoura District transferred to the Canterbury Regional Council.

== History ==
=== Creation ===
In the 1989 local government reforms, the Local Government Commission created 13 regional councils and 1 unitary authority (Gisborne District). For the top of the South Island, it had initially been considered for the West Coast to be part of the Nelson-Marlborough Regional Council. Brian Elwood, the chairperson of the Local Government Commission, stated that the top of the South Island was among the most difficult areas to resolve for the commission.

The Local Government Commission determined that Blenheim was to be the seat of administration for the Nelson-Marlborough Regional Council. Graeme Martin was the council's chief executive. Kaikoura District had belonged to the Nelson-Marlborough Regional Council. The National Party opposition MPs for the Rangiora and Marlborough electorates, Jim Gerard and Doug Kidd, surveyed the residents of Kaikoura in 1989 before the region was established and found that the overwhelming majority wanted to belong to Canterbury rather than Marlborough.

=== Disestablishment ===
The Fourth National Government introduced a bill in December 1991 that would potentially abolish the Nelson-Marlborough Regional Council and replace it with three unitary authorities. This was shepherded by Warren Cooper as minister of local government. Part of the reorganisation was to determine what would happen to the Kaikoura part of the region; options were for Kaikoura District to be amalgamated with Marlborough District, or for it to remain its own district, but assigned to the Canterbury Region. If the outcome of the review was for the regional council to be maintained, it was envisaged that it would continue with ten elected members. Public consultation was open until 17 February 1992. The review was undertaken by the Local Government Commission, still chaired by Elwood.

The government conducted a poll as part of its deliberations as suggested by local National MPs Nick Smith (Tasman electorate) and Doug Kidd (Marlborough electorate). This was criticised by Labour's opposition MP George Hawkins, who held the shadow local government portfolio, as an "inappropriate use of taxpayer funds". Tasman District councillors passed a majority resolution in February 1992 against the abolition of the regional council with the rationale that the process was rushed. The ratepayer poll showed overwhelming support for scrapping the regional council.

The Local Government Amendment Act 1992 achieved royal assent on 20 May 1992. The act disestablished the Nelson-Marlborough Regional Council after only three years on 1 July 1992. The regional functions went to Nelson City Council, Tasman District Council, and Marlborough District Council, which thus became unitary authorities. Marlborough District Council was chosen as the residual authority for the outgoing regional council, responsible for preparing the regional council's annual report, receive and make payments, levy and collect rates, and become responsible for all assets that have not been transferred by 30 June 1992. In addition, Marlborough District Council had to take on all staff who had not been transferred to the replacement authorities by 30 June 1992.

With the 1992 reform, Kaikoura District was retained, but transferred to the Canterbury Regional Council. Before 1992, Gisborne District had been the only unitary authority.

== Constituencies and membership ==
The Nelson-Marlborough Region was divided into four constituencies with 13 members:

- Kaikoura constituency (1 member1)
- Marlborough constituency (4 members)
- Nelson constituency (4 members)
- Tasman constituency (4 members)

The election was held on 14 October 1989. There was healthy competition for the available positions. There were 14 candidates in Nelson, 30 in Marlborough, 23 in Tasman, and 6 in Kaikoura. The following table shows the members elected:

Name	Regional constituency
Bryan Seddon	Kaikoura
Leo McKendry	Marlborough
Glenys Baldick	Marlborough
Lin Randle	Marlborough
Basil Parkes	Marlborough
Len Ardell	Nelson
Craig Potton	Nelson
Derek Shaw	Nelson
Ted Krammer	Nelson
John Krammer	Tasman
Murray Borlasse	Tasman
David Ogilvie	Tasman
Elaine Henry	Tasman

The councillors elected Len Ardell as their chairperson.
