= Nelson City Council =

Unitary authority of New Zealand

Nelson City Council Te Kaunihera o Whakatū
- Coat of arms

- Brand logo

Type
- Type: Territorial authority of Nelson
- Term limits: None

History
- Established: 1 November 1989; 36 years ago
- Preceded by: Nelson City Council
- New session started: 17 October 2025

Leadership
- Mayor: Nick Smith, Ind. since 14 October 2022
- Deputy: Pete Rainey, Ind. since 29 October 2025
- CEO: Nigel Philpott since 3 April 2023

Structure
- Seats: 13 (including mayor)
- Political groups: Independent (12); Labour (1)
- Length of term: 3 years

Elections
- Voting system: Single transferable vote
- First election: 14 October 1989
- Last election: 11 October 2025
- Next election: 14 October 2028

Motto
- Palman qui meruit ferat

Meeting place
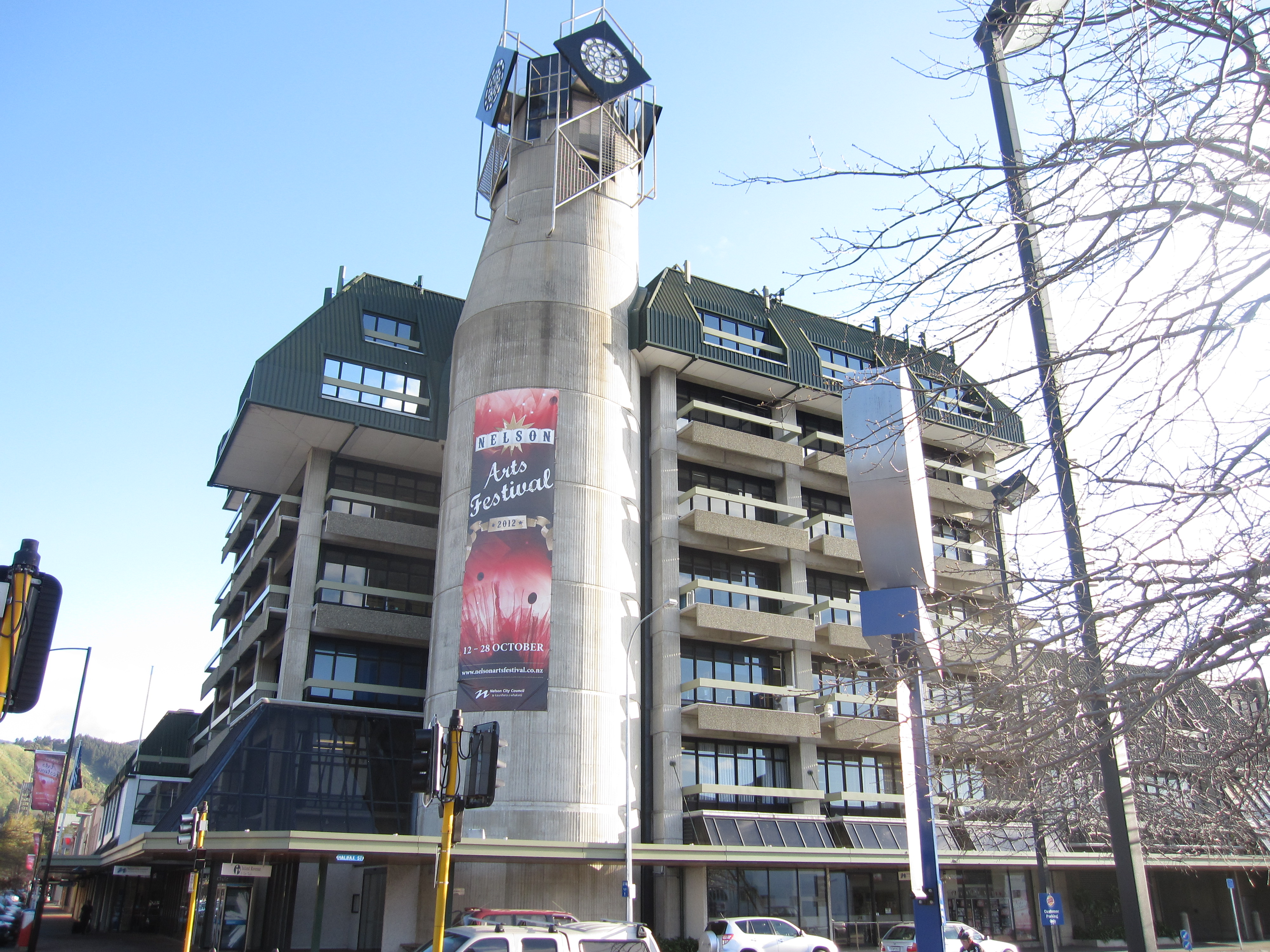
- 110 Trafalgar Street

Website
- nelson.govt.nz

Nelson City Council (abbr. NCC; Māori: Te Kaunihera o Whakatū) is the territorial authority for the city of Nelson, New Zealand. It serves as the city's local and regional government as a unitary authority.

A city council for the city was first formed in 1874. Following the 1989 reforms to local government, that city council was dissolved and the current authority established.

The governing body of the council has 11 councillors and is chaired by the mayor of Nelson (currently Nick Smith since October 2022).

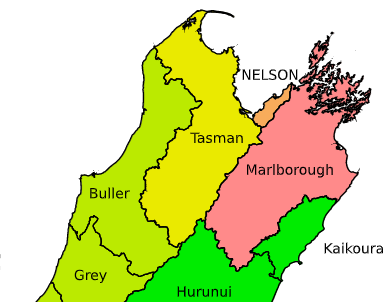
Nelson City Council's area shown in orange

== History ==
=== Predecessors ===
Local governance of Nelson began with Nelson Province in 1853, which covered the entire upper South Island. The town of Nelson was managed by the Nelson Board of Works, constituted by the provincial council under the Nelson Improvement Act 1856. Nelson became a borough and the board of works became Nelson City Council on 30 March 1874.

=== 1989 reforms ===
In the 1989 local government reforms, Nelson City Council was constituted a territorial authority within the Nelson-Marlborough Region. Under the Local Government Amendment Act 1992, the Nelson-Marlborough Regional Council was disestablished on 1 July 1992 and its functions taken over by Nelson City Council, Marlborough District Council and Tasman District Council, which all became unitary authorities. Nelson became constituted as "'The Nelson Region', which shall comprise the area of Nelson City".

On 12 October 2013, Rachel Reese was elected as Nelson's first woman mayor after receiving 1,500 votes more than incumbent mayor Aldo Miccio.

=== Climate emergency declaration ===
In 2019, the council declared climate change an emergency situation.

== Governing body ==
=== Mayor ===
One mayor is elected at-large; they chair meetings of the governing body and act as the head of local government in the city.

=== Current composition ===
The current members of the governing body of council are:

Role	Portrait	Name	Affiliation	Ward
Mayor		Nick Smith	Independent	Elected at-large
Deputy		Pete Rainey	Independent	Central
Councillor		Matty Anderson	Independent	Central
Councillor		Lisa Austin	Independent	Central
Councillor		James Hodgson	Independent	Central
Councillor		Trudie Brand	Independent	Stoke-Tāhunanui
Councillor		Mel Courtney	Independent	Stoke-Tāhunanui
Councillor		Sarah Kerby	Labour	Stoke-Tāhunanui
Councillor		Campbell Rollo	Independent	Stoke-Tāhunanui
Councillor		Nigel Skeggs	Independent	At-large
Councillor		Tim Skinner	Independent	At-large
Councillor		Aaron Stallard	Independent	At-large
Councillor		Kahu Paki Paki	Independent	Māori
