= Joseph Shephard =

New Zealand politician

New Zealand Parliament
Years	Term	Electorate	Party
1871–1875	5th	Waimea	Independent
1879–1881	7th	Waimea	Independent
1881–1884	8th	Waimea	Independent
1884–1885	9th	Waimea	Independent

Joseph Shephard (1822 – 25 October 1898) was a 19th-century Member of Parliament from Nelson, New Zealand.

== Biography ==
Shephard arrived in Nelson in 1861 on the Donna Lita. For several years, he was an editor for the Nelson newspaper Colonist.

He unsuccessfully contested the Waimea electorate in the 1867 by-election, and the City of Nelson electorate in the 1868 by-election.

He represented the Waimea electorate from 1871 to 1875, when he was defeated; and from 1879 to 1885 when he resigned. At the nomination meeting on 5 September 1879, Shephard, Albert Pitt, Oswald Curtis and Acton Adams were proposed, the latter three without their knowledge or consent, presumably by opponents of George Grey who had the support of Shephard. With Pitt, Curtis and Adams all formally withdrawing from the contest, the returning officer declared Shephard elected unopposed.

He was appointed to the Legislative Council in 1885, where he served until he died in 1898.

New Zealand Parliament
Preceded by Edward Baigent	Member of Parliament for Waimea; 1871–1875; 1879–1885	Succeeded by Edward Baigent
Preceded by Edward Baigent	Member of Parliament for Waimea; 1871–1875; 1879–1885	Succeeded by John Kerr
