= Nathaniel Edwards (politician) =

New Zealand politician

Nathaniel Edwards MLC (1822 – 15 July 1880) was a 19th-century Member of Parliament from Nelson, New Zealand.

== Early life ==
Nathaniel Edwards was born in 1822 in Derbyshire, England. His parents were solicitor William Edwards and his wife Mary Ann (née Allen). He arrived in Nelson in January 1845 on the Slams Castle from London, England. as partner in the firm of Nattrass and Edwards, along with machinery for a flax-dressing mill. This machinery was set up in the swamps of the Wakapuaka flats, but the experiments proved unsuccessful and ended in 1846. With this failure Edwards was thrown upon his own resources and he worked with surveyors Joseph Ward and Cyrus Goulter in the Wairau. He was still working as a surveyor on 13 September 1855 when he married in Nelson to 20-year-old Annie Augusta Nicholas Laking, daughter of Dr and Mrs Laking of Waimea West. They had 16 children. His eldest son died in Paris in 1876 from typhoid fever. He was 19 years old.

== Nathaniel Edwards and Co ==
In 1856 Edwards joined the firm of Fell and Seymour, Merchants & Commission Agents, as a clerk and auctioneer and took over the company in 1857 with George Bennett. The new firm became Edwards & Co, a mercantile, importing, and shipping company. One branch of the firm was involved in shipping. In 1864 N. Edwards & Co purchased the site of the earthquake-damaged Wesleyan Church on the corner of Bridge and Rutherford Streets and built a large two-storeyed building designed by architect William Beatson which contained offices and a bulk store on the ground floor and drapery, soft goods and ironmongery departments on the upper floor.

In 1864 Nelson had been struck with gold fever. Edward's company's purchase of the Wallabi proved justified and business was so brisk that the Company decided that a further steamship was essential. The Kennedy, an Australian steamship of 149 tons that had been built for the Australian Steam Navigation Co., Sydney became available and was purchased. This vessel had a twin screw propulsion system which was new at that time. In 1866 Nathaniel Edwards announced his retirement from business and sold his share of the mercantile firm to his partners. He retained the shipping department until Symons took it over in 1870, renaming it the Anchor Line of Steam Packets. Symons commissioned a pennant for his ships, designed by the artist William Cook, and featuring an anchor. This was the start of Nelson's long-running Anchor Shipping and Foundry Company, which eventually closed in 1973. Edwards opened a mercantile firm in Christchurch with partners Aiken, Bennett & Co., and after four years retired to Nelson. In the late 1860s Edwards joined John Kerr Jnr in Partnership in the Tarndale run, which at the time included the Rainbow run. After ten years the run was sold to William Acton Adams.

== Warwick House ==
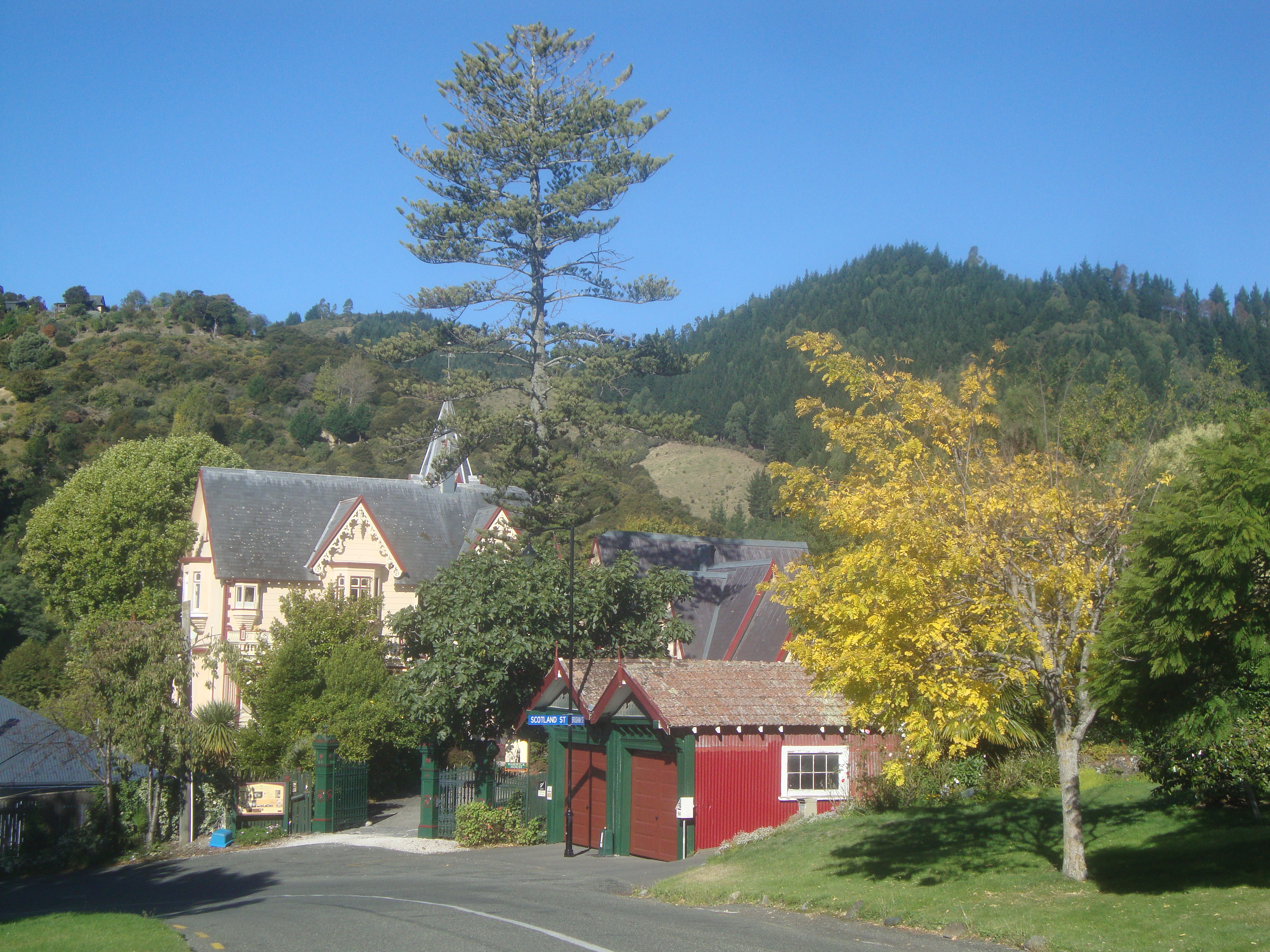
Warwick House as seen from Brougham Street

Warwick House, 64 Brougham Street, Nelson is one of the finest and largest examples of early Victorian Gothic Revivalism still remaining in New Zealand. The house, originally known as Sunnyside, was built for Arthur Fell (father of Charles Fell) in 1854 by builder David Goodall.

Fell returned to England in the 1860s and sold his house and business to Edwards. Edwards expanded the house; firstly adding a new wing on the southern side consisting of fifteen rooms and two towers, and secondly adding the three storey north wing with a ballroom and four storey tower. When completed the house had about 50 rooms. The building was registered on 25 November 1982 as Category II with Heritage New Zealand, with registration number 1618.

== Political career ==
New Zealand Parliament
Years	Term	Electorate	Party
1868–1870	4th	City of Nelson	Independent

Edwards served intermittently on the Nelson Provincial Council (1868–1869 and 1875–1876). In 1868, after Edward Stafford had resigned, he was elected to represent the City of Nelson electorate from 1868 to 1870, when he retired. He was appointed to the Legislative Council on 9 July 1872 by the Fox Ministry and served until his death.

In 1879 Edwards fell terminally ill from a bronchial affection. When Edwards died on 15 July 1880, his estate was valued at eight hundred thousand pounds sterling, which was considerable in those days.

== Notes ==
New Zealand Parliament
Preceded by Edward Stafford	Member of Parliament for Nelson; 1868–1870; Served alongside: Oswald Curtis	Succeeded by Martin Lightband
