= Walter Moffatt =

Former Mayor of Nelson (1866–1938)

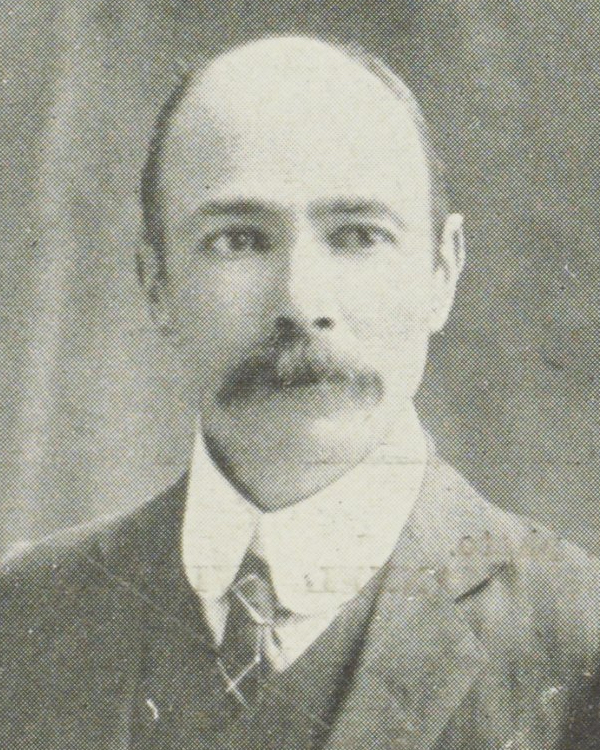
- Moffatt, c. 1911

16th Mayor of Nelson
- In office 1927–1935
- Preceded by: William Lock
- Succeeded by: George Page

Personal details
- Born: Walter John Moffatt; 5 October 1866 Motueka, New Zealand
- Died: 14 May 1938 (aged 71) Nelson, New Zealand
- Spouse: Fanny Tasker (m. 1890)
- Occupation: Coachbuilder

Walter John Moffatt (5 October 1866 – 14 May 1938) was a local-body politician in New Zealand. He was Mayor of Nelson from 1927 to 1935.

== Early life and family ==
The son of Harry Louis Moffatt, wharfinger at Motueka, Moffatt was a coachbuilder by trade having served his time in Nelson and Motueka. He followed his occupation in Feilding, Palmerston North, and Marton, before returning to Motueka to set up his own business. He was married to Fanny (Ette) Tasker with three children, two sons and one daughter.

== Political career ==
Moffatt resettled in Motueka in 1886. In 1899, Moffatt was on the Motueka Road Board, when it decided to break away from Waimea County Council and set up the Motueka Borough Council.

That same year Moffatt stood against Roderick McKenzie, a Seddon supporter, for the Motueka parliamentary seat and then, having been unsuccessful, stood in 1900 for the new Motueka Borough Council. In 1902, Moffatt stood for Motueka Mayor but was unsuccessful. He stood unsuccessfully again in 1904. Moffatt did not stand for the Borough Council in 1905.

In 1906, Moffatt was a successful candidate for the Motueka Harbour Board. In 1907, he stood again for Council and was tied in 6th place with Arthur Grooby. To determine who would be elected councillor, the returning officer drew lots, which resulted in Moffatt's being the successful candidate.

Moffatt retired from business and moved from Motueka to Nelson in October 1907. In 1908, he stood for the Nelson constituency against John Graham and Harry Atmore. He gained only 317 votes to their 2909 and 2713 votes.

Moffatt stood for the Nelson Harbour Board in 1911 and 1913 but was unsuccessful. Moffatt also stood again for the Nelson electorate, this time receiving a greatly increased number of votes, but still losing to Harry Atmore in the second ballot. The papers of the time noted that Moffat's campaign had been a fair one centred solely on political issues. It also noted that this had enhanced his standing in the community.

In 1915, Moffatt stood for and became a Nelson City Councillor.

=== Mayoralty ===
Moffatt first contested the Mayoralty in 1927, defeating the sitting Mayor, William Lock. In 1929 Lock contested the Mayoralty again, but was defeated by Moffatt 1935 votes to 1448. Moffatt was elected unopposed in 1931 and 1933. Moffatt did not stand for election in 1935 due to ill health and was succeeded by George Page. At the persuasion of the other Councillors he did stand successfully for Council.

In 1935, Moffatt was awarded the King George V Silver Jubilee Medal.

== Community service ==
Moffatt was involved with a number of community organisations. In 1900 he was among those who sought to establish a volunteer Corps in Motueka. He was chair of the Motueka School Committee and in 1909 elected to the Nelson City School Committee. An Ancient Order of Foresters friendly society member. A member of the Motueka Fruitgrowers Co-operative Association. Moffatt was a representative for the Huia Rugby Football Club on the Nelson Rugby Union. He was a member of the Nelson Debating Society and the Nelson Provincial Scottish Society.

Moffatt was named as one of the founders of the Nelson Advancement Society in 1914 and was also noted as being one of the main drivers behind the establishment of Motueka High School.

== Death ==
Moffatt died on 14 May 1938 aged 71. He was buried at Wakapuaka Cemetery.

Political offices
| Preceded by William Lock | Mayor of Nelson; 1927–1935 | Succeeded by George Page |
