= William Lock =

Mayor of Nelson, New Zealand

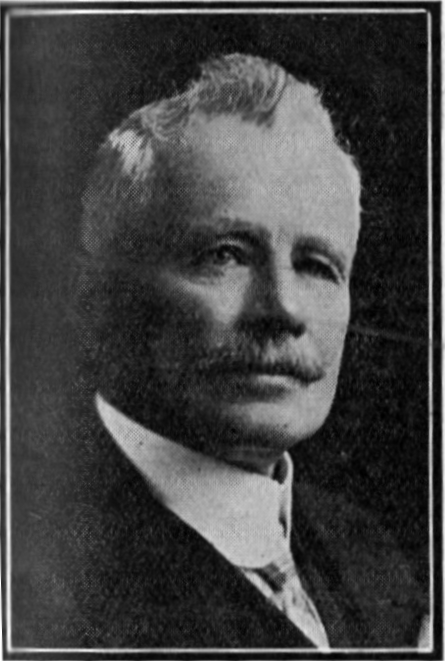

13th Mayor of Nelson
- In office 1913–1915
- Preceded by: Thomas Field
- Succeeded by: Charles Harley
- In office 1921–1927
- Preceded by: William Snodgrass
- Succeeded by: Walter Moffatt

Personal details
- Born: 1 May 1858 Nelson, New Zealand
- Died: 20 July 1940 (aged 82) Nelson, New Zealand
- Spouse: Esther Levien (m. 1892)
- Occupation: Grain and produce merchant

William Lock (1 May 1858 – 20 July 1940) was Mayor of Nelson, New Zealand, from 1913 to 1915 and again from 1921 to 1927. Lock was an auctioneer, and a grain and produce merchant for 40 years. During his term as mayor, HMS New Zealand visited Nelson in 1913. Lock died on 20 July 1940 at his home in Collingwood Street, Nelson.

== Politics ==
The 1893 general election was contested by four candidates in the Nelson electorate: John Graham (1289 votes – elected), Richmond Hursthouse (1011 votes), John Kerr (910 votes) and Lock (74 votes).

=== Local government ===
In Lock's 1913 campaign for the mayoralty he sought lower rates and better use of Council funds. Lock was elected with 1,226 votes to William Wallace Snodgrass' 1,134. In 1914 Snodgrass mounted a strong campaign against Lock, citing his failure to meet his election promises. Lock, with support from some councillors, mounted an equally strong campaign against Snodgrass, making it one of the fiercest election battles the city had seen. The final count was so close (5 votes) that it took a further week before the outcome was confirmed. Lock won by 1050 votes to Snodgrass' 1045.

Lock stood again in 1915. Charles Harley campaigned against him and became mayor, winning by 1,223 votes to 1,065. Harley retired in 1917, and Snodgrass and Lock competed again for the mayoralty. Snodgrass won 1,189 votes to 1,149. In the 1919 election Snodgrass won by 1,283 votes to 1,189 against Lock.

Lock's persistence paid off with him being elected from 1921 to 1927. In 1927 he was defeated by W J Moffatt's 1,538 votes to his 1,449 votes. He stood again in 1931 and was defeated again by Moffatt.

== Other institutions ==
Lock was chairman of the Education Board, a member of the Hospital and Charitable Aid Board, and a number of other civic organisations including the New Zealand Municipal Association, Nelson Harbour Board, and Cawthron Trust Board. His service with the Education Board spanned 30 years.

His wife Esther was also prominent in service to the community.

Political offices
Preceded by Thomas Field	Mayor of Nelson; 1913–1915; 1921–1927	Succeeded by Charles Harley
Preceded by William Snodgrass	Mayor of Nelson; 1913–1915; 1921–1927	Succeeded by Walter Moffatt
