= A. N. Field =

Arthur Nelson Field
- Born: 27 February 1882; Nelson, New Zealand
- Died: 3 January 1963 (aged 80)
- Occupation: Journalist
- Parent: Thomas Field

Arthur Nelson Field (27 February 1882 – 3 January 1963) was a New Zealand journalist, writer and political activist.

Born in Nelson, he was the first son of four children born to Tom Field and Jessica Black. His father was managing director of Wilkins and Field Hardware in his native city, which his grandfather had founded, and served as a Nelson City Councillor and Reform Party member of parliament for the Nelson electorate from 1914 to 1919.

Field took up journalism and worked as a reporter for The Evening Post, Taranaki Herald, Poverty Bay Herald and Melbourne Argus (1901–1907), before returning to Nelson in 1907. He served as a Wellington Dominion columnist for the next 21 years (1907–1928). There was a break during this period when he served as a Royal Navy sub-lieutenant and adjutant at Portsmouth, and on board RNV Spenser in the North Sea. He returned to New Zealand when discharged in 1914.

== Career and associations ==
While working as a journalist and serving in the Navy, Field became involved in right-wing politics. In 1909 he published The Citizen, an early far right publication which upheld motherhood, eugenics and monetary reform, and opposed "Maori Obstructionism" for seven years, 1912–1919.

After that period, he also became involved with "The Britons", a group that specialised in publishing New Zealand editions of The Protocols of the Learned Elders of Zion and published a New Zealand edition himself. During the Second World War, he was kept under surveillance by the Security Intelligence Bureau of New Zealand's Department of External Affairs.

Field won later "acclaim" from kindred anti-socialists such as the League of Empire Loyalists and the late Eric Butler of the Australian League of Rights.

Marcus van Rooij wrote a paper on A.N. Field's influence on Australian neofascism, suggesting his conspiracy theory discourse impacted on other such Australian organisations during the Depression era. In particular, The Truth About the Slump (1931, 1932) enjoyed widespread circulation and stimulated the interest of organisations such as the Guild of Watchmen of Australia, the Australian Catholic Truth Society, the League of Truth, the British Australian Racial Body, and Evangelical Publishing Company of New South Wales. Australian anti-Semite Patricia Lewin cited Truth About the Slump in her tract, The Key (1933), as did numerous other Australian Social Credit and Douglas Credit Party figures that based their work on the monetary theories of C.H. Douglas. Rooij designated him the "Kiwi theoretician of the Australian Radical Right".

Field was a creationist. He authored the book Why Colleges Breed Communists (1941). It was republished in 1971 under the title The Evolution Hoax Exposed.

Despite the recognition of his work in Australia and the United States, and the circulation of his books within those countries, Field preferred to work from his isolated Nelson homestead. In his later years, Field wrote a series of self-published tracts on his interpretations of economics, anti-socialist articles about the New Zealand Labour Party and trade union movement, and related matters. Some were republished in the United States in the early 1960s. Field died in 1963 aged 80 at a private hospital in Nelson.

== Arthur Nelson Field Collection ==
Field's collection of more than 2500 right-wing publications was acquired by the Alexander Turnbull Library at the National Library of New Zealand on the year of his death. The collection includes over 650 of his own books, pamphlets, periodicals, manuscripts and ephemera published between 1890 and 1970, and now accounts for one of the largest complete collections of published right-wing materials available to the public anywhere in the world.

== Bibliography ==
- Wanted: Accurate Data about Human Heredity. Timaru: Timaru Post Publishing, 1911.
- Medical Marriage Certificates. London: Eugenic Education Society, 1912.
- The Defence Department's Failure. Wellington: Wellington Publishing Company, 1915.
- The Truth about the Slump: What the News Never Tells You. Nelson: A. N. Field, 1931, 1932.
- The Stabilisation of Money. Nelson: A. N. Field: 1934.
- The Protocols of the Elders of Zion. Nelson: A. N. Field, 1934.
- The Untaught History of Money. Nelson: A.N. Field, 1938.
- All These Things, Vol. 1. Nelson: A.N. Field, 1936.
- Socialism Unmasked. Nelson: A.N. Field, 1938.
- Why Colleges Breed Communists. Hawthorne, California: Omni Publishing, 1941.
- The Bretton Woods Plot. Nelson: A. N. Field, 1957.
- All These Things, Vol. 2. Hawthorne, California: Omni Publishing, 1963.
- The Truth About New Zealand. Bullsbrook: Veritas Books, 1987.
