= 1879 City of Nelson by-election =

New Zealand by-election

The 1879 City of Nelson by-election was a by-election held on 6 February 1879 in the City of Nelson electorate during the 6th New Zealand Parliament.

The by-election was caused by the resignation of the incumbent MP John Sharp.

The by-election was won by Acton Adams. He was described as the “Secularist” candidate; as with David Goldie in the 1879 City of Auckland West by-election; both favouring secular not denominational education.

The following table gives the election result:

1879 City of Nelson by-election
Party	Candidate	Votes	%	±%
Independent	Acton Adams	369	61.3	
Independent	Albert Pitt	252	38.7	
Turnout		119		
Majority		27		
