= John Kerr (Nelson politician) =

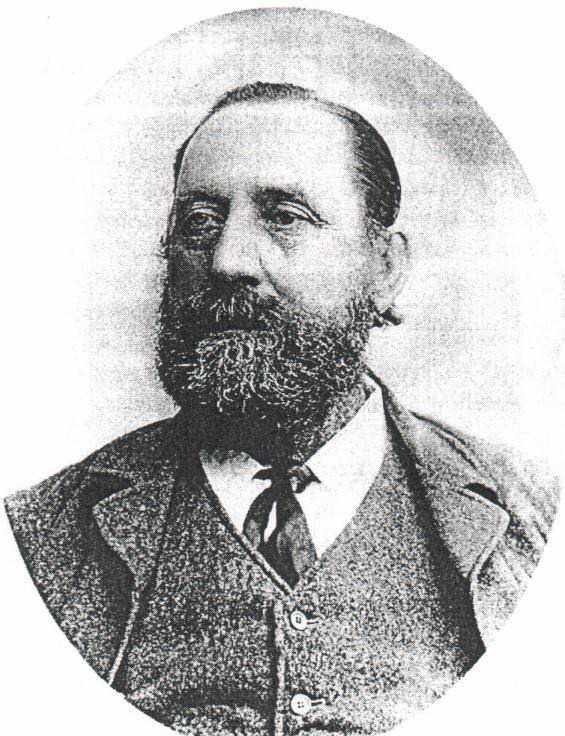

Member of the New Zealand Parliament for Waimea
- In office 3 June 1885 – 10 June 1887
- Majority: 3

Member of the New Zealand Parliament for Motueka
- In office 26 September 1887 – 17 September 1890
- Majority: 141

Personal details
- Born: 1830 Scotland
- Died: 3 May 1898 (aged 67–68) Lake Rotoiti, New Zealand

John Kerr (1830 – 3 May 1898) was a 19th-century Member of Parliament from Nelson, New Zealand. As well as Lake Station (including Lake Rotoiti and Pourangahau / Mount Robert), Kerr also owned the 70,000 acres (28,000 ha) Tarndale Run and 30,000 acres (12,000 ha) around the Wairau River before entering into a business partnership with Molesworth Station owner Acton Adams. Kerr commissioned cob builder Ned James to build Tarndale homestead in 1874.

== Biography ==
New Zealand Parliament
Years	Term	Electorate	Party
1885–1887	9th	Waimea	Independent
1887–1890	10th	Motueka	Independent

Kerr was born in 1830 in the south of Scotland. His father's name was also John Kerr. The family emigrated to New Zealand in 1842 on the Fifeshire and settled in Waimea West. Early in his life, he was engaged in whaling in the Tory Channel / Kura Te Au. He was a butcher in Nelson before he started sheep farming at Lake Station.

Following the resignation from Parliament of Joseph Shephard, who had been appointed to the Legislative Council, a Waimea by-election was held on 3 June 1885. It was contested by six candidates: Kerr (253 votes), W. N. Franklyn (250 votes), William White (94 votes), Christian Dencker (91 votes), William Wastney (59 votes) and Jesse Piper (32 votes). Kerr was thus elected.

Kerr represented the Waimea electorate until 1887, and then the Motueka electorate from 1887 to 1890. In the 1890 general election, he contested the Nelson electorate and was narrowly defeated by Joseph Harkness. The 1893 general election was contested by four candidates in Nelson: John Graham (1289 votes – elected), Richmond Hursthouse (1011 votes), Kerr (910 votes) and William Lock (74 votes).

Kerr drowned in Lake Rotoiti in 1898. His grandson, the solicitor John Robert Kerr, unsuccessfully contested the Nelson electorate in the 1938 general election.

New Zealand Parliament
Preceded by Joseph Shephard	Member of Parliament for Waimea; 1885–1887	Constituency abolished
Preceded by Richmond Hursthouse	Member of Parliament for Motueka; 1887–1890	In abeyance Title next held by Roderick McKenzie
