= 1885 Waimea by-election =

New Zealand by-election

The 1885 Waimea by-election was a by-election held on 3 June 1885 in the Waimea electorate during the 9th New Zealand Parliament.

The by-election was caused by the resignation of the incumbent MP Joseph Shephard on 15 April 1885.

The by-election was won by John Kerr. The runner up was William Norris Franklyn (who, at some point, was chair of Waimea County Council) by three votes, with six candidates having contested the election.

== Results ==
1885 Waimea by-election
| Party | Candidate | Votes | % | ±% |
|---|---|---|---|---|
| Independent | John Kerr | 253 | 42.38 | |
| Independent | William Norris Franklyn | 250 | 41.88 | |
| Independent | William Whyte | 94 | 15.75 | |
| Independent | Christian Dencker | 91 | 15.24 | |
| Independent | William Wastney | 59 | 9.88 | |
| Independent | Jesse Piper | 32 | 5.36 | |
| Turnout | | 597 | | |
| Majority | | 3 | 0.50 | |
