= 1889 Nelson by-election =

New Zealand by-election

The 1889 Nelson by-election was a by-election held on 3 April 1889 in the Nelson electorate during the 10th New Zealand Parliament.

The by-election was caused by the death on 11 February of the incumbent MP Henry Levestam. The by-election was won by Joseph Harkness. He was opposed by the Mayor of Nelson, John Sharp. Sharp had been the MP until he resigned in 1879.

== Results ==
The following table gives the election result:

1889 Nelson by-election
Party	Candidate	Votes	%	±%
Independent	Joseph Harkness	659	57.86	
Independent	John Sharp	480	42.14	
Majority		179	15.72	
Turnout		1139		
