= George Page (mayor) =

17th Mayor of Nelson
- In office 1935–1941
- Preceded by: Walter Moffatt
- Succeeded by: Edgar Neale

Personal details
- Born: George Lloyd Page; 31 March 1878 Bilston, Staffordshire, England
- Died: 8 November 1972 (aged 94) Nelson, New Zealand
- Spouse: Mary Highet (m. 1905)
- Occupation: Furniture retailer

George Lloyd Page (31 March 1878 – 8 November 1972) was Mayor of Nelson, New Zealand from 1935 to 1941.

== Private life and professional career ==
Page was born in Bilston, Staffordshire, England on 31 March 1878 and his family migrated to New Zealand in 1879. His father was also named George.

Page attended Hampton Street Primary School, Nelson. He also played in the Nelson Garrison Band under Herr Gustav Handke and was noted as a fine musician. In December 1898 Page joined his father's furniture making business, George Page and Sons. When his father died in 1912 he had become its Managing Director.

He married Mary Highet, the daughter of T M Highet, on 27 April 1905 at Roseneath, Wellington. The Pages had two sons and three daughters.

Page represented Nelson in cricket and rugby. He was also involved in setting up the Nelson Basketball League in 1925.

He was also a keen worker in youth movements and was a Director of the YMCA. He was first chairman of the Friendly Society Dispensary-Board and of the Starr-Bowkett Society. Page served on the Nelson Licensing Committee.

Page died at Nelson in 1972, and was buried at Marsden Valley Cemetery, Stoke.

== Political career ==
He became a City Councillor in 1929 and was Chair of the local Unemployment Committee for three years (1931–1934) and president of the Smith Family since its inception.

In 1935 he stood for the Mayoralty against H E A Washbourne and was elected by 2699 votes to 1407. During his term as Mayor Nelson Airport was constructed.

Page did not stand in 1941 due to ill health and Edgar Neale, the Deputy Mayor, replaced him.

Political offices
Preceded by Walter Moffatt	Mayor of Nelson; 1935–1941	Succeeded by Edgar Neale
