= Thomas Field (politician) =

New Zealand politician (1859–1937)

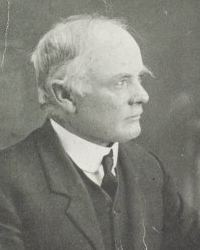

Member of the New Zealand Parliament for Nelson
- In office 10 December 1914 – 17 December 1919
- Preceded by: Harry Atmore
- Succeeded by: Harry Atmore

12th Mayor of Nelson
- In office 1911–1913
- Preceded by: Thomas Pettit
- Succeeded by: William Lock

Personal details
- Born: Thomas Andrew Hemming Field; 1859 Long Gully, Victoria, Australia
- Died: 27 October 1937 (aged 78) Nelson, New Zealand
- Resting place: Wakapuaka Cemetery
- Spouse: Jessie Black (m. 1881)
- Relations: Arthur Nelson Field (son)

Thomas Andrew Hemming Field (1859 – 27 October 1937) was a New Zealand politician of the Reform Party.

== Early life and family ==
Field was born in Long Gully, Colony of Victoria, in 1859, the son of Thomas Field, who had migrated from Ireland to Sydney in 1845. The family emigrated to New Zealand in 1862, settling in Nelson, where Field attended Nelson College from 1871 to 1872. He married Jessie Black at Nelson on 24 May 1881, and they had two sons and two daughters. Their eldest son Arthur Nelson Field was a journalist and right-wing author.

In 1885, Field became one of the first cyclists to ride the length of New Zealand.

== Wilkins and Field ==
Field was managing director with his brother Henry Montague Field (1863–1939) of Wilkins and Field Hardware in Nelson. The firm was founded by his father Thomas Field Sr. (1833–1918) in 1866 in Westport, and became Wilkins and Field in 1880 when William Chivers Wilkins (1841–1906) joined the business in Nelson.

== Political career ==
New Zealand Parliament
Years	Term	Electorate	Party
1914–1919	19th	Nelson	Reform

He was first elected as a Nelson City Councillor in 1907 and served in that capacity for four years. He was deputy mayor in 1910, and Mayor of Nelson between 1911 and 1913. In 1911 Field defeated Thomas Pettit 1231 votes to 1047. Field did not stand in 1913.

He held the Nelson electorate for one parliamentary term, from 1914 to 1919, after defeating Harry Atmore in 1914, but Atmore won the seat back in 1919, and held it for 27 more years.

Field also served as a member of the Nelson Hospital Board, president of both the Nelson Chamber of Commerce and the Nelson Philosophical Institute, and a trustee of the Cawthron Institute. He died suddenly at his office in Nelson on 27 October 1937, and was buried at Wakapuaka Cemetery. He was survived by his wife and his four children.

== See also ==
- Politics of New Zealand

New Zealand Parliament
Preceded by Harry Atmore	Member of Parliament for Nelson; 1914–1919	Succeeded by Harry Atmore
Political offices
Preceded by Thomas Pettit	Mayor of Nelson; 1911–1913	Succeeded by William Lock
