= William Snodgrass (politician) =

English-born New Zealand politician

The Honourable William Snodgrass MBE
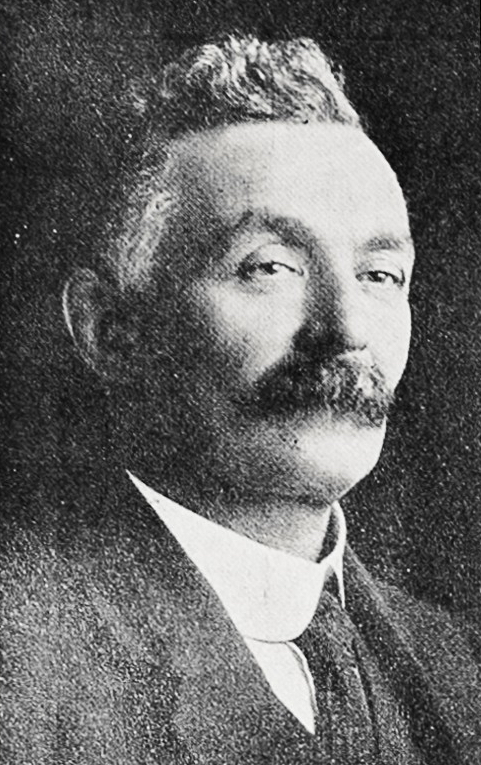
- Snodgrass, c. 1921

15th Mayor of Nelson
- In office 1917–1921
- Preceded by: Charles Harley
- Succeeded by: William Lock

Personal details
- Born: William Wallace Snodgrass; 1870 Liverpool, England
- Died: 20 March 1939 (aged 68–69) missing from TSS Arahura, Cook Strait
- Spouse: Sarah Annie Frankham (m. 1897)
- Relations: Frank Snodgrass (son)

William Wallace Snodgrass MBE (1870 – 20 March 1939) was an English-born politician from Nelson, New Zealand. He was Mayor of Nelson and later a member of the Legislative Council.

== Early life and family ==
Snodgrass was born in Liverpool, England, the son of Robert Snodgrass. His early education was at Liverpool Methodist School. When he was 10 his family migrated to Nelson, New Zealand. On 27 January 1896 Snodgrass married Annie Frankham, the daughter of Walter Frankham, and they had five children — two sons and three daughters — including Wallace Frankham Snodgrass who played three matches for the All Blacks.

== Business ==
Snodgrass was a member of his father's merchant firm of R. Snodgrass and Sons established in 1880 in Nelson. On his Snodgrass's death in 1939 the business was wound up and the premises sold by the official assignee.

== Political career ==
Snodgrass was a City Councillor for three years and elected Mayor from 1917 to 1921. William Lock and he contested the Mayoralty for a number of elections with Lock winning in 1921. He had also been a member of the Nelson Harbour Board from 1914 to 1929.

Snodgrass was appointed to the Legislative Council on 2 September 1921. At the end of his terms, he was reappointed in September 1928 and in September 1935. He remained a member until his disappearance in 1939.

== Community service ==
Snodgrass was President of the Nelson Chamber of Commerce from 1913 to 1914. He was also a member of the Nelson Harbour Board, Patriotic Society, and War Funds Council.

In 1918 he was awarded the MBE for his patriotic work during World War I. He was involved with the establishment of the Nelson Sick and Wounded Soldiers Fund becoming its chair until his death, was noted for meeting all the returning soldiers to Nelson from World War One, made a life member of the Nelson Returned Soldiers' Association, and Chair of the Repatriation Board from 1919 to 1924. He was also a member of the War Funds Council.

In addition Snodgrass was a member of the Nelson Hospital Board, Nelson Chamber of Commerce, and Nelson Provincial Progress League. From 1908 he had been a Trustee of St Andrews Orphanage and from 1910 a Director of the Nelson Permanent Building Society.

In 1935, he was awarded the King George V Silver Jubilee Medal.

== Disappearance ==
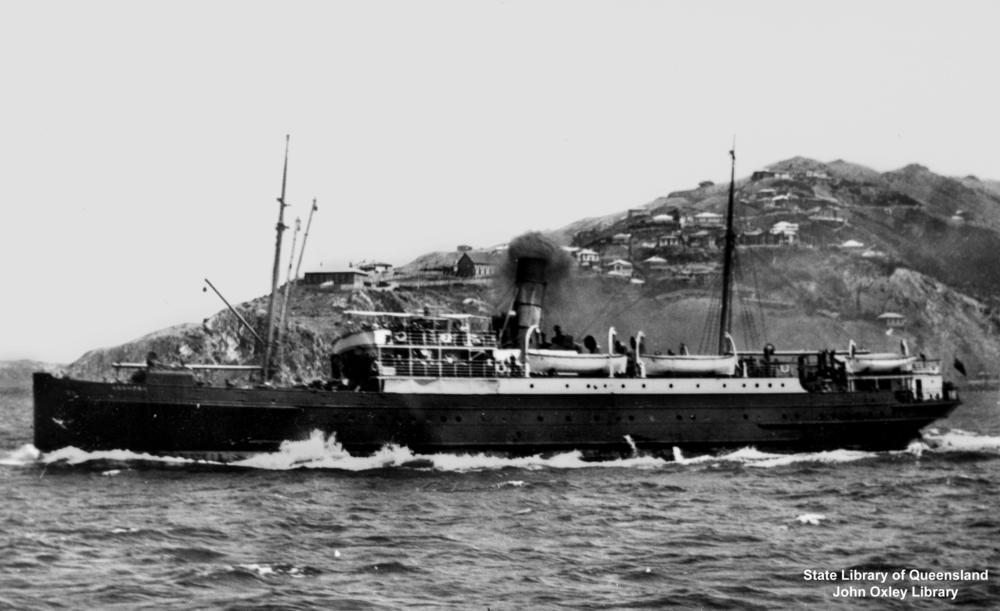
Arahura under way

Snodgrass was a passenger on the Arahura sailing from Wellington to Nelson on 20 March 1939 and disappeared during the voyage. The account of the voyage stated that Snodgrass had supper with the master, Captain Hay, and retired to his cabin fairly early. When the other occupant of the cabin, Walter S. Dillon, went to bed Snodgrass was in his bunk reading, and they later said goodnight. In the morning Snodgrass was missing. His clothes and effects were in the cabin. At the time Snodgrass went missing he was believed to in financial difficulties. When his estate was wound up in 1940 it was in bankruptcy with only enough money to cover 75% of the outstanding debts.

Three years later his daughter, Florence, also died at sea. She was married to Colonel C. S. J. Duff, Commander of the New Zealand Artillery and had been serving in the WAAF in England. She lost her life when SS Port Hunter was torpedoed and sunk by U-582 in the Atlantic north-west of the Canary Islands on 11 July 1942.

== In popular culture ==
A play titled Snodgrass - Nelson's Missing Mayor was written and produced by Nelson-based playwright Miranda Warner. It focuses on Snodgrass's disappearance. After the actors set the scene the audience is encouraged to suggest what happened to him. Based on audience consensus the actors continue the play, giving potentially different endings to each performance.

== See also ==
- List of people who disappeared

Political offices
Preceded by Charles Harley	Mayor of Nelson; 1917–1921	Succeeded by William Lock
