= Frank Snodgrass =

- Born: Wallace Frankham Snodgrass; 24 April 1898 Nelson, New Zealand
- Died: 16 July 1976 (aged 78) Masterton, New Zealand
- School: Nelson College
- Notable relative: William Wallace Snodgrass (father)
- Occupation: Clerk

Rugby union career
- Position: Wing
Provincial / State sides
Years	Team	Apps	(Points)
1917	Hawke's Bay		
1921–32	Nelson		
International career
Years	Team	Apps	(Points)
1923, 1928	New Zealand	0	(0)

Wallace Frankham "Frank" Snodgrass (24 April 1898 – 16 July 1976) was a New Zealand rugby union player. A wing, Snodgrass represented Hawke's Bay and Nelson at a provincial level, and was a member of the New Zealand national side, the All Blacks, in 1923 and 1928. He played three matches for the All Blacks but did not play any internationals.

Snodgrass was educated at Nelson College from 1912 to 1913. His father was William Snodgrass, who served as Mayor of Nelson from 1917 to 1921 and was a member of the Legislative Council.
