= 1881 City of Nelson by-election =

New Zealand by-election

The 1881 Nelson by-election was a by-election held on 7 June 1881 in the City of Nelson electorate during the 7th New Zealand Parliament. The "show of hands" had favoured Richmond (31 to 24).

The by-election was caused by the resignation of the incumbent MP Acton Adams. The by-election was won by Henry Levestam. Richmond was regarded as the Government nominee.

== Results ==
The following table gives the election result:

1881 City of Nelson by-election
Party	Candidate	Votes	%	±%
Independent	Henry Levestam	438	51.83	
Independent	James Crowe Richmond	407	48.17	
Turnout		845		
Majority		31	3.67	
