= Parliamentary Counsel Office (New Zealand) =

- Te Tari Tohutohu Pāremata

Agency overview
- Annual budget: Total budget for 2019/20; Vote Parliamentary Counsel ▲$23,253,000
- Minister responsible: Chris Bishop, Attorney-General
- Agency executive: Cassie Nicholson, Chief Parliamentary Counsel
- Website: https://www.pco.govt.nz/

The Parliamentary Counsel Office (PCO; Māori: Te Tari Tohutohu Pāremata) is New Zealand's law drafting office. It drafts New Zealand Government Bills (except Inland Revenue Bills) and Legislative Instruments. It also publishes all New Zealand Bills, Acts, and Legislative Instruments in print and on the New Zealand Legislation website. It was established as the Law Drafting Office in 1920 and renamed the Parliamentary Counsel Office in 1973.

== History ==
In the years before the enactment of the Statutes Drafting and Compilation Act 1920, the role of Law Draftsman was housed within several different offices. In 1920, the Law Drafting Office was established as a separate office of Parliament by statute. In 1973, the Law Drafting Office was renamed the Parliamentary Counsel Office, the Law Draftsman became the Chief Parliamentary Counsel, and Assistant Law Draftsmen were renamed as Parliamentary Counsel.

In 1985, the Fourth Labour Government reformed the public service via the Parliamentary Service Act 1985. It abolished the Legislative Department and replaced it with the Parliamentary Service and the Parliamentary Service Commission. It also ensured that PCO staff, aside from principal officers, were appointed by the Chief Parliamentary Counsel, within maximum numbers set by the Attorney-General. In 2000, the Parliamentary Service Act 2000 repealed the 1985 Act.

The Legislation Act 2012 modernised the law for publishing, making available, reprinting, and revising official versions of legislation. This was the Government's response to recommendations made in two reports by the Law Commission, and recommendations made by previous Regulations Review Committees.

NZLC R107 pages 30–33 has a more detailed Parliamentary Counsel Office history.

== Organisation ==
The Parliamentary Counsel Office is an executive agency of the New Zealand Parliament and is under the control of the Attorney-General.

== Functions ==
PCO's Parliamentary Counsel are responsible for drafting most New Zealand legislation and publishing the official version of New Zealand Acts of Parliament and Statutory Regulations.

Under section 59 of the Legislation Act 2012 the functions of the PCO are to:

- draft government Bills and Legislative Instruments;
- publish Bills, Acts, Legislative Instruments, and reprints of legislation in electronic and printed forms;
- prepare reprints of Acts and Legislative Instruments;
- prepare Bills to revise Acts in accordance with the current revision programme;
- advise departments and agencies on the drafting of disallowable instruments that are not drafted by the PCO;
- examine local and private Bills, and Members' Bills that the Attorney-General directs to be examined; and
- advise on and assist with the drafting of all local and private Bills, and draft Members' Bills on the Attorney-General's direction.

From time to time, the PCO may also draft certain other instruments at the direction of the Attorney-General or the Chief Parliamentary Counsel.

The Inland Revenue Department is authorised to draft certain Inland Revenue Bills.

The PCO is responsible for supplying printed copies of Bills and Supplementary Order Papers (SOPs) to the House.

== See also ==
- Lists of acts of the New Zealand Parliament
- Law of New Zealand
- Category:Statutes of New Zealand
