= Joseph Harkness =

New Zealand politician

Joseph George Harkness
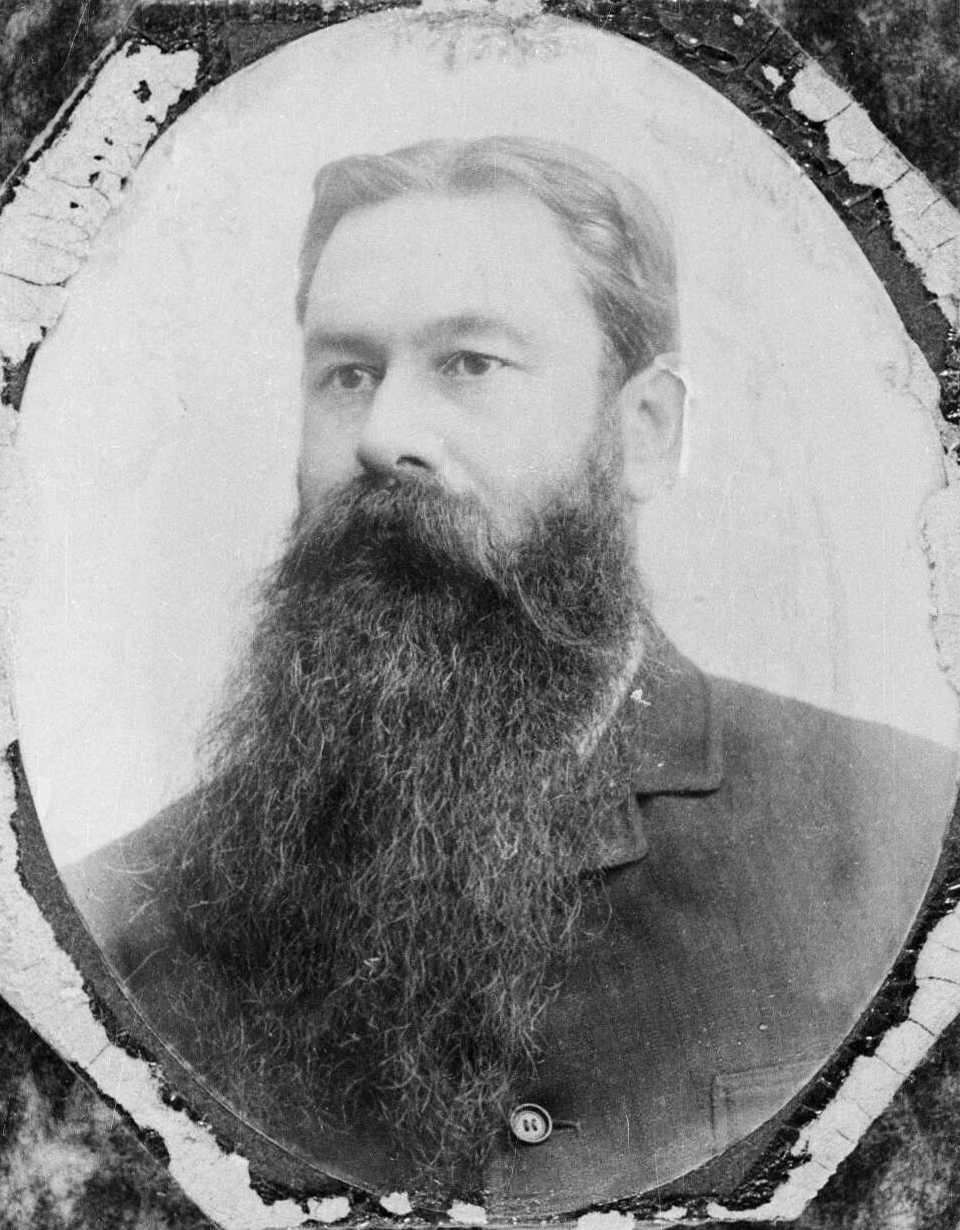

Member of the New Zealand Parliament for Nelson
- In office 3 April 1889 – 28 November 1893
- Preceded by: Henry Levestam
- Succeeded by: John Graham

Personal details
- Born: 1843 Nelson, New Zealand
- Died: 9 January 1930 (aged 79–80) Nelson, New Zealand
- Spouse: Lucy Hodder (m. 1873)

Joseph George Harkness JP (21 July 1850 – 9 January 1930) was a 19th-century independent conservative Member of Parliament from Nelson, New Zealand.

== Early life ==
Harkness, the son of William Harkness, was born and educated at Nelson, attending Richmond School and Nelson College (1867–1868). He became a school teacher for a time.

Harkness dairy farmed in Taranaki and helped organise the dairying industry. He was largely responsible for the co-operative dairy factory company's takeover of the Motorua Freezing Works, New Plymouth. Harkness also helped build up of the National Dairy Association, of which he was its President, secretary, and manager. He secretary of the Dairy Producers Freezing Company from about 1919 to 1929, when he retired. From 1929 he resided Te Horo, Taranaki, where he owned a farm.

== Political career ==
New Zealand Parliament
Years	Term	Electorate	Party
1889–1890	10th	Nelson	Conservative
1890–1893	11th	Nelson	Conservative

The 1887 general election in the Waimea-Picton electorate was contested by Arthur Seymour, Harkness and Charles H. Mills, who received 446, 444 and 415 votes, respectively. Seymour was thus elected. Harkness represented the Nelson electorate from 1889 to 1893, when he retired. The 1890 general election was contested by Harkness, John Kerr and Francis William Flowerday, who received 672, 655 and 94 votes, respectively.

The contested the Masterton electorate in the 1893 election and was beaten by the incumbent, Alexander Hogg.

== Civic service ==
Harkness lived in Khandallah, Wellington for a number of years and was Mayor of the Onslow Borough in 1907. For some 30 years, he took, a prominent part in the business and public life of the City of Wellington, being a member of the Chamber of Commerce for 26 years and its President three times in 1907, 1908, and 1918.

He was a member of the Wellington Harbour Board from February 1908 until his death at Midhirst on 9 January 1930. Initially Harkness was the Chamber of Commerce representative on the Board. When the Harbours Act changed the Board he was elected 1911 to represent the payers of harbour dues on goods for two years. He did not stand for re-election, but was appointed Government representative on the board, and held that position up to the time of his death. He was chairman of the Harbour Board from May 1919 to May 1923. As Board Chair, he was a member of the executive of the Harbours Association, and for a time its president.

Harkness was a convinced Prohibitionist and took an active part in the Temperance movement all his life. He was a prominent member of the Masonic fraternity.

He was survived by his wife, four sons, and two daughters.

Political offices
Preceded by Charles Edward Daniell	Chair of Wellington Harbour Board; 1919–1923	Succeeded by George Mitchell
New Zealand Parliament
Preceded by Henry Levestam	Member of Parliament for Nelson; 1889–1893	Succeeded by John Graham
