= 1868 City of Nelson by-election =

New Zealand by-election

The 1868 City of Nelson by-election was a by-election held on 24 December 1868 in the City of Nelson electorate during the 4th New Zealand Parliament.

The by-election was caused by the resignation of the incumbent MP Edward Stafford. The by-election was won by Nathaniel Edwards.

== Results ==
The following table gives the election result:

1868 City of Nelson by-election
Party	Candidate	Votes	%	±%
Independent	Nathaniel Edwards	302	58.53	
Independent	Joseph Shephard	214	41.47	
Turnout		516		
Majority		88	17.05	
