= The Atmore Report, 1930 =

New Zealand parliamentary education document

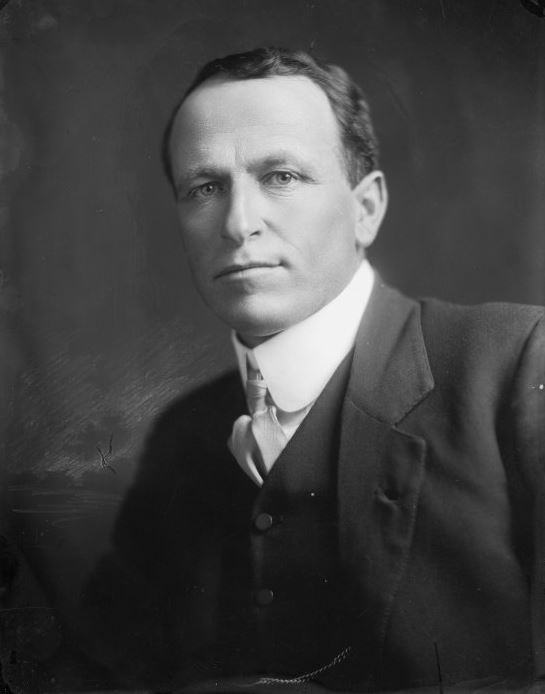
Harry Atmore, who instigated the report

The Atmore Report, 1930 was a parliamentary report into the New Zealand education system which became a landmark document and akin to progressive educationists' charter.

== Parliamentary Recess Education Committee ==
November 1929 saw the appointment of a New Zealand Parliamentary Committee, with a wide range of reference to sit during the recess-the so-called Parliamentary Recess Education Committee-and "consider all matters relating to education and public instruction generally".

The Recess Education Committee's Report was presented in August 1930. The committee recommended that both primary and secondary education should become more practical and less academic; less tethered to examinations. It also proposed that section 10 of the Education Amendment Act 1920 (which would make school attendance compulsory for every child from seven to fifteen) become operative.

== Harry Atmore and the Atmore Report ==
Harry Atmore, the New Zealand Minister of Education, was anxious to realise the policy and ideas set out in the Recess Committee's Report.

Before it appeared in print, Atmore had already sanctioned revision of the primary school syllabus in a manner designed to allow "teachers as much freedom as they are competent to take to organise their teaching in any way that most appeals to them".

== The Depression ==
In September 1931, the progressive Harry Atmore resigned. He was replaced as Minister of Education by Robert Masters who cut expenses to the bone. In the next fifteen months, teachers' salaries were reduced, the school admission age was raised from five to six, and many students left school to assist their parents in the economic crisis.

== Legacy ==
Atmore's plans for creating a new order in the schools had been swamped by the wave of retrenchment of the early 1930s. But Peter Fraser, as Labour's Minister of Education in the later 1930s, supported many of the measures, including making school attendance compulsory from seven to fifteen which occurred in 1944.

The Atmore Report played a crucial role in shaping the New Zealand Education System and is widely regarded as a charter for progressive educationists.

== See also ==
- Education in New Zealand
- History of education in New Zealand
