= Charles Harley =

New Zealand politician

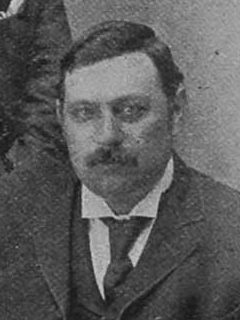

14th Mayor of Nelson
- In office 1915–1917
- Preceded by: William Lock
- Succeeded by: William Snodgrass

Personal details
- Born: Charles John Harley; 10 October 1861 Stoke, New Zealand
- Died: 16 December 1922 (aged 61) Nelson, New Zealand
- Spouse: Janet Ramage Kerr (m. 1884)
- Profession: Barrister and solicitor

Charles John Harley (10 October 1861 – 16 December 1922) was a New Zealand local-body politician. He served as Mayor of Nelson from 1915 to 1917.

== Early life and family ==
Born at Stoke on 10 October 1861, the son of Alfred Harley and his wife Emily Annie Harley (née Cundy), Harley was educated at Nelson College from 1875 to 1878. A barrister and solicitor by profession, he was admitted to the Bar in 1883. Harley married Janet Ramage Kerr the following year. Their son Howard was a marine engineer on the Laurentic when it was sunk in 1917 of the coast of Ireland. Howard survived and joined the Royal Navy Reserve, serving on a cruiser in World War I.

== Businesses ==
Harley was a partner in Adams and Harley and one of the owners of the Tonga Bay Granite Company.

== Local government and civic affairs ==
Harley, a city councillor since the 1890s, defeated William Lock by 1223 votes to 1065 to become Mayor of Nelson in 1915. Despite being pressed by the councilors in 1917 to stand for another term Harley declined. William Snodgrass won the ensuing mayoral election and became the next mayor of Nelson.

Harley was a trustee of the Cawthorn Estate, and a member of the Ancient Order of Foresters.

== Death ==
Harley died at Nelson on 16 December 1922, and was buried at Wakapuaka Cemetery.

Political offices
Preceded by William Lock	Mayor of Nelson; 1915–1917	Succeeded by William Snodgrass
