= Oswald Curtis =

New Zealand politician

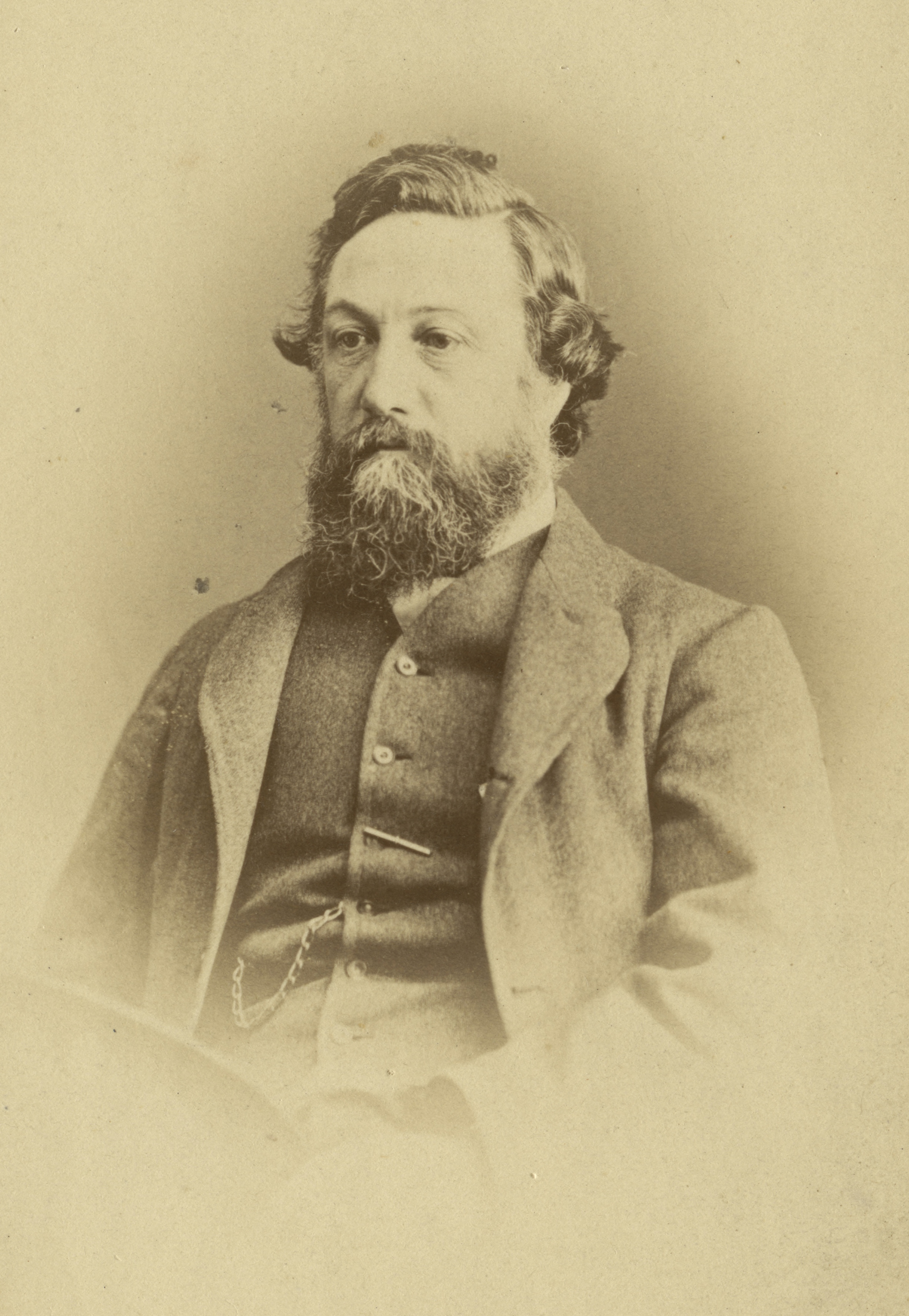

Member of the New Zealand Parliament for City of Nelson
- In office 20 February 1866 – 11 August 1879

Personal details
- Born: 20 January 1821 London, England
- Died: 1 March 1902 (aged 81) Nelson, New Zealand
- Profession: Merchant, politician

Oswald Curtis (20 January 1821 – 1 March 1902) was a 19th-century New Zealand politician born in London, England. He served on the Nelson Provincial Council and became the council's Superintendent for the province's last ten years. In parallel, he represented the City of Nelson electorate in parliament from 1866 to 1879.

== Early life ==
Curtis was born on 20 January 1821 in London. He was the son of Stephen Curtis and Eleanora Llewellyn. Together with his elder brother Herbert, he migrated to Nelson in 1853, arriving on 18 June.

== Mahomed Shah ==
The Curtis brothers had been passengers on the barque Mahomed Shah. The ship sailed from England for New Zealand on 15 January 1853. On 18 April, about 400 nautical miles (740 km; 460 mi) south of Cape Leeuwin, the ship caught fire. All on board were rescued two days later by the brig The Ellen under Captain Pardon. The Ellen was sailing from Mauritius to Hobart, Tasmania. The ship's position was given as 40°10′00″S 119°10′00″E. Those rescued were taken to Hobart, arriving there on 6 May 1853.

== Political career ==
New Zealand Parliament
| Years | Term | Electorate | Party |
|---|---|---|---|
| 1866–1870 | 4th | City of Nelson | Independent |
| 1871–1875 | 5th | City of Nelson | Independent |
| 1875–1879 | 6th | City of Nelson | Independent |

He was a member of the Nelson Provincial Council from 1857 to 1867, becoming its Superintendent in March 1867 when Alfred Saunders resigned. He remained Superintendent until 1876 when the Provinces were abolished. Curtis was also a member of parliament for the City of Nelson from 1866 to 1879, when he was defeated. During his term as a member of Parliament, for one month between 10 September and 11 October 1872 Curtis was Commissioner of Stamps and Customs, Post-Master General and Telegraphs Commissioner under the short-lived third Stafford Ministry.

As Superintendent, Curtis opened the Nelson Waterworks on 16 April 1868 and turned the first sod at Stoke for the cutting of the Nelson–Foxhill Railway on 6 May 1873.

== Community service ==
Curtis had been, at various times, Magistrate, Warden, Coroner, College Governor at Nelson. He was also Fellow of the New Zealand University and held a seat on its senate from 1870 to 1888.

Curtis was also the second President of the Nelson Chamber of Commerce, succeeding Alfred Fell (father of Charles Fell).

He died at his residence Highbury in Nelson on 1 March 1902, aged 81.

== Notes ==
Political offices
| Preceded by Alfred Saunders | Superintendent of Nelson Province; 1867–1876 | Provincial Councils abolished |
| Preceded by Julius Vogel | Postmaster-General; 1872 | Succeeded by Julius Vogel |
| New title | Telegraph Commissioner; 1872 | Succeeded by Julius Vogel |
New Zealand Parliament
| Preceded by Alfred Domett | Member of Parliament for Nelson; 1866–1879; Served alongside: Edward Stafford, Nathaniel Edwards, Martin Lightband, David Luckie, John Sharp, Acton Adams | Succeeded by Albert Pitt |
