= John Sharp (New Zealand politician) =

New Zealand politician

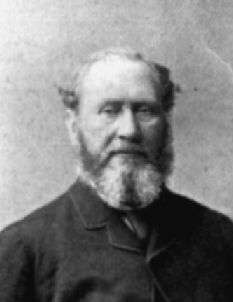
- John Sharp

Member of the New Zealand Parliament
- In office 1875–1879
- Constituency: City of Nelson

Personal details
- Born: 1828 Maidstone, Kent, England
- Died: 4 June 1919 (aged 90–91) Fellworth House, Nelson, New Zealand
- Party: Independent
- Occupation: Politician, magistrate, businessman
- Known for: Mayor of Nelson, MP for City of Nelson

Military service
- Militia service: Corporal, Nelson Militia (1845); later Captain, Nelson Rifles

John Sharp (1828 – 4 June 1919) was a 19th-century Member of Parliament from Nelson, New Zealand and Mayor of Nelson.

== Early life ==
Sharp was born in Maidstone, Kent, England, in 1828. He was educated at Chatham House College, Ramsgate, for the Navy for four years. However, he joined the merchant service. He was an honorary member of Lodge Southern Star, No. 735, E.C., of the New Zealand Freemasons.

== Career ==
In 1843 Sharp migrated to New Zealand in the ship Ursula as clerk to Sir Francis Dillon Bell. Next Sharp became a surveyor for the New Zealand Company. He then received the appointment of assistant clerk to John Tinline, who was clerk to the Superintendent and Resident Magistrate. When Tinline resigned Sharp became clerk. A few months later he was appointed of Registrar of the Supreme Court. A notable trial during this time related to the Maungatapu murders.

When Mr Poynter died, he was appointed Resident Magistrate (1868–1871), Registrar of Deeds, and Deputy Commissioner of Stamps. Sharp held these appointments for three years and then retired.

In 1872 he went into partnership with JA and TH Harley as a co–owner of Kent Breweries. In 1876 he took a controlling share of Nelson's largest brewery, changing its name to The City Brewery. This he sold to Harley and Little. His second business interest was Sharp and Sons, an auctioneering firm.

== Fellworth House ==
Sharp commissioned John Scotland, a local builder and architect to construct a substantial 620 square metre, two-story residence for him and his family in 1876 at a cost of 3,000 pounds.

The house at 193 Milton Street, was named "Fellworth" after an old English family residence. It was constructed from Rimu, Totara, Matai, and Kauri timber, had an English slate tile roof, and African back basalt steps at its main entrance. Following Sharp's death there on 4 June 1919, the house was sold to the Cawthron Trust Board. From 1920 to 1970 the house was transformed into a series of labs, a library, and a museum. It is now privately owned.

Fellworth House is a Category II historic place registered by Heritage New Zealand. It was registered on 25 November 1982 with registration number 1553.

== Political life ==
=== Provincial Council ===
Sharp was representative for Waimea East for two years and then representative for Amuri. He held the position of Provincial Treasurer for three years.

=== Parliament ===
New Zealand Parliament
Years	Term	Electorate	Party
1875–1879	6th	City of Nelson	Independent

He represented the City of Nelson electorate from 1875 to 1879, when he resigned. During Sharp's term in Parliament he enabled Nelson to purchase from the Government the Nelson waterworks and gasworks. The Government had taken these over when the provinces were abolished.

He stood unsuccessfully in the 1889 Nelson by-election.

=== Mayor ===
Sharp was the Mayor of Nelson from 1887 until 1890. He was first elected to replace Charles Fell who had resigned.

== Militia ==
When the war broke out in the North in 1845, and after the destruction of Kororaraka the Governor, Captain FitzRoy, ordered the militia to be called out in Wellington, New Plymouth and Nelson A hundred men were to be balloted for in Nelson and divided into two companies of fifty each.

No 1 Company was under Captain Dr Greenwood, Lieutenant Dr Renwick, Ensign Charles Thorpe of Motueka, and Sergeant, Gibson. No 2 Company was under Captain Dr Monro, Lieutenant, Dillon Bell, Ensign A.L.G. Campbell and Sergeant, Plumbridge. The Nelson militia Adjutant was Major Newcombe, a British Army officer and Quarter-master, Mr Seymour.

Sharp was one of those balloted. He was placed in No 2 Company. Sharp was made a Corporal because he had had four years drill at college. The militia had a fife and drum band. Its leader was Knapp, father of Constable Knapp, of Spring Grove. The drummer was FitzRoy, an old drummer of the Life Guards.

The reveille was at 5.30 am and drill twice daily from 6 am to 8 am and 5 pm to 6 pm so that the men could attend work during the day. The militia later became the Nelson Rifles. Sharp was one of its Captains and later an honorary member.

He was also a volunteer firefighter, a member of the Nelson Bowling Club, and had the reputation as an excellent cricketer.

New Zealand Parliament
Preceded by David Luckie	Member of Parliament for Nelson; 1875–1879; Served alongside: Oswald Curtis	Succeeded by Acton Adams
Political offices
Preceded by Charles Fell	Mayor of Nelson; 1887–1890	Succeeded by Francis Trask
