= Henry Levestam =

New Zealand politician

Henry Augustus Levestam (1833 – 11 February 1889) was a 19th-century Member of Parliament from Nelson, New Zealand.

== Early life ==
He was born in Böel, Schleswig-Holstein, when it was still part of Denmark in 1833, the son of Doctor Arnold Levestam and Henriette Fraenckel. Levestam's grandfather Matthias Levestam was born Moses Salomon Levi. In 1809 he was baptised in Moscow and took a new name.

== Career ==
Levestam served his time at a Copenhagen engineering business. He then moved to London where he continued his mechanical studies. In about 1855 he sailed on the steam ship Lord Ashley as second engineer. The ship was one of the fleet belonging to New Zealand Steam Shipping Company. He was transferred to the Airedale and sailed on her until he settled in Nelson.

He married Elizabeth Hargreaves, the daughter of one of Nelson's pioneer settlers in January 1861. They had eight children, four boys and four girls.

Shortly after his marriage he started the Soho Foundry with Mr Moutray. The partnership dissolved and Levestam established his own engineering concern off Collingwood Street.

== Political career ==
New Zealand Parliament
Years	Term	Electorate	Party
1881	7th	City of Nelson	Independent
1881–1884	8th	Nelson	Independent
1884–1887	9th	Nelson	Independent
1887–1889	10th	Nelson	Independent

In 1881, when Acton Adams resigned due to ill health, Levestam announced his candidature, supporting the Liberals. James Crowe Richmond stood against him, but Levestam won with a substantial majority. He stood again in 1884, defeating Mr Piper. In the 1887 election he was opposed by Messrs Piper and Gibbs, but again was successfully re-elected. Despite English being his second language, Levestam was considered a fluent, although not eloquent, speaker in the house. He was also appreciated for his services by his electorate who, in January 1887, presented him with a purse of sovereigns as testimony of the esteem in which he was held by them.

He represented the City of Nelson electorate from 1881 to his death from a heart attack on 11 February 1889.

== Public service ==
He was noted for listening to the concerns of others and helping those in need. He was a member of the Ancient Order of Foresters and supportive of other friendly societies.

== Death ==
Levestam had been working in his shop on Collingwood Street. He headed home and once there complained of chest pains. He went to bed at 9pm and slept soundly till about 10pm when he awoke and almost immediately was seized with a fainting fit, from which however he recovered consciousness shortly before 11 pm. Levestam asked wife "Where am I". She told him she had sent for the doctor. He replied "Oh don't do that, I am better now" then sank back on his pillow and died.

He was not well off when he died and concern was expressed about his family's financial state.

New Zealand Parliament
Preceded by Acton Adams	Member of Parliament for Nelson; 1881–1889; Served alongside: Albert Pitt	Succeeded by Joseph Harkness
