= Nelson (New Zealand electorate) =

- Single-member general constituency for the New Zealand House of Representatives
- Interactive map of boundaries from the 2026 election
- Formation: 1853
- Region: Nelson
- Character: Urban and suburban
- Term: 3 years

Member for Nelson
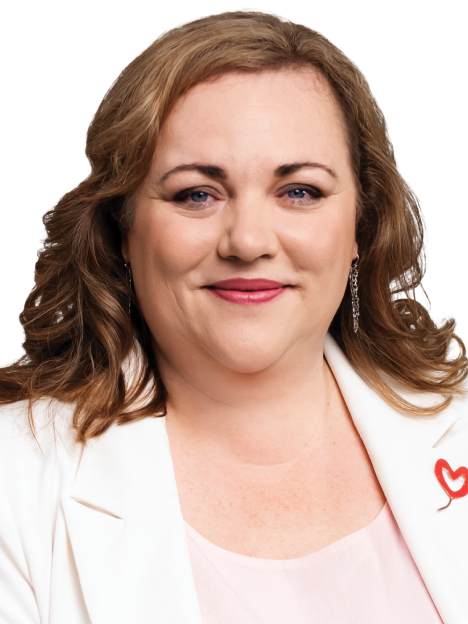
- Rachel Boyack since 17 October 2020
- Party: Labour
- Previous MP: Nick Smith (National)
Party vote distribution

Nelson is a New Zealand parliamentary electorate, returning one Member of Parliament to the House of Representatives of New Zealand. From 1853 to 1860, the electorate was called Town of Nelson. From 1860 to 1881, it was City of Nelson. The electorate is the only one that has continuously existed since the 1st Parliament in 1853.

The current MP for Nelson is Rachel Boyack of the Labour Party after defeating long time incumbent Nick Smith of the National Party in the 2020 general election.

== Population centres ==
Nelson is based around the city of Nelson, with the town of Richmond and the smaller communities of Appleby and Hope to its southwest, and Hira and Cable Bay to its north drafted in to bring the electorate up to the required population quota.

A significant adjustment to the electorate's boundaries was carried out ahead of the change to mixed-member proportional (MMP) voting in 1996; the decrease in South Island electorates from 25 to 16 lead to the abolition of one western South Island electorate; Tasman was split between West Coast and the then (geographically) much smaller Nelson electorate.

Map of boundaries at the 2020 and 2023 general elections

The Representation Commission adjusted the boundaries in the 2007 review, which first applied at the 2008 election; the electorate was not changed in the 2013/14 review. Brightwater was moved to West Coast-Tasman at the 2020 redistribution.

== History ==
An electorate based around Nelson has been contested at every election since the first Parliament in 1853. Two of the original 24 electorates from the 1st Parliament still exist (New Plymouth is the other one), but Nelson is the only original electorate that has existed continuously.

The electorate was initially known as Town of Nelson. From 1866 to 1881, it was called City of Nelson. Since 1881, it has been known as simply Nelson.

From 1853 to 1881, Nelson was a two-member electorate. James Mackay and William Travers were the first two representatives elected in 1853. Travers and William Cautley (MP for Waimea) both resigned on 26 May 1854. Travers subsequently contested the seat that Cautley had vacated, being elected in the 21 June 1854 Waimea by-election. Samuel Stephens, who succeeded Travers in Nelson, died before the end of the first term, but the seat remained vacant.

Alfred Domett retired from politics at the end of the 3rd Parliament. Edward Stafford resigned in 1868 during the term of the 4th Parliament. Nathaniel Edwards won the resulting by-election. Martin Lightband resigned after a year in Parliament in 1872 and was succeeded by David Luckie.

Nelson became a single member electorate in 1881. Henry Levestam, who was first elected in an 1881 by-election to replace Adams was confirmed by the voters at the next three general elections (1881, 1884 and 1887), but he died in office on 11 February 1889.

Joseph Harkness won the resulting 1889 by-election and was confirmed in the 1890 election. He retired at the end of the parliamentary term in 1893 and was succeeded by John Graham, who with the 1893 election started a representation of the electorate that would last until his retirement in 1911.

Harry Atmore an independent Member of Parliament succeeded John Graham in the 1911 election, but he was defeated at the next election in 1914 by Thomas Field of the Reform Party. At the subsequent election in 1919, Atmore defeated Field and represented the electorate until his death on 21 August 1946.

Atmore's death did not cause a by-election, as the 1946 election was held in November of that year. The contest was won by Edgar Neale of the National Party. He held the electorate until 1957, when he retired.

Neale was succeeded by Stan Whitehead of the Labour Party in the 1957 election. This started Labour's dominance in the electorate, which was to last for four decades. Whitehead died on 9 January 1976 in the office and this caused the 1976 by-election, which was won by Labour's Mel Courtney. In the 1981 election, Courtney stood as an independent against Labour's Philip Woollaston, with the latter the successful candidate. Woollaston retired in 1990 and was succeeded by Labour's John Blincoe. When the electorate was enlarged for the 1996 election, it absorbed most of the former seat of Tasman, held by National's Nick Smith. Smith defeated Blincoe and held the seat until the 2020 election, when Labour's Rachel Boyack won the seat.

Despite Smith holding the seat for National from 1996 to 2020, Labour has won the party vote in Nelson in all but three elections during the period (the three elections of the Fifth National Government). Nelson is also an electorate in which the Green Party performs better locally than the party does nationally. Combined, votes at the 2017 election for the Green Party candidate Matt Lawrey and Labour Party candidate Rachel Boyack would have been sufficient to unseat the incumbent Smith.

=== Members of Parliament ===
Key

Independent Conservative Liberal Reform National Labour Green

==== multi-member electorate ====
| Election | Winners | |
|---|---|---|
| 1853 election | James Mackay | William Travers |
| 1854 by-election | James Mackay | Samuel Stephens |
| 1855 election | Alfred Domett | Edward Stafford |
| 1860 election | Alfred Domett | Edward Stafford |
| 1866 election | Oswald Curtis | Edward Stafford |
| 1868 by-election | Oswald Curtis | Nathaniel Edwards |
| 1871 election | Oswald Curtis | Martin Lightband |
| 1872 by-election | Oswald Curtis | David Mitchell Luckie |
| 1875 election | Oswald Curtis | John Sharp |
| 1879 by-election | Oswald Curtis | Acton Adams |
| 1879 election | Albert Pitt | Acton Adams |
| 1881 by-election | Albert Pitt | Henry Levestam |

==== single-member electorate ====
| Election | Winner |
|---|---|
| 1881 election | Henry Levestam |
| 1884 election | Henry Levestam |
| 1887 election | Henry Levestam |
| 1889 by-election | Joseph Harkness |
| 1890 election | Joseph Harkness |
| 1893 election | John Graham |
| 1896 election | John Graham |
| 1899 election | John Graham |
| 1902 election | John Graham |
| 1905 election | John Graham |
| 1908 election | John Graham |
| 1911 election | Harry Atmore |
| 1914 election | Thomas Field |
| 1919 election | Harry Atmore |
| 1922 election | Harry Atmore |
| 1925 election | Harry Atmore |
| 1928 election | Harry Atmore |
| 1931 election | Harry Atmore |
| 1935 election | Harry Atmore |
| 1938 election | Harry Atmore |
| 1943 election | Harry Atmore |
| 1946 election | Edgar Neale |
| 1949 election | Edgar Neale |
| 1951 election | Edgar Neale |
| 1954 election | Edgar Neale |
| 1957 election | Stan Whitehead |
| 1960 election | Stan Whitehead |
| 1963 election | Stan Whitehead |
| 1966 election | Stan Whitehead |
| 1969 election | Stan Whitehead |
| 1972 election | Stan Whitehead |
| 1975 election | Stan Whitehead |
| 1976 by-election | Mel Courtney |
| 1978 election | Mel Courtney |
| 1981 election | Philip Woollaston |
| 1984 election | Philip Woollaston |
| 1987 election | Philip Woollaston |
| 1990 election | John Blincoe |
| 1993 election | John Blincoe |
| 1996 election | Nick Smith |
| 1999 election | Nick Smith |
| 2002 election | Nick Smith |
| 2005 election | Nick Smith |
| 2008 election | Nick Smith |
| 2011 election | Nick Smith |
| 2014 election | Nick Smith |
| 2017 election | Nick Smith |
| 2020 election | Rachel Boyack |
| 2023 election | Rachel Boyack |

=== List MPs ===
Members of Parliament elected from party lists in elections where that person also unsuccessfully contested the Nelson electorate. Unless otherwise stated, all MPs terms began and ended at general elections.

| Election | Winner |
|---|---|
| 2002 election | Mike Ward |
| 2008 election | Maryan Street |
| 2011 election | Maryan Street |
| 2020 election | Chris Baillie |
| 2020 election | Nick Smith (Note: Smith resigned from Parliament on 10 June 2021.) |

== Election results ==
=== 2026 election ===
The next election will be held on 7 November 2026. Candidates for Nelson are listed at Candidates in the 2026 New Zealand general election by electorate § Nelson. Official results will be available after 27 November 2026.

=== 2023 election ===
2023 general election: Nelson
| Notes: | Blue background denotes the winner of the electorate vote. Pink background denotes a candidate elected from their party list. Yellow background denotes an electorate win by a list member, or other incumbent. A ✓ or ✗ denotes status of any incumbent, win or lose respectively. | | | | | | |
| Party | Candidate | Votes | % | ±% | Party votes | % | ±% |
|---|---|---|---|---|---|---|---|
| Labour | ✓ Rachel Boyack | 17,541 | 41.11 | –6.98 | 12,520 | 29.14 | –24.50 |
| National | Blair Cameron | 17,515 | 41.05 | +3.14 | 13,856 | 32.25 | +11.68 |
| Green | Jace Hobbs | 2,791 | 6.54 | +1.98 | 6,154 | 14.33 | +5.31 |
| ACT | Chris Baillie | 2,692 | 6.31 | +3.35 | 4,428 | 10.31 | +2.16 |
| NZ Loyal | Peter Vaughan | 1,316 | 3.08 | | 642 | 1.50 | |
| Progressive Aotearoa | Bruce Dyer | 169 | 0.40 | +0.29 | | | |
| NZ First | | | | | 2,612 | 6.10 | +4.22 |
| Opportunities | | | | | 1,058 | 2.50 | +0.77 |
| Te Pāti Māori | | | | | 343 | 0.80 | +0.60 |
| NewZeal | | | | | 290 | 0.68 | |
| Freedoms NZ | | | | | 263 | 0.61 | |
| Legalise Cannabis | | | | | 187 | 0.44 | +0.12 |
| DemocracyNZ | | | | | 100 | 0.23 | |
| New Conservatives | | | | | 82 | 0.20 | –1.34 |
| Animal Justice | | | | | 75 | 0.18 | |
| Women's Rights | | | | | 50 | 0.12 | |
| Leighton Baker Party | | | | | 31 | 0.07 | |
| New Nation | | | | | 15 | 0.04 | |
| Informal votes | | 646 | | | 254 | | |
| Total valid votes | | 42,670 | | | 42,960 | | |
| Labour hold | Majority | 26 | 0.06 | –10.12 | | | |

=== 2020 election ===
2020 general election: Nelson
| Notes: | Blue background denotes the winner of the electorate vote. Pink background denotes a candidate elected from their party list. Yellow background denotes an electorate win by a list member, or other incumbent. A ✓ or ✗ denotes status of any incumbent, win or lose respectively. | | | | | | |
| Party | Candidate | Votes | % | ±% | Party votes | % | ±% |
|---|---|---|---|---|---|---|---|
| Labour | Rachel Boyack | 21,376 | 48.09 | +17.82 | 23,943 | 53.64 | +12.08 |
| National | ✗ Nick Smith | 16,851 | 37.91 | –2.78 | 9,185 | 20.57 | –18.74 |
| Green | Aaron Stallard | 2,046 | 4.60 | –19.10 | 4,028 | 9.02 | +1.51 |
| ACT | Chris Baillie | 1,320 | 2.96 | +2.59 | 3,639 | 8.15 | +7.82 |
| Opportunities | Matthew Pottinger | 751 | 1.68 | — | 775 | 1.73 | –1.54 |
| Outdoors | Sue Grey | 679 | 1.52 | +0.73 | 173 | 0.38 | +0.24 |
| Advance NZ | Ben Harris | 393 | 0.88 | — | 480 | 1.07 | — |
| New Conservative | Simon Gutschlag | 317 | 0.71 | +0.11 | 690 | 1.54 | +1.03 |
| ONE | Deon Claassens | 111 | 0.24 | — | 180 | 0.40 | — |
| Progressive Aotearoa | Bruce Dyer | 50 | 0.11 | — | | | |
| NZ First | | | | | 841 | 1.88 | –4.63 |
| Legalise Cannabis | | | | | 144 | 0.32 | +0.08 |
| Vision NZ | | | | | 130 | 0.29 | — |
| Māori Party | | | | | 90 | 0.20 | –0.02 |
| Social Credit | | | | | 33 | 0.07 | +0.03 |
| Sustainable NZ | | | | | 17 | 0.03 | — |
| TEA | | | | | 9 | 0.02 | — |
| Heartland | | | | | 2 | 0.01 | — |
| Informal votes | | 554 | | | 276 | | |
| Total valid votes | | 44,448 | | | 44,635 | | |
| Turnout | | 44,635 | | | | | |
| Labour gain from National | Majority | 4,525 | 10.18 | –0.23 | | | |

=== 2017 election ===
2017 general election: Nelson
| Notes: | Blue background denotes the winner of the electorate vote. Pink background denotes a candidate elected from their party list. Yellow background denotes an electorate win by a list member, or other incumbent. A ✓ or ✗ denotes status of any incumbent, win or lose respectively. | | | | | | |
| Party | Candidate | Votes | % | ±% | Party votes | % | ±% |
|---|---|---|---|---|---|---|---|
| National | ✓ Nick Smith | 16,735 | 40.69 | −12.13 | 16,374 | 39.31 | −4.97 |
| Labour | Rachel Boyack | 12,452 | 30.27 | −2.46 | 17,311 | 41.56 | +16.93 |
| Green | Matt Lawrey | 9,746 | 23.70 | +14.59 | 3,130 | 7.51 | −6.59 |
| NZ First | Susan Sara | 1,429 | 3.47 | — | 2,712 | 6.51 | −1.13 |
| Outdoors | David Haynes | 323 | 0.79 | — | 58 | 0.14 | — |
| Conservative | Simon Gutschlag | 246 | 0.60 | −2.37 | 241 | 0.51 | −4.98 |
| ACT | Paul Hufflett | 152 | 0.37 | −0.14 | 137 | 0.33 | −0.07 |
| Money Free | Richard Osmaston | 48 | 0.12 | −0.34 | | | |
| Opportunities | | | | | 1,360 | 3.27 | — |
| Legalise Cannabis | | | | | 99 | 0.24 | −0.29 |
| Ban 1080 | | | | | 97 | 0.23 | −0.78 |
| Māori Party | | | | | 92 | 0.22 | −0.11 |
| United Future | | | | | 23 | 0.06 | −0.19 |
| Democrats | | | | | 15 | 0.04 | −0.08 |
| People's Party | | | | | 14 | 0.03 | — |
| Mana Party | | | | | 9 | 0.02 | −0.62 (Note: 2017 Mana Party swing is relative to the votes for Internet-Mana in 2014; it shared a party list with the Internet Party in the 2014 election) |
| Internet | | | | | 6 | 0.01 | −0.63 (Note: 2017 Internet Party swing is relative to the votes for Internet-Mana in 2014; it shared a party list with Mana Party in the 2014 election) |
| Informal votes | | 390 | | | 151 | | |
| Total valid votes | | 41,131 | | | 41,651 | | |
| Turnout | | 41,802 | | | | | |
| National hold | Majority | 4,283 | 10.41 | −9.67 | | | |

=== 2014 election ===
2014 general election: Nelson
| Notes: | Blue background denotes the winner of the electorate vote. Pink background denotes a candidate elected from their party list. Yellow background denotes an electorate win by a list member, or other incumbent. A ✓ or ✗ denotes status of any incumbent, win or lose respectively. | | | | | | |
| Party | Candidate | Votes | % | ±% | Party votes | % | ±% |
|---|---|---|---|---|---|---|---|
| National | ✓ Nick Smith | 20,000 | 52.82 | −0.32 | 16,904 | 44.28 | −1.13 |
| Labour | Maryan Street | 12,395 | 32.73 | +0.11 | 9,401 | 24.63 | −2.70 |
| Green | Colin Robertson | 3,449 | 9.11 | −0.37 | 5,381 | 14.10 | −1.95 |
| Conservative | John Green | 1,125 | 2.97 | +1.23 | 2,094 | 5.49 | +2.78 |
| ACT | Paul Hufflett | 193 | 0.51 | +0.02 | 151 | 0.40 | −0.33 |
| Money Free | Richard Osmaston | 175 | 0.46 | +0.46 | | | |
| Democrats | Adrian Bayly | 138 | 0.36 | +0.36 | 47 | 0.12 | +0.02 |
| NZ First | | | | | 2,918 | 7.64 | +2.22 |
| Ban 1080 | | | | | 386 | 1.01 | +1.01 |
| Internet Mana | | | | | 317 | 0.83 | +0.64 (Note: 2014 Internet Mana swing is relative to the votes for Mana in 2011; it shared a party list with Internet in the 2014 election.) |
| Legalise Cannabis | | | | | 202 | 0.53 | +0.02 |
| Māori Party | | | | | 125 | 0.33 | −0.13 |
| United Future | | | | | 95 | 0.25 | −0.74 |
| Civilian | | | | | 12 | 0.03 | 0.03 |
| Independent Coalition | | | | | 11 | 0.03 | +0.03 |
| Focus | | | | | 6 | 0.02 | +0.02 |
| Informal votes | | 392 | | | 124 | | |
| Total valid votes | | 37,867 | | | 38,174 | | |
| Turnout | | 38,174 | 79.76 | +4.43 | | | |
| National hold | Majority | 7,605 | 20.08 | −0.44 | | | |

=== 2011 election ===
2011 general election: Nelson
| Notes: | Blue background denotes the winner of the electorate vote. Pink background denotes a candidate elected from their party list. Yellow background denotes an electorate win by a list member, or other incumbent. A ✓ or ✗ denotes status of any incumbent, win or lose respectively. | | | | | | |
| Party | Candidate | Votes | % | ±% | Party votes | % | ±% |
|---|---|---|---|---|---|---|---|
| National | ✓ Nick Smith | 18,360 | 53.14 | –3.99 | 16,016 | 45.41 | +2.96 |
| Labour | Maryan Street | 11,272 | 32.62 | –0.87 | 9,639 | 27.33 | –10.46 |
| Green | Aaryn Barlow | 3,276 | 9.48 | +2.21 | 5,660 | 16.05 | +6.61 |
| NZ First | Kevin Gardener | 669 | 1.94 | +1.94 | 1,913 | 5.42 | +2.38 |
| Conservative | Oliver Vitali | 601 | 1.74 | +1.74 | 954 | 2.71 | +2.71 |
| United Future | Doug Stevens | 204 | 0.59 | +0.21 | 348 | 0.99 | –0.08 |
| ACT | Paul Charles Hufflett | 171 | 0.49 | –0.36 | 259 | 0.73 | –1.75 |
| Legalise Cannabis | | | | | 180 | 0.51 | +0.11 |
| Māori Party | | | | | 161 | 0.46 | –0.05 |
| Mana | | | | | 66 | 0.19 | +0.19 |
| Democrats | | | | | 37 | 0.10 | +0.04 |
| Libertarianz | | | | | 20 | 0.06 | +0.02 |
| Alliance | | | | | 14 | 0.04 | –0.08 |
| Informal votes | | 692 | | | 250 | | |
| Total valid votes | | 34,553 | | | 35,267 | | |
| National hold | Majority | 7,088 | 20.52 | –3.13 | | | |

Electorate (as at 26 November 2011): 46,817

=== 2008 election ===
2008 general election: Nelson
| Notes: | Blue background denotes the winner of the electorate vote. Pink background denotes a candidate elected from their party list. Yellow background denotes an electorate win by a list member, or other incumbent. A ✓ or ✗ denotes status of any incumbent, win or lose respectively. | | | | | | |
| Party | Candidate | Votes | % | ±% | Party votes | % | ±% |
|---|---|---|---|---|---|---|---|
| National | ✓ Nick Smith | 20,471 | 57.13 | +1.41 | 15,378 | 42.46 | +5.45 |
| Labour | Maryan Street | 12,000 | 33.49 | +5.84 | 13,689 | 37.79 | –5.17 |
| Green | Diana Mellor | 2,605 | 7.27 | –4.45 | 3,417 | 9.43 | +1.69 |
| Kiwi | Robin Westley | 312 | 0.87 | | 256 | 0.71 | |
| ACT | Paul Hufflett | 306 | 0.85 | +0.45 | 900 | 2.48 | +1.43 |
| United Future | Kelvin Deal | 138 | 0.39 | –1.17 | 387 | 1.07 | –2.43 |
| NZ First | | | | | 1,104 | 3.05 | –1.28 |
| Progressive | | | | | 282 | 0.78 | –0.35 |
| Bill and Ben | | | | | 209 | 0.58 | |
| Māori Party | | | | | 184 | 0.51 | +0.27 |
| Family Party | | | | | 160 | 0.44 | |
| Legalise Cannabis | | | | | 144 | 0.40 | +0.12 |
| Alliance | | | | | 42 | 0.12 | +0.03 |
| Democrats | | | | | 24 | 0.07 | ±0.00 |
| Workers Party | | | | | 13 | 0.04 | |
| Libertarianz | | | | | 12 | 0.03 | +0.01 |
| Pacific | | | | | 11 | 0.03 | |
| RONZ | | | | | 5 | 0.01 | ±0.00 |
| RAM | | | | | 3 | 0.01 | |
| Informal votes | | 241 | | | 115 | | |
| Total valid votes | | 35,832 | | | 36,220 | | |
| Turnout | | 36,548 | 81.77 | –1.00 | | | |
| National hold | Majority | 8,471 | 23.64 | –4.43 | | | |

=== 2005 election ===
2005 general election: Nelson
| Notes: | Blue background denotes the winner of the electorate vote. Pink background denotes a candidate elected from their party list. Yellow background denotes an electorate win by a list member, or other incumbent. A ✓ or ✗ denotes status of any incumbent, win or lose respectively. | | | | | | |
| Party | Candidate | Votes | % | ±% | Party votes | % | ±% |
|---|---|---|---|---|---|---|---|
| National | ✓ Nick Smith | 20,299 | 55.72 | +8.45 | 13,619 | 37.01 | +17.68 |
| Labour | Jen McCutcheon | 10,073 | 27.65 | –6.94 | 15,809 | 42.96 | –1.96 |
| Green | Mike Ward | 4,269 | 11.72 | –0.51 | 2,848 | 7.74 | –1.18 |
| United Future | Dennis Wells | 568 | 1.56 | –0.72 | 1,289 | 3.50 | –3.18 |
| Destiny | Jason Thomson | 383 | 1.05 | | 361 | 0.98 | |
| Progressive | Jacqueline McAlpine | 252 | 0.69 | +0.06 | 417 | 1.13 | –0.18 |
| Christian Heritage | Nick Barber | 209 | 0.57 | –1.33 | 141 | 0.38 | –1.48 |
| Māori Party | Anne Fitzsimon | 165 | 0.45 | | 89 | 0.24 | |
| ACT | Mike Heine | 144 | 0.40 | | 388 | 1.05 | –2.94 |
| Direct Democracy | Rex Newey | 67 | 0.18 | | 50 | 0.14 | |
| NZ First | | | | | 1,593 | 4.33 | –2.04 |
| Legalise Cannabis | | | | | 104 | 0.28 | –0.29 |
| Alliance | | | | | 33 | 0.09 | –1.09 |
| Democrats | | | | | 24 | 0.07 | |
| One NZ | | | | | 11 | 0.03 | –0.06 |
| Libertarianz | | | | | 9 | 0.02 | |
| Family Rights | | | | | 7 | 0.02 | |
| 99 MP | | | | | 6 | 0.02 | |
| RONZ | | | | | 4 | 0.01 | ±0.00 |
| Informal votes | | 260 | | | 113 | | |
| Total valid votes | | 36,429 | | | 36,802 | | |
| Turnout | | 37,052 | 82.77 | +3.19 | | | |
| National hold | Majority | 10,226 | 28.07 | +15.39 | | | |

=== 2002 election ===
2002 general election: Nelson
| Notes: | Blue background denotes the winner of the electorate vote. Pink background denotes a candidate elected from their party list. Yellow background denotes an electorate win by a list member, or other incumbent. A ✓ or ✗ denotes status of any incumbent, win or lose respectively. | | | | | | |
| Party | Candidate | Votes | % | ±% | Party votes | % | ±% |
|---|---|---|---|---|---|---|---|
| National | ✓ Nick Smith | 15,779 | 47.27 | +2.49 | 6,517 | 19.33 | –7.70 |
| Labour | John Kennedy | 11,547 | 34.59 | +2.83 | 15,149 | 44.92 | +4.30 |
| Green | Mike Ward | 4,084 | 12.23 | +2.10 | 3,008 | 8.92 | +0.78 |
| United Future | Dennis Wells | 762 | 2.28 | | 2,254 | 6.68 | +5.68^{a} |
| Christian Heritage | Nick Barber | 635 | 1.90 | –1.20 | 628 | 1.86 | –2.80 |
| Alliance | Mary O'Connor | 364 | 1.09 | –6.13 | 398 | 1.18 | –7.74 |
| Progressive | Adrian Bayly | 211 | 0.63 | | 441 | 1.31 | |
| NZ First | | | | | 2,147 | 6.37 | +4.27 |
| ORNZ | | | | | 1,602 | 4.75 | |
| ACT | | | | | 1,346 | 3.99 | –1.52 |
| Legalise Cannabis | | | | | 193 | 0.57 | –0.13 |
| One NZ | | | | | 30 | 0.09 | –0.01 |
| NMP | | | | | 5 | 0.01 | –0.08 |
| RONZ | | | | | 4 | 0.01 | |
| Mana Māori | | | | | 3 | 0.01 | ±0.00 |
| Informal votes | | 286 | | | 115 | | |
| Total valid votes | | 33,382 | | | 33,721 | | |
| Turnout | | 33,923 | 79.58 | | | | |
| National hold | Majority | 4,232 | 12.68 | –0.35 | | | |

^{a} United Future swing is compared to the 1999 results of United NZ and Future NZ, who merged in 2000.

=== 1999 election ===
1999 general election: Nelson
| Notes: | Blue background denotes the winner of the electorate vote. Pink background denotes a candidate elected from their party list. Yellow background denotes an electorate win by a list member, or other incumbent. A ✓ or ✗ denotes status of any incumbent, win or lose respectively. | | | | | | |
| Party | Candidate | Votes | % | ±% | Party votes | % | ±% |
|---|---|---|---|---|---|---|---|
| National | ✓ Nick Smith | 15,542 | 44.78 | | 9,419 | 27.03 | |
| Labour | Simon Fraser | 11,021 | 31.76 | | 14,154 | 40.62 | |
| Green | Mike Ward | 3,516 | 10.13 | | 2,835 | 8.14 | |
| Alliance | Mary O'Connor | 2,505 | 7.22 | | 3,108 | 8.92 | |
| Christian Heritage | Nick Barber | 1,077 | 3.10 | | 1,624 | 4.66 | |
| ACT | Philip Gully | 461 | 1.33 | | 1,920 | 5.51 | |
| NZ First | Trevor Squires | 296 | 0.85 | | 732 | 2.10 | |
| McGillicuddy Serious | Tim Owens | 223 | 0.64 | | 95 | 0.27 | |
| NMP | Suzanne Johnston | 64 | 0.18 | | 32 | 0.09 | |
| Legalise Cannabis | | | | | 278 | 0.80 | |
| Christian Democrats | | | | | 216 | 0.62 | |
| United NZ | | | | | 131 | 0.38 | |
| Libertarianz | | | | | 114 | 0.33 | |
| South Island | | | | | 67 | 0.19 | |
| Animals First | | | | | 51 | 0.15 | |
| One NZ | | | | | 34 | 0.10 | |
| Natural Law | | | | | 14 | 0.04 | |
| Mana Māori | | | | | 5 | 0.01 | |
| People's Choice | | | | | 5 | 0.01 | |
| Freedom Movement | | | | | 4 | 0.01 | |
| Mauri Pacific | | | | | 4 | 0.01 | |
| Republican | | | | | 3 | 0.01 | |
| Informal votes | | 485 | | | 345 | | |
| Total valid votes | | 34,705 | | | 34,845 | | |
| National hold | Majority | 4,521 | 13.03 | | | | |

=== 1996 election ===
1996 general election: Nelson
| Notes: | Blue background denotes the winner of the electorate vote. Pink background denotes a candidate elected from their party list. Yellow background denotes an electorate win by a list member, or other incumbent. A ✓ or ✗ denotes status of any incumbent, win or lose respectively. | | | | | | |
| Party | Candidate | Votes | % | ±% | Party votes | % | ±% |
|---|---|---|---|---|---|---|---|
| National | Nick Smith | 20,481 | 59.22 | | 10,652 | 30.78 | |
| Labour | ✗ John Blincoe | 8,057 | 23.30 | | 11,012 | 31.82 | |
| Alliance | Mike Ward | 3,171 | 9.17 | | 4,220 | 12.20 | |
| NZ First | Bernard Downey | 1,510 | 4.37 | | 3,417 | 9.88 | |
| Christian Coalition | Nick Barber | 749 | 2.17 | | 2,206 | 6.38 | |
| McGillicuddy Serious | Tim Owens | 279 | 0.81 | | 187 | 0.54 | |
| ACT | Merv Randle | 251 | 0.73 | | 1,900 | 5.49 | |
| Natural Law | Michelle McGregor | 86 | 0.25 | | 59 | 0.17 | |
| Legalise Cannabis | | | | | 464 | 1.34 | |
| United NZ | | | | | 230 | 0.66 | |
| Progressive Green | | | | | 94 | 0.27 | |
| Animals First | | | | | 62 | 0.18 | |
| Green Society | | | | | 26 | 0.08 | |
| Asia Pacific United | | | | | 21 | 0.06 | |
| Superannuitants & Youth | | | | | 14 | 0.04 | |
| Libertarianz | | | | | 13 | 0.04 | |
| Advance New Zealand | | | | | 7 | 0.02 | |
| Conservatives | | | | | 7 | 0.02 | |
| Mana Māori | | | | | 6 | 0.02 | |
| Ethnic Minority Party | | | | | 4 | 0.01 | |
| Te Tawharau | | | | | 1 | 0.00 | |
| Informal votes | | 165 | | | 147 | | |
| Total valid votes | | 34,584 | | | 34,602 | | |
| National gain from Labour | Majority | 12,424 | 35.92 | | | | |

=== 1993 election ===
1993 general election: Nelson
| Party | Candidate | Votes | % | ±% |
|---|---|---|---|---|
| Labour | John Blincoe | 8,779 | 33.14 | –11.06 |
| National | Margaret Emerre | 6,772 | 25.56 | |
| Alliance | Mike Ward | 4,543 | 17.15 | +8.37 |
| NZ First | Bernard Downey | 1,039 | 3.92 | |
| Christian Heritage | Nick Barber | 746 | 2.81 | |
| Natural Law | Virginia Ward-Brown | 131 | 0.49 | |
| Majority | | 2,007 | 7.57 | +4.50 |
| Turnout | | 22,010 | 83.10 | –1.12 |
| Registered electors | | 26,486 | | |

=== 1990 election ===
1990 general election: Nelson
| Party | Candidate | Votes | % | ±% |
|---|---|---|---|---|
| Labour | John Blincoe | 9,142 | 44.20 | |
| National | Liz Baigent | 8,506 | 41.12 | |
| Green | Mike Ward | 1,816 | 8.78 | +6.40 |
| NewLabour | Ian Hatton | 851 | 4.11 | |
| Social Credit | Keith Taylor | 152 | 0.73 | |
| Democrats | Jack Collin | 124 | 0.59 | –1.41 |
| McGillicuddy Serious | Murray Kingi | 90 | 0.43 | |
| Majority | | 636 | 3.07 | |
| Turnout | | 20,681 | 84.22 | –4.05 |
| Registered electors | | 24,554 | | |

=== 1987 election ===
1987 general election: Nelson
| Party | Candidate | Votes | % | ±% |
|---|---|---|---|---|
| Labour | Philip Woollaston | 11,975 | 57.88 | +10.16 |
| National | Bob Straight | 6,508 | 31.45 | +18.59 |
| Independent | Nick Barber | 1,227 | 5.93 | |
| Values | Mike Ward | 494 | 2.38 | +1.37 |
| Democrats | Jack Collin | 415 | 2.00 | +0.53 |
| Independent | M Hackman | 69 | 0.33 | |
| Majority | | 5,467 | 26.42 | +9.36 |
| Turnout | | 20,688 | 88.27 | –4.55 |
| Registered electors | | 23,436 | | |

=== 1984 election ===
1984 general election: Nelson
| Party | Candidate | Votes | % | ±% |
|---|---|---|---|---|
| Labour | Philip Woollaston | 10,288 | 47.72 | +7.31 |
| Independent | Mel Courtney | 6,610 | 30.66 | –6.31 |
| National | Bob Straight | 2,773 | 12.86 | |
| NZ Party | Inga Jimenez | 1,348 | 6.25 | |
| Social Credit | Jack Collin | 318 | 1.47 | |
| Values | Mike Ward | 219 | 1.01 | –0.45 |
| Majority | | 3,678 | 17.06 | +13.62 |
| Turnout | | 21,556 | 92.82 | +1.79 |
| Registered electors | | 23,222 | | |

=== 1981 election ===
1981 general election: Nelson
| Party | Candidate | Votes | % | ±% |
|---|---|---|---|---|
| Labour | Philip Woollaston | 8,198 | 40.41 | |
| Independent | Mel Courtney | 7,500 | 36.97 | –13.49 |
| National | Gaire Thompson | 2,749 | 13.55 | |
| Social Credit | Neville McLean | 1,545 | 7.61 | |
| Values | Mike Ward | 297 | 1.46 | |
| Majority | | 698 | 3.44 | |
| Turnout | | 20,289 | 91.03 | +14.47 |
| Registered electors | | 22,288 | | |

=== 1978 election ===
1978 general election: Nelson
| Party | Candidate | Votes | % | ±% |
|---|---|---|---|---|
| Labour | Mel Courtney | 9,605 | 50.46 | +2.28 |
| National | Peter Malone | 7,366 | 38.70 | –0.87 |
| Social Credit | D C Massey | 1,506 | 7.91 | |
| Values | Ann Lawn | 556 | 2.92 | |
| Majority | | 2,239 | 11.76 | +3.15 |
| Turnout | | 19,033 | 76.56 | –2.47 |
| Registered electors | | 24,860 | | |

=== 1976 by-election ===
1976 Nelson by-election
| Party | Candidate | Votes | % | ±% |
|---|---|---|---|---|
| Labour | Mel Courtney | 8,418 | 48.18 | |
| National | Peter Malone | 6,913 | 39.57 | |
| Values | Gwen Struik | 1,583 | 9.06 | +2.43 |
| Social Credit | Rudolf Muller | 452 | 2.58 | |
| Imperial British Conservative | Coronita Weallens | 38 | 0.21 | |
| Informal votes | | 66 | 0.37 | |
| Majority | | 1,505 | 8.61 | |
| Turnout | | 17,470 | 79.03 | –6.91 |
| Registered electors | | 22,105 | | |
| Labour hold | | Swing | | |

=== 1975 election ===
1975 general election: Nelson
| Party | Candidate | Votes | % | ±% |
|---|---|---|---|---|
| Labour | Stan Whitehead | 8,705 | 46.95 | –3.03 |
| National | Ian McWhannell | 7,612 | 41.05 | +2.87 |
| Values | Gwen Struik | 1,231 | 6.63 | |
| Social Credit | Colin Nicholls | 992 | 5.35 | |
| Majority | | 1,093 | 5.89 | –5.90 |
| Turnout | | 18,540 | 85.94 | –3.40 |
| Registered electors | | 21,571 | | |

=== 1972 election ===
1972 general election: Nelson
| Party | Candidate | Votes | % | ±% |
|---|---|---|---|---|
| Labour | Stan Whitehead | 8,189 | 49.98 | +2.35 |
| National | Ian McWhannell | 6,256 | 38.18 | |
| Values | Alan Stanton | 736 | 4.49 | |
| Social Credit | Archie Mahan | 715 | 4.36 | |
| New Democratic | John O'Brien | 487 | 2.97 | |
| Majority | | 1,933 | 11.79 | –4.07 |
| Turnout | | 16,383 | 89.34 | –0.28 |
| Registered electors | | 18,337 | | |

=== 1969 election ===
1969 general election: Nelson
| Party | Candidate | Votes | % | ±% |
|---|---|---|---|---|
| Labour | Stan Whitehead | 7,693 | 47.63 | +1.23 |
| National | Roy McLennan | 6,445 | 39.90 | |
| Social Credit | Keith Martin | 2,013 | 12.46 | |
| Majority | | 1,248 | 7.72 | –4.48 |
| Turnout | | 16,151 | 89.26 | +1.83 |
| Registered electors | | 18,094 | | |

=== 1966 election ===
1966 general election: Nelson
| Party | Candidate | Votes | % | ±% |
|---|---|---|---|---|
| Labour | Stan Whitehead | 7,777 | 46.40 | –7.04 |
| National | Edwin Slack | 5,732 | 34.20 | |
| Social Credit | Colin Nicholls | 3,250 | 19.39 | –10.04 |
| Majority | | 2,045 | 12.20 | –4.03 |
| Turnout | | 16,759 | 87.43 | –2.61 |
| Registered electors | | 19,167 | | |

=== 1963 election ===
1963 general election: Nelson
| Party | Candidate | Votes | % | ±% |
|---|---|---|---|---|
| Labour | Stan Whitehead | 8,590 | 53.44 | +1.80 |
| National | Peter Malone | 5,980 | 37.20 | |
| Social Credit | Colin Nicholls | 1,503 | 9.35 | |
| Majority | | 2,610 | 16.23 | +5.52 |
| Turnout | | 16,073 | 90.04 | –2.91 |
| Registered electors | | 17,849 | | |

=== 1960 election ===
1960 general election: Nelson
| Party | Candidate | Votes | % | ±% |
|---|---|---|---|---|
| Labour | Stan Whitehead | 8,519 | 51.64 | +3.63 |
| National | Colin Wilson Martin | 6,752 | 40.93 | –3.86 |
| Social Credit | Archie Mahan | 1,223 | 7.41 | |
| Majority | | 1,767 | 10.71 | +7.50 |
| Turnout | | 16,494 | 92.95 | –1.30 |
| Registered electors | | 17,745 | | |

=== 1957 election ===
1957 general election: Nelson
| Party | Candidate | Votes | % | ±% |
|---|---|---|---|---|
| Labour | Stan Whitehead | 7,592 | 48.01 | +6.97 |
| National | Colin Wilson Martin | 7,083 | 44.79 | |
| Social Credit | C Toomer | 1,138 | 7.19 | |
| Majority | | 509 | 3.21 | |
| Turnout | | 15,813 | 94.25 | +1.42 |
| Registered electors | | 16,777 | | |

=== 1954 election ===
1954 general election: Nelson
| Party | Candidate | Votes | % | ±% |
|---|---|---|---|---|
| National | Edgar Neale | 7,058 | 45.67 | –13.16 |
| Labour | Stan Whitehead | 6,341 | 41.04 | –0.13 |
| Social Credit | K S Taylor | 2,055 | 13.29 | |
| Majority | | 717 | 4.63 | –13.04 |
| Turnout | | 15,454 | 92.83 | +3.12 |
| Registered electors | | 16,646 | | |

=== 1951 election ===
1951 general election: Nelson
| Party | Candidate | Votes | % | ±% |
|---|---|---|---|---|
| National | Edgar Neale | 9,425 | 58.83 | +4.40 |
| Labour | Stan Whitehead | 6,594 | 41.17 | |
| Majority | | 2,831 | 17.67 | +8.80 |
| Turnout | | 16,019 | 89.71 | –5.25 |
| Registered electors | | 17,856 | | |

=== 1949 election ===
1949 general election: Nelson
| Party | Candidate | Votes | % | ±% |
|---|---|---|---|---|
| National | Edgar Neale | 8,420 | 54.43 | +2.34 |
| Labour | Reynell Conrad Arthur Marshall | 7,047 | 45.57 | |
| Majority | | 1,373 | 8.87 | +4.68 |
| Turnout | | 15,467 | 94.96 | +1.34 |
| Registered electors | | 16,287 | | |

=== 1946 election ===
1946 general election: Nelson
| Party | Candidate | Votes | % | ±% |
|---|---|---|---|---|
| National | Edgar Neale | 7,265 | 52.09 | –2.34 |
| Labour | Cyril Harold Goodman | 6,680 | 47.91 | |
| Majority | | 585 | 4.19 | |
| Turnout | | 13,945 | 93.62 | –2.28 |
| Registered electors | | 14,894 | | |

=== 1943 election ===
1943 general election: Nelson
| Party | Candidate | Votes | % | ±% |
|---|---|---|---|---|
| Independent | Harry Atmore | 6,051 | 50.46 | –3.25 |
| National | Frederick William Huggins | 5,860 | 48.87 | |
| Informal votes | | 79 | 0.65 | +0.25 |
| Majority | | 191 | 1.59 | –6.22 |
| Turnout | | 11,990 | 95.90 | +1.18 |
| Registered electors | | 12,502 | | |

=== 1938 election ===
1938 general election: Nelson
| Party | Candidate | Votes | % | ±% |
|---|---|---|---|---|
| Independent | Harry Atmore | 6,092 | 53.71 | –8.72 |
| National | John Robert Kerr | 5,206 | 45.89 | |
| Informal votes | | 46 | 0.40 | –0.21 |
| Majority | | 886 | 7.81 | –17.06 |
| Turnout | | 11,344 | 94.72 | +1.81 |
| Registered electors | | 11,976 | | |

=== 1935 election ===
1935 general election: Nelson
| Party | Candidate | Votes | % | ±% |
|---|---|---|---|---|
| Independent | Harry Atmore | 6,552 | 62.43 | +11.90 |
| Reform | Herbert Everett | 3,942 | 37.56 | –11.91 |
| Informal votes | | 65 | 0.61 | +0.03 |
| Majority | | 2,610 | 24.87 | +23.81 |
| Turnout | | 10,494 | 92.91 | +3.33 |
| Registered electors | | 11,294 | | |

=== 1931 election ===
1931 general election: Nelson
| Party | Candidate | Votes | % | ±% |
|---|---|---|---|---|
| Independent | Harry Atmore | 4,749 | 50.53 | –12.44 |
| Reform | Herbert Everett | 4,649 | 49.47 | |
| Majority | | 100 | 1.06 | –24.89 |
| Informal votes | | 55 | 0.58 | –0.91 |
| Turnout | | 9,453 | 89.18 | +0.09 |
| Registered electors | | 10,600 | | |

=== 1928 election ===
1928 general election: Nelson
| Party | Candidate | Votes | % | ±% |
|---|---|---|---|---|
| Independent | Harry Atmore | 5,603 | 62.98 | +4.65 |
| Reform | Frederick William Oscar Smith | 3,294 | 37.02 | |
| Majority | | 2,309 | 25.95 | –3.08 |
| Informal votes | | 135 | 1.49 | |
| Turnout | | 9,032 | 89.09 | +3.56 |
| Registered electors | | 10,138 | | |

=== 1925 election ===
1925 general election: Nelson
| Party | Candidate | Votes | % | ±% |
|---|---|---|---|---|
| Independent | Harry Atmore | 4,721 | 58.33 | –4.24 |
| Reform | Albert Gilbert | 2,372 | 29.31 | –7.09 |
| Labour | Tom Brindle | 1,000 | 12.36 | |
| Majority | | 2,349 | 29.03 | +2.86 |
| Turnout | | 8,093 | 85.53 | –7.28 |
| Registered electors | | 9,462 | | |

=== 1922 election ===
1922 general election: Nelson
| Party | Candidate | Votes | % | ±% |
|---|---|---|---|---|
| Independent | Harry Atmore | 5,174 | 62.57 | +23.36 |
| Reform | Albert Gilbert | 3,010 | 36.40 | |
| Informal votes | | 85 | 1.02 | –0.50 |
| Majority | | 2,164 | 26.17 | +20.31 |
| Turnout | | 8,269 | 92.81 | +6.89 |
| Registered electors | | 8,909 | | |

=== 1919 election ===
1919 general election: Nelson
| Party | Candidate | Votes | % | ±% |
|---|---|---|---|---|
| Independent | Harry Atmore | 3,412 | 39.21 | –10.12 |
| Reform | Thomas Field | 2,902 | 33.35 | –17.31 |
| Labour | John George Price | 1,079 | 12.40 | |
| Informal votes | | 46 | 0.52 | –0.59 |
| Majority | | 510 | 5.86 | |
| Turnout | | 7,476 | 85.92 | –0.49 |
| Registered electors | | 8,701 | | |

=== 1914 election ===
1914 general election: Nelson
| Party | Candidate | Votes | % | ±% |
|---|---|---|---|---|
| Reform | Thomas Field | 3,406 | 50.66 | |
| Independent | Harry Atmore | 3,316 | 49.33 | –13.58 |
| Informal votes | | 75 | 1.11 | +0.86 |
| Majority | | 90 | 1.33 | |
| Turnout | | 6,722 | 86.41 | +8.30 |
| Registered electors | | 7,779 | | |

=== 1911 election ===
1911 general election: Nelson, first ballot
| Party | Candidate | Votes | % | ±% |
|---|---|---|---|---|
| Independent | Harry Atmore | 2,865 | 47.44 | –2.35 |
| Independent Liberal | Walter Moffatt | 1,371 | 22.70 | |
| Liberal | George McMahon | 800 | 13.24 | |
| Conservative | William Spencer Hampson | 570 | 9.44 | |
| Conservative | George Bishop | 379 | 6.27 | |
| Informal votes | | 53 | 0.87 | –0.70 |
| Majority | | 1,494 | 24.74 | |
| Turnout | | 6,038 | 81.19 | +2.13 |
Second ballot result
| Independent | Harry Atmore | 3,655 | 62.91 | +15.47 |
| Independent Liberal | Walter Moffatt | 2,139 | 36.82 | +14.12 |
| Informal votes | | 15 | 0.25 | –0.62 |
| Majority | | 1,516 | 26.09 | +1.35 |
| Turnout | | 5,809 | 78.11 | –3.08 |

=== 1908 election ===
1908 general election: Nelson, first ballot
| Party | Candidate | Votes | % | ±% |
|---|---|---|---|---|
| Liberal | John Graham | 2,906 | 48.53 | –1.05 |
| Independent | Harry Atmore | 2,712 | 45.29 | –4.50 |
| Independent Liberal | Walter Moffatt | 316 | 5.27 | |
| Informal votes | | 53 | 0.88 | –0.47 |
| Majority | | 194 | 3.24 | +2.73 |
| Turnout | | 5,987 | 81.77 | +6.93 |
Second ballot result
| Liberal | John Graham | 2,896 | 50.03 | +1.50 |
| Independent | Harry Atmore | 2,882 | 49.79 | +4.50 |
| Informal votes | | 10 | 0.17 | –0.30 |
| Majority | | 14 | 0.24 | –3.00 |
| Turnout | | 5,788 | 79.06 | –2.71 |

=== 1905 election ===
1905 general election: Nelson
| Party | Candidate | Votes | % | ±% |
|---|---|---|---|---|
| Liberal | John Graham | 2,787 | 49.58 | –0.44 |
| Independent | Harry Atmore | 2,758 | 49.06 | +11.18 |
| Informal votes | | 76 | 1.35 | |
| Majority | | 29 | 0.51 | –11.62 |
| Turnout | | 5,621 | 88.70 | +10.58 |
| Registered electors | | 6,337 | | |

=== 1902 election ===
1902 general election: Nelson
| Party | Candidate | Votes | % | ±% |
|---|---|---|---|---|
| Liberal | John Graham | 2,156 | 50.02 | +6.41 |
| Independent | Harry Atmore | 1,633 | 37.88 | |
| Independent Liberal | Jesse Piper | 521 | 12.08 | |
| Majority | | 523 | 12.13 | –0.72 |
| Turnout | | 4,310 | 78.12 | –6.10 |
| Registered electors | | 5,517 | | |

=== 1899 election ===
1899 general election: Nelson
| Party | Candidate | Votes | % | ±% |
|---|---|---|---|---|
| Liberal | John Graham | 2,551 | 56.43 | +1.89 |
| Conservative | Richmond Hursthouse | 1,970 | 43.57 | |
| Majority | | 581 | 12.85 | +3.77 |
| Turnout | | 4,521 | 84.22 | +3.15 |
| Registered electors | | 5,368 | | |

=== 1890 election ===
1890 general election: Nelson
| Party | Candidate | Votes | % | ±% |
|---|---|---|---|---|
| Conservative | Joseph Harkness | 672 | 47.22 | |
| Liberal | John Kerr | 657 | 46.17 | |
| Liberal | Francis William Flowerday | 94 | 6.60 | |
| Majority | | 15 | 1.05 | |
| Turnout | | 1,423 | 77.71 | |
| Registered electors | | 1,831 | | |

=== 1889 by-election ===
1889 Nelson by-election
| Party | Candidate | Votes | % | ±% |
|---|---|---|---|---|
| Independent | Joseph Harkness | 659 | 57.86 | |
| Independent | John Sharp | 480 | 42.14 | |
| Majority | | 179 | 15.72 | |
| Turnout | | 1139 | | |

=== 1881 by-election ===
1881 City of Nelson by-election
| Party | Candidate | Votes | % | ±% |
|---|---|---|---|---|
| Independent | Henry Levestam | 438 | 51.83 | |
| Independent | James Crowe Richmond | 407 | 48.17 | |
| Turnout | | 845 | | |
| Majority | | 31 | 3.67 | |

=== 1879 by-election ===
1879 City of Nelson by-election
| Party | Candidate | Votes | % | ±% |
|---|---|---|---|---|
| Independent | Acton Adams | 369 | 61.3 | |
| Independent | Albert Pitt | 252 | 38.7 | |
| Turnout | | 119 | | |
| Majority | | 27 | | |

=== 1872 by-election ===
1872 City of Nelson by-election
| Party | Candidate | Votes | % | ±% |
|---|---|---|---|---|
| Independent | David Luckie | 307 | 57.17 | |
| Independent | James Crowe Richmond | 156 | 29.05 | |
| Independent | Alfred Saunders | 74 | 13.78 | |
| Turnout | | 537 | | |
| Majority | | 151 | 28.12 | |

=== 1868 by-election ===
1868 City of Nelson by-election
| Party | Candidate | Votes | % | ±% |
|---|---|---|---|---|
| Independent | Nathaniel Edwards | 302 | 58.53 | |
| Independent | Joseph Shephard | 214 | 41.47 | |
| Turnout | | 516 | | |
| Majority | | 88 | 17.05 | |
