= Harry Atmore =

New Zealand politician

The Honourable Harry Atmore
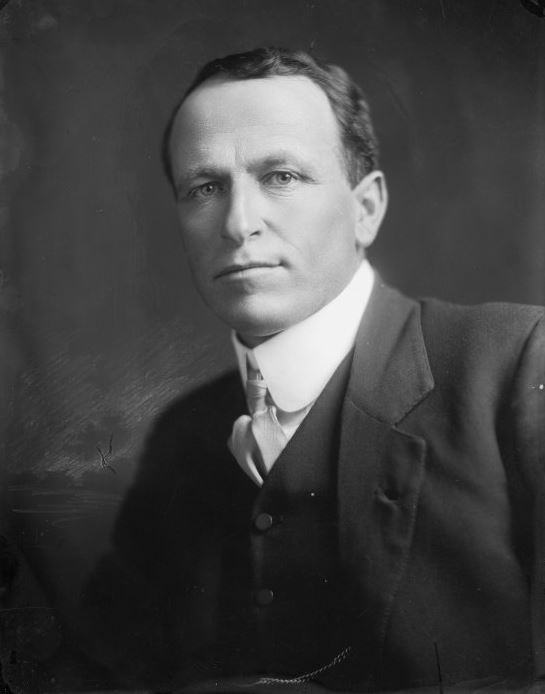
- Atmore in 1911

19th Minister of Education
- In office 10 December 1928 – 22 September 1931
- Prime Minister: Sir Joseph Ward
- Preceded by: Robert Wright
- Succeeded by: Robert Masters

Member of the New Zealand Parliament for Nelson
- In office 17 December 1919 – 20 August 1946
- Preceded by: Thomas Field
- Succeeded by: Edgar Neale
- In office 19 December 1911 – 11 December 1914
- Preceded by: John Graham
- Succeeded by: Thomas Field

Personal details
- Born: 14 December 1870 Nelson, New Zealand
- Died: 20 August 1946 (aged 75) Nelson, New Zealand
- Party: Independent
- Spouse: Dorothy Annie Corrigan (m. 1936)
- Relations: James Randall Corrigan (father-in-law)
- Profession: Signwriter

Harry Atmore (14 December 1870 – 20 August 1946) was a New Zealand Independent Member of Parliament for Nelson in the South Island. He held the Nelson seat as an independent for a total of thirty years from 1911 to 1914 and then from 1919 to his death in 1946. He was Minister of Education and Minister in charge of the Department of Scientific and Industrial Research (DSIR) in Sir Joseph Ward's United Government of 1928 to 1931.

== Early years ==
Born in Nelson, in 1870, Atmore attended the publicly funded School in Bridge Street, Nelson and represented the province in rugby. He later moved to Wellington and spent eight years there as an apprentice signwriter and decorator. After his apprenticeship, Atmore returned to Nelson and established his own signwriting and decorating business.

Atmore was prominent in local affairs. He was a member of the Nelson Licensing Committee, Education Board and Hospital Board. In 1905, he was elected to the Nelson City Council. Later, he served on the Nelson College Council of Governors and Cawthron Institute Trust Board.

== Member of Parliament ==
New Zealand Parliament
Years	Term	Electorate	Party
1911–14	18th	Nelson	Independent
1919–22	20th	Nelson	Independent
1922–25	21st	Nelson	Independent
1925–28	22nd	Nelson	Independent
1928–31	23rd	Nelson	Independent
1931–35	24th	Nelson	Independent
1935–38	25th	Nelson	Independent
1938–43	26th	Nelson	Independent
1943–46	27th	Nelson	Independent

Atmore unsuccessfully contested the Nelson seat in 1902, 1905 and 1908 against the Liberal John Graham. In 1911 he became Nelson's Member of Parliament. Atmore gave his support in Sir Joseph Ward's Liberal government by voting for it on a no-confidence motion, which was saved by just one vote. Whilst remaining an independent, he normally supported the Liberals from then on. Regardless, Atmore's political independence was always discernible. He believed that politicians should be, first and foremost, representatives of the people. That when elected they should put principle before party.

Atmore lost his seat in the 1914 election, but returned to parliament in 1919 after unsuccessfully contesting the Wellington Central 1918 by-election which was won by Peter Fraser, the Labour Party candidate.

Initially, Atmore was opposed to the rising Labour Party and was doubtful of its socialist agenda. He was also an admirer of Benito Mussolini due to his opposition to socialist radicals in Italy. As a result, Labour put considerable effort in to defeat him in 1925. Gradually Atmore's animosity towards Labour lessened and Labour did not stand a candidate against him after that.

Following the 1928 election he supported Ward's new United Party form a majority and was rewarded with a position in cabinet, as Minister of Education. As a largely self-educated man, he had passionate concern for education and took to his new responsibilities with vigor. Atmore's first goal as education minister was to ensure every child in New Zealand could have the opportunity to gain a proper education to realise their own potential. He formed a committee to examine the existing public education system. The outcome was the "Atmore Report" which recommended several radical reforms including raising the age to leave school to 15, establishing intermediate schools, abolishing scholarship entry to secondary school, and widening the secondary school curriculum to also cover non University approved subjects. When a terminally ill Ward resigned as prime minister in 1930, Atmore contested the leadership of the party but was eliminated in the first round of a four-way contested caucus ballot. George Forbes won the Premiership.

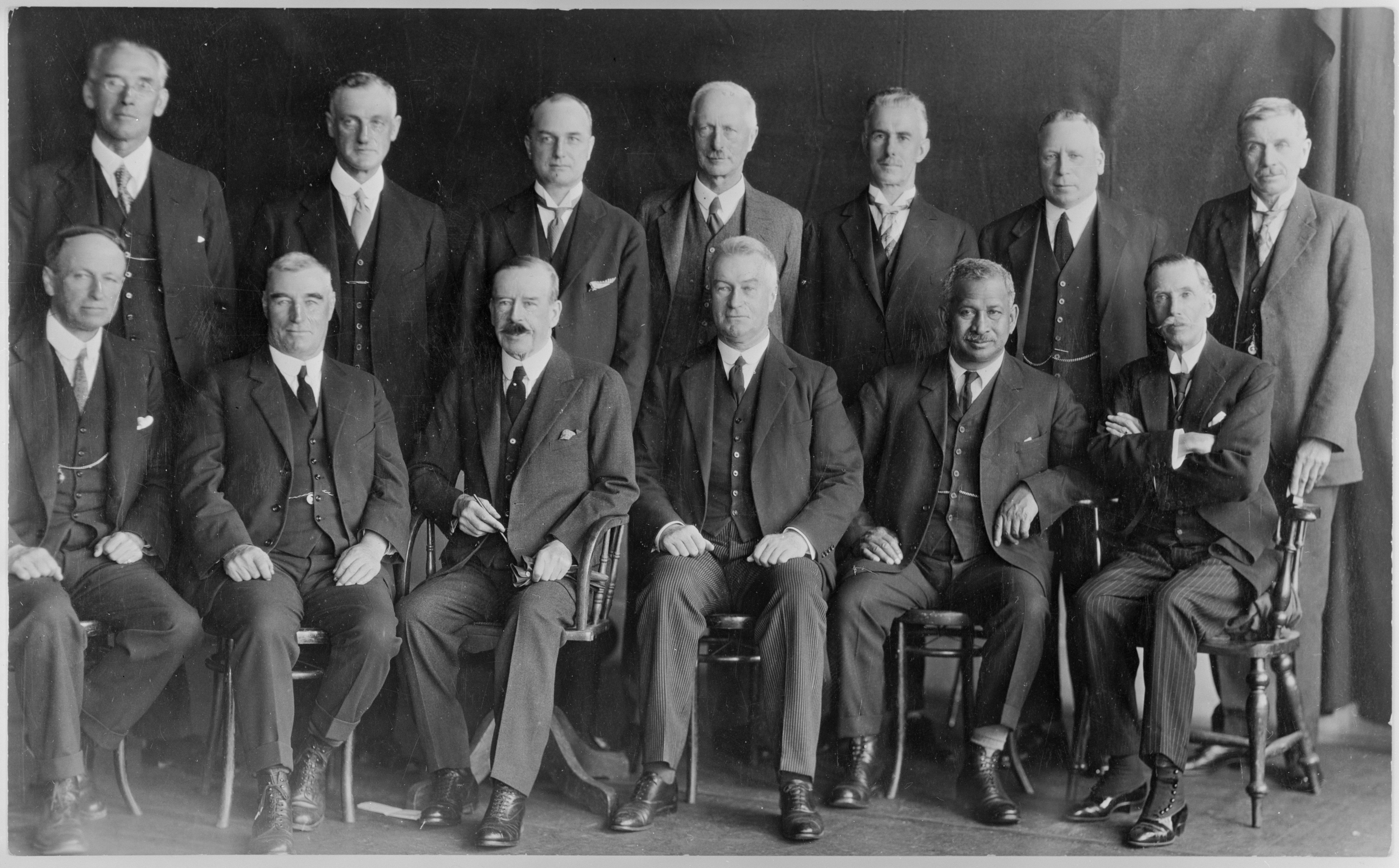
Atmore (seated first on left) in the United cabinet, 1928.

Initially retained in the Forbes ministry, Atmore resigned as education minister in 1931 when cuts were proposed for his portfolio due to the worsening depression and formation of the coalition government which he was opposed to. However, many of his ideas were later implemented under the First Labour Government where Peter Fraser (who was a member of Atmore's Committee) was minister of education. Fraser's Education Amendment Act 1938 was to endorse and implement most of Atmore's recommendations.

Atmore read and thought widely. He was one New Zealander who was looking for solutions to problems within the altered economic, social and political context of inter-war New Zealand. He believed it was important to be informed on the issues of the day including monetary reform, international rearmament and the pivotal role of the USSR in any crisis. Curiously, he was a social credit monetary reform sponsor and campaigned for it vigorously, blaming many of New Zealand's debt problems in the early 1930s on obligations to pay interest on its debts in London.

On 8 August 1946 Atmore announced his intention not to stand again at the next election. However, only two weeks later, on 20 August, he was found dead at his home. He was buried at Wakapuaka Cemetery.

== Personal life ==
Atmore was a well known man in Nelson, refusing to drive a car, instead preferring to ride a bicycle everywhere locally which made him a visible addition to the community. He personally answered all messages and requests in his own handwriting as an indication of his dedication to his work.

Atmore married Dorothy Annie Corrigan on 24 June 1936, at the age of 65, at Hāwera. There were no children from the marriage. Dorothy was both wealthy and well-educated. The two built a new home named Te Maunga and made it a local centre of hospitality. Throughout World War II the two were both actively involved in patriotic work, which was to earn Dorothy an MBE. Dorothy lived a further thirty years as a widow, dying in 1976.

Atmore's grip on the Nelson seat was due primarily to his commitment and availability to his constituents. He organised a call to repair a country school, the completion of the Nelson railway, an exemption for an only son of an elderly farming couple from military service and helped issue jobs in the public service to the unemployed. For an entire generation Atmore worked for all Nelson residents with such a commitment that his constituents regarded him to be a personal friend.

== Legacy ==
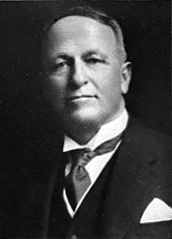
Atmore, late 1920s.

In 1935, he was awarded the King George V Silver Jubilee Medal.

Robert Chapman comments on Harry Atmore:

Nelson even shares with Hobson a record of preferring political idiosyncrancy. Nine times out of ten between 1911 and 1946 Nelson voted for Harry Atmore, who confounded cynics by moving to the Left politically as he got older. Having begun as an Independent Liberal, he thereafter passed through many shades of independence to finish as his own variety of consistently pro-Labour MP.

Historians have regarded Atmore as the last example of an earlier, simpler political age, before the rise of the party system. He embodied the aspirations of small town residents and their desires for a fairer and more egalitarian society.

== Books ==
- "This Debt Slavery" by Harry Atmore, M.P. and John A. Lee, M.P. (1940 Budget Speeches, Commercial Printing & Publishing, Auckland).
- "The Mortgage Corporation Bill" by Harry Atmore, M.P. and Capt. Harold Rushworth, M.P. (A copy is held at the Macmillan Brown Library, University of Canterbury, Christchurch).
- "You and the USSR" by Harry Atmore, M.P. and 'Uncle Scrim' i.e. Colin G. Scrimgeour (1941, Society for Closer Relations with Russia, Wellington).

== See also ==
- The Atmore Report, 1930

New Zealand Parliament
Preceded by John Graham	Member of Parliament for Nelson; 1911–1914 1919–1946	Succeeded by Thomas Field
Preceded by Thomas Field	Member of Parliament for Nelson; 1911–1914 1919–1946	Succeeded by Edgar Neale
Political offices
Preceded by Robert Wright	Minister of Education; 1928–1931	Succeeded by Robert Masters
Preceded by Gordon Coates	Minister for Science and Industrial Research; 1928–1930	Succeeded by George Forbes
