= Albert Pitt =

New Zealand politician

The Honourable Albert Pitt
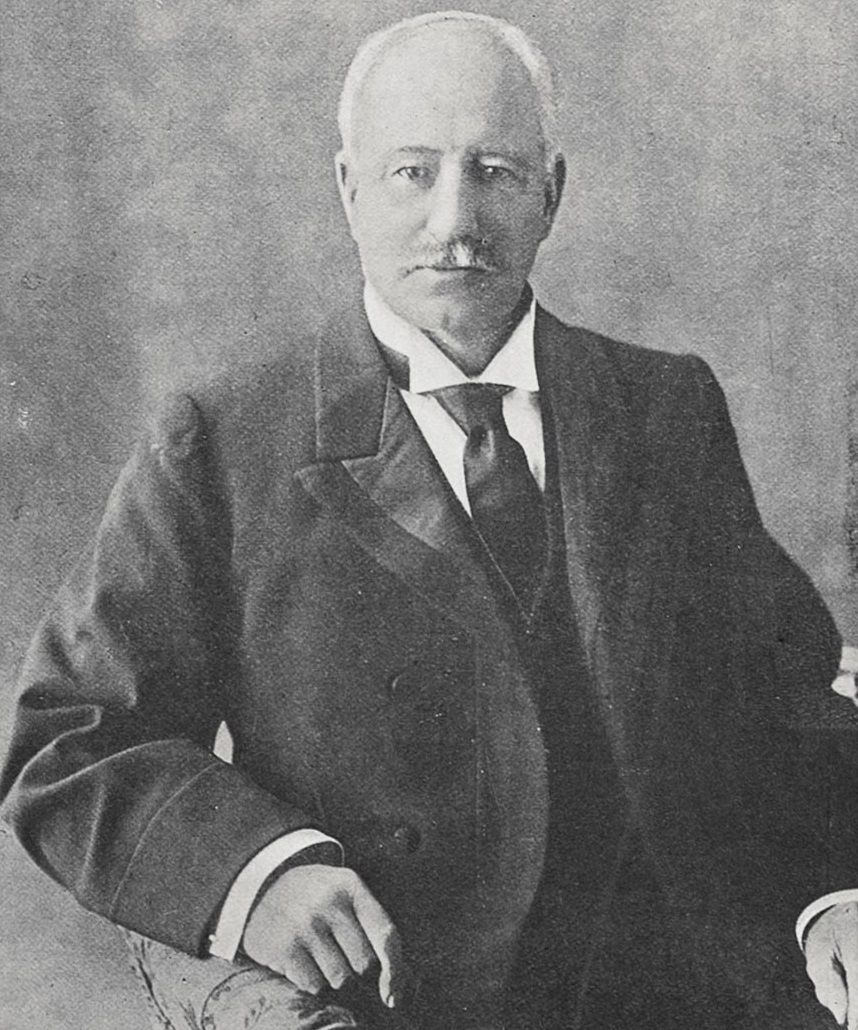

9th Attorney-General of New Zealand
- In office 22 June 1903 – 23 November 1906
- Preceded by: Patrick Buckley
- Succeeded by: John Findlay

Personal details
- Born: 1842 Hobart, Tasmania
- Died: 18 November 1906 (aged 63–64) Christchurch, New Zealand
- Party: Liberal
- Spouse: Emma Bartlett

Lieutenant-Colonel the Hon Albert Pitt (1842 – 18 November 1906) was a 19th-century New Zealand politician, and a cabinet minister. In 1914, eight years after his death, The Albert Pitt Memorial Gates were erected in the Queen's Gardens, Nelson.

== Early life and profession ==
Pitt was born in Hobart, Tasmania. His father, Captain Francis Pitt, was harbourmaster at Hobart. Pitt was educated in Tasmania. He studied law and started his professional career.

In 1864 Pitt migrated to Nelson, starting his own law firm. He returned briefly to Hobart to marry Emma Bartlett, daughter of Edmund Bartlett, Launceston, Tasmania on 25 January 1866. On his return to Nelson, Pitt appeared as an advocate for the defendants in the Maungatapu murders case in mid-1866. In 1868 he entered into partnership with Henry Adams, trading as Adams and Pitt. When the partnership with Adams ended he went into partnership with Edward Moore, the firm being called Pitt and Moore.

== Military service ==
In 1861 he joined the Hobart Town Artillery Company and held the rank of sergeant. After migrating to New Zealand, in December 1866 Pitt was appointed to command the Nelson Artillery Volunteer Cadet Corps. In 1871 the corps was renamed the Nelson Volunteer Artillery Corps, with Pitt remaining its captain. On 8 November 1877 he was appointed Commander of the Nelson militia and volunteer district and given the rank of major. A position he held until elected to Parliament in September 1879.

In 1881 Pitt commanded about 900 volunteers on active service at Parihaka under Lieut-Colonel Roberts expedition to arrest Te Whiti, Tohu, and Hiroki. In 1885 Pitt was appointed a Lieutenant-Colonel of the New Zealand Militia. When the volunteer districts were consolidated in 1895, Pitt was appointed to the command of the Nelson district. The volunteer district included Nelson, Marlborough, and Westland. Pitt was awarded the New Zealand long-service medal and the Imperial volunteer officer's decoration. In 1897, he commanded a contingent of volunteers from New Zealand that went to England for the celebrations of Queen Victoria's Diamond Jubilee. Pitt resigned his command on being called to the Legislative Council in 1899.

== Public service ==
Pitt was also a member of the Nelson Diocesan Synod and a member of the Nelson College Board of Governors for many years. In his younger days in Nelson, Pitt was involved in theatre and amateur opera.

== Political service ==
New Zealand Parliament
Years	Term	Electorate	Party
1879–1881	7th	Nelson	Independent

In 1867 Pitt was elected to the Nelson Provincial Council and was appointed Provincial Solicitor.

He stood for the House of Representatives in an 1879 by-election but was defeated by Acton Adams; Adams was a Secularist and opposed denominational education as favoured by Catholics.

Pitt represented the City of Nelson electorate from 1879 to 1881, when he retired.

He became a member of the Legislative Council in 1899 and in June 1903 a member of the Seddon Government, as Attorney-General. He was the Attorney-General from 1903 until his death at 5pm on 18 November 1906. Pitt had been appointed Minister in charge of the Christchurch Exhibition, but had become ill before it opened. He still proceeded to Christchurch where his health deteriorated, necessitating an operation on 13 November. Though reasonably successful Pitt's health did not improve and he died on the Saturday.

He was survived by his son and two daughters, his wife having died of a heart attack on 31 August 1899.

Political offices
Preceded by Patrick Buckley	Attorney-General; 1903–1906	Succeeded by John Findlay
New Zealand Parliament
Preceded by Oswald Curtis	Member of Parliament for Nelson; 1879–1881; Served alongside: Acton Adams, Henry Levestam	Succeeded by Henry Levestam
