= John Graham (New Zealand politician) =

New Zealand politician

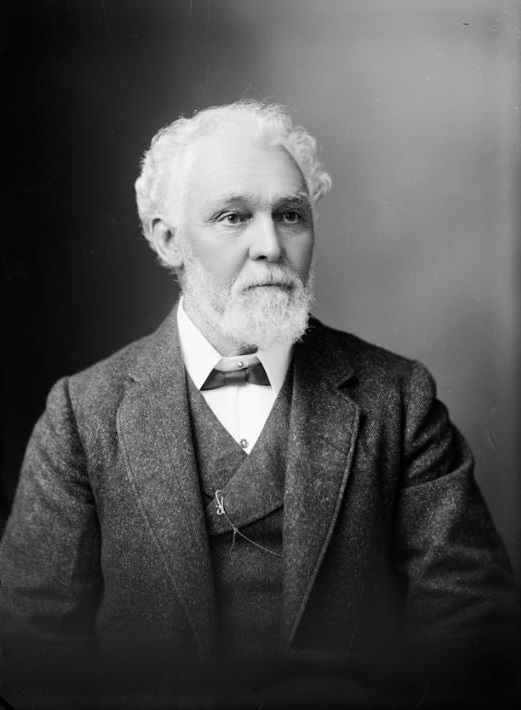

Member of the New Zealand Parliament for Nelson
- In office 1893–1911
- Preceded by: Joseph Harkness
- Succeeded by: Harry Atmore

Personal details
- Born: 12 January 1843 Nelson, New Zealand
- Died: 8 February 1926 (aged 83) Feilding, New Zealand
- Party: Liberal

John Graham (12 January 1843 – 8 February 1926) was a New Zealand Member of Parliament for Nelson in the South Island.

== Early life ==
Graham was born in Nelson in 1843, the eldest son of one of the earliest European settlers of the region.

== Member of Parliament ==
New Zealand Parliament
Years	Term	Electorate	Party
1893–1896	12th	Nelson	Liberal
1896–1899	13th	Nelson	Liberal
1899–1902	14th	Nelson	Liberal
1902–1905	15th	Nelson	Liberal
1905–1908	16th	Nelson	Liberal
1908–1911	17th	Nelson	Liberal

John Graham represented the Nelson electorate in the House of Representatives for 18 years from 1893 to 1911, when he retired.

The 1893 general election was contested by four candidates in Nelson: Graham (1289 votes), Richmond Hursthouse (1011 votes), John Kerr (910 votes) and William Lock (74 votes). The 1896 general election was contested by Graham and Jesse Piper, who received 2061 and 1718 votes, respectively. Graham was thus elected with a majority of 343 votes.

=== Independent Liberal ===
In 1894, Graham successfully opposed the Midland Railway Bill insofar as it proposed to abandon the obligations of the company to provide a railway to Nelson.

As Chairman of the Banking Enquiry Committee of 1896, John Graham frequently came into conflict with the Premier Richard Seddon, the Minister of Lands, John McKenzie, and George Hutchison

== Public offices ==
Graham was for some years chairman of the Town Schools' Committee. He was the first chairman of the Nelson Harbour Board and held that position for twelve years. He served on the Nelson Education Board, the Board of Governors of Nelson College (1894) and Council of Victoria College in Wellington (1899–1912). He was also a member of the Nelson City Council.

== Death ==
Graham died in Feilding on 8 February 1926, after having lived in Nelson for practically all of his life.

== See also ==
- Nelson Railway Proposals

New Zealand Parliament
Preceded by Joseph Harkness	Member of Parliament for Nelson; 1893–1911	Succeeded by Harry Atmore
