= Acton Adams =

New Zealand politician and farmer (1843–1924)

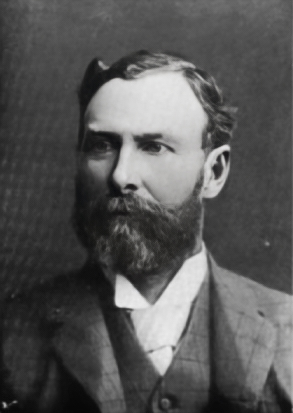

Member of the New Zealand Parliament for Nelson
- In office 1879–1881
- Preceded by: John Sharp
- Succeeded by: Henry Levestam

Personal details
- Born: William Acton Blakeway Adams; 1843 Wilden Manor, Tenbury Wells, Worcestershire, England
- Died: 24 January 1924 (aged 80) Knightsbridge, London, England
- Spouse: Harriette Frances Leadam (m. 1869)
- Relations: William Adams (father)
- Profession: Lawyer

William Acton Blakeway Adams JP (1843 – 24 January 1924), known as Acton Adams, was a 19th-century Member of Parliament from Nelson, New Zealand.

== Early life ==
Adams was born at Wilden Manor, Tenbury Wells, Worcestershire, England, in 1843. The Adams family was descended from a William Adams who inherited the property of the supposed Knight Sturmy, an 11th-century Crusader. There is an element of doubt around who Sturmy was. An 1830 publication states the John Sturmy of Tenbury was not a Crusader.

Adams was the oldest son of William Adams, an English solicitor. His father, together with his family, migrated to Nelson on the ship Eden in 1850, acquired two runs in Wairau and became leader of the separation movement between Nelson and the Wairau. The Wairau was later renamed Marlborough. His father was Marlborough's first Superintendent, the first Commissioner of Crown Lands, and afterwards member of the House of Representatives for Picton. On retiring from political life, his father returned to practising law, replacing William Travers in the Nelson firm of Travers and Kingdon. The firm's name was changed to Adams and Kingdon.

== Legal career ==
Adams attended Nelson College from 1857 to 1859 being both Head Boy and Captain of the Cricket team. While his father was involved in politics, Adams took over management of the Wairau sheep runs. In 1862 he joined Adams and Kingdon, being admitted as a barrister and solicitor in 1867. He left for England in 1867 to study law at the Inner Temple, London, and returned to Nelson in 1869 to become a junior partner in the firm. While in London Adams married Harriette Frances Leadam, on 27 July 1869.

== Political career ==
New Zealand Parliament
Years	Term	Electorate	Party
1879	6th	Nelson	Independent
1879–1881	7th	Nelson	Independent

From 1873 to 1876, Adams represented the Nelson electorate in the Nelson Provincial Council. He was leader of the Opposition. He successfully ran against Colonel Pitt for election to the House of Representatives in the Nelson electorate in an 1879 by-election as a supporter of Sir John Hall. When the Grey Government was defeated in a confidence motion Adams was again elected as a supporter of the Hall Ministry. In 1881 Adams fell seriously ill and as his medical advisors considered he may not recover he resigned from Parliament. He also stepped down from his position with Adams and Kingdon at that time handing it over to his brother, Percy Adams. His resignation caused the 1881 by-election, which was won by Henry Levestam.

== Railway supporter ==
In 1872, as treasurer of the Nelson and West Coast Railway League, he proposed constructing the line by means of land grants.

When he moved to Christchurch in 1885, Adams joined the Christchurch League that was seeking to have a railway connection with Nelson. He along with others formed the East and West Coast and Nelson Railway League and became its chairman. Adams' work resulted in the Midland Railway Company.

== Christchurch ==
In 1881 Adams went on a trip to Europe to regain his health, taking his family with him. In 1883 Adams returned and settled in Christchurch. He had agreed not to practise law in Nelson when he resigned from Adams and Kingdon.

Adams went into partnership with Thomas Joynt, founding Joynt and Acton-Adams. When the partnership was dissolved in 1887, he founded Acton-Adams and Kippenberger. Adams also continued his interest in sheep-farming, adding the Molesworth Station to Tarndale station, purchasing the Hopefield-Woodbank station in the Amuri district, acquiring Island Farm and the Salop Downs estates in Selwyn County, and purchasing a part of the Motunau property and other adjoining lands he founded the Tipapa Estate. Adams converted several thousand acres of tussock land to grass pastures.

== Rabbit invasion and later life ==
About 1890 the Amuri was invaded by rabbits from Kaikōura and Blenheim in such numbers as to practically ruin the back country runs. Adams sustained very severe financial losses. Fighting the rabbits and the consequent financial depression compelled him to devote most of his time to farming matters and practically to retire from the law. Adams was one of the largest landholders in Marlborough and Canterbury with some 75,000 sheep. He later returned to England to London where he continued to take a keen interest in New Zealand. While in London he was a Fellow of the Royal Colonial Institute and was on the council of the Imperial Institute.

He had three sons Herbert, Reginald, and Percy; and one daughter, Adine.

Adams died in London at 74 Park Mansions, Knightsbridge on 24 January 1924 after what was described as a long and tedious illness that had resulted from an operation he had had in 1920. He was cremated and interred in the family vault near the Church of St Mary the Virgin, Tenbury.

His estate was worth £202,868.

== Notes ==
New Zealand Parliament
Preceded by John Sharp	Member of Parliament for Nelson; 1879–1881; Served alongside: Oswald Curtis, Albert Pitt	Succeeded by Henry Levestam
