= Atawhai =

Suburb of Nelson, New Zealand

Atawhai Atawhai (Māori)
- Township
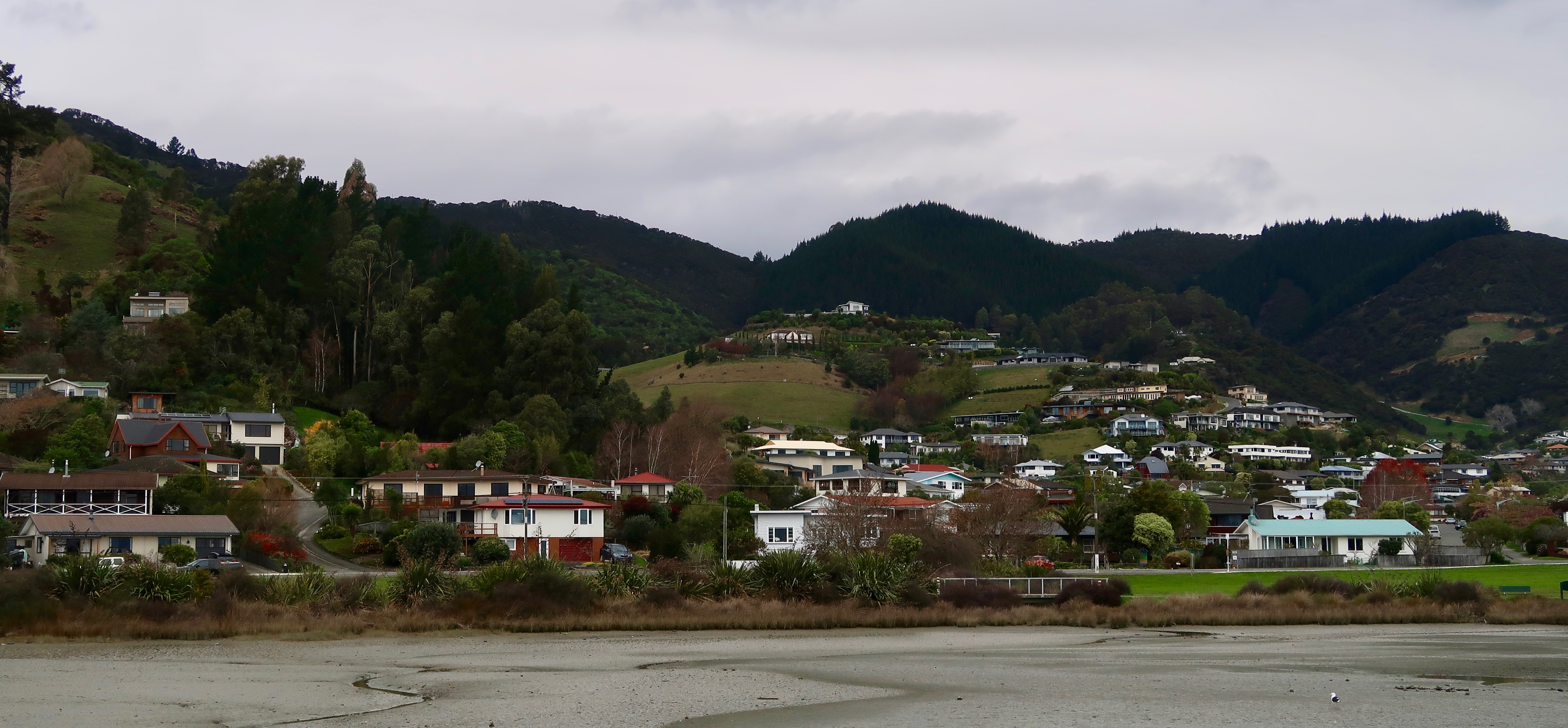
- The suburb of Atawhai
- Interactive map of Atawhai
- Coordinates: 41.237°S 173.317°E
- Country: New Zealand
- Region: Nelson
- Ward: Central General Ward; Whakatū Māori Ward
- Electorates: Nelson; Te Tai Tonga (Māori)

Government
  - Territorial Authority: Nelson City Council
  - Nelson City Mayor: Nick Smith
  - Nelson MP: Rachel Boyack
  - Te Tai Tonga MP: Tākuta Ferris

Area
  - Total: 4.54 km^{2} (1.75 sq mi)

Population (June 2025)
  - Total: 2,890
  - Density: 637/km^{2} (1,650/sq mi)
- Time zone: UTC+12 (NZST)
  - Summer (DST): UTC+13 (NZDT)
- Postcode: 7010
- Area code: 03

Atawhai is a suburb of Nelson, on the South Island of New Zealand. It lies north of Nelson and is the location of Wakapuaka Cemetery, a burial place since 1861. It also has a coastline on Nelson Haven and access to Boulder Bank via State Highway 6.

== Geography ==
Atawhai, including Brooklands and Dodson Valley, covers an area of 4.54 km^{2}, including a land area of 4.54 km^{2}.

Miyazu Japanese Garden, a Japanese public garden and public reserve, is located in Atawhai.

Wakapuaka Cemetery is also located in the area.

Atawhai also has several local parks: Bayview Reserve, Corder Park, Frenchay Reserve, Montrose Reserve, Ngapua Reserve, Queen Elizabeth II Reserve, Te-Ata Reserve, Titoki Reserve, Tresillian Reserve and Werneth Reserve.

== History and culture ==
The estimated population of Atawhai reached 2,000 in 1996.

It reached 2,220 in 2001, 2,208 in 2006, 2,556 in 2013, and 2,790 in 2018.

Whakatū Marae is located in Atawhai. It is the marae (meeting ground) of Ngāti Kōata, Ngāti Rārua, Ngāti Tama ki Te Tau Ihu, Ngāti Toa Rangatira and Te Atiawa o Te Waka-a-Māui. It includes the Kākāti wharenui (meeting house).

== Demography ==
The Atawhai statistical area had an estimated population of 2,890 as of June 2025, with a population density of 637 people per km^{2}.

Historical population
Year	Pop.	±% p.a.
1996	2,000	—
2001	2,220	+2.11%
2006	2,208	−0.11%
2013	2,556	+2.11%
2018	2,790	+1.77%
2023	2,877	+0.62%

Atawhai had a population of 2,877 in the 2023 New Zealand census, an increase of 87 people (3.1%) since the 2018 census, and an increase of 321 people (12.6%) since the 2013 census. There were 1,389 males, 1,485 females, and 9 people of other genders in 1,176 dwellings. 3.2% of people identified as LGBTIQ+. The median age was 51.1 years (compared with 38.1 years nationally). There were 417 people (14.5%) aged under 15 years, 351 (12.2%) aged 15 to 29, 1,359 (47.2%) aged 30 to 64, and 753 (26.2%) aged 65 or older.

People could identify as more than one ethnicity. The results were 91.3% European (Pākehā); 8.7% Māori; 0.9% Pasifika; 4.4% Asian; 1.1% Middle Eastern, Latin American and African New Zealanders (MELAA); and 2.8% other, which includes people giving their ethnicity as "New Zealander". English was spoken by 98.2%, Māori by 2.5%, Samoan by 0.1%, and other languages by 10.9%. No language could be spoken by 1.4% (e.g. too young to talk). New Zealand Sign Language was known by 0.4%. The percentage of people born overseas was 29.8, compared with 28.8% nationally.

Religious affiliations were 25.5% Christian, 0.5% Hindu, 0.2% Islam, 0.1% Māori religious beliefs, 0.4% Buddhist, 0.5% New Age, 0.3% Jewish, and 1.6% other religions. People who answered that they had no religion were 64.5%, and 6.8% of people did not answer the census question.

Of those at least 15 years old, 858 (34.9%) people had a bachelor's or higher degree, 1,206 (49.0%) had a post-high school certificate or diploma, and 402 (16.3%) people exclusively held high school qualifications. The median income was $41,900, compared with $41,500 nationally. 288 people (11.7%) earned over $100,000 compared to 12.1% nationally. The employment status of those at least 15 was 1,068 (43.4%) full-time, 456 (18.5%) part-time, and 39 (1.6%) unemployed.

== Economy ==
In 2018, 6.9% worked in manufacturing, 8.5% worked in construction, 4.0% worked in hospitality, 4.6% worked in transport, 7.9% worked in education, and 13.5% worked in healthcare.

== Transport ==
As of 2018, among those who commute to work, 73.5% drove a car, 3.4% rode in a car, 7.1% use a bike, and 7.1% walk or run. No one used public transport.
