= Edward Everett (disambiguation) =

Edward Everett (1794–1865) was an American politician, pastor, educator, diplomat, and orator.

Edward Everett may also refer to:

- Edward Everett (artist) (1818–1903), American artist
- Edward William Everett (1821–1904), mayor of Nelson, New Zealand
- Allen Edward Everitt (1824–1882), English artist
- Edward Hamlin Everett (1851–1929), American businessman and philanthropist
- Edward A. Everett (New York politician) (1860–1928), New York state legislator
- Edward A. Everett (Wisconsin politician) (1861–?), Wisconsin state assemblyman
- Edward Everett Square, a square in Boston
