= Brooklands (disambiguation) =

Brooklands may refer to:

== Places ==
=== Australia ===
- Brooklands, Queensland, a locality in the South Burnett Region, Queensland

=== England ===
- Brooklands, a former motor racing circuit and aerodrome in Surrey
- Brooklands, Greater Manchester
  - Brooklands (Manchester ward), electoral ward of Manchester City Council
  - Brooklands (Trafford ward), electoral ward of Trafford Metropolitan Borough Council
- Brooklands, a district in the civil parish of Broughton in Milton Keynes
- Brooklands, Sarisbury, a house in Hampshire
- Brooklands (Havering ward), electoral ward in London

=== New Zealand ===
- Brooklands, New Plymouth, a suburb of New Plymouth in Taranaki
- Brooklands, Nelson, a suburb of Nelson
- Brooklands, Christchurch, a settlement north-east of Christchurch, close to the mouth of the Waimakariri River
- Brooklands, Otago, a farming locality near Milton, in Otago

=== United States ===
- Brooklands, now Brooklands Park in Suffern, New York. Home of Daniel Carter Beard, a founder of Boy Scouts of America.

== Others ==
- The Bentley Brooklands motor car, named after the racing circuit
- The limited edition Ford Capri 280, nicknamed "Brooklands", referring to the name of the shade of green that all Capri 280 models were painted in
