= Dodson Valley =

- Suburb
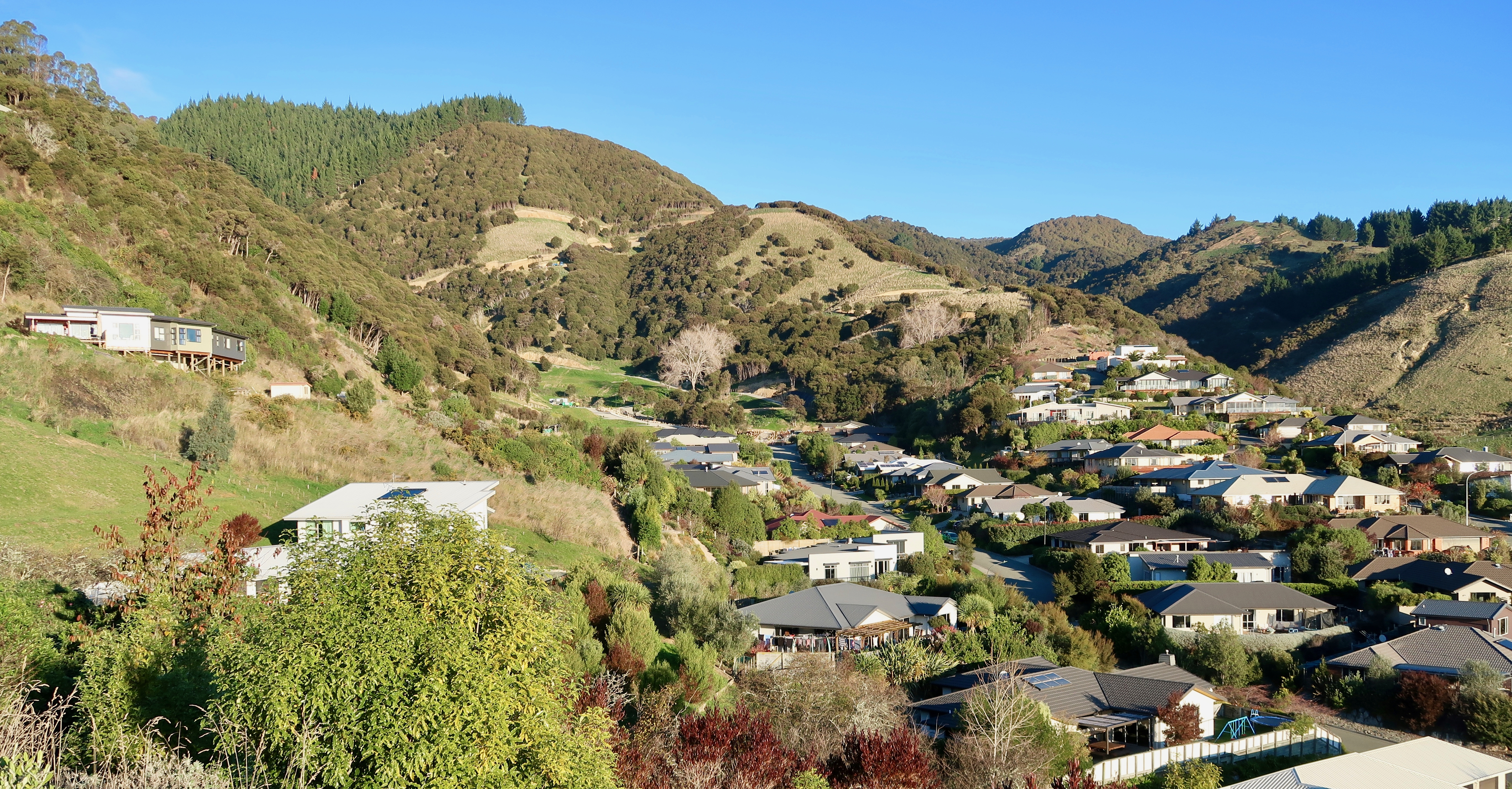
- Looking up Dodson Valley
- Interactive map of Dodson Valley
- Coordinates: 41°14′30″S 173°19′30″E
- Country: New Zealand
- Region: Nelson
- Ward: Central General Ward; Whakatū Māori Ward
- Electorates: Nelson; Te Tai Tonga (Māori)

Government
  - Territorial Authority: Nelson City Council
  - Nelson City Mayor: Nick Smith
  - Nelson MP: Rachel Boyack
  - Te Tai Tonga MP: Tākuta Ferris

Area
  - Total: 1.23 km^{2} (0.47 sq mi)

Population (2023 census)
  - Total: 132
  - Density: 107/km^{2} (278/sq mi)
- Time zone: UTC+12 (NZST)
  - Summer (DST): UTC+13 (NZDT)

Dodson Valley is a sub-suburb in Nelson, New Zealand, located by heading north into Atawhai. It borders between the coast Nelson Haven and further inland, featuring the main St. Dodson Valley Road.

== Demographics ==
Dodson Valley covers 1.23 km^{2} (0.47 sq mi). It is part of the larger Atawhai statistical area.

Historical population
Year	Pop.	±% p.a.
2006	99	—
2013	102	+0.43%
2018	93	−1.83%
2023	132	+7.26%

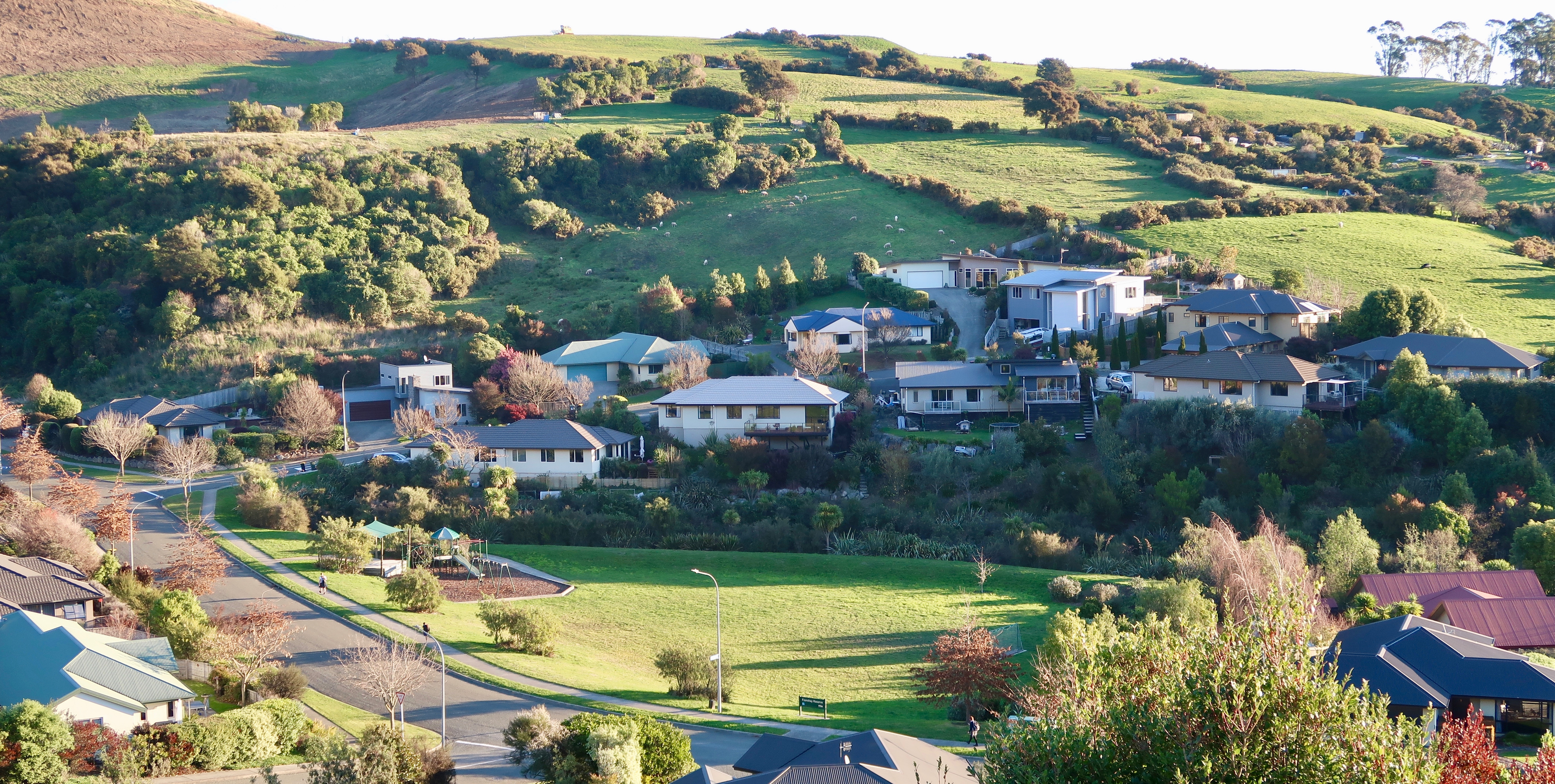
Looking down Dodson Valley

Dodson Valley had a population of 132 in the 2023 New Zealand census, an increase of 39 people (41.9%) since the 2018 census, and an increase of 30 people (29.4%) since the 2013 census. There were 63 males and 69 females in 51 dwellings. 4.5% of people identified as LGBTIQ+. The median age was 51.8 years (compared with 38.1 years nationally). There were 18 people (13.6%) aged under 15 years, 18 (13.6%) aged 15 to 29, 69 (52.3%) aged 30 to 64, and 27 (20.5%) aged 65 or older.

People could identify as more than one ethnicity. The results were 90.9% European (Pākehā); 2.3% Māori; 6.8% Asian; 2.3% Middle Eastern, Latin American and African New Zealanders (MELAA); and 4.5% other, which includes people giving their ethnicity as "New Zealander". English was spoken by 97.7%, and other languages by 18.2%. The percentage of people born overseas was 40.9, compared with 28.8% nationally.

Religious affiliations were 13.6% Christian, 2.3% New Age, and 2.3% other religions. People who answered that they had no religion were 72.7%, and 6.8% of people did not answer the census question.

Of those at least 15 years old, 54 (47.4%) people had a bachelor's or higher degree, 45 (39.5%) had a post-high school certificate or diploma, and 18 (15.8%) people exclusively held high school qualifications. The median income was $42,700, compared with $41,500 nationally. 21 people (18.4%) earned over $100,000 compared to 12.1% nationally. The employment status of those at least 15 was 57 (50.0%) full-time and 27 (23.7%) part-time.
