= Joseph Levien =

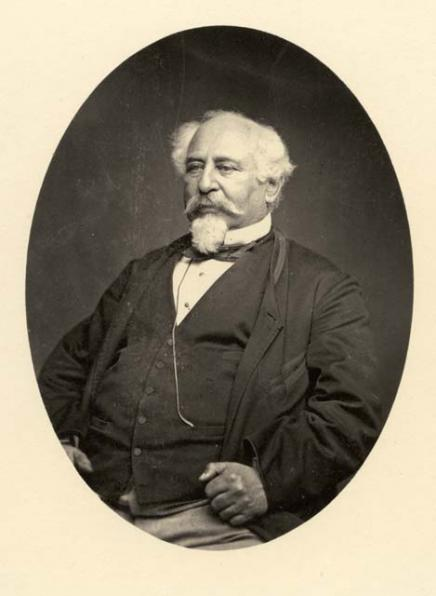
- Joseph Levien

2nd Mayor of Nelson, New Zealand
- In office 26 February 1875 – 7 June 1876

Personal details
- Born: 1810/1811
- Died: 7 June 1876 Nelson
- Resting place: Wakapuaka Cemetery; 41.25712°S 173.30300°E

John Henry Levien (1810/1811 – 7 June 1876) Esquire, JP was a Freemason and Mayor of Nelson in New Zealand from 1875 to 1876.

== Professional career ==
Levien was a merchant in both Australia and New Zealand. In 1837 he was in partnership in Sydney and in 1844 at Wellington, New Zealand acting as agent for the brigantine Vanguard. In 1854 he was described as a Collins Street, Hobart merchant and in 1855 a resident of Melbourne. By 1857 he was a merchant in Nelson. He traded under the name J. Levien & Co. Levien was also a shareholder in the Dun Mountain Copper Mining Company. He was involved with the organising of a Gas Company to provide street lighting for Nelson, a Director of the Nelson Gold Mining Company, and a member of the Nelson Chamber of Commerce.

== Political career ==
Levien's first foray into politics appears to have been in 1860 when he unsuccessfully stood for the Board of Works.

He was actively interested in politics and public affairs, but only became prominent in 1875 when the municipalities affairs were in crises. Levien became Mayor of Nelson on 26 February 1875 after the Mayor and several Councillors resigned over a dispute with the Provincial Council and finance. The council's accounts were in a muddle according to its auditors and it had a large overdraft at the bank, and it went bankrupt in early 1875. As a result of Levien's hard work he set the accounts in order, urged economy from the newly elected Councillors and returned the council to credit.

At the end of 1875 Levien was asked by the Councillors to remain as Mayor for 1876, which he agreed to do. Among the Councillors who called for him to stand for re-election were Edward William Everett and William Reid Waters, the two subsequent mayors. As no one else was nominated he was consequently reappointed.

Levien was appointed a Justice of the Peace in March 1875.

On 19 February 1876 the Eastern Extension Australia and China Telegraph Company cable linking New Zealand with Australia and the Far East was landed at Schroder's Mistake, Wakapuaka (now known as Cable Bay) 21 kilometres (13 mi) north of Nelson. This significant event prompted Levien to invite the Governor (The Marquess of Normanby), Premier (Julius Vogel) and ministers to celebrate the landing. He was politely declined by the Premier and derided in the neighbouring province's newspaper.

== Death ==
Levien died in office on 7 June 1876 after a long and painful illness aged 65 years. He was buried at Wakapuaka Cemetery the following day. He was survived by his wife.

Robert Levien (1834 in London – 1893) decided in 1864 to settle in Nelson where his uncle Joseph Levien had already been for some time. Robert Levien was also a merchant and was first elected a Nelson City Councillor in the late 1870s.

Political offices
Preceded by Joseph Dodson	Mayor of Nelson; 1875–1876	Succeeded by Edward William Everett
