= Wakapuaka Cemetery =

Cemetery in Nelson, New Zealand

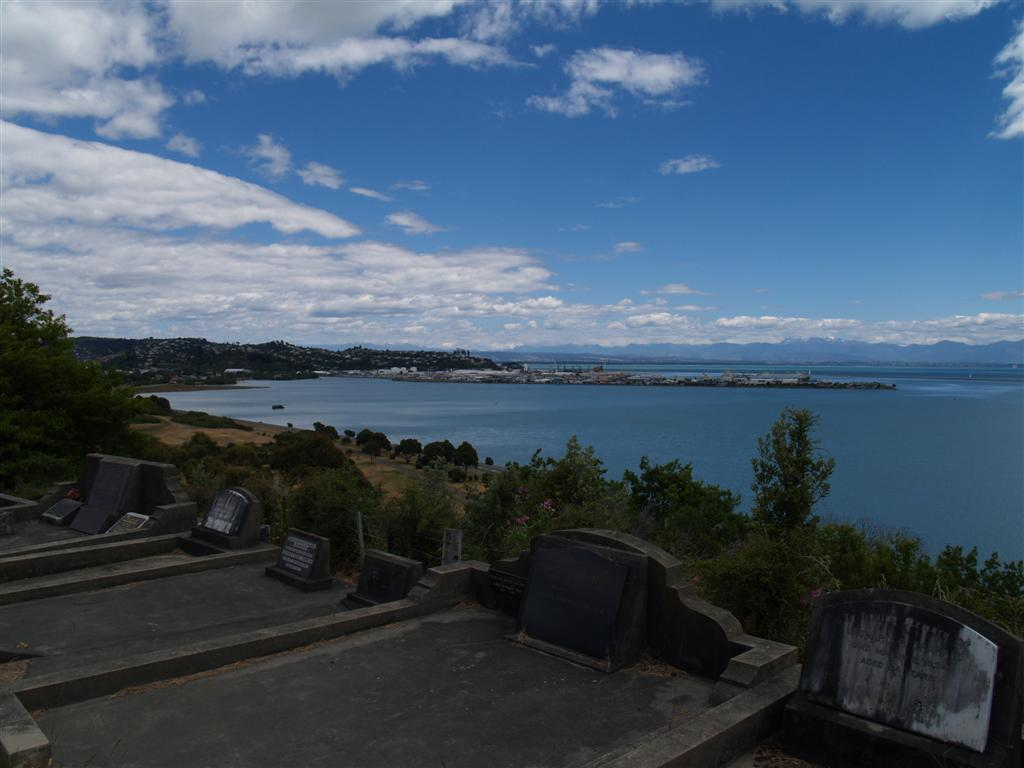
- City look-out from the south of the cemetery
- Interactive map of Wakapuaka Cemetery

Details
- Established: 1861
- Location: Brooklands, Nelson, New Zealand
- Country: New Zealand
- Coordinates: 41°15′23.5″S 173°18′13.8″E
- Website: Cemeteries database
- Find a Grave: Wakapuaka Cemetery

Wakapuaka Cemetery is a cemetery located in Brooklands, Nelson, New Zealand. "Wakapuaka" is Māori for "heaps of aka leaves".

== Location ==
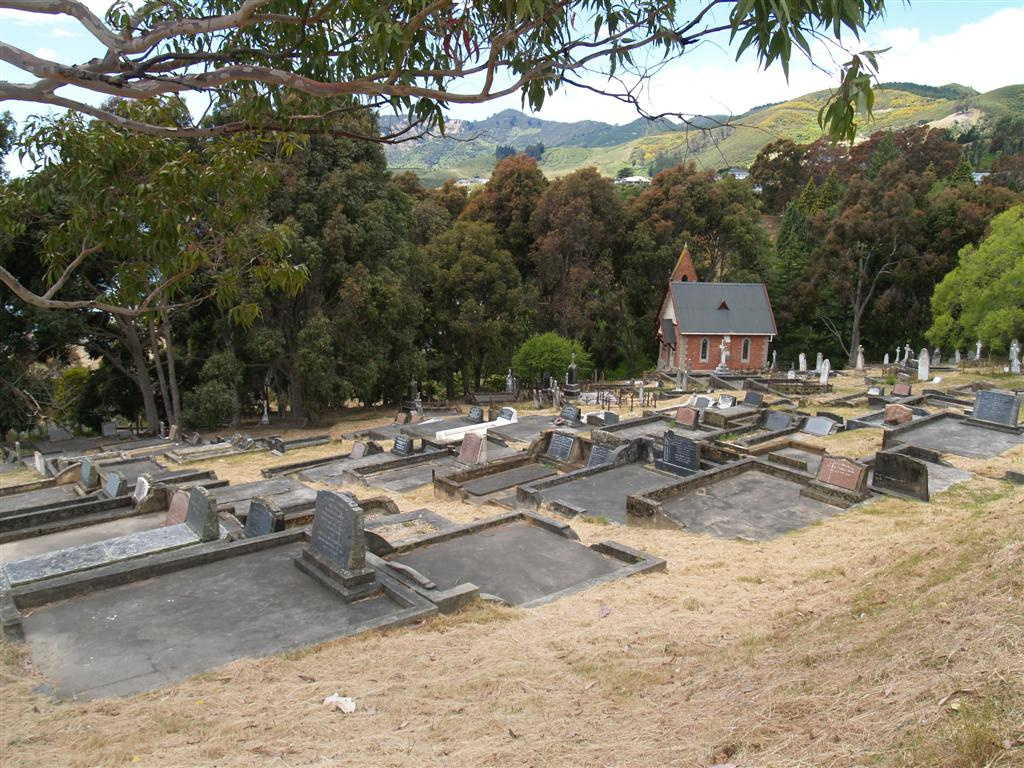
The Garin Memorial Chapel and many graves

Wakapuaka Cemetery is located at the southern end of Atawhai Drive in Nelson. The cemetery is located on a hill with a north west aspect. Therefore, the cemetery looks over the Nelson Haven, the Boulder Bank, Tasman Bay / Te Tai-o-Aorere, and Nelson city.

== History ==
The area was first designated a cemetery zone on 18 November 1861. The first burial was conducted on the 9 December 1861. The first person buried was Grace Annie who was 16 months old. The crematorium was erected in 1945 and has been extended since this date. There is a small chapel, the Garin Memorial Chapel Dedicated to St. Michael also on this site. The Wakapuaka Cemetery now covers an area of 140,000 square metres. Over 16000 people have been buried in the cemetery. There are many notable people buried in this cemetery, including the victims of the Maungatapu murders. The cemetery is easily accessed and is currently a registered walk of Nelson.

== Notable people ==
Notable people buried at Wakapuaka Cemetery include the following:

- Thomas Brunner (1821–1874), explorer of the Nelson and West Coast districts
- Arthur Collins (1832–1911), member of Parliament
- Joseph Dodson (c.1811–1890), first mayor of Nelson
- Charles Fell, (1844–1918), mayor of Nelson
- Adrian Hayter (1914–1990), soldier, sailor, Antarctic expedition leader and author
- James Hayter (1917–2006), flying ace of the Second World War
- Joseph Levien (c.1810–1876), second mayor of Nelson
- William Lightband (1834–1909), gold miner, tanner, and orchardist
- Richard Reeves (1836–1910), member of Parliament and the Legislative Council
- William Wells (1810–1893), member of Parliament

== War graves ==
Buried in the cemetery are eight Commonwealth service personnel from World War I and 22 from World War II. There is also a Commonwealth War Graves Commission plaque commemorating a cremated serviceman from the latter war.

== Garin Memorial Chapel ==
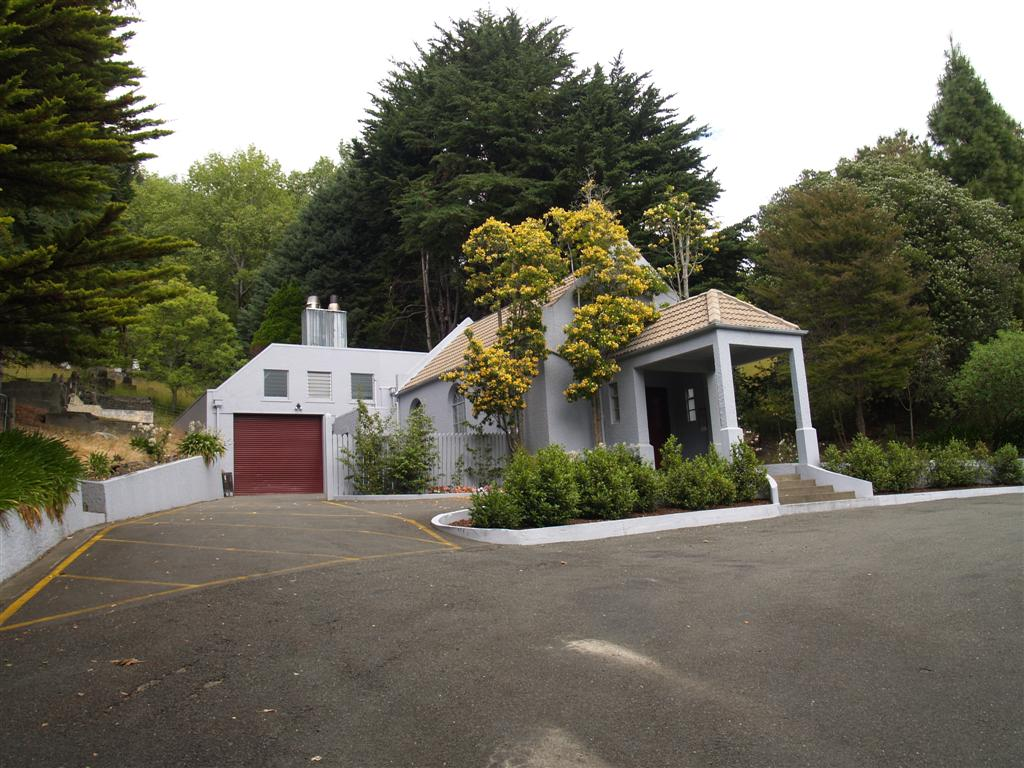
The Wakapuaka Crematorium

The Garin Memorial Chapel is dedicated to the first Catholic priest who served in Nelson, Antoine Marie Garin. He served 48 years in New Zealand, and never returned to his home in France. The chapel was completed in October 1890. The chapel is seven metres (23 ft) long and has a width of five metres (16 ft). The stone was sourced from Canterbury and Otago. Somerville designed the chapel. Father Garin is buried in the chapel's crypt.
