= Boulder Bank Lighthouse =

Lighthouse in Nelson, New Zealand

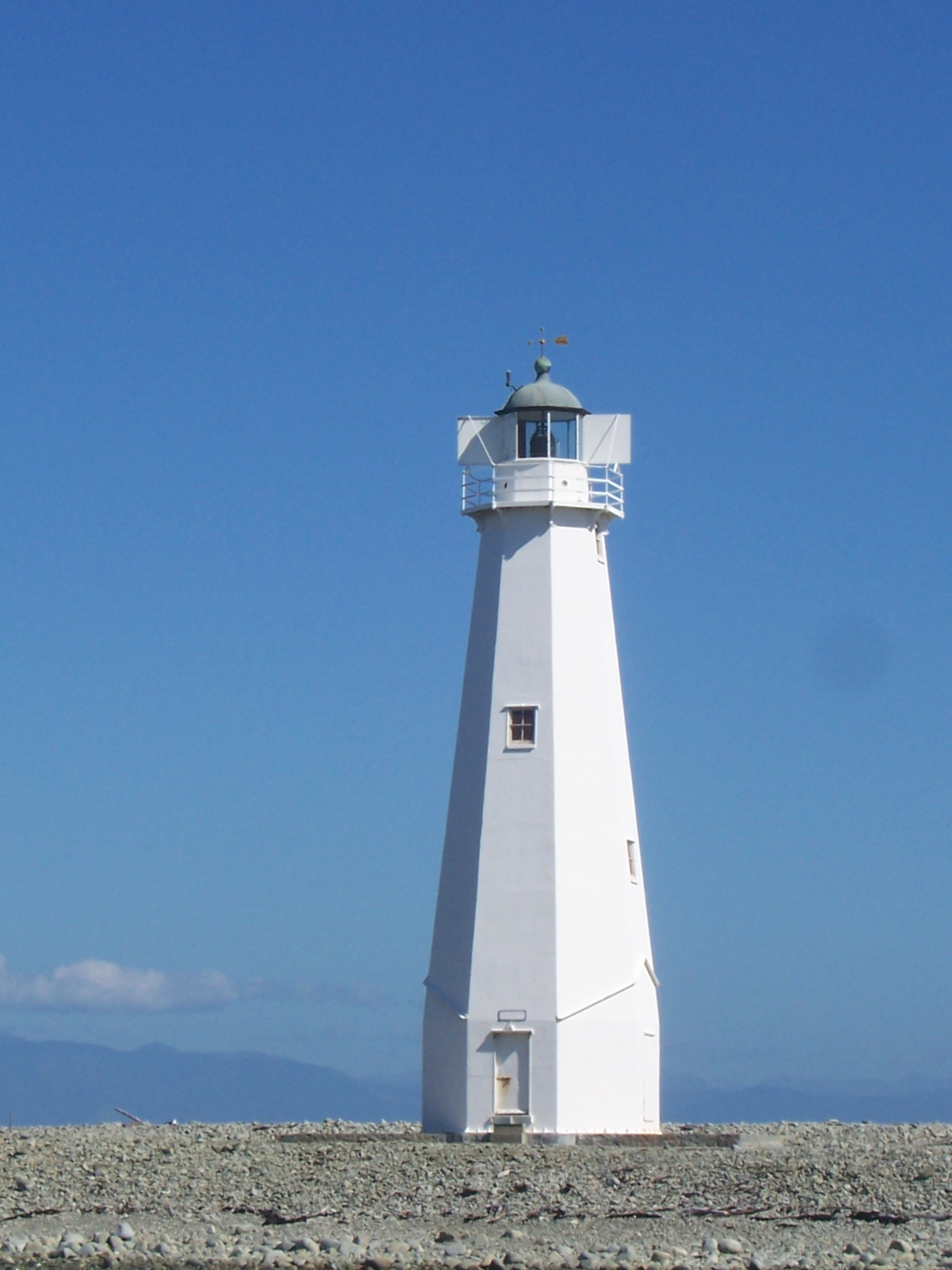
- The lighthouse in 2004
- Location: Boulder Bank, Nelson City, New Zealand
- Coordinates: 41°15′17″S 173°15′55″E

Tower
- Constructed: 1862
- Automated: 1915
- Height: 18 m (59 ft)

Light
- Deactivated: 1982

Heritage New Zealand – Category 1
- Designated: 23 June 1983
- Reference no.: 41

Boulder Bank Lighthouse is a decommissioned 19th century lighthouse located near the Port Nelson end of the Boulder Bank. It was New Zealand's second permanent lighthouse.

Prior to its construction, the Nelson harbour entrance, with its four-metre tidal range and narrow curved channel, was a trap to unwary ship's captains. The octagonal cast-iron tower was manufactured in sections by Stothert & Pitt, an engineering firm from Bath, England, in 1859 at a cost of £2,824 (equivalent to £306,775 as of 2025). It was then shipped to New Zealand on board the Glenshee, and was erected in 1862.

It is registered with Heritage New Zealand as a category I structure with registration number 41.

The lighthouse was lit for 120 years, from 1862 until 1982. It was given a fresh coat of white paint in October 2018. Its perch on the natural breakwater makes it popular with tourists. Today, it stands alone, but was not always so. When it was staffed by lighthouse keepers, a number of homes, other buildings and radio mast clustered around its base.

== See also ==
- List of lighthouses in New Zealand
