= Joseph Dodson =

New Zealand politician

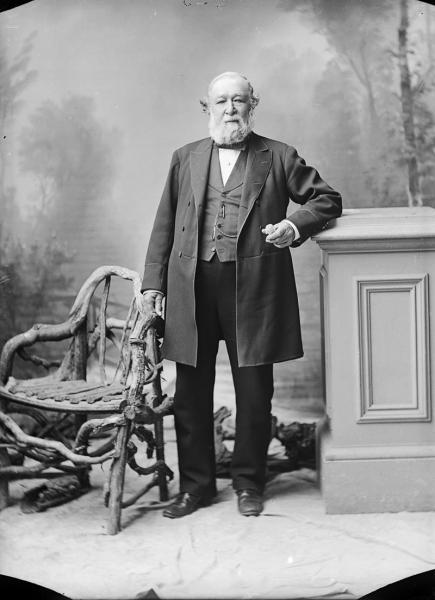
- Joseph Dodson

1st Mayor of Nelson, New Zealand
- In office 1 May 1874 – 8 January 1875
- In office 16 December 1877 – 22 November 1881

Personal details
- Born: 1811 or 1812
- Died: 12 October 1890 Nelson
- Resting place: Wakapuaka Cemetery; 41.25771°S 173.30337°E
- Relations: Henry Dodson (brother)
- Profession: Brewer

Joseph Reid Dodson JP (1811/12 – 12 October 1890), was the first Mayor of Nelson in New Zealand from 1874. He was a prominent brewer and Resident Magistrate in Nelson and his sixth generation descendants still operate a brewery in the city.

== Early life ==
Dodson was originally from England. He arrived in Nelson on 16 May 1854 from Melbourne in Australia on the brig Return (via Wellington). Within days, he bought a share of a Nelson brewery. Soon afterwards, he returned to Melbourne to sort out his business affairs. He returned with his wife and four children on the Marchioness, arriving on 27 September 1854.

== Professional career ==
After his first arrival from Melbourne, Dodson bought the shares of the late Dr Renwick in the Hooper & Co brewery. In 1855, he established the Raglan Brewery and leased Charles Harley's Bridge Street Brewery. In 1860, he sold his brewery shares and went back to England with his family for six years. On his return to Nelson, he brought farming equipment with him and established himself as a reseller of these goods. Once he was established, he took up a shareholding in Hooper & Co again.

In 1884, Dodson suffered a significant loss with the death of his business partner of 30 years, George Hooper. Dodson took over Hooper's shareholding, and the name of the brewery changed to J. R. Dodson & Son. His son Henry had joined the business in 1879. Henry Duncan joined them in 1888; he was the son of Joseph Dodson's daughter Mary-Ann.

Descendants of Henry Duncan have continued brewing. His great-grandchildren Matt Duncan and Callum Duncan now operate a boutique brewery of international acclaim. Founders Brewery, established in 1999, was the first fully certified organic brewery in the southern hemisphere. They have twice won the award of Champion Small Brewery at the Australian International Beer Awards.

== Political career ==
Dodson was former member of the Board of Works. He was elected a Councillor, possibly in 1874, and elected by his fellow Councillors as Mayor at a Council meeting on 1 May 1874. He was appointed Justice of the Peace in 1874.

Dodson did not receive a salary as Mayor although he entertained visiting dignitaries at his own expense, such as the Governor Sir James Fergusson on behalf of the city. This provoked some debate in the local papers about the behaviour of the Provincial Superintendent in comparison.

During his term negotiations began with the local Gas Works, a Provincial Government owned facility, for gas lighting for the city. In September 1874 the Council sought to employ the first town clerk and rate collector.

On 16 December 1874 Dodson was reconfirmed as Mayor for 1875. The council was in conflict with the provincial government over finances. Nelson went bankrupt, the mayor resigned on 8 January 1875, and so did most of the councillors. A special meeting of the remaining Councillors was held on 12 January 1875 to appoint a new Mayor but no one was forthcoming. A public meeting was held on the Friday to determine the wishes of the ratepayers. In mid February, seven people stood for Council and since that was the number of vacancies, they were declared elected. At a council meeting on 26 February, a new mayor was elected and Joseph Levien accepted the position.

Dodson served a second period as mayor, from 16 December 1877 until he retired on 22 November 1881. This was described as a 'happier term'. The city hosted another Governor during this term, The Lord Rosmead. Also during his term, Dodson and the Council lobbied Government to extend the existing railway and link it to the main line at Blenheim. When Dodson retired as Mayor, Edward Everett was elected in his place.

== Death ==
Dodson died on 12 October 1890 in Nelson, aged 78 years. He was buried at Wakapuaka Cemetery on 14 October.

Political offices
New office	Mayor of Nelson; 1874–1875; 1877–1881	Succeeded by Joseph Levien
Preceded by William Waters	Mayor of Nelson; 1874–1875; 1877–1881	Succeeded by Edward William Everett
