= Brooklands, Nelson =

Suburb in the north of Nelson, New Zealand

Brooklands
- Suburb
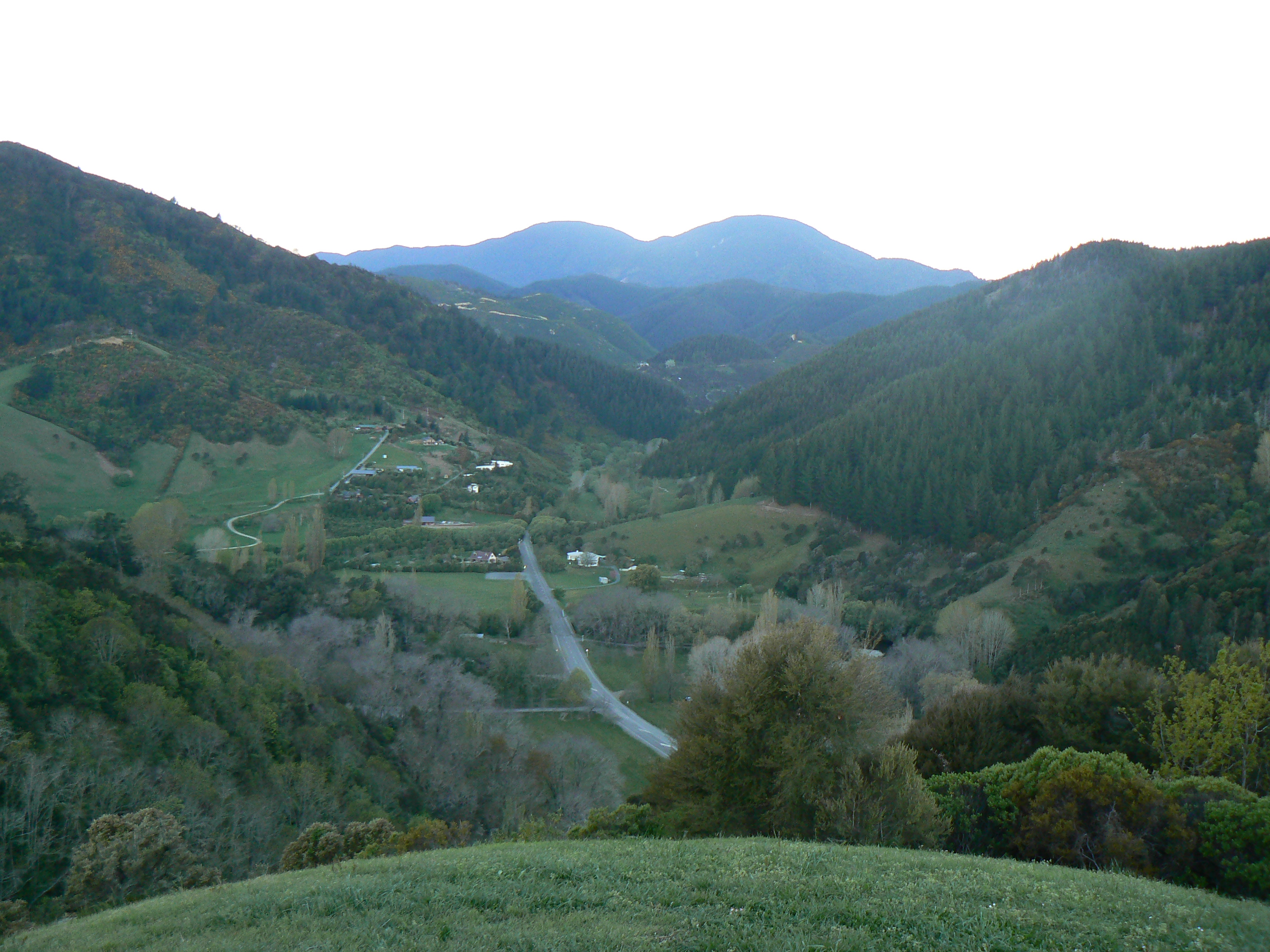
- View from the Centre of New Zealand
- Interactive map of Brooklands
- Coordinates: 41°15′20″S 173°18′10″E
- Country: New Zealand
- Region: Nelson
- Ward: Central General Ward; Whakatū Māori Ward
- Electorates: Nelson; Te Tai Tonga (Māori)

Government
  - Territorial Authority: Nelson City Council
  - Nelson City Mayor: Nick Smith
  - Nelson MP: Rachel Boyack
  - Te Tai Tonga MP: Tākuta Ferris

Area
  - Total: 1.73 km^{2} (0.67 sq mi)

Population (2023 census)
  - Total: 987
  - Density: 571/km^{2} (1,480/sq mi)
- Time zone: UTC+12 (NZST)
  - Summer (DST): UTC+13 (NZDT)

Brooklands is a suburb in the north of Nelson, New Zealand. It lies on State Highway 6 on the shore of Nelson Haven, between Atawhai and central Nelson. Nelson's largest cemetery, Wakapuaka Cemetery, is located in Brooklands.

== Demographics ==
Brooklands covers 1.73 km^{2} (0.67 sq mi). It is part of the larger Atawhai statistical area.

Historical population
Year	Pop.	±% p.a.
2006	888	—
2013	918	+0.48%
2018	1,014	+2.01%
2023	987	−0.54%

Brooklands had a population of 987 in the 2023 New Zealand census, a decrease of 27 people (−2.7%) since the 2018 census, and an increase of 69 people (7.5%) since the 2013 census. There were 486 males, 504 females, and 3 people of other genders in 420 dwellings. 1.2% of people identified as LGBTIQ+. There were 123 people (12.5%) aged under 15 years, 90 (9.1%) aged 15 to 29, 429 (43.5%) aged 30 to 64, and 330 (33.4%) aged 65 or older.

People could identify as more than one ethnicity. The results were 93.3% European (Pākehā); 7.9% Māori; 0.3% Pasifika; 3.3% Asian; 0.9% Middle Eastern, Latin American and African New Zealanders (MELAA); and 2.4% other, which includes people giving their ethnicity as "New Zealander". English was spoken by 98.8%, Māori by 1.5%, and other languages by 9.4%. No language could be spoken by 1.2% (e.g. too young to talk). New Zealand Sign Language was known by 0.6%. The percentage of people born overseas was 27.7, compared with 28.8% nationally.

Religious affiliations were 28.3% Christian, 0.9% Hindu, 0.3% Islam, 0.3% Buddhist, 0.3% New Age, and 1.2% other religions. People who answered that they had no religion were 62.3%, and 6.4% of people did not answer the census question.

Of those at least 15 years old, 315 (36.5%) people had a bachelor's or higher degree, 411 (47.6%) had a post-high school certificate or diploma, and 114 (13.2%) people exclusively held high school qualifications. 108 people (12.5%) earned over $100,000 compared to 12.1% nationally. The employment status of those at least 15 was 339 (39.2%) full-time, 147 (17.0%) part-time, and 12 (1.4%) unemployed.
