= Marchioness (ship) =

Coordinates: 39.28°S 173.74°E

History

United Kingdom
- Name: Marchioness
- Namesake: The wife of a marquess
- Builder: Waterford
- Launched: 1851
- Fate: Foundered 1864

General characteristics
- Tons burthen: Old Act: 208 (bm); New Act (post 1836): 176 (bm)
- Length: 91 ft 7 in (27.9 m)
- Beam: 20 ft 0 in (6.1 m)
- Depth: 13 ft 0 in (4.0 m)

Marchioness was a brigantine built at Waterford, Ireland in 1851 and registered at Melbourne that sailed between Nelson, New Zealand and Melbourne, Australia in the 1850s. It foundered on rocks off the Taranaki coast in 1864 and was lost with no loss of life, having previously grounded twice, once off the coast of Victoria, Australia, and once in Cook Strait.

== First grounding ==
On 15 December 1852 the Marchioness under Captain Fowler sailed to Adelaide from Table Bay, near Cape Town. It then sailed on 22 February 1853 with 10,218 ounces of gold for Calcutta. By 1 August she was back in Cape Town preparing to return to Australia.

On 5 October 1853 under Captain Fowler while inward bound from the Cape of Good Hope, the Marchioness struck the Point Lonsdale Reef, Port Phillip heads. She was initially floated free, but was taking on water. She was then run ashore on Swan Island for repair.

Its next voyage from Melbourne was to Wellington on 3 February 1854. The ship would have been laid up at Melbourne being repaired and possibly refitted before sailing on the Tasman route. Ownership may also have changed.

On 29 July 1854 the Marchioness was in Wellington,

On 27 September 1854 the ship bought Nelson's first mayor, Joseph Dodson, his wife, and their four children to Nelson. On this journey under Captain Kreeft from Melbourne to Nelson the Marchioness sighted and talked to the barque Cordellia, which had its foremast sprung and jib boom gone. The Cordellia had sailed from London and was heading for Wellington, New Zealand. The Marchioness sailed for Wellington on 28 September.

On 12 May 1859 the Marchioness arrived in Melbourne from Lyttelton, via Nelson under Captain F C Kreeft. The paper described the ship as a 177-ton schooner.

== Second grounding ==
On 24 June 1859 the Marchioness was sailing through Cook Strait when a South Easterly gale came through. Finding the sea getting rougher and the weather threatening worse Captain Kreef sought shelter in the Marlborough Sounds. He had intended to anchor off Motuara Island until the storm passed. While heading into Queen Charlotte Sound for shelter the ship hit a submerged rock at 7 am and began taking on water. Kreef beached the ship in the Sounds' northernmost cove on the western side to prevent her from sinking. Shortly after this, at about 2pm, the Boomerang under Captain O'Rielly, which was also seeking shelter from the storm, found the Marchioness. Her passengers had erected a tent on the shore. Kreef was hopeful that the ship could be refloated despite 3 feet of water in her cabin. This proved uneconomic and the ship and its cargo was auctioned on 23 July 1859.

The purchasers refloated the Marchioness and refitted it. On 15 December 1860 they were advertising it as going to sail for Sydney under Commander Thomas Hinds.

In December 1862 the Marchioness was in Wellington, having sailed there from Australia.

== Wrecked ==
On 17 May 1864 under Captain R Smith the Marchioness was wrecked on the Taranaki coast about 25 miles (40 km) south of New Plymouth. No lives lost, which was made all the more remarkable by the fact that ship had been wrecked off shore from what was hostile territory. At the time it was the height of the Second Taranaki War.

The Marchioness had been at anchor in the roadstead at New Plymouth on 16 May. At about 7am she parted her cable as she was preparing to slip it. The wind was a strong northerly and the sea was getting very rough. After almost being caught on the nearby reef she managed to get safely out beyond the Sugar Loaves. During that day the wind shifted to a strong southerly.

During the night the wind increased in strength and shifted to a more westerly direction. At about 2:30 am she struck rocks of the Taranaki coast. Because the ship was light, having been unable to take a full load on board at New Plymouth, she had been blown closer to land than the crew had anticipated. The crew were now placed in a dilemma. The sea was breaking over her, there was blinding rain, and the nearby land was occupied by hostile Māori, who were engaged in a war against the settlers. In addition the nearby coast was very rocky and inhospitable.

The area where they were was not as rocky and at daybreak they found that they were 400 meters from shore. Three of the crew took a rope from the boat to shore, being followed by the remaining five. Here the next stage of their adventure began, because right in front of where they had landed, at the side of a stream, was a Māori pā. It was uninhabited, otherwise they could have been killed. The party then went along the beach back towards New Plymouth as stealthily as they could, at times walking below the cliffs where they could. Crossing probably the Hangatahua River, the Captain Smith lost the ships papers and log. Twelve hours after they began walking they reached Ōakura. It was 10pm. The sentry, not expecting any Europeans coming from their direction, fired. The shot missed and after the party identified themselves they were taken in.

At this time the Marchioness was owned by Warwick Weston of New Plymouth. It was insured for £2,000 by the New Zealand Insurance Company's office. The ship and its cargo were a write-off.
