= Bentley Brooklands =

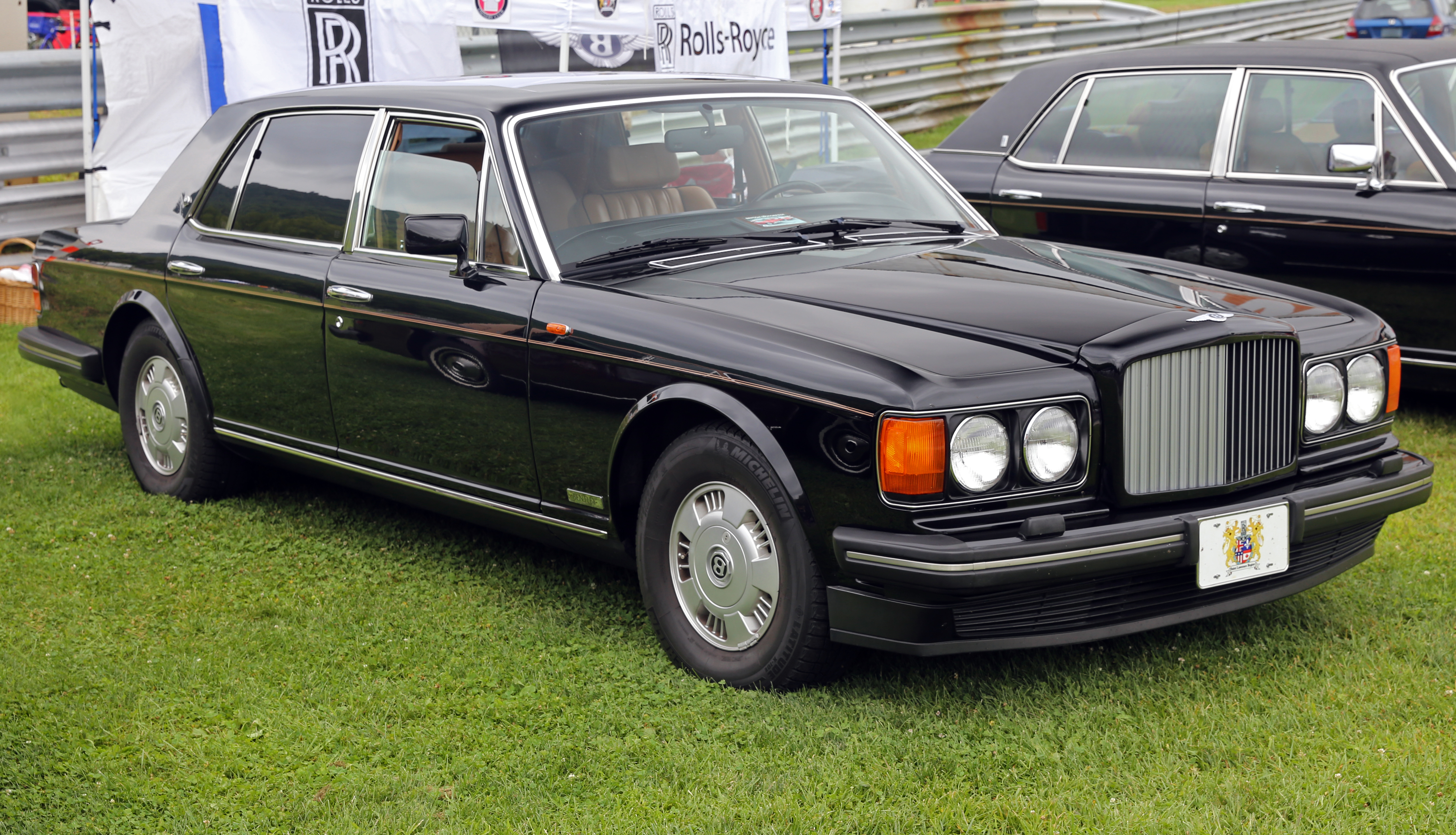
- 1995 Bentley Brooklands LWB

Overview
- Manufacturer: Bentley Motors
- Production: 1992–1998 (4-door saloon); 2008–2011 (2-door coupé)
- Model years: 1993–1998; 2008–2011
- Assembly: United Kingdom: Crewe, England (Bentley Crewe)

Body and chassis
- Class: 1992–1998: Full-size luxury car (F); 2008–2011: Grand tourer (S)
- Layout: Longitudinal, Front-engine, rear-wheel-drive

Bentley Brooklands is the name of two distinct models produced by British automobile manufacturer Bentley Motors. The first Brooklands was a full-size luxury saloon, launched in 1992 to replace the Bentley Mulsanne and in turn succeeded by the Bentley Arnage in 1998.

Bentley resurrected the nameplate in 2007 with the Brooklands Coupé, a 2-door, 4-seater hardtop coupé version of the Bentley Azure. It was made between 2008 and 2011 in limited numbers.

These cars were named after Brooklands, a banked race track in Surrey, where Bentley obtained some of its greatest triumphs in the 1920s and 1930s.

== Brooklands (1992–1998) ==
Bentley Brooklands
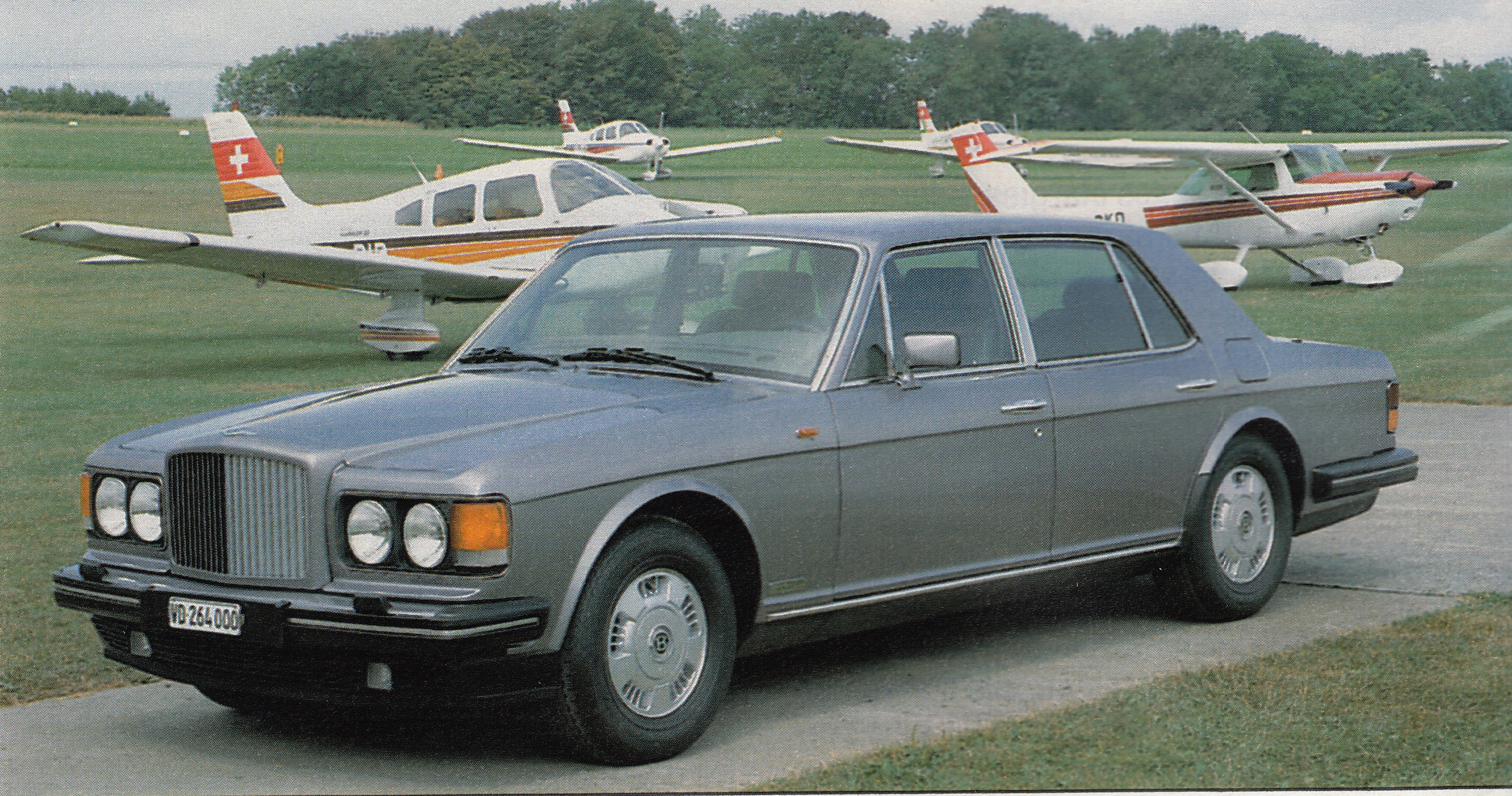

Overview
- Production: 1992–1998
- Model years: 1993–1998

Body and chassis
- Body style: 4-door saloon
- Related: Bentley Turbo R Rolls-Royce Silver Spirit

Powertrain
- Engine: 6.75 L Bentley V8; 6.75 L turbo Bentley V8 (since 1996)
- Transmission: 4-speed automatic

Dimensions
- Wheelbase: SWB: 3,061 mm (120.5 in); LWB: 3,162 mm (124.5 in)
- Length: 1992–1995 SWB: 207.5 in (5,270 mm); 1992–1995 SWB: 5,268 mm (207.4 in); 1996–1998 LWB: 211.8 in (5,380 mm); 1996–1998 LWB: 5,370 mm (211.4 in)
- Width: 1992–1995: 1,887 mm (74.3 in) (w/mirrors: 2,007 mm (79.0 in)); 1996–1998: 1,914 mm (75.4 in) (w/mirrors: 2,111 mm (83.1 in))
- Height: 1,486 mm (58.5 in)

Chronology
- Predecessor: Bentley Eight; Bentley Mulsanne S
- Successor: Bentley Arnage

The Bentley Brooklands was introduced in 1992 as a replacement for the Bentley Mulsanne S and Bentley Eight models. It was intended as a slightly less expensive alternative to the Bentley Turbo R, featuring the same styling, underpinnings and the Rolls-Royce 6.75-litre V8 engine, but initially without the more powerful model's turbocharger. A turbocharged version appeared in 1996.

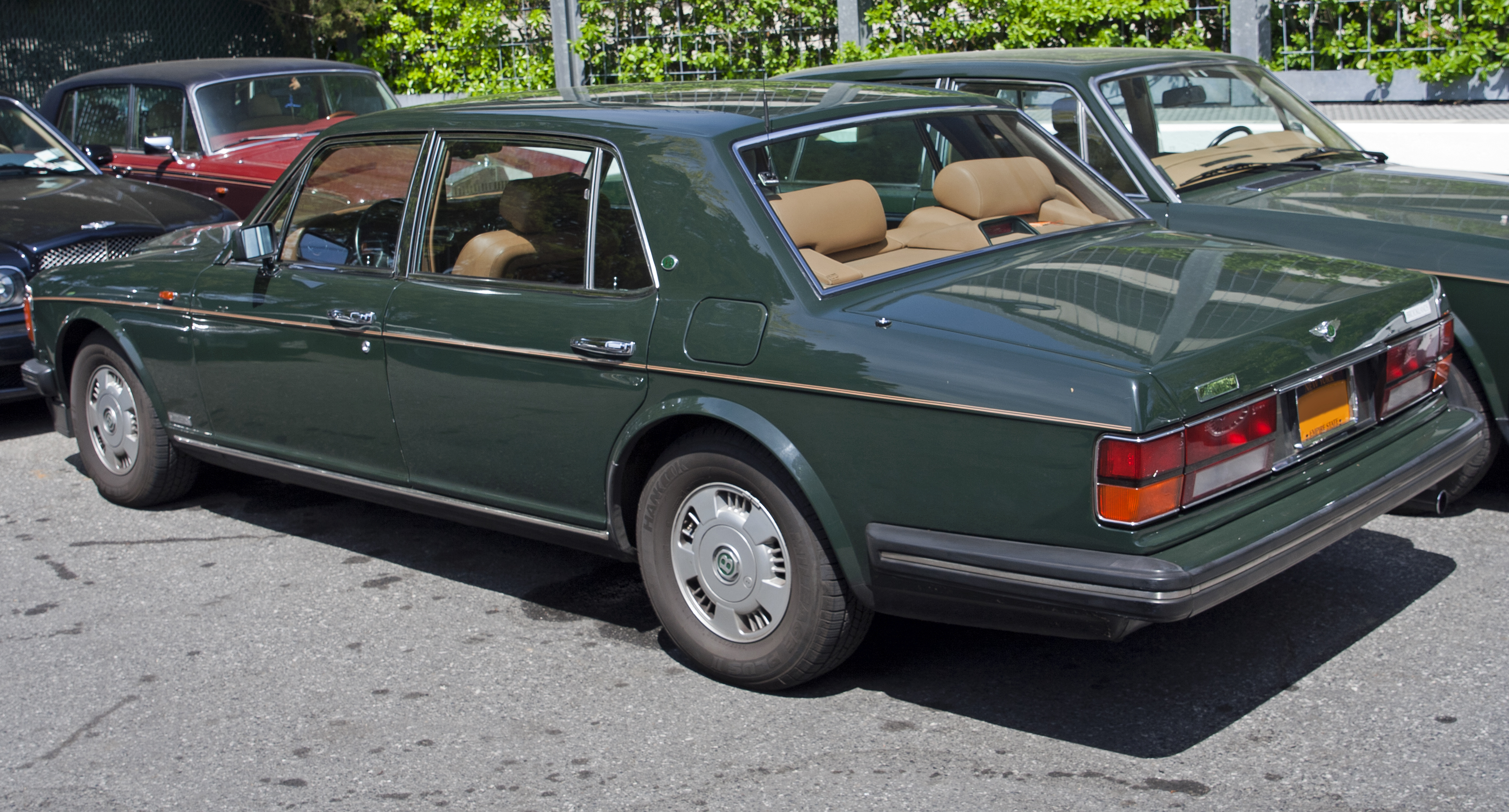
1993 Bentley Brooklands, rear view

The Brooklands continued Bentley's relatively angular design theme, which was also used on contemporary Rolls-Royce vehicles, throughout the 1980s and early 1990s. The exterior design featured the classic Bentley waterfall grille as well as dual headlights with wraparound parking lights. As in many Bentley and Rolls-Royce vehicles, the Brooklands also featured the trademark descending bootlid and chrome B-pillars.

The interior remained relatively unchanged from previous Bentley models, with more curvaceous design elements surrounding the leather-wrapped centre console. The steering wheel and interior door panels remained largely unchanged; the major change arrived in the form of relocating the gear selector to the centre console - for decades the standard practice among R-R and Bentley models utilised a steering column mounted selector. The interior continued to be surrounded by ample woodgrain which featured engraved, lighter-colored outlines on the door panels. In the U.S., prices for the Brooklands started at around $156,500.

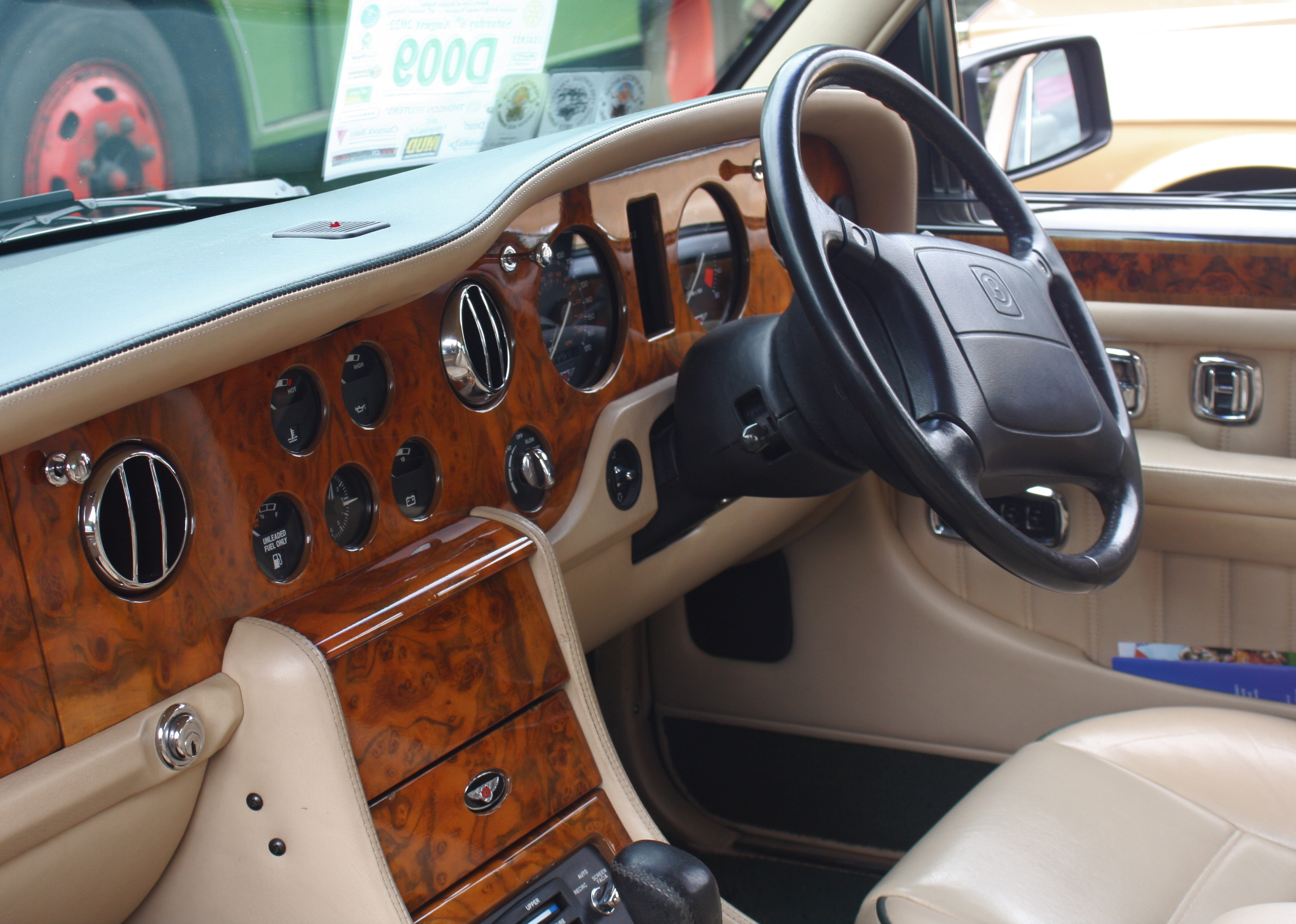
1995 Bentley Brooklands interior

=== Specifications ===
The 1992–1997 Brooklands was driven by a 6.75-litre Rolls-Royce V8 engine with a four-speed automatic transmission. The vehicle was rear-wheel drive, and featured independent front and rear suspension. While not as large as some other ultra-luxury cars, the Brooklands remained quite large, with a wheelbase of 3,162 millimetres (124.5 in) in LWB trim and 3,061 millimetres (120.5 in) in SWB trim.

=== 1996 update ===
In autumn of 1996, the Brooklands received an update in a form of light-pressure turbo, boosting power output to 300 bhp.

=== Brooklands R ===
In 1998, there also was a Brooklands R variant available, with suspension upgrade borrowed from Turbo R model and with a light-pressure turbo, that should be seen as a replacement for standard Brooklands. Cars were badged as 'Brooklands R'.

== Brooklands Coupé (2008–2011) ==
Bentley Brooklands Coupé
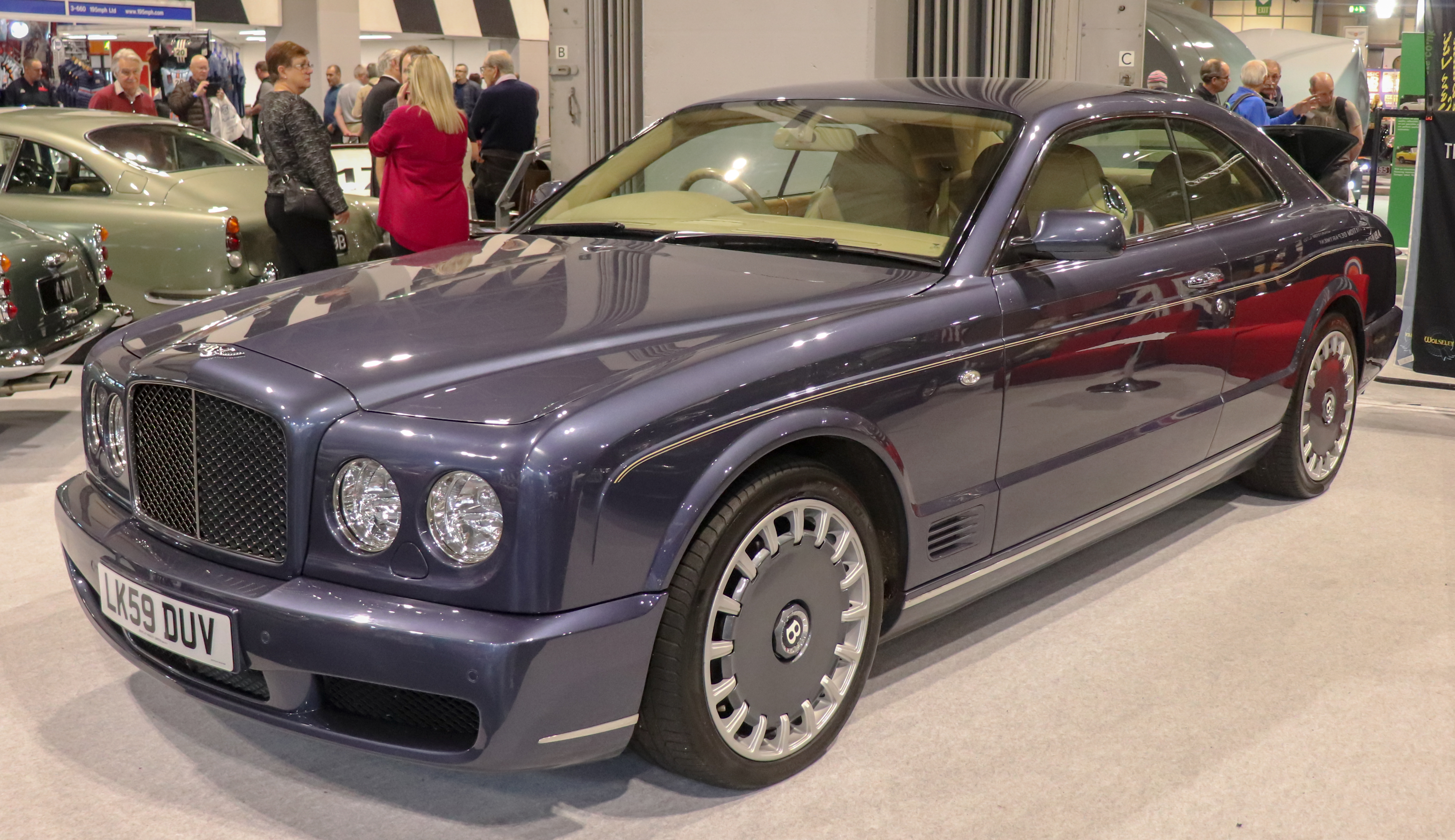

Overview
- Production: 2008–2011; 550 units
- Designer: Bentley design team under Dirk van Braeckel

Body and chassis
- Class: Grand tourer (S)
- Body style: 2-door hardtop coupé
- Related: Bentley Arnage; Bentley Azure

Powertrain
- Engine: 6.75 L twin-turbo Bentley L Series V8
- Transmission: 6-speed ZF automatic

Dimensions
- Wheelbase: 3,116 mm (122.7 in)
- Length: 5,411 mm (213.0 in)
- Width: 1,900 mm (74.8 in) (w/mirrors: 2,125 mm (83.7 in))
- Height: 1,473 mm (58.0 in)
- Kerb weight: 2,650.5 kg (5,843 lb)

Chronology
- Predecessor: Bentley Continental R Bentley Continental T

The Bentley Brooklands Coupé is a fixed-head version of the Bentley Azure (itself related to the Bentley Arnage), featuring a two-door, four-seater pillarless hardtop coupé body, eliminating the B-pillars. It was unveiled at the 2007 Geneva Motor Show, to be built for the 2008 model year. As a hand-assembled car made in very small numbers, employing traditional coach-building techniques and craftsmanship skills in wood and leather, the Brooklands Coupé was the true successor to the discontinued Bentley Continental R and T. Planned lifetime production was limited at 550 cars, and deliveries started in the first half of 2008.

=== Specifications ===
The Brooklands is powered by a 6.75-litre Bentley L Series twin-turbo OHV V8 engine, producing 530 bhp (395 kW; 537 PS) at 4,000 rpm and 1,050 N⋅m (774 lb⋅ft) at 3,250 rpm, at the time the highest torque ever developed by a production petrol V8 engine. The engine was linked to a reinforced 6-speed ZF torque converter automatic, with a Tiptronic manual gear selection function.

A carbon fibre-reinforced silicon carbide (C/SiC) ceramic composite braking system with 14-inch SGL Carbon brake discs was optional, with 20-inch wheels only.

=== Performance ===
- 0 to 60 mph (0 to 97 km/h): 5.0 seconds
- 0 to 100 km/h (0 to 62 mph): 5.3 seconds
- Top speed: 296 km/h (183.9 mph)
- 0 to 100 mph (0 to 161 km/h): 11.7 seconds
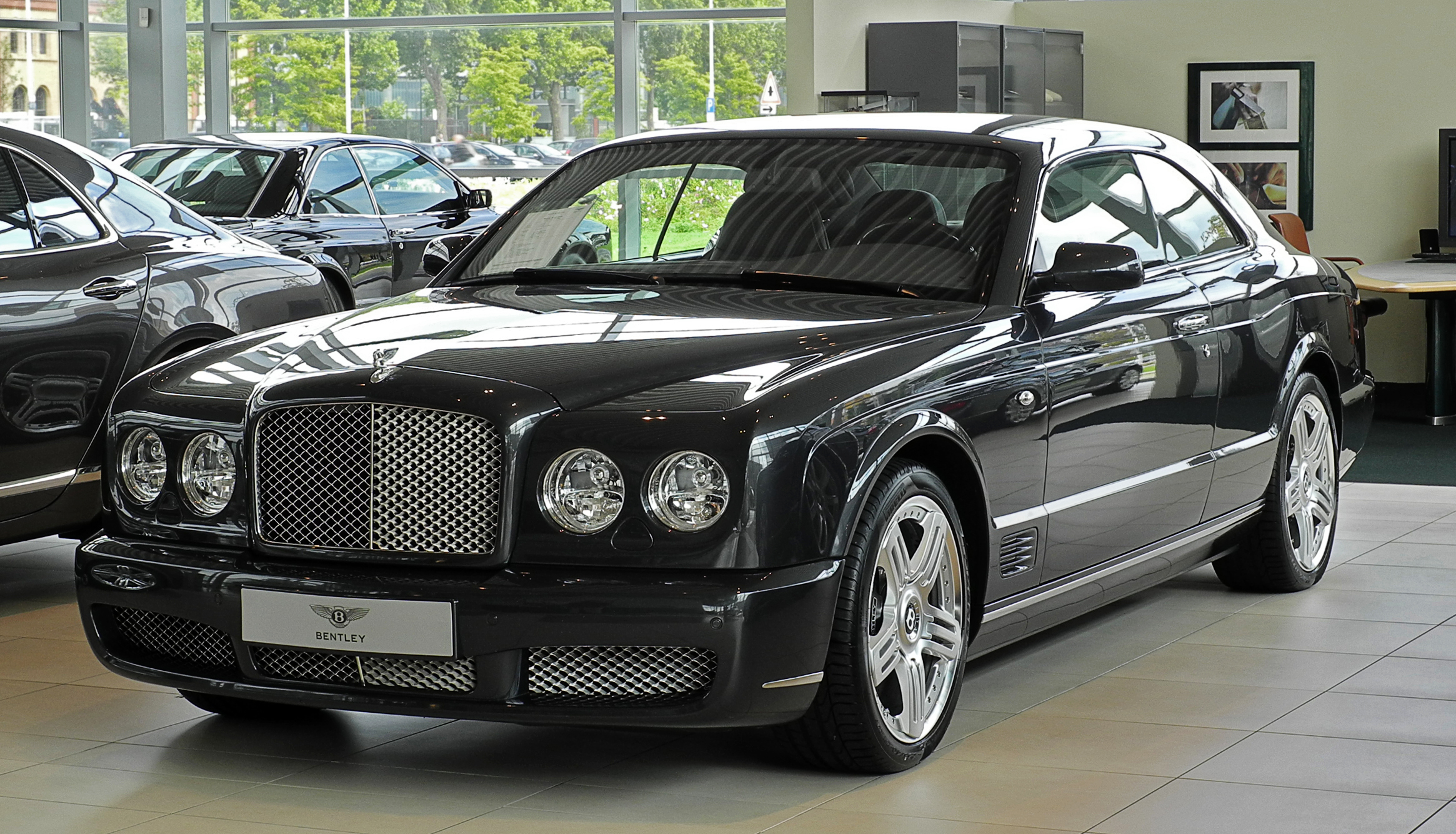
Front view

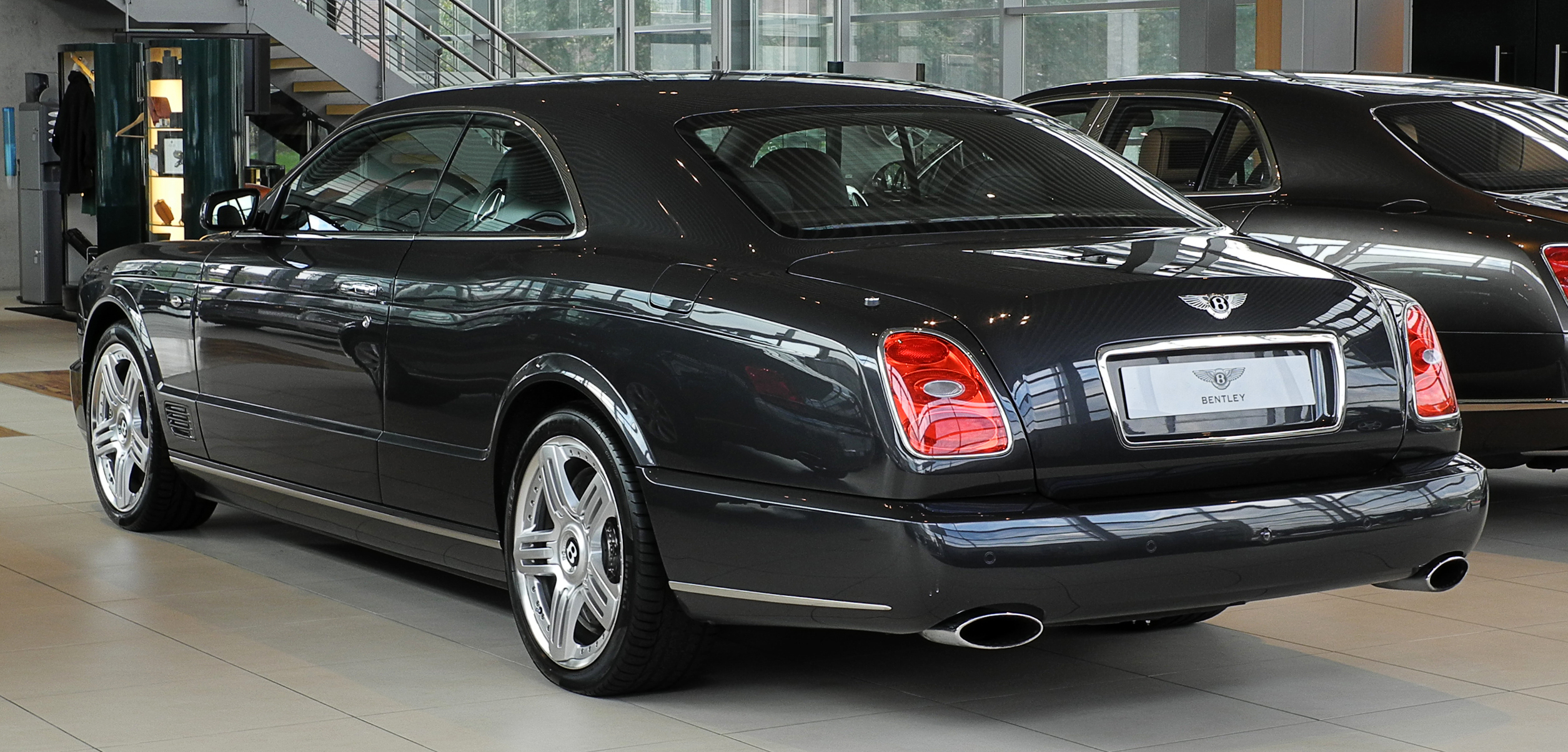
Rear view
