= Edward Everett (New Zealand politician) =

Mayor of Nelson, New Zealand (1821–1904)

Edward Everett (1821, Hackney, England – 1904, Nelson, New Zealand) was the Mayor of Nelson in the 19th century for two periods.

== Political career ==
As a Councillor, Everett was named as one of several Councillors who voted for the appointment of Joseph Levien in 1875.

Everett was the third Mayor of Nelson, replacing Joseph Levien who died in office. Everett was elected unopposed on 16 June 1876. He was appointed as a Justice of the Peace on 6 July 1876.

On 8 December 1876 Councillor Pickering, on behalf of all the Councillors expressed gratitude to the Mayor for his ability to interpret the Acts of Parliament that controlled the council's proceedings and conducting the finances of the corporation. Pickering then asked Everett to retain the position of Mayor for a further year. Everett responded by saying that he preferred the office to be a rolling one with the holder being changed annually. This reluctance must have been overcome as it was announced by 23 December that Everett had been elected unopposed for a further term.

Everett represented Nelson at the conference of municipal delegates in Wellington in August 1877.

Also in August, Everett sought financial assistance for the passengers rescued from the ship Queen Bee from other mayors.

The City Council was required to have fresh elections on 13 September 1877. However, just prior to the election, on 1 September Everett announced his intention to retire from the Mayoralty. In its editorial, The Nelson Evening Mail expressed the hope that Everett could be induced to reconsider because he had undertaken his responsibilities in a thorough and earnest manner. The editorial noted that unlike many Councils he had maintained good relations between himself and Council. In the interim William Waters had taken over the mayoral responsibilities in Everett's place.

Elections were held on 13 September 1877 with Everett being returned as a Councillor with the most votes (347), followed by Gray (337), Levien (331), Little (326), Hopper (299), Webb (274), Bethwaite (273), Tutty (261), Pickering (229), and Harley (207). Everett remained as a Councillor.

Everett was still a Councillor when Joseph Dodson resigned as mayor on 22 November 1881. Waters' fellow Councillors prevailed upon Everett to be Mayor for a further term. He agreed and was elected unopposed.

Political offices
Preceded by Joseph Levien	Mayor of Nelson; 1876–1877; 1881–1882	Succeeded by William Waters
Preceded by Joseph Dodson	Mayor of Nelson; 1876–1877; 1881–1882	Succeeded by Charles Fell
