= William Waters (mayor) =

Mayor of Nelson, New Zealand

William Ridd Waters JP (died 1881) was mayor of Nelson in New Zealand from 1 September 1877 to 19 December 1877 and a city councillor.

== Private life ==
Waters was a migrant to Nelson where he started a boot and shoe making business in Bridge Street in early 1858.

He was also a member of the Ancient Order of Foresters Benefit Society, being treasurer of the Court of Robin Hood for almost 15 years. He was noted as being interested in the welfare of others. Because of this interest, despite ill health, he stood for the city council and was elected a councillor.

== Political career ==
On 1 September 1877 Edward Everett announced his resignation as mayor. Reluctantly Waters agreed to be Mayor for the remainder of Everett's term.

During Waters' term as mayor, he oversaw the fundraising in Nelson for the Indian Famine Relief Fund, which was prompted by a telegram from the Lord Mayor of London to the mayors of New Zealand. Four hundred pounds was raised.

On 19 December 1877 the council elected Joseph Dodson as mayor.

Waters died at Nelson following an incurable illness, on 6 February 1881. Waters' father, Benjamin Waters, outlived him and died at Cambridge, England on 12 December 1886 aged 82.

Political offices
Preceded by Edward Everett	Mayor of Nelson; 1877	Succeeded by Joseph Dodson
