= Edward Everett (artist) =

British-American painter

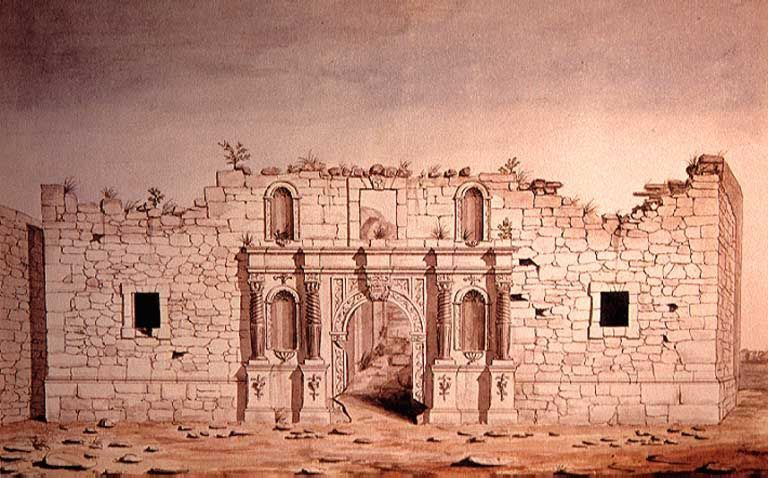
- "Ruins of the Church of the Alamo, San Antonio de Bexar" by Edward Everett, ink and watercolor on paper, 1847
- Born: March 13, 1818; London
- Died: July 24, 1903 (aged 85); Roxbury, Massachusetts
- Resting place: Forest Hills Cemetery; 42.295°N 71.106°W
- Known for: Painting, drawing
- Spouse: Mary A. Billings
- Patrons: United States Army

Edward Everett (1818 – 1903) was an Anglo-American artist.

Everett was born in London, England, on March 13, 1818. His father was American and in 1840 moved to Quincy, Illinois, in the United States, as did Edward. By his twenties, Everett had shown considerable aptitude for drawing. It's not known whether or where Everett received formal artistic training, but his landscape sketches resemble the Hudson River School. Despite his skill, Everett considered himself a draftsman and mechanical engineer rather than a fine artist.

Everett joined the Army in 1843 and fought at the Battle of Nauvoo in the Illinois Mormon War. In June 1846 his unit was reorganized for the Mexican–American War and, as part of General Wool's Center Division, arrived that summer at San Antonio to guard supplies. Everett, then a sergeant, served as a provost officer (military policeman) and on September 11, 1846, was badly wounded in the knee by a gunshot fired by a civilian while breaking up a disturbance, a wound from which he never fully recovered and which left him unfit for field duty.

While recuperating, Everett made many drawings of San Antonio and the surrounding area (including the Alamo), some of which are displayed at the Amon Carter Museum. He also wrote letters and kept journals and wrote official reports, all of which are preserved and later wrote a lengthy memoir.

Everett later worked for a few years in Washington, D.C., and then returned to Illinois. He married Mary A. Billings on October 7, 1857. During the American Civil War, Everett served as an Assistant Quartermaster for the State of Illinois, with the rank of Major. He later moved to Ossining, New York, and then Roxbury, Massachusetts, where he died on July 24, 1903.

== Publications ==
- Everett, Edward (1906). A Narrative of Military Experience in Several Capacities. Illinois State Historical Society.
- Hughes, George W. (1850). Memoir Descriptive of the March of a Division of the United States Army, under the Command of Brigadier General John E. Wool, from San Antonio de Bexar, in Texas, to Saltillo, in Mexico (Senate Executive Document 32, 31st Congress, 1st Session). Washington, D. C.: Government Printing Office. Line drawings by Edward Everett, lithographs by C.B. Graham based on watercolors by Edward Everett, see Dorothy Sloan for descriptive details.
