= Boulder Bank =

Coastal landform in Nelson, New Zealand

Coordinates: 41°14′04″S 173°17′47″E

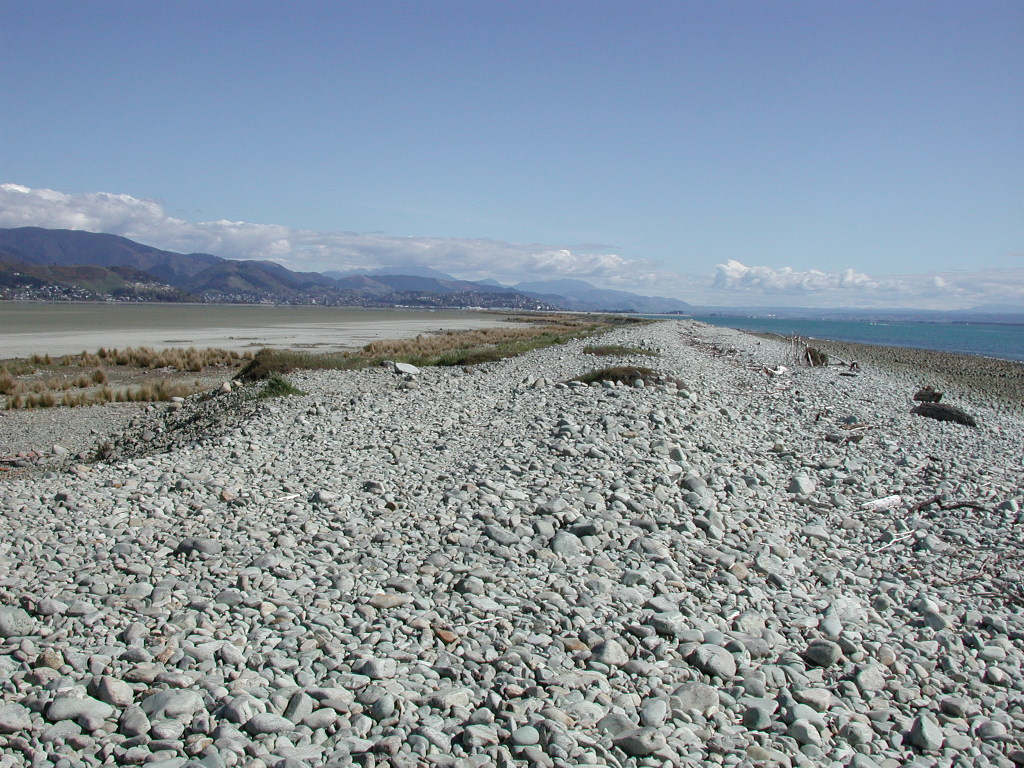
Start of the Boulder Bank at Mackay Bluff with Nelson in the distance

The Boulder Bank (Māori: Te Taero a Keropa or Te Tāhuna o Tama-i-ea) is a very unusual naturally formed landform in Nelson, New Zealand. It is a 13 km (8.1 mi) long stretch of rocky substrate which begins at the Mackay Bluff and ends at the Cut of the Nelson Harbour. Haulashore Island was once a part of the Boulder Bank, but the Cut made it an island, and it is no longer connected to the Boulder Bank. The Boulder Bank separates Tasman Bay and the Nelson Haven and is managed as a scenic reserve by the Department of Conservation. Land access is gained along Boulder Bank Drive, signposted at the northern end of Nelson Haven on State Highway 6.

== Geology and geography ==
The Boulder Bank is composed of granodiorite. The source of this rock is Mackay Bluff. It is still debated what process or processes have resulted in this odd structure. Longshore drift, however, is the most accepted hypothesis for creation. The main objection to longshore drift as the explanation is that Tasman Bay does not receive enough wave action to move the large boulders in a south-westerly direction. Studies have been conducted since 1892 to determine speed of boulder movement. Rates of the top course gravel movement have been estimated at 7.5 m (25 ft) a year.

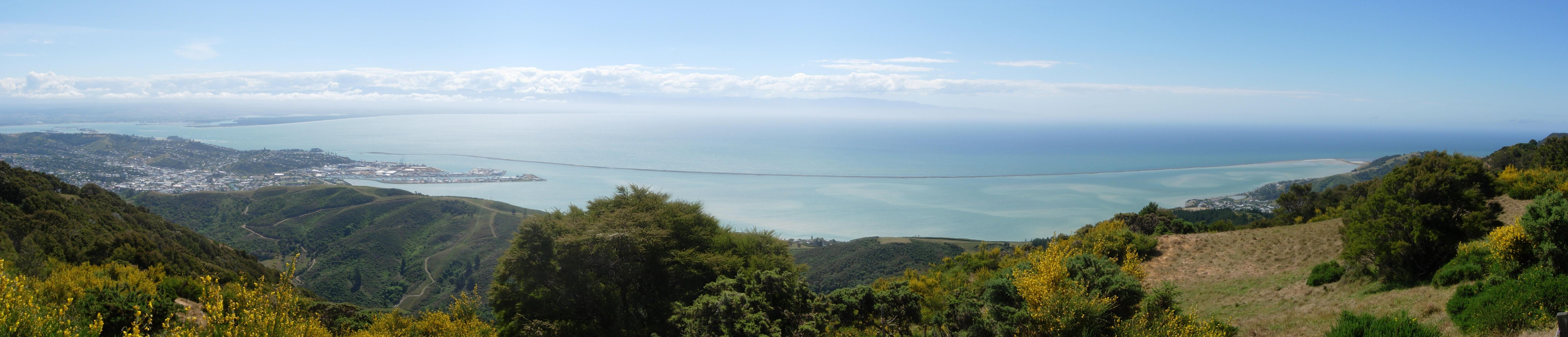
Boulder Bank panorama from Kaka Hill, December 2007

== The Cut ==
The Cut was made to enable the Nelson port to allow the increasing demands of sea transport for the Tasman area. Construction started in 1903 and in 1905 a 61 m (200 ft) wide entrance was operational. Today the Cut is 150 m (490 ft) wide and dredged every six months to maintain a depth of 10 m (33 ft).

== Lighthouse ==
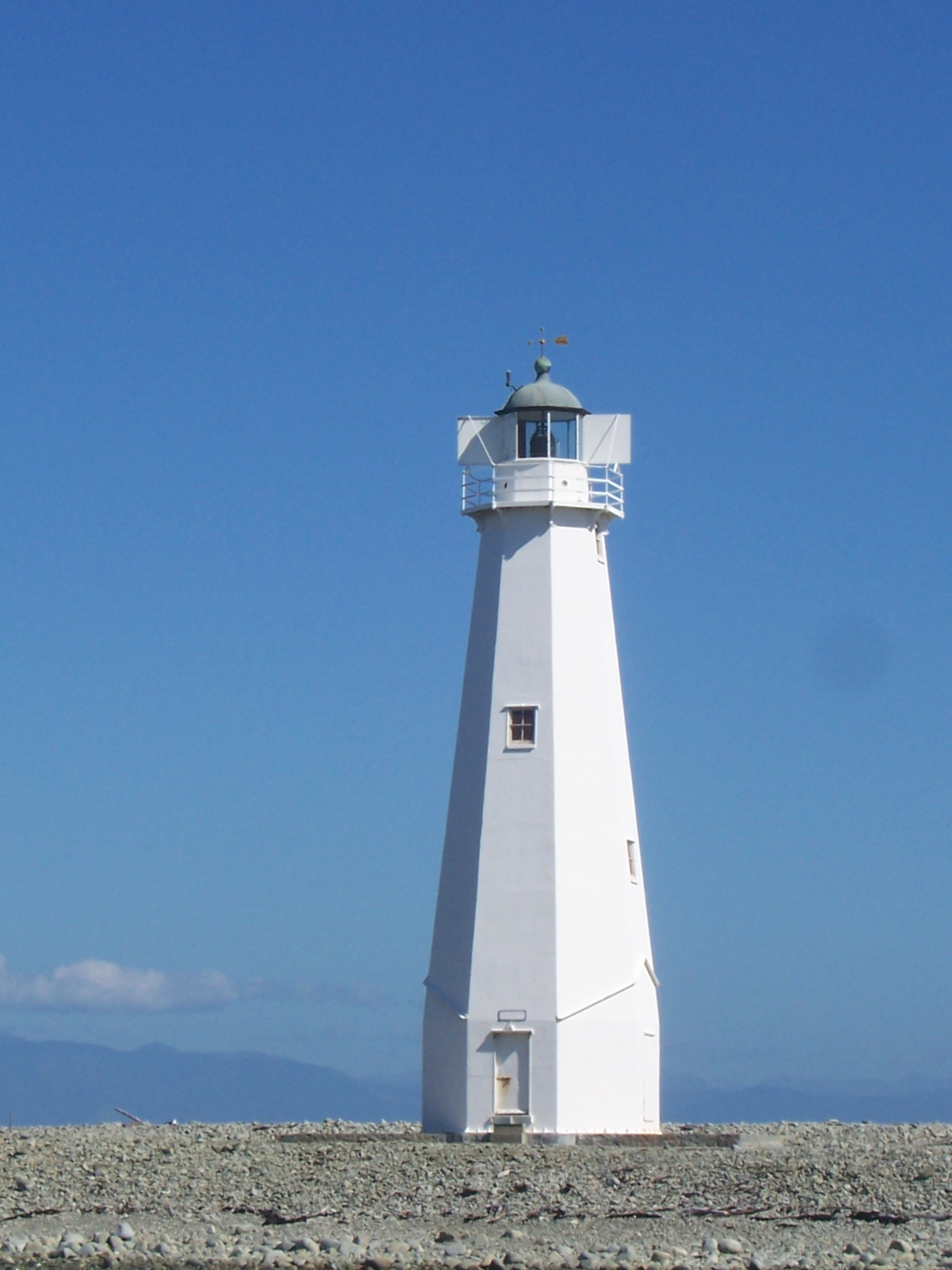
Boulder Bank Lighthouse was the country's second permanent lighthouse.

The Boulder Bank Lighthouse was erected in 1862. It is located near the port end of the Boulder Bank and was New Zealand's second permanent lighthouse. It is registered with the Historic Places Trust as a category I structure with registration number 41.
