= Nelson Haven =

Estuary and mudflat in Nelson, New Zealand

Coordinates: 41°14′24″S 173°18′18″E

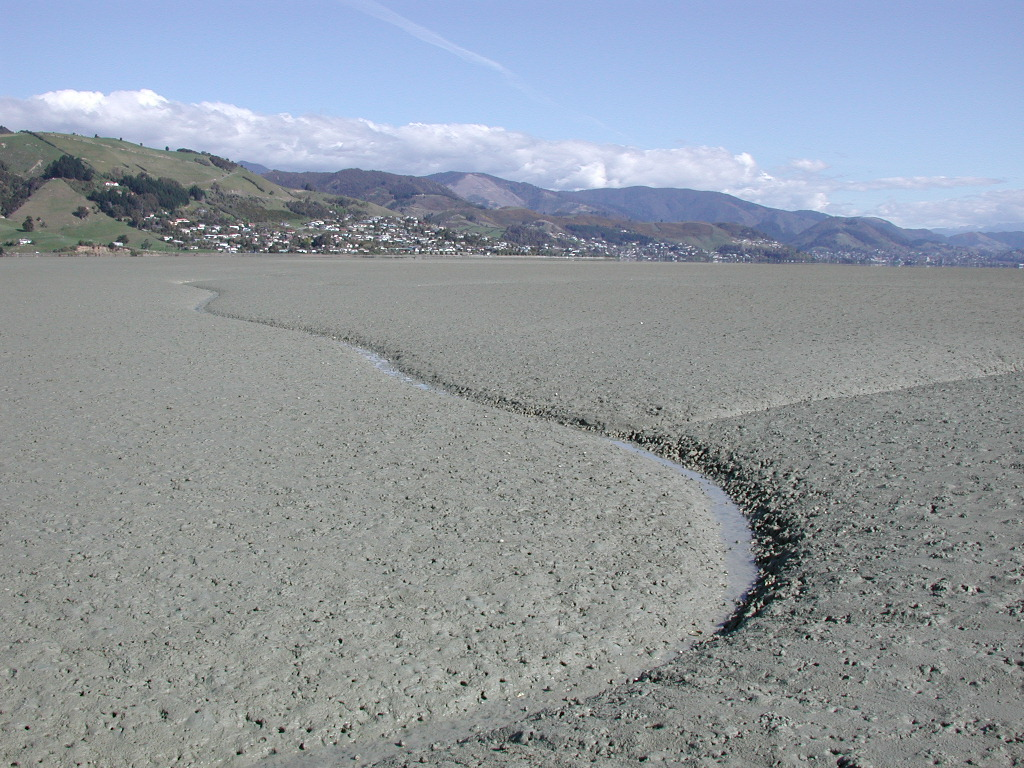
Water channels in Nelson Haven

Nelson Haven is an estuary with coastal salt marsh and mudflats, northeast of Nelson, New Zealand. It is separated from Tasman Bay / Te Tai-o-Aorere by the Boulder Bank. It is over 8 km long and up to 2 km wide. The area is regularly completely drowned and exposed by tidal action and supports a large population of mud crabs.
