= Winter 2025 New Zealand floods =

Winter 2025 floods
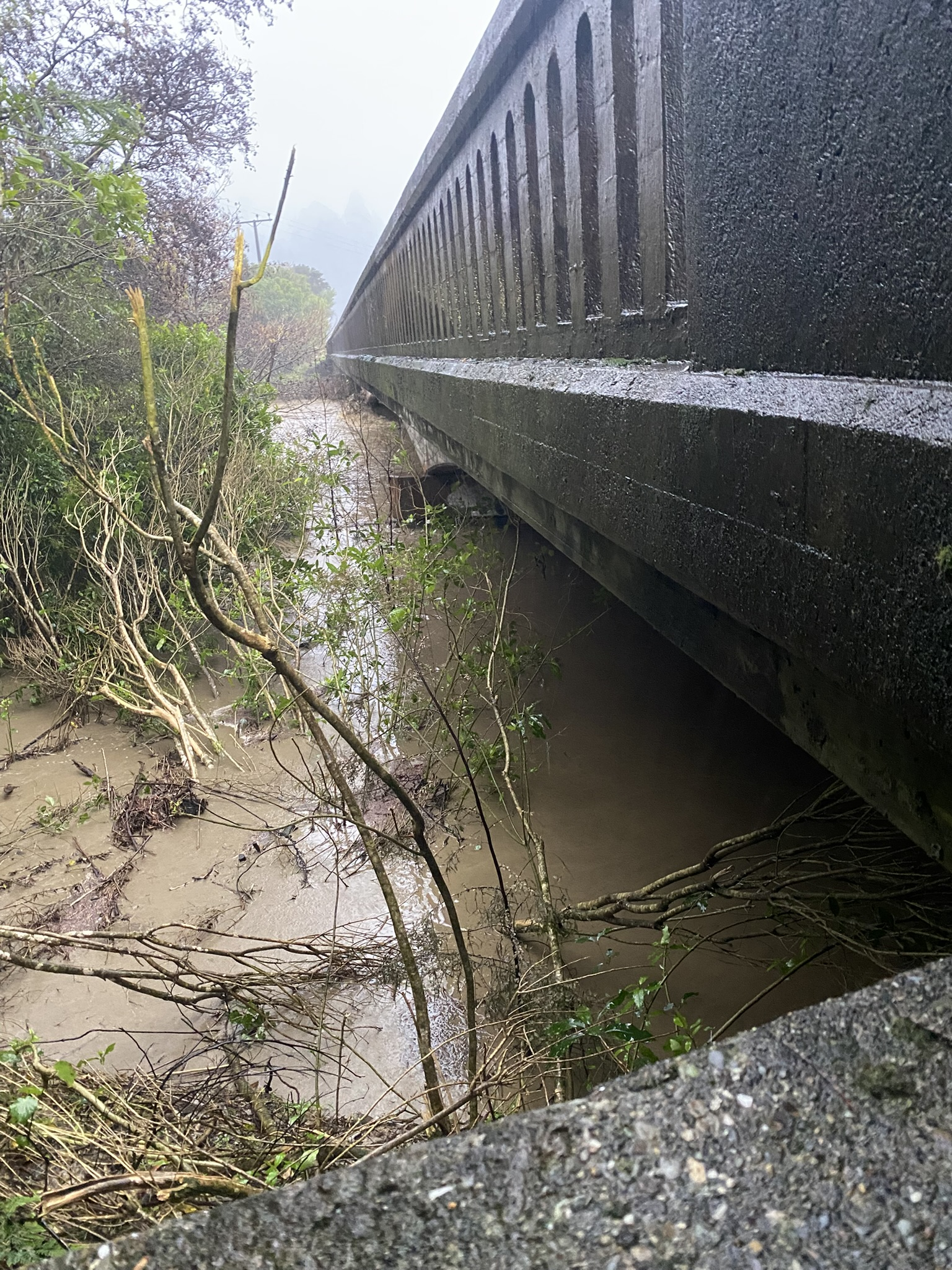
- The flooded Parapara River on 11 July 2025.
- Date: 26 June–12 July, 2025
- Location: Tasman District, Nelson, Marlborough District, Taranaki; parts of the Auckland and Otago regions.
- Deaths: One

Severe wet weather affected the Tasman, Nelson and Marlborough Districts of New Zealand's South Island in late June 2025. On 26 June, a state of emergency was declared in the Wairau-Awatere Ward of Marlborough due to heavy rain and flooding. By 27 June, another state of emergency was declared in Nelson and Tasman due to heavy rain and flooding. Areas that experienced serious flooding included Spring Creek and the Motueka Valley. The wet weather caused the death of one person in the Wai-iti River, displaced several residents in the Marlborough and Tasman Districts, and disrupted flights. On 30 June, the Minister of Agriculture Todd McClay classified the flooding in Tasman, Nelson and Marlborough as a "medium adverse event" due to flood damage to farm infrastructure, tracks, pastures and orchards in the three districts.

On 3 July, the state of emergency in Nelson, Tasman and Marlborough was extended for another seven days in response to incoming heavy rain. MetService also issued heavy rain watches and warnings for several parts of the South and North Islands. That same day, these areas experienced a second wave of heavy rainfall but avoided further flooding. On 5 July, Nelson-Tasman Civil Defence described the recent flooding in Nelson and Tasman as the worst in 150 years.

On 11 July, the Nelson-Tasman region experienced a third wave of flooding, leading to more evacuations and serious damage to local property and infrastructure. Other parts of the North and South Islands also experienced wet weather and strong winds.

== Meteorological history ==
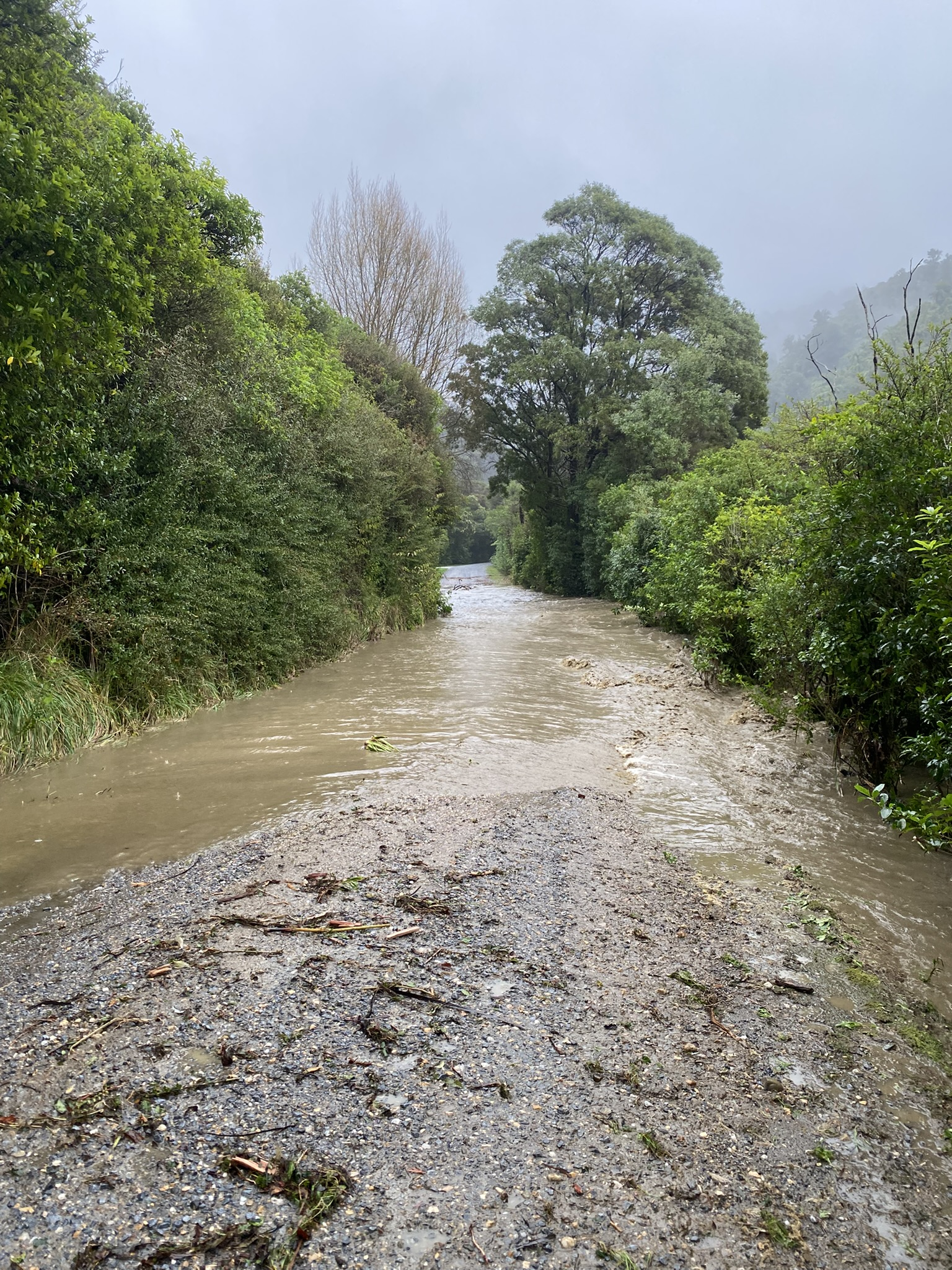
The Parapara Valley Road inundated by water from the Parapara River on 11 July.

On 25 June 2025, MetService issued several weather warnings and wind watches across New Zealand in response to a weather front bringing heavy rain and gales across the South Island. These included orange heavy rain warnings for the Tasman District north-west of Motueka, the headwaters of the Canterbury and Otago lakes and rivers, the mountain ranges of the Westland District and Fiordland north of Doubtful Sound. MetService also forecast that the Tasman District would experience 300 mm (12 in) of rain from midnight 25 June and thunderstorms. The Tasman District Council also forecast that the western part of the region would experience heavy rain between 26 and 27 June, spreading from the western part of the region towards population centres in Nelson and Richmond. The Tasman District Council's hydrology team said that moderate flood flows were expected in the Aorere River, Tākaka River, and Riuwaka River catchments. The three regions' rivers Maitai, Wairau and Waimea were expected to reach their annual flood levels. A 4.3 metre high tide was predicted for Nelson on the night of 26 June. Heavy rain watches were issued for the Taranaki Region, Marlborough District, Nelson, Tasman, southeast Motueka and the fringes of the Grey District. Strong wind watches were also issued for Marlborough, the Wellington Region, the Canterbury high country, Central Otago, and parts of the Southland Region and Fiordland. On 5 July 2025, MetService estimated that Blenheim had received a record 250 mm (9.8 in) of rain in June 2025. Nelson had received a record 220 mm (8.7 in) of rain in the same month.

By 29 June, MetService meteorologist Michael Pawley reported that weather was easing across the country as the low pressure system moved to the east of New Zealand, with some showers remaining. The improving weather allowed flood recovery efforts to commence in the Nelson-Tasman region.

On 30 June, MetService forecast further thunderstorms, wind and rain in the Tasman and Nelson regions during the first week of July. MetService's head of weather news Heather Keats said that a wet weather front bringing thunderstorms, rain and north-easterly winds was expected to reach the upper South Island on 2 July, followed by a second wave on 4 July. Keats forecast that Nelson, Blenheim, Buller and Marlborough were expected to experience heavy rain and thunderstorms. On 2 July, MetService issued an orange rain warning for the Tasman District northeast of Motueka from 3 am to 6 pm from 3 July, with 120–150 mm (4.7–5.9 in) of rain expected in most areas. MetService also forecast 80–110 mm (3.1–4.3 in) in Tasman, Nelson, and the area southeast of Motueka. In addition, MetService issued orange rain warnings for the Gisborne District and Taranaki. Yellow rain warnings were also issued for the Auckland Region, Northland Region and Waikato.

On 10 July, Nelson-Tasman Emergency Management issued a pre-emptive state of emergency in Nelson-Tasman in response to MetService's orange heavy rain warning for the region. MetService predicted that the third weather front would approach the region from 9 am, bringing heavy rainfall and strong winds by midday. This front, preceded by a strong moist northerly flow, was forecast to spread east across New Zealand between 11 and 12 July. This weather front was forecast to affect Nelson, Tasman, parts of Marlborough and southern Taranaki, which had experienced heavy rain in late June 2025. In response to Metservice's warning, MetService advised residents to move livestock to higher ground, clear waterways or debris, and avoid unnecessary road travel. Metservice also issued heavy rain warnings for the Northland, Auckland regions, the Coromandel Peninsula and Waikato region. In addition, heavy rain watches were issued for southern Waikato, Bay of Plenty, and northern Taranaki while strong wind watches were issued for Taihape, Whanganui, and Banks Peninsula.

By the evening of 11 July, MetService reported that the northern parts of the South Island were experiencing 30–40 mm (1.2–1.6 in) of rain per hour. Parts of Tasman had experienced over 200 mm (7.9 in) of rain in the past 24 hours, with some rivers exceeding the one in five year flow rates. Meanwhile, the Northland region experienced 20–30 mm (0.79–1.18 in) of rain per hour. By 7:16 pm, the heaviest rain band had moved to the east of New Zealand. 1News weather presenter Daniel Corbett warned that river levels would rise for the next few hours due to rainfall passing through water catchments. By 10:17 pm, MetService had lifted its red heavy rain warning for the Tasman District southeast of Motueka. By midnight, orange heavy rain warnings were lifted in Northland, Auckland (including Great Barrier Island), northwest Tasman, Waikato, Mount Taranaki, and the Nelson-Marlborough region. In addition, strong wind watches for Northland, Auckland, the Tasman District, northern Taranaki, Taihape, Whanganui and coastal Otago were also lifted.

By early morning 12 July, MetService had lifted all wet weather watches and warnings apart for a heavy rain watch for the Westland District's ranges. MetService forecaster Oscar Shiviti estimated that parts of the Tasman region experienced 200 mm (7.9 in) of rain on 11 July; with Paradise Peak receiving 106.1 mm (4.18 in), Perry Saddle 139.5 mm (5.49 in), Tākaka 75 mm (3.0 in) and Tākaka Hill 110 mm (4.3 in). MetService confirmed that Nelson had received 114.8 mm (4.52 in) of rain in the first 11 days of July 2025, above its July rainfall average of 74.7 mm (2.94 in). MetService reported that Nelson had experienced 219 mm (8.6 in) of rain in June 2025, above its June rainfall average of 83.1 mm (3.27 in).

== June 2025 ==
=== Nelson, Tasman and Marlborough ===
In response to MetService's heavy rain watch for Marlborough, the Marlborough District Council ordered a precautionary evacuation of the Spring Creek township on 25 June due to the cracked stopbanks straddling the Wairau River. Residents were also instructed to clear drains and gutters in their properties. On 26 June, the NZ Transport Agency Waka Kotahi warned motorists that the Auckland Harbour Bridge could be closed on 27 June due to strong winds.

In the morning of 27 June, local authorities reported flooding in Richmond, Motueka, Brightwater and parts of the Tasman District. By 4am, Fire and Emergency New Zealand (FENZ) had responded to eight-weather related call outs in Richmond and Motueka. By 6am, the Mayor of Marlborough Nadine Taylor had declared a local state of emergency to facilitate the evacuation of Spring Creek in response to concerns that the Wairau River would breach its banks. Several Spring Creek residents criticised the Marlborough District Council for delaying work on strengthening the Spring Creek stop bank following the 2016 Kaikōura earthquake and the 2021 Wairau flood. The Council had previously allocated NZ$8.7 million to the Spring Creek stop bank in May 2024, with work expected to start in November 2025. In addition to Marlborough Emergency's safety checks, the New Zealand Defence Force and New Zealand Police dispatched personnel to Spring Creek to assist with evacuations and maintaining order.

On 27 June, Marlborough Emergency Management warned residents in Renwick area to be ready to evacuate in response to an unstable river bank at the confluence of the Wairau and Waihopai Rivers. In addition, the Tasman District Council warned residents near the Motueka River between Tapawera and Riwaka to be ready to evacuate. By 9:48 am, mayor of Tasman Tim King had declared a state of emergency in the Nelson-Tasman region. By 10:02 am, FENZ reported 25 weather-related callouts throughout the Nelson-Tasman region including a person trapped in a car in Lower Moutere. Later that morning, the Marlborough District Council closed several roads due to flooding include parts of State Highway 6, State Highway 1 and State Highway 63. Civil Defence also set up an evacuation centre at the Stadium 2000 in Blenheim.

During the morning of 27 June, Minister of Emergency Management Mark Mitchell travelled to Blenheim, where he was briefed by Marlborough mayor Taylor about Marlborough Emergency Management's flood response efforts including the evacuation of Spring Creek residents. By noon, Nelson/Tasman Civil Defence group controller Andrew White said that 200 mm (7.9 in) of rain had fallen in the region in the last 12 hours. By 1:49 pm, flooding was reported at Spring Grove between Brightwater and Wakefield.

By 3:17 pm on 27 June, the NZTA's Nelson/Tasman system manager Rob Service confirmed that several state highways in the region had been closed due to flooding, including State Highway 60 over its whole length (from Collingwood to Richmond). Later that day, FENZ and Hato Hone St John responded to an injured driver whose vehicle had been trapped by flooding near the Kaituna River. By evening, some roads including the sections of State Highway 6 between Nelson and Blenheim, and State Highway 60 between Richmond and Collingwood had reopened. Civil Defence also issued evacuation orders for Tapawera, Tadmor and Riwaka due to rising water levels in the Motueka River. Renwick residents were evacuated on the night of 27 June. 20 people also became stranded when the Waiau Uwha River flooded.

On the morning of 28 June, the Tasman District Council confirmed that the district was still under a state of emergency despite declining rain and river levels. In addition, the Motueka Emergency Assistance and Information Centre assisted 16 people overnight, housed three displaced residents, and found alternative accommodation for six others. In the late afternoon, the Marlborough District Council warned Blenheim residents that the town's sewer system had been inundated by flooding and advised them to reduce toiler flushing. In addition, the Te Tau Ihu Māori iwi (tribal) grouping and Nelson City Council issued a rāhui (customary tapu) prohibiting the collection of seafood and wild game in the coastlines, rivers and flooded areas of the upper South Island as a health precaution. By the evening, serious flood damage had been reported in the Motueka Valley including a family home being swept hundreds of metres away in nearby fields.

On 28 June, the Marlborough District Council dispatched emergency personnel and a fuel truck to restore power to the Wairau Valley township, which had experienced significant flood damage including the loss of power. That same day, a male Tasman emergency worker died after being hit by a tree while clearing flood damage in the Wai-iti River.

On 29 June, Minister of Emergency Management Mark Mitchell, Deputy Mayor of Tasman Stuart Bryant, civil defence staff and Radio New Zealand journalist Samantha Gee conducted a reconnaissance flight over flood-affected areas. They identified the worst affected areas as the stretch of State Highway 6 at Kohatu, the Motueka Valley, Tapawera, Tadmor and the Wai-iti Valley. The Tasman's Great Taste Trail and numerous farms also sustained flood damage. Following the helicopter survey flight, local Civil Defence controller Alec Louverdis warned staff that another wet front was forecast for 3 and 4 July. While State Highway 6 through Kohatu remained closed, State Highway 63 in Marlborough and the Wakefield to St Arnaud route had reopened. During a press conference held on that afternoon, Mitchell said that the Government would look at installing a new rain radar in the Upper South Island since the region lacked one. Following the first wave of flooding, several Tasman residents voiced anger and frustration at the slow response of authorities and the breakdown of telecommunications infrastructure.

=== Canterbury ===
On the night of 28 June, emergency services rescued two men whose vehicle had becoming stuck in rising floodwaters near the fork of the Ōpihi and Temuka Rivers in the Canterbury Region.

=== Otago and Southland ===
On the afternoon of 27 June, MetService issued an orange heavy rain warning for Dunedin, with 90 mm (3.5 in) of rain forecast from nightfall until 6 pm on 28 June. The Dunedin City Council (DCC) confirmed that its contractors were on standby to deal with flood related events. Though significant flooding was not forecast for the area, the DCC advised residents to remain at home due to adverse weather.

On 28 June, MetService issued an updated heavy rain warning for Dunedin and the Clutha District, which was expected to last until 9 pm on 28 June. Due to heavy rainfall, the Otago Regional Council's (ORC) flood duty officer Ann Conroy confirmed that the Council was monitoring river levels in several North Otago, Dunedin, Mosgiel and Clutha locations including the Tokomairaro River and nearby Milton, Henley, the Clutha River, Middlemarch, the Water of Leith, Lindsay Creek, the Silver Stream and Taieri River. Several roads in the Clutha District were closed due to flooding. In addition, a heavy snow watch was issued for Central Otago, the Southland Region north of Lumsden, inland Dunedin and Clutha until 7 pm on 28 June. By 1:19 pm on 28 June, all state highways in the Otago and Southland regions had been reopened by NZTA.

MetService also confirmed that 40 mm (1.6 in) of rain had fallen in Dunedin and the surrounding areas over a 12-hour period on 28 June. DCC spokesperson Scott MacLean and meteorologist Devlin Lynden confirmed there were swollen gutters and surface flooding in low-lying parts of South Dunedin and Mosgiel. Lynden said that the wet weather was expected to clear on 29 June. On 28 June, South Dunedin's Surrey Street's wastewater system was inundated by flooding, resulting in sewage flowing out of a manhole between Hillside Road and South Road. Surrey Street Flood Action Group convener Lynne Newell reported that several residents were forced to defecate and urinate in buckets and bags after several toilets were incapacitated around 1 am on 28 June. In response, mayor of Dunedin Jules Radich said that the Council was working on fixing the street's wastewater systems. Several Surrey Street residents criticised the DCC for not maintaining the sewage system and not distributing sand bags.

Weather warnings for Otago, the Clutha District and Southland were lifted after 8 pm on 28 June.

=== North Island ===
On 27 June, heavy rain and strong winds damaged a building in the Auckland suburb of Avondale and disrupted 38 flights at Auckland Airport. Auckland's Rosehill College was closed early due to flooding on school grounds. That same day, MetService issued severe thunderstorm and heavy rain warnings for south Waikato, the Matamata-Piako District, the western Bay of Plenty, Taupō and Rotorua from 1:45pm to 2:15pm.

On the night of 27 June, strong winds passed through the Taranaki town of Waitara, damaging 11 properties. Meteorologist Kgolofello Dube observed that the atmospheric conditions at the time were "favourable" to the formation of a tornado.

== July 2025 ==
=== Nelson, Tasman and Marlborough ===
On 1 July, the New Zealand Army and FENZ dispatched reinforcements to the Nelson- Marlborough region in anticipation of the two heavy orange rain warnings for 3 July. Civil Defence Nelson Tasman group controller Alec Louverdis said that local authorities were planning for a worst case scenario due to the wet conditions, elevated groundwater table and the high river levels. The NZDF deployed a helicopter while recovery crews were dispatched from Christchurch to reinforce those in the Nelson and Tasman regions. FENZ also deployed two Specialist Water Rescue Teams, a Technical Urban Search and Rescue team, and an operations commander. FENZ also establishes a regional coordination centre. Two local states of emergencies remained in force in the Nelson and Tasman districts.

On 2 July, residents of Brooklyn were advised by local authorities to evacuate due to a second front of heavy rain. Six homes bordering the Motueka River were evacuated by civil defence authorities. Louverdis advised affected residents to seek shelter elsewhere. He also said that Civil Defence would monitor hotspots such as the Motupiko and Brooklands rivers, and the townships of Tapawera and Riwaka. Louverdis also warned that places that had flooded last week were at risk of further flooding due to the damp conditions. On 3 July, local authorities extended the state of emergency in Nelson, Tasman and Marlborough for another seven days in response to the incoming heavy rain. That same day, the upper South Island experienced a second wave of heavy rainfall but avoided further flooding. Quinney's Bush Camp experienced flooding due to its proximity to the Motupiko River. The nearby Korere Tophouse Valley also experienced flooding, with several farms losing land to the Motupiko River.

On 11 July, Nelson Tasman Emergency Management issued emergency alerts for several rivers including the Motupiko, Tadmor, Wai-iti and Pitfure Rivers. An emergency alert was also issued for low lying areas in the Moutere Valley. By 2:46 pm, the NZTA had closed several roads and highways in the region including parts of State Highway 6 and State Highway 60 due to slips and flooding. That same day, the Tasman District Council activated its temporary accommodation service for flood-displaced residents. By 4:00 pm, Health New Zealand had issued a warning about flood contaminated waters. In addition, the Tasman District Council advised residents of Kaiteretere and Riwaka to conserve water. At the height of the flooding, 600 km (370 mi) of roads, out of Tasman District's 1,681 km (1,045 mi), were closed.

Parapara River in flood on 11 July

By 4:15 pm on 11 July, Nelson Tasman Civil Defence had evacuated 100 homes in the region. Emergency crew also rescued people trapped by floodwaters in their cars and homes across the region including Motueka and Mārahau. In Riwaka, an evacuation hub was established at the Riwaka Memorial Hall. Several parts of the Tasman District including Motueka, Golden Bay, Tapawera and the Waimea Plains had experienced power outages, affecting 13,000 customers by 7:30 pm. By 5:29 pm, Fire and Emergency NZ confirmed that its personnel were responding to flood-related callouts across the region including Motueka, Collingwood, Richmond, Māpua and Brightwater. Overall, FENZ responded to 30 weather-related callouts throughout the region that day. By 7:19 pm, the Tapawera water treatment plant was disabled by a power outage.

By 7 am on 12 July, NZTA confirmed that contractors had managed to reopen State Highway 6 between Brightwater and Belgrove. However, State High 6 between Belgrove and Kawatiri remained closed. By 7:30 am, power had been restored to most residents across Motueka and Golden Bay. By 9:30 am, Nelson Tasman Civil Defence had dispatched a water tank to Kaiteriteri Motor Camp in response to water shortages in Kaiteretere and Riwaka. By 11:27 am, Nelson Tasman Civil Defence confirmed that welfare centres had been established in Ngatimoti, Wakefield, Taparewa and Motueka. Before noon, the Marlborough District Council reported that the Top Valley Bridge, Noels Bridge and "The Staircase" remained closed due to flooding, slips and debris.

By 1 pm on 12 July, NZTA confirmed that State Highway 63 between Waihopai Valley Road and Korere-Tophouse Road had opened to residents and essential travellers. Tasman District Council also warned the public to avoid the Wai-Iti River stopbank between Downers old crossing and Livingstone Road since inundation had rendered it unstable. During the late afternoon, Nelson Tasman Civil Defence sent a helicopter to conduct welfare checks in Tapawera, Tadmor, and Mārahau.

=== Canterbury ===
On 11 July, State Highway 75 between Christchurch and Akaroa was cut off by fallen trees. In addition, about 300 homes in Banks Peninsula and some southern Christchurch suburbs experienced power disruptions after strong winds toppled powerlines, trees and other structures. Later at 9 pm, Christchurch power supplier Orion reported that over 4,000 homes in Banks Peninsula had experienced planned power outages. FENZ responded to 13 weather-related callouts through the Canterbury Region.

By 14 July, power utility company Orion had restored power the majority of homes in Banks Peninsula except 14 homes.

=== North Island ===
On 3 July, the Taranaki region experienced 280 mm (11 in) of torrential rain and thunderstorms over a 24-hour period, leading to flooding, landslips, sewage overflows and evacuations in New Plymouth, Ōkato, Egmont Village, New Zealand State Highway 3, and Eltham.

On 11 July, wet weather caused a landslide that damaged power lines in Whangaroa Harbour in Northland, causing power outages to 472 homes and businesses. That same day, State Highway 1 through the Mangamuka Gorge was closed due to landslips. By 4:43 pm, Northland Civil Defence reported that the northern and eastern parts of the region had experienced over 50 mm (2.0 in) of rain in the past 24 hours, leading to rising river levels. That afternoon, emergency services rescued a person and two dogs from a trapped vehicle in Taipa. By 6:55 pm, Top Energy had restored power to most of the Whangaroa area.

On 11 July, Taranaki Civil Defence warned local residents to expect rising rivers, flooding, and landslides due to a fast-moving wet front sweeping across the region. On 12 July, Fire and Emergency NZ North Shift Manager Josh Pennefather confirmed that firefighters had responded to 22 weather-related callouts the previous day including two in Northland, ten in Auckland, one in Waikato and nine in Bay of Plenty. Some flooding was also reported in the Auckland suburbs of Otara and Franklin. The Auckland Response Team South Base dispatched crews to those suburbs to conduct welfare checks.

On 12 July, the Whakatāne District Council confirmed that three roads had been closed due to downed trees and flooding overnight. By 12 pm, NZTA contractors had cleared debris and reopened State Highway 1 through Mangamuka Gorge. Several homes were also evacuated in Auckland's Muriwai suburb due to a landslide.

== Responses ==
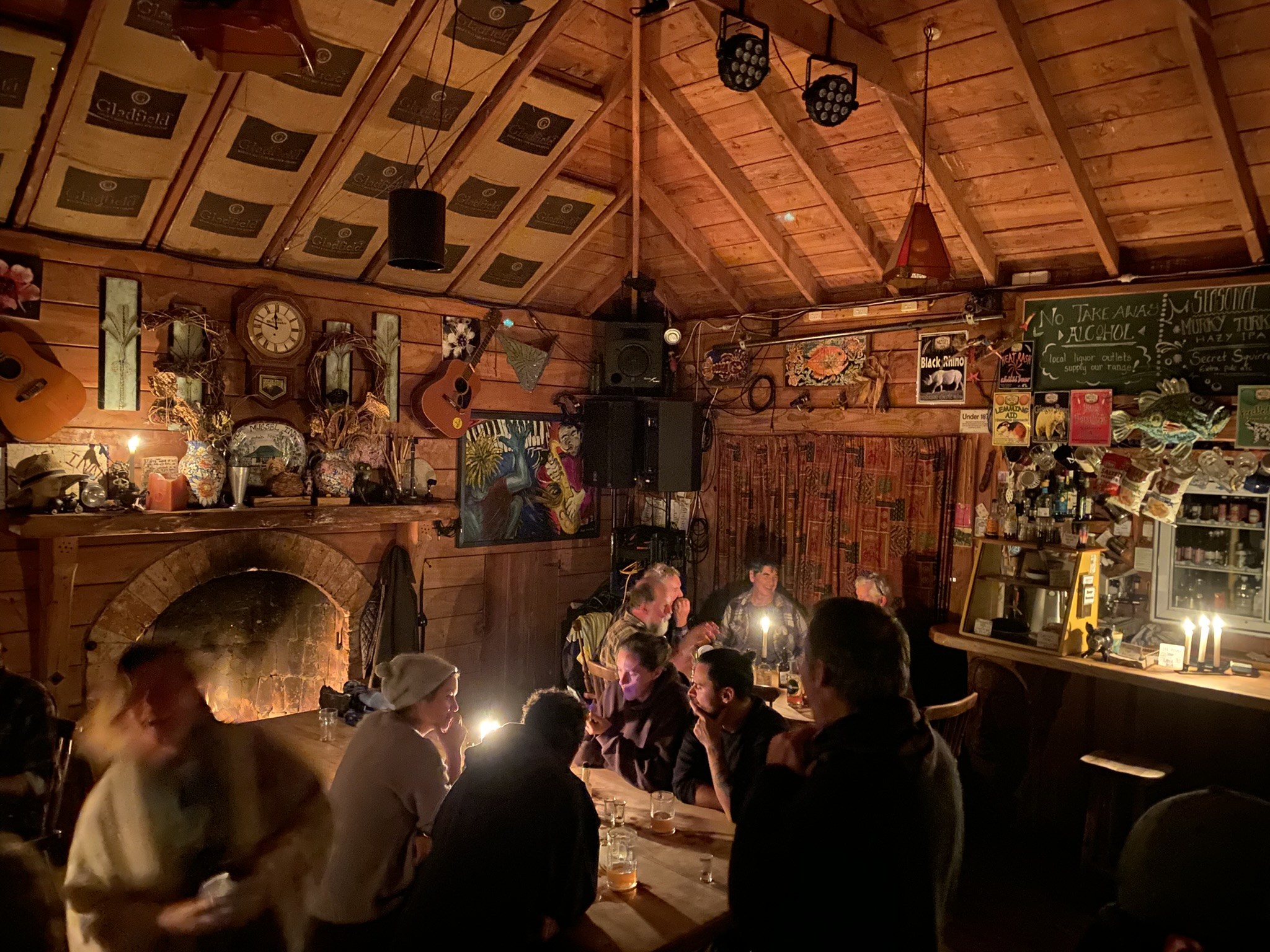
A power cut in Golden Bay due to flooding on 11 July, but the Mussel Inn operated by candlelight.

On the night of 28 June, Marlborough Emergency Management said the region was entering into recovery phase as weather conditions improved. Emergency Management transferred control back to other agencies including the Marlborough District Council, Marlborough Roads and the New Zealand Transport Agency. The District Council speculated that Marlborough could remain under a state of emergency for another five days but confirmed that recovery work would commence on 30 June. Mayor of Marlborough Nadine Taylor said that the Council's flood protection teams would begin repairing the damaged stop bank at the Waihiopai/Wairau rivers. That same day, Mayor of Marlborough Nadine Taylor confirmed that the Marlborough District Council's flood protection team would commence fixing the compromised stop bank at Waihopai/Wairau rivers confluence. She also stated that post-flood reconstruction work in Spring Creek would draw upon a NZ$8.7 million construction programme announced in May 2024, with the central government contributing NZ$3.6 million.

On 29 June, Mayor of Nelson Nick Smith announced that the Nelson-Tasman region was moving into recovery mode due to improving weather and dropping river levels. He confirmed the death of an emergency management worker during the storm and that key infrastructure had been damaged. Smith also reported that a large amount of flood and wastewater contaminants had entered the coastal area and Tasman Bay, leading to the implementation of a rāhui. Smith subsequently met with Emergency Management Minister Mark Mitchell to discuss recovery support for the region.

That same day, rapid assessment teams were dispatched to assess properties in Motueka, Riwaka and Tapawera. Nelson-Tasman group controller Alec Louverdis said "that damage to property and infrastructure in the region was substantial" and that recovery would take time." On 29 June NZTA regional manager for maintenance and operations Mark Owens confirmed that teams working to repair local roads and state highways. Affected roads included two sections of State Highway 6 between Westport and Kohatu and Rock Roads, and State Highway 63 from Renwick to Saint Arnaud. 200 people in Wairau Valley were isolated by flooding.

On 30 June, Agriculture Minister Todd McClay confirmed that the New Zealand Government had allocated NZ$100,000 to support flood relief efforts in Nelson, Tasman and Marlborough including tax relief, Rural Assistance Payments and activating Enhanced Taskforce Green. The Government also allocated NZ$20,000 to the Top of the South Rural Trust Support. Funding was also allocated to organisations working with farmers and horticulturists. In addition, McClay classified the late June floods in the upper South Island as a "medium adverse event" since the wet weather damaged livestock fences, culverts, tracks, pastures and orchards. One Motueka apple horticulturalist called for further flood protection work along the length of the Motueka River. Another Motueka resident reported dead livestock, crates and an exercise bike on her lifestyle block.

By 30 June, a mayoral relief fund had been established to support Nelson and Tasman District residents, ratepayers, business owners and not-for-profit organisations who had experienced financial hardship due to flooding in late June 2025. Marlborough Civil Defence's recovery manager Dean Heiford warned local residents to treat flood water as contaminated. Following the second wet weather event in early July 2025, 50 residents attended a meeting at the Riwaka Memorial Hall to discuss post-flood recovery.

== Impact ==
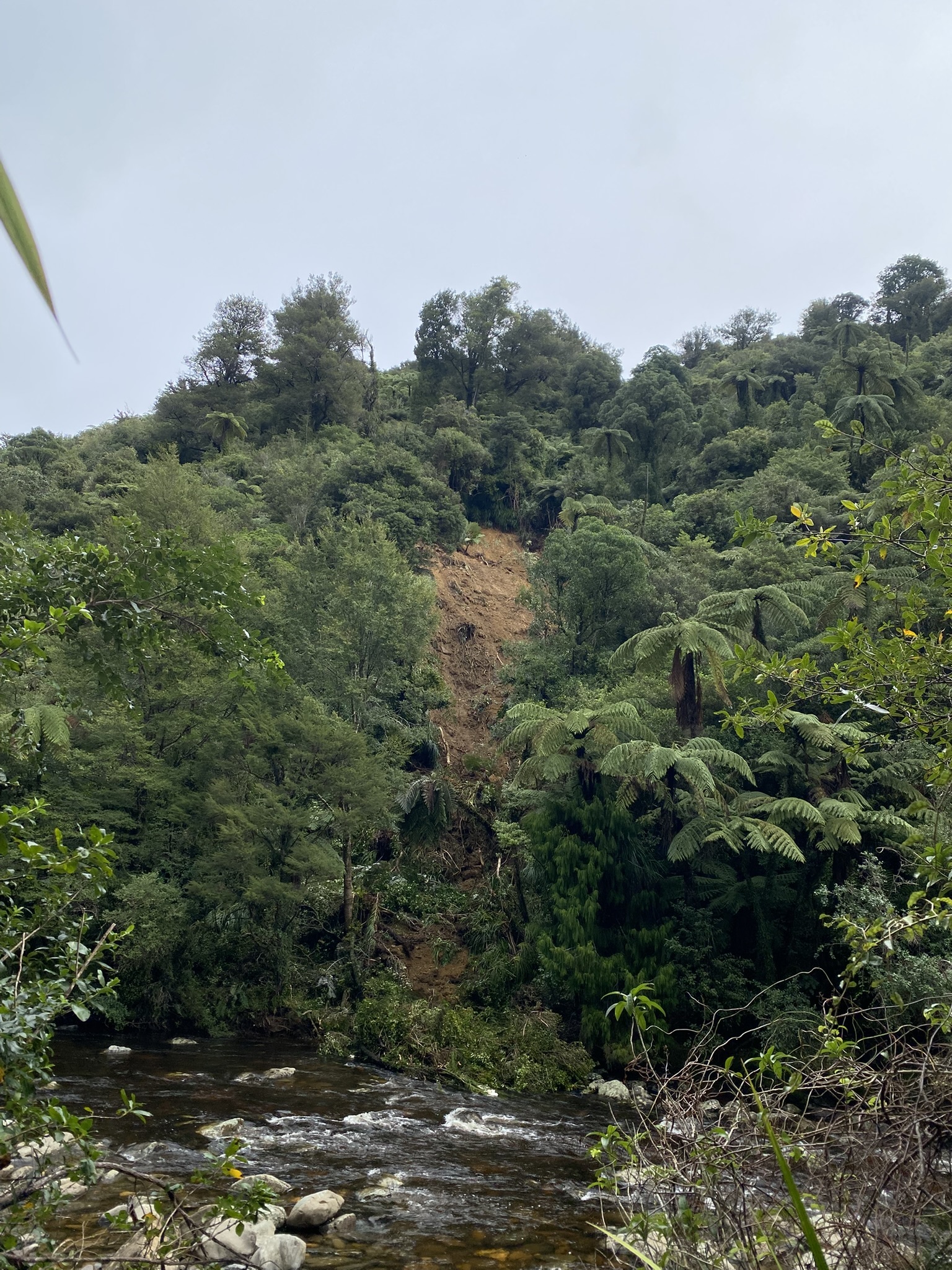
Landslip on a hillside overlooking the Parapara River.

On 29 June, Nelson Mayor Nick Smith estimated that the Nelson and Tasman districts had sustained millions of dollars' worth of damage to roads, bridges, fences, farm buildings, hop gardens, orchards, and the Great Taste Trail. He identified the worst affected areas as Wai-iti, Tapawera, Motueka Valley, Kohatu, Motupiko, Pretty Bridge Valley and Tadmor River. Smith reported that flood recovery teams were working on reopening 47 local roads while State Highway 6 south of the Kohatu Bridge had been extensively damaged by flooding from the Motueka River. Smith said that the state of emergency in the Nelson and Tasman districts would remain in force until 3 July due to forecast second wet weather front.

By 30 June, 17 homes in the Nelson-Tasman region were rendered uninhabitable due to flood damage. That same day, Mayor of Tasman Tim King described the storm damage as "worst case possible becoming a reality." He said that the flooding had caused the Wai-Iti River's riverbeds to change course, causing significant damage to nearby flat paddocks, homes, bridges, culverts and the river itself. He estimated the flood damage would have a long-term impact on local farmers, horticulturalists and forestry companies. King said that big machinery was needed to restore local rivers' original course. In addition, Federated Farmers president Kerry Irvine reported that several rural properties had experienced damage to infrastructure, fences and riverbanks. Many paddocks were also covered by silt, debris, logs and gravel.

On 30 June, telecommunications company Spark New Zealand confirmed that local fibre lines had experienced flood damage, resulting in the loss of four Spark cellular sites and disrupted landline service for 70 landline customers. That same day, insurance company IAG New Zealand's general manager of claims Stephanie Ferris confirmed that the company's brands AMI Insurance, State Insurance and NZI had received a total of 373 weather-related home, contents, vehicle and commercial insurance claims as a result of the flood damage. Some of these claims were reported as far north as Auckland.

On 5 July, Nelson-Tasman Civil Defence controller Rob Smith described the 2025 winter floods as the worst to affect the region since 1877. By 5 July, Nelson-Tasman Civil Defence had assessed nearly 650 properties in Nelson and Tasman for flood damage. Of these properties, one was red-stickered, 13 were yellow stickered and 90 households were advised to seek further support. 17 homes in the Nelson and Tasman region were rendered uninhabitable, with the Motueka Valley being described by Radio New Zealand as the "hardest hit area." While the Government had allocated NZ$6.6 million to refurbishing the Lower Motueka River stopbank in August 2024, work had not been completed by the time of the flooding in late June-early July 2025. Some residents sought help from the Rural Support Trust. Response Controller Rob Smith confirmed that 42 staff had been deployed on 5 July to assess properties in Brooklyn and Wakefield.

On 12 July, a press conference was held at Nelson Airport, featuring Nelson Tasman civil controller Louverdis, Mayor of Tasman Tim King and Emergency Management Minister Mitchell. Louverdis confirmed that power had been restored to Motueka and Tākaka, but that 3,200 people remained without power. During the press conference, King described the flood damage in the Tasman District as worse than the earlier floods and said that a rebuild was necessary. Mitchell estimated that the flood damage was in the millions and that senior officials were assessing damage to local communities. Tasman District Council principal hydrologist Martin Doyle described the flooding in the district as "the worst he had seen in his 45 years of being a hydrologist." He identified Tākaka and Motueka as some of the worst affected areas, and said that several farms in the Upper Motueka had lost land due to the river change course.

On 14 July, Radio New Zealand reported that flash flooding over the past two weeks had caused extensive damage to Motueka Valley. Large chunks of land had been gouged out by landslides. In addition, a landslip in Muriwai disrupted travel through the town. Muriwai had previously experienced flood damage during the 2023 Auckland Anniversary Weekend floods and Cyclone Gabrielle.
