= Great Taste Trail =

Cycle trail in New Zealand

Coordinates: 41°20′S 173°11′E

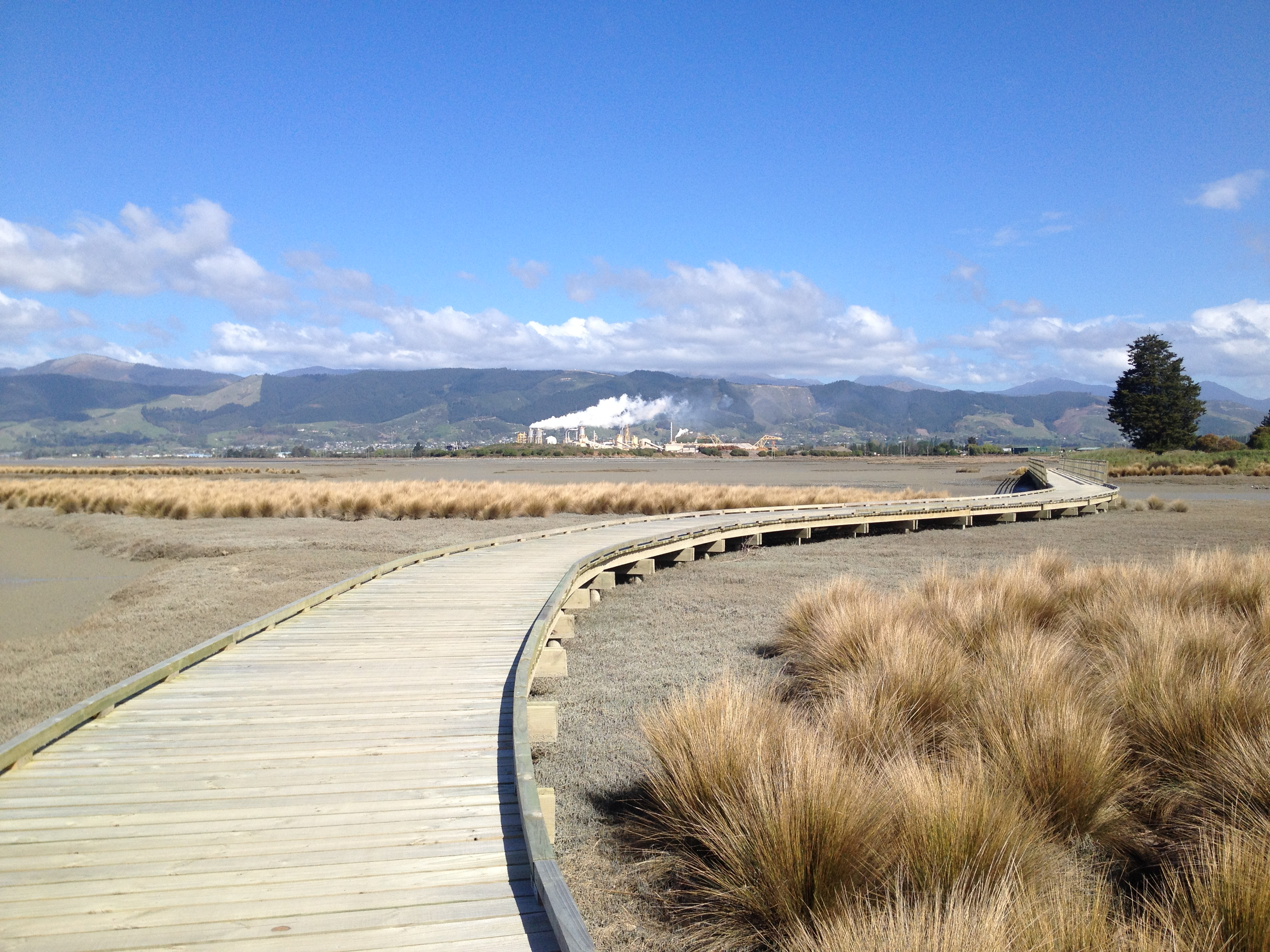
- The Great Taste Trail in Richmond
- Length: 200 km (120 mi)
- Location: Tasman District, New Zealand
- Use: Cycling; Walking
- Season: Year round
- Sights: Coastal scenery, rural scenery and rivers
- Website: heartofbiking.org.nz/tasmans-great-taste-trail/

Trail map
- Interactive map of the Great Taste trail

The Great Taste Trail is a cycle trail in the Tasman District of the South Island of New Zealand. This trail is one of the Great Rides of the New Zealand Cycle Trail project. The trail is around 200 km (120 mi) long.

== Route ==
The majority of the route is a loop from the coast at Richmond, travelling inland through Wakefield and Kohatu to Tapawera, and then back to the coast at Riwaka, returning along the coast, via Motueka, Lower Moutere, Tasman view lookout, Māpua and Rabbit Island, and then back to Richmond. The loop can be cycled in either direction. There is an extension from Riwaka to Kaiteriteri and a spur from Nelson connecting to the loop. The trail commences from three starting places in Nelson: on the Maitai River path in central Nelson, on Beach Road in Tāhunanui, and at Nelson Airport.

The route uses parts of a historic Nelson railway corridor. The Nelson section was an isolated government-owned railway line between Nelson and Glenhope in the Tasman District. While part of the New Zealand Government Railways, the section was never connected to the national railway network, although there were plans to do so. The line operated for 79 years between 1876 and 1955. Sections of the Great Taste Trail that use the old rail corridor are: the Railway Reserve on the route out of Nelson city, an alternative route through Stoke, the route between Richmond and Hope, Tunnel Road and Spooners Tunnel through to Tapawera.

== History ==
The initial idea for a cycle trail in the Nelson-Tasman area was conceived by a small group of cyclists in 2007. The original concept was for a cycle path from Picton, and through Nelson to Murchison. By 2009, central government was interested in the idea of a national cycle trail, and this was promoted by the then Prime Minister John Key. The national project ultimately became the New Zealand Cycle Trail – a network of 'Great Rides' that were dedicated cycleways, mostly off-road and in particularly scenic locations. In response to the government initiative, the Nelson Tasman Cycle Trails Trust was registered in July 2009 to promote the development of a tourist cycle route in the Nelson-Tasman region.

By October 2011, the route of the cycle trail had been constructed across Rabbit Island, and the Māpua cycleway ferry had been launched to provided a means for cyclists to cross the Māpua channel. A route had also been completed from Nelson city to Richmond and Hope. The first section of the trail, from Nelson city to Māpua, was officially opened by Prime Minister John Key on 4 July 2013. The Nelson Tasman Cycle Trails Trust reported that 200,000 riders had used the trail in 2016. A report commissioned by the Nelson Tasman Cycle Trails Trust estimated that the total spend by visitors to the Nelson Tasman region who travelled specifically to bike the trail was more than $34 million for the year ending June 2023.

During the severe flooding in June-July 2025, around 30 km (19 mi) of the trail was damaged. Some sections of the trail fell into the Wai-iti and Waimea rivers. The trail was closed, with estimates of the cost of repairs exceeding $2M. Some sections of the trail were re-opened in mid-July. In September, Government funding of $1.6M was provided for rebuilding of damaged sections to allow the majority of the trail to be repaired by December, restoring the full loop.

== Features ==
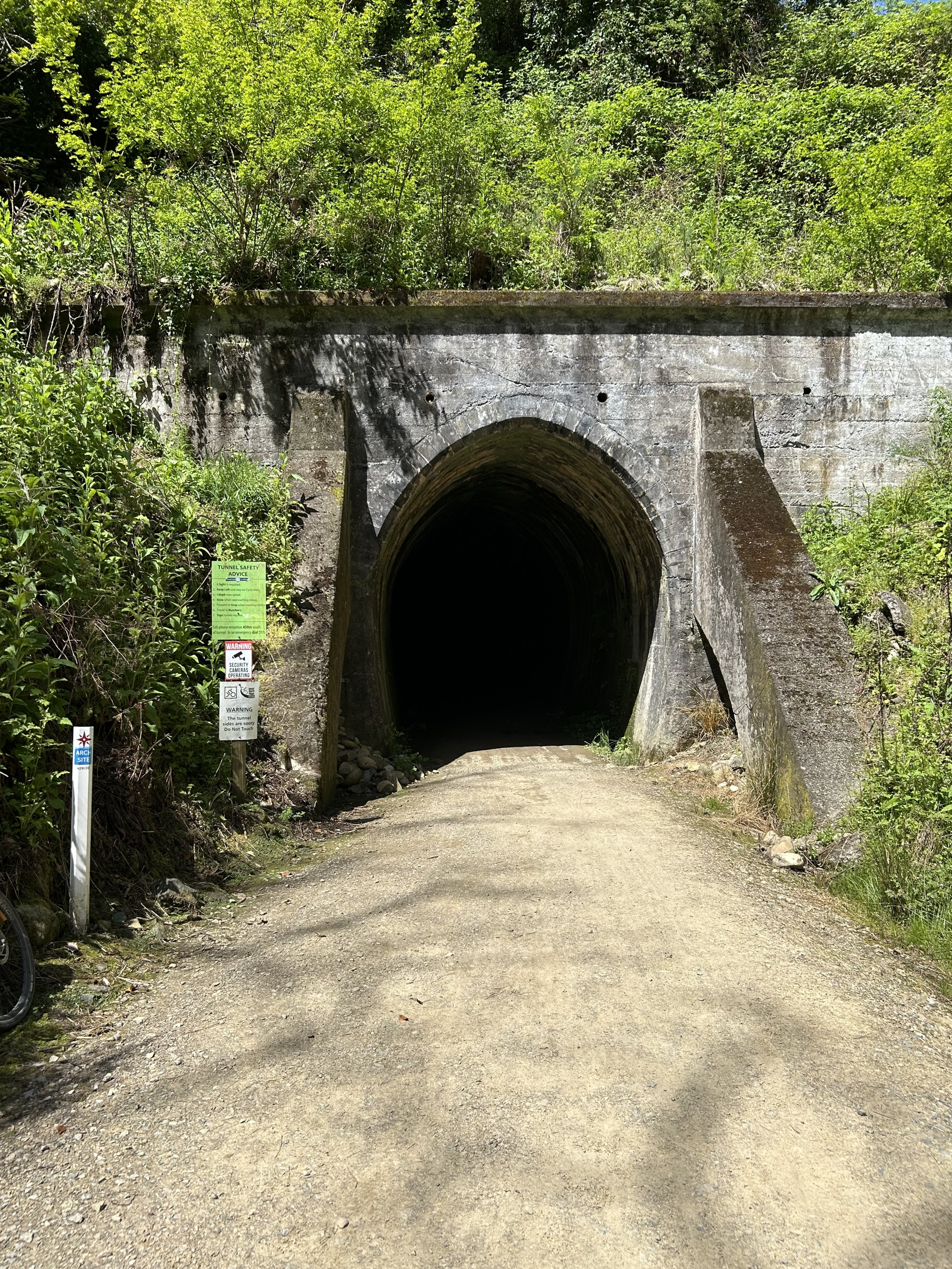
Spooners Tunnel – western portal

=== Spooners Tunnel ===
Spooners Tunnel was constructed as part of the Nelson section railway, and was opened in 1893. The 1,352-metre-long (0.840 mi) tunnel passes through the Spooners Range between Belgrove and Tapawera. (Note: Sources vary in describing the length of Spooners Tunnel. The length is stated as 1,352 m on signage at the tunnel entrance. However, the length is described as 67 chains in accounts from 1892 and 1897, and this converts to 1,347 metres.) Following the decommissioning of the Nelson railway in 1955, railway enthusiasts had kept the tunnel open for guided tours, but it was closed in 2002 for safety reasons and because of the loss of road access. On 17 April 2016 the Spooners tunnel was permanently opened to the public as part of the Great Taste Trail. It is claimed to be the longest cycle tunnel in the Southern Hemisphere.

=== Lord Rutherford Memorial ===
The route of the Great Taste Trail through Brightwater passes by a memorial to Ernest Rutherford, the physicist and British peer who was a pioneering researcher in both atomic and nuclear physics. Rutherford was born at Spring Grove near to the Brightwater. The memorial is a statue of Rutherford as a boy, and includes a mound surrounded by terraces with plants and trees from places where he worked: Canada, England and New Zealand.

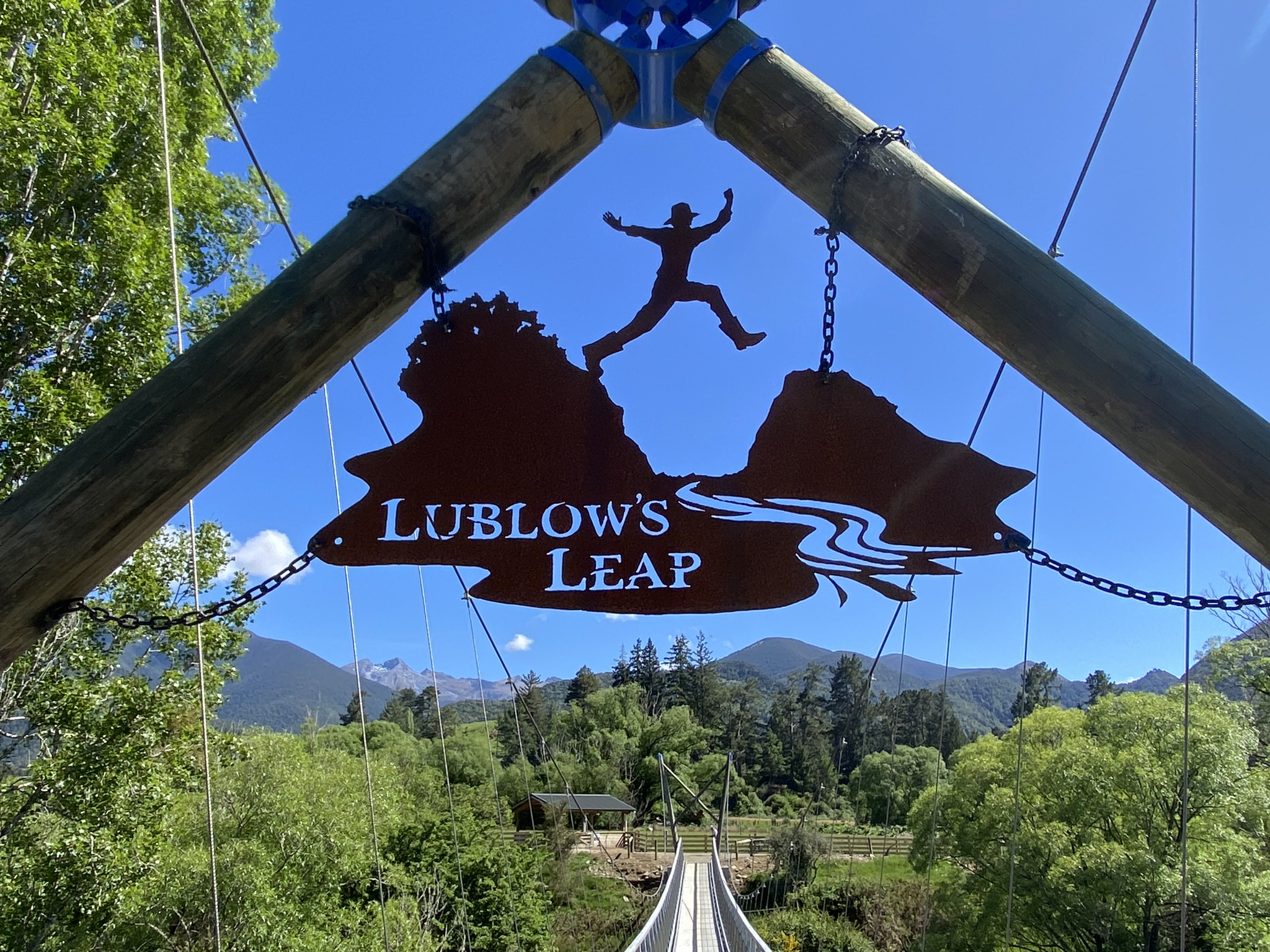
Cycle and pedestrian bridge over Baton River

=== Lublow's Leap ===
Lublow's Leap is a rest stop and honesty shop on a remote section of the trail between Tapawera and Ngātīmoti. It is located on Baton Valley Rd, adjacent to the suspension bridge across the Baton River. The facility was built by Fiona and Richard Lublow on a section of land that they gifted to the trail.

=== Māpua ferry ===
The Māpua ferry forms part of the Great Taste Trail, and provides a connection from the wharf at Māpua across the narrow channel to Rabbit Island. The cycleway ferry service was officially opened in October 2011. The vessel, known as the Flat Bottom Fairy, has 15 bike racks and can carry 50 passengers. In 2014, the Nelson Cycle Trail Trust reported that 16,000 cyclists had used the Māpua ferry.

=== Waimea Inlet ===
The Great Taste Trail crosses over the Waimea Inlet, a shallow tidal lagoon that is the second-largest estuary in the South Island, with an area of 3,462 ha (8,550 acres). A large barrier sand island, Moturoa / Rabbit Island, separates the estuary from Tasman Bay.
