= Thomas Champion =

Thomas Champion may refer to:

- Thomas Champion (cyclist) (born 1999), French cyclist who rides for UCI World Team
- Thomas Champion (musician), guitarist and songwriter, member of the Australian band The Preatures (formed 2010)
- Thomas Champion (priest) (active 20th century), New Zealand priest
