= Māpua, New Zealand =

Settlement in Tasman District, New Zealand

Māpua
- Village
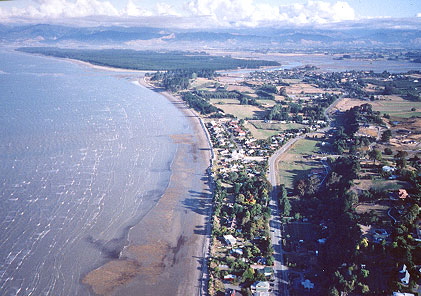
- Photo taken from a hang glider above Ruby Bay cliffs
- Interactive map of Māpua
- Coordinates: 41°15′15″S 173°05′45″E
- Country: New Zealand
- Territorial authority: Tasman
- Ward: Moutere-Waimea Ward
- Electorates: West Coast-Tasman; Te Tai Tonga (Māori)

Government
  - Territorial Authority: Tasman District Council
  - Mayor of Tasman: Tim King
  - West Coast-Tasman MP: Maureen Pugh
  - Te Tai Tonga MP: Tākuta Ferris

Area
  - Total: 2.71 km^{2} (1.05 sq mi)

Population (June 2025)
  - Total: 1,680
  - Density: 620/km^{2} (1,610/sq mi)
- Time zone: UTC+12 (NZST)
  - Summer (DST): UTC+13 (NZDT)
- Area code: 03

Māpua is a small town in the South Island of New Zealand. It is to the west of Nelson on State Highway 60 and on the coastline of Tasman Bay.

With a thriving wharf and commercial area, Māpua has grown in popularity for visitors, with numbers swelling the region over the summer months. A large fair and market is held every Easter Sunday. Up to 10,000 people visit the town on this day to enjoy rides, stalls, and other attractions. The local schools and playcentre benefit from the fair, which is their primary fundraising activity.

== History ==
=== Before 1930 ===
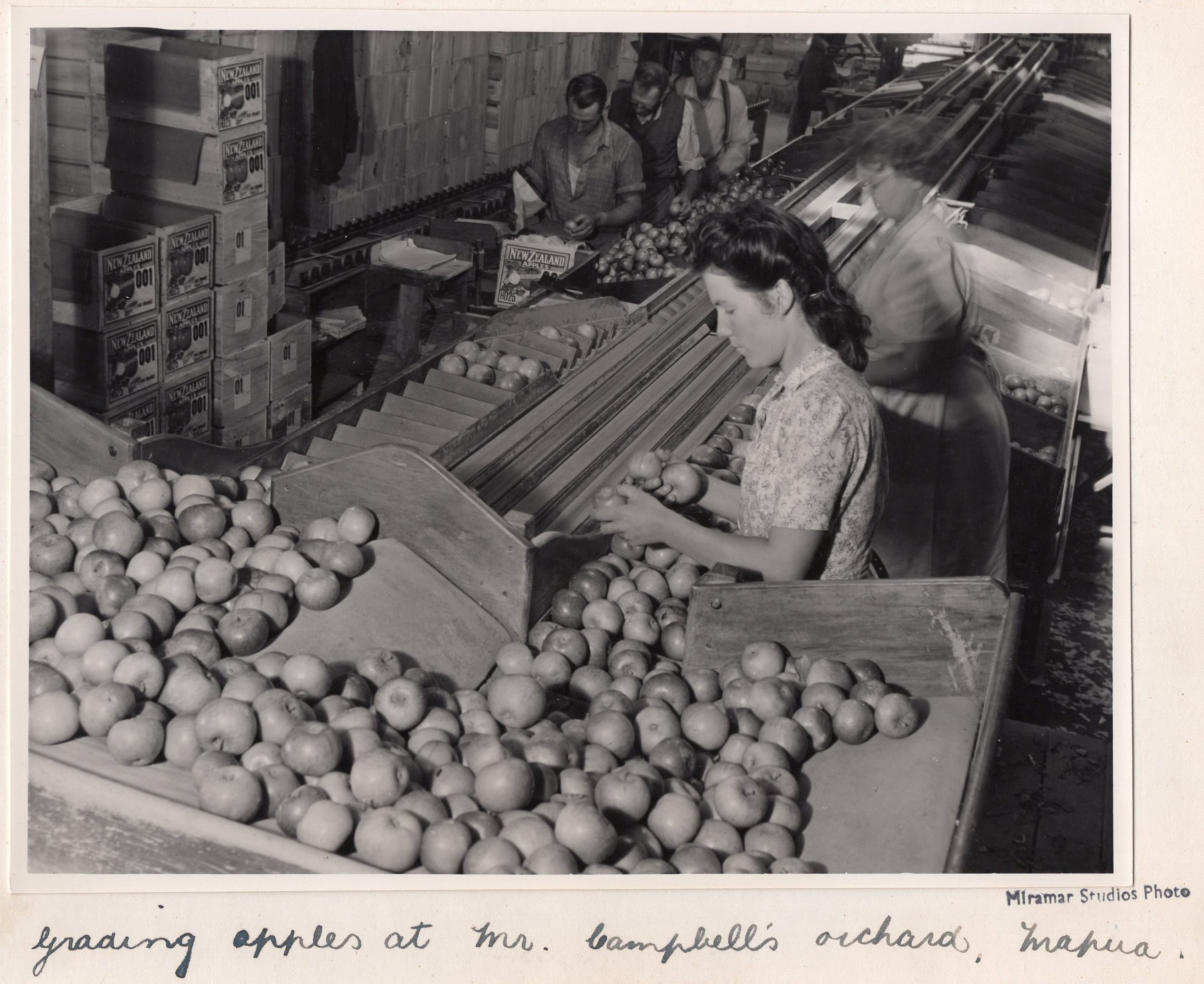
Campbell's Orchard, Mapua

Middens, tools and human bones found at Grossis Point and around the northern edges of the Waimea inlet suggest small seasonal Māori settlements were located here, with a major pā (fortified settlement) located on the Kina Cliffs to the north. The pā remained in use in the period of early European settlement of the Māpua district; the public can visit the site. The lack of evidence of cannibalism and the rarity of weapons suggest that the Māori living in this district were peaceful and seldom were involved in wars. In the late 1820s, Māori from the North Island (led by the Māori Chief Te Rauparaha) came to the South Island with warriors armed with muskets. Te Rauparaha took over Marlborough before sending half his army west to take over Tasman Bay / Te Tai-o-Aorere and Golden Bay. Owing to the invaders' considerable advantage in weaponry and skill, they soon overcame the local Māori populations. After a battle, most of the invaders moved on, leaving only a small local population of Māori in the region.

The first land-sale to a European in Māpua involved 166 acres, bought in 1854 by Captain James S. Cross for 60 pounds.

The first European resident of Māpua, James Heatly, worked as a fisherman and hunted rabbits, which he brought to Nelson to sell. The port area was originally known as the Western Entrance, and the township dubbed Seaton Township (by a surveyor who had been subdividing part of the town). Mr F.I. Ledger helped plan out the town and later named it "Mapua" which was also what the New Zealand telephone guide named it. Māpua means "abundance" or "prolific" when interpreted into English. By 1915, a substantial wharf could cope with larger ships coming into the harbour for the apple trade, which was booming at this time. The poor roads in the area meant that shipping the apples out was the only option, however eventually a road was built around the Ruby Bay bluffs, linking Nelson with Motueka. A shop, first opened in 1921 to service the locals, stood on the same plot of land as the present-day shop.

The name of the town was officially gazetted as Māpua on 5 November 2018.

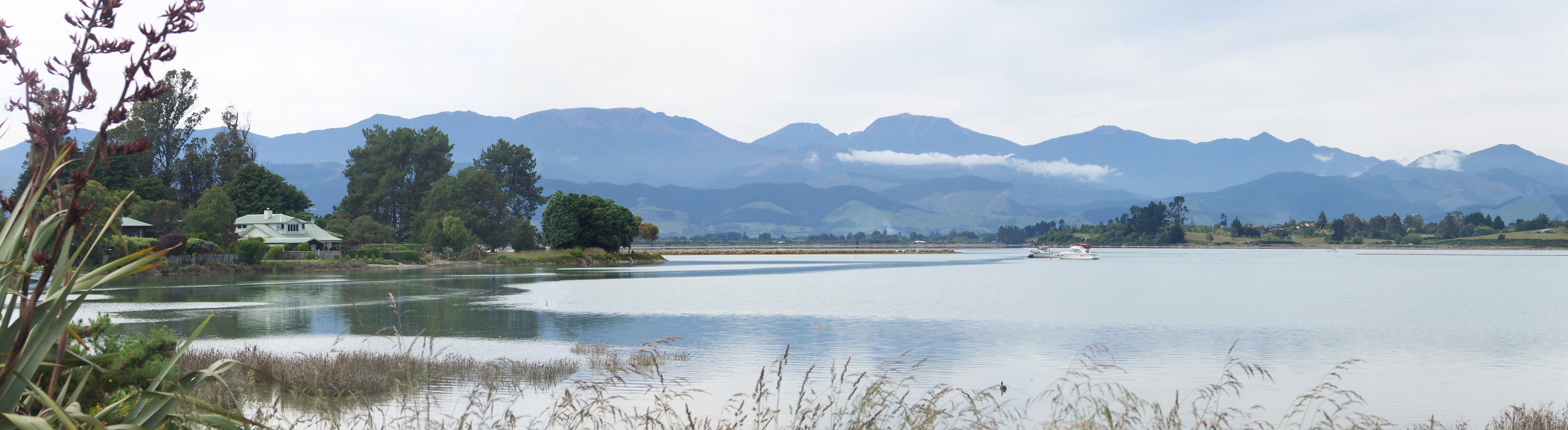
The shoreline at Māpua

=== Former contaminated site ===
In the 20th century Māpua became one of the most contaminated sites in New Zealand due to pesticide residues in the soils from a now defunct factory, but the 21st century saw a major cleanup operation.

In 1932 the Fruitgrowers Chemical Company built a plant to manufacture pesticides for use in the numerous orchards in the surrounding area. In the 1940s the factory produced organomercury and organochlorine pesticides, including DDT, DDD, dieldrin, 2,4-D and paraquat. Organophosphorous pesticides were produced from the 1960s. By 1978, 124 chemicals were being used to produce 84 different formulations. The plant closed in 1988.

The Tasman District Council took over the site in 1989, and measures were taken to prevent leaching of the chemicals into the adjoining Waimea Inlet. In 1999, the Ministry for the Environment allocated funding for a remediation programme, with "on-site" processing selected as the preferred remediation option. Two years later, the Tasman District Council awarded a contract for remedial work to a partnership of Theiss Services (an Australian remediation specialist) and Environmental Decontamination Limited (EDL) of Auckland. Thiess, the main contractor, held the resource consents to carry out the work; EDL supplied the remediation technology: Mechano-Chemical Dehalogenation (MCD). The site was handed back to the Tasman District Council in November 2007.

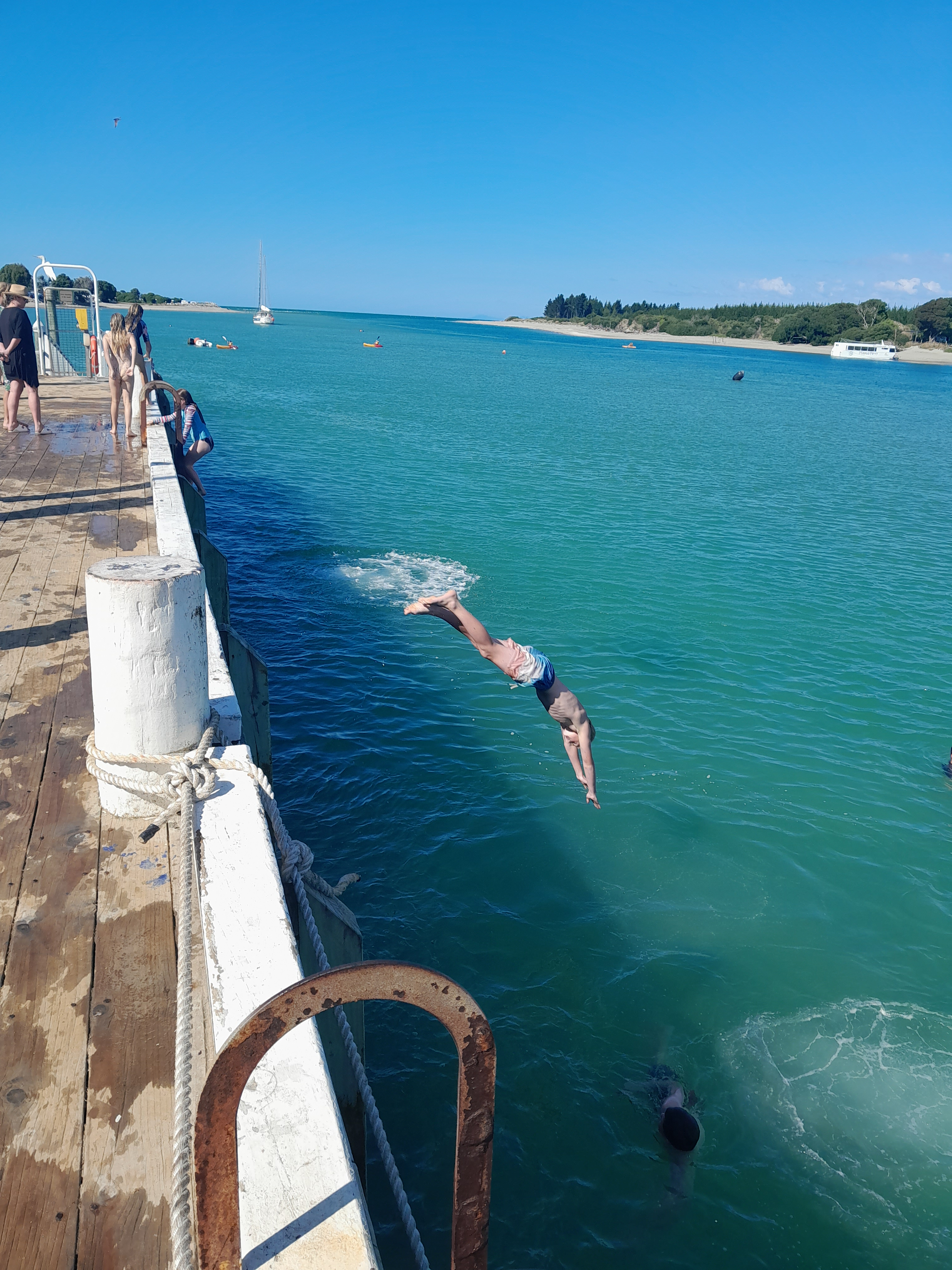
Mapua wharf is a popular spot for jumping into the water on hot days. Rabbit Island is in the distance on the right hand side (2023)

In May 2012, a Department of Labour report found that some of the 30 people who worked on the cleanup suffered health issues including respiratory problems, nausea, collapsing and fatigue.

== Demographics ==
=== Māpua ===
Mapua is described by Statistics New Zealand as a small urban area. It covers 2.71 km^{2} (1.05 sq mi) and had an estimated population of 1,680 as of June 2025, with a population density of 620 people per km^{2}.

Historical population
Year	Pop.	±% p.a.
2006	960	—
2013	1,170	+2.87%
2018	1,482	+4.84%
2023	1,620	+1.80%
The 2006 population is for a smaller area of 2.32 km^{2}. Source:

Māpua had a population of 1,620 in the 2023 New Zealand census, an increase of 138 people (9.3%) since the 2018 census, and an increase of 450 people (38.5%) since the 2013 census. There were 819 males, 801 females, and 3 people of other genders in 654 dwellings. 2.0% of people identified as LGBTIQ+. The median age was 51.7 years (compared with 38.1 years nationally). There were 267 people (16.5%) aged under 15 years, 162 (10.0%) aged 15 to 29, 714 (44.1%) aged 30 to 64, and 480 (29.6%) aged 65 or older.

People could identify as more than one ethnicity. The results were 95.4% European (Pākehā); 6.1% Māori; 0.4% Pasifika; 1.9% Asian; 0.7% Middle Eastern, Latin American and African New Zealanders (MELAA); and 3.5% other, which includes people giving their ethnicity as "New Zealander". English was spoken by 98.7%, Māori by 1.1%, and other languages by 10.2%. No language could be spoken by 1.1% (e.g. too young to talk). New Zealand Sign Language was known by 0.2%. The percentage of people born overseas was 29.3, compared with 28.8% nationally.

Religious affiliations were 24.4% Christian, 0.4% Hindu, 0.6% Buddhist, 0.7% New Age, and 0.6% other religions. People who answered that they had no religion were 64.4%, and 9.1% of people did not answer the census question.

Of those at least 15 years old, 456 (33.7%) people had a bachelor's or higher degree, 681 (50.3%) had a post-high school certificate or diploma, and 216 (16.0%) people exclusively held high school qualifications. The median income was $38,300, compared with $41,500 nationally. 189 people (14.0%) earned over $100,000 compared to 12.1% nationally. The employment status of those at least 15 was 555 (41.0%) full-time, 243 (18.0%) part-time, and 18 (1.3%) unemployed.

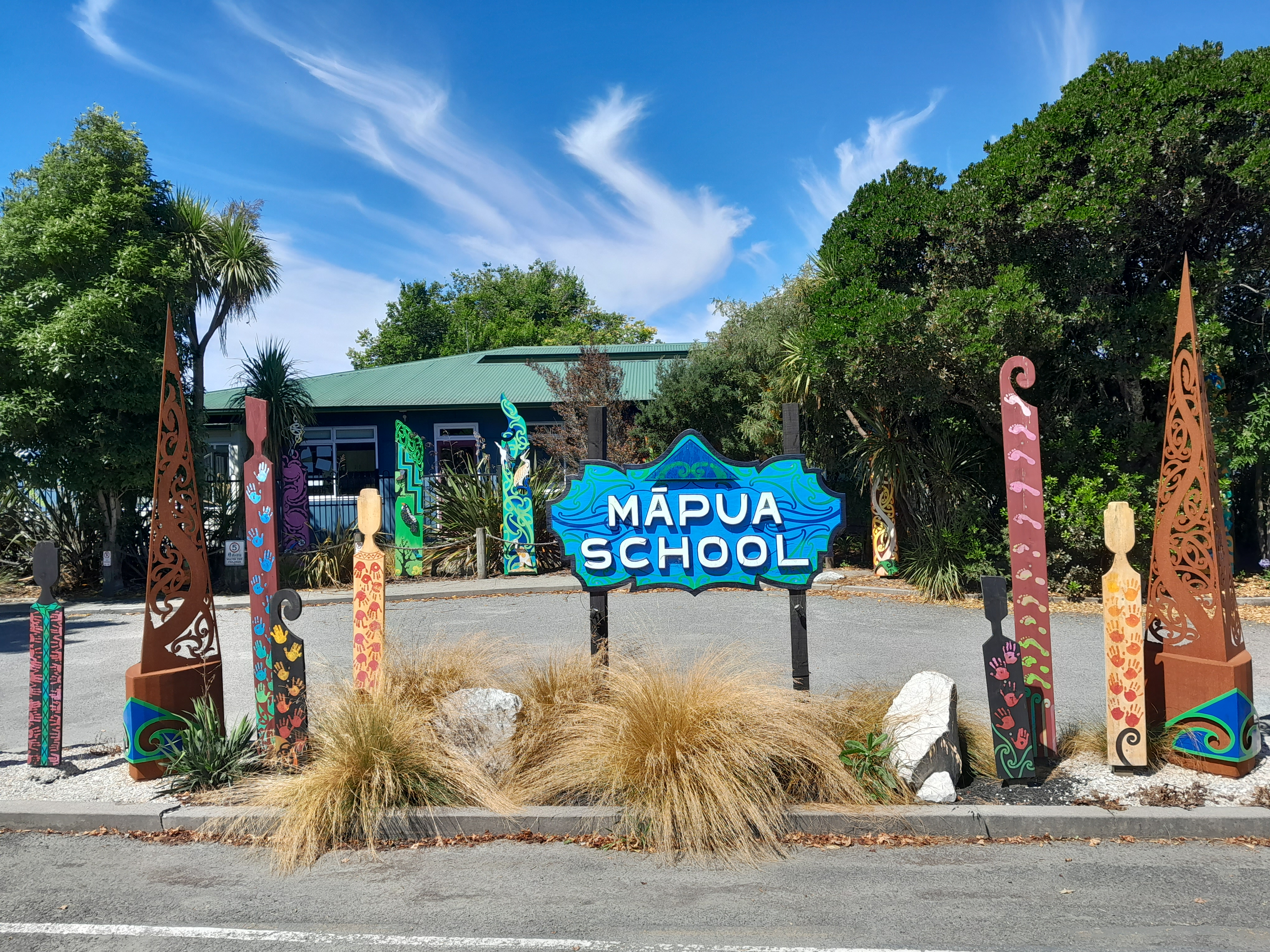
Māpua school (2023)

== Education ==
Māpua School is a co-educational state primary school for Year 1 to 8 students, with a roll of 238 as of July 2026. It opened in 1915.

== Māpua ferry ==
Māpua is one of the stops on the Tasman's Great Taste Trail which is a mountain bike trail which links the towns of Nelson, Wakefield, Richmond, Motueka and Kaiteriteri. The Māpua ferry forms part of the Great Taste Trail, and provides a connection from the wharf at Māpua across the narrow channel to Rabbit Island. In 2014, the Nelson Cycle Trail Trust reported that 16,000 cyclists had used the Māpua ferry.
