= Tākaka Hill =

Hill in New Zealand

Coordinates: 41°02′S 172°51′E

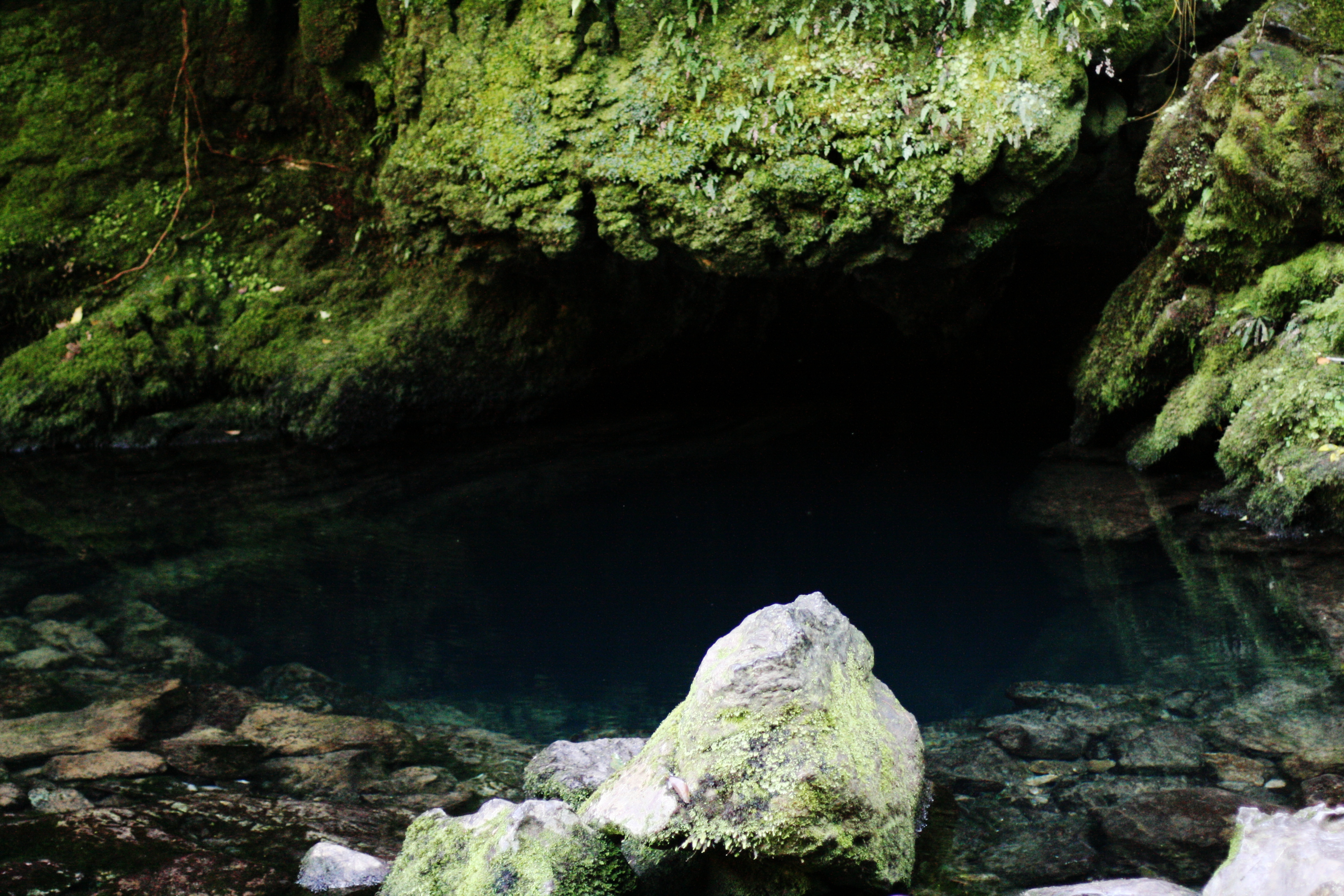
The mouth of The Resurgence, the spring that drains much of the hill through limestone caves and sinkholes

Tākaka Hill, also referred to as Marble Mountain, is a range of hills in the north-west of the South Island of New Zealand. Made of marble that has weathered into many strange forms and with numerous sinkholes, it is typical karst country. The marble is Ordovician in age and from the Tākaka terrane. Its highest point is 950 metres above sea level.

There is only one road winding over and around the flanks of Tākaka Hill, State Highway 60, following the valleys of the Tākaka River to the northwest and the Riuwaka River to the southeast. In July 2020, the name of the pass was officially gazetted as Tākaka Hill Saddle by the New Zealand Geographic Board.

The road rises to 791 metres at its highest point and separates the coastal communities of Golden Bay from those of the more populous Tasman Bay to the southeast and because of its winding nature isolates Golden Bay from the rest of the South Island.

Tākaka Hill is notable for its (now defunct) marble quarry and for many limestone caves and sinkholes, including Ngārua Caves, which are open to the public and feature deposits of moa bones. Harwoods Hole, at one time the deepest cave in New Zealand, is on Tākaka Hill. Many of the caves drain into The Resurgence, a spring at the foot of the hill. Labyrinth Rock Park, near Tākaka township, is an accessible natural rock maze of sculptured rocks, corrugated walls and vertical clefts.

Tākaka Hill, as many other areas in and around the Golden Bay, has been the location for many scenes filmed for The Lord of the Rings film trilogy.

Takaka Hill is the site of New Zealand's first public-access via ferrata, opened on December 2024.

== Demographics ==
Tākaka Hills statistical area, which includes Brooklyn and Rākauroa / Torrent Bay, covers 277.72 km^{2} (107.23 sq mi) and had an estimated population of 1,350 as of June 2025, with a population density of 4.9 people per km^{2}.

Historical population
Year	Pop.	±% p.a.
2006	1,143	—
2013	1,098	−0.57%
2018	1,185	+1.54%
2023	1,302	+1.90%

Takaka Hills had a population of 1,302 in the 2023 New Zealand census, an increase of 117 people (9.9%) since the 2018 census, and an increase of 204 people (18.6%) since the 2013 census. There were 660 males and 642 females in 495 dwellings. 2.1% of people identified as LGBTIQ+. The median age was 46.2 years (compared with 38.1 years nationally). There were 213 people (16.4%) aged under 15 years, 171 (13.1%) aged 15 to 29, 666 (51.2%) aged 30 to 64, and 252 (19.4%) aged 65 or older.

People could identify as more than one ethnicity. The results were 90.3% European (Pākehā); 11.1% Māori; 1.8% Pasifika; 2.3% Asian; 0.7% Middle Eastern, Latin American and African New Zealanders (MELAA); and 4.6% other, which includes people giving their ethnicity as "New Zealander". English was spoken by 98.2%, Māori by 3.2%, Samoan by 0.2%, and other languages by 10.8%. No language could be spoken by 1.4% (e.g. too young to talk). New Zealand Sign Language was known by 0.7%. The percentage of people born overseas was 22.6, compared with 28.8% nationally.

Religious affiliations were 16.8% Christian, 0.2% Māori religious beliefs, 1.2% Buddhist, 0.9% New Age, 0.2% Jewish, and 1.2% other religions. People who answered that they had no religion were 73.5%, and 6.2% of people did not answer the census question.

Of those at least 15 years old, 228 (20.9%) people had a bachelor's or higher degree, 576 (52.9%) had a post-high school certificate or diploma, and 276 (25.3%) people exclusively held high school qualifications. The median income was $33,500, compared with $41,500 nationally. 75 people (6.9%) earned over $100,000 compared to 12.1% nationally. The employment status of those at least 15 was 498 (45.7%) full-time, 207 (19.0%) part-time, and 21 (1.9%) unemployed.

== See also ==
- List of caves in New Zealand
