= Ruby Bay =

Settlement in Tasman District, New Zealand

- Rural settlement
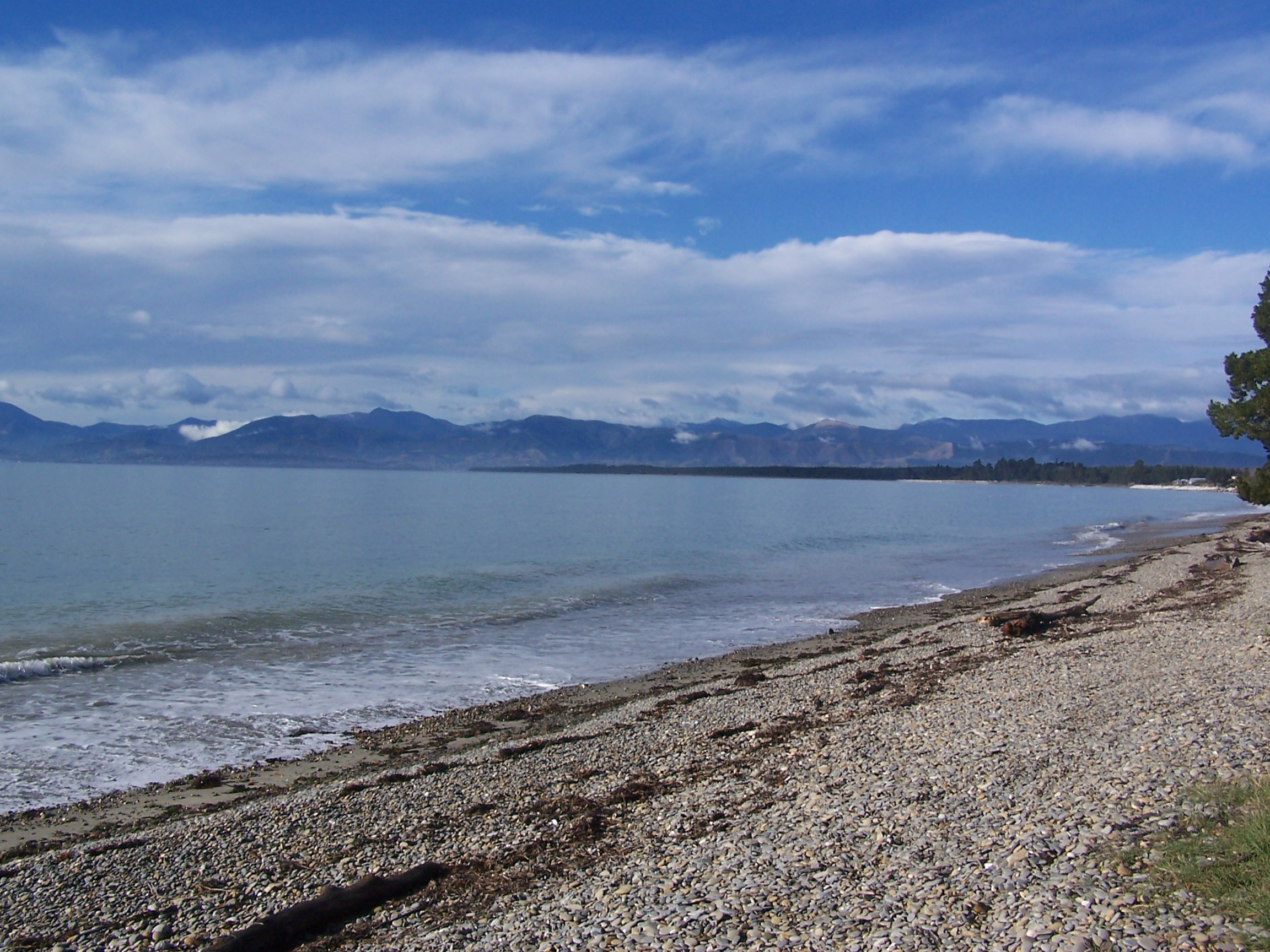
- The view from Ruby Bay beach across Tasman Bay to Nelson and the Barnicoat Range.
- Interactive map of Ruby Bay
- Coordinates: 41.236°S 173.083°E
- Country: New Zealand
- Territorial authority: Tasman
- Ward: Moutere-Waimea Ward
- Electorates: West Coast-Tasman; Te Tai Tonga (Māori)

Government
  - Territorial Authority: Tasman District Council
  - Mayor of Tasman: Tim King
  - West Coast-Tasman MP: Maureen Pugh
  - Te Tai Tonga MP: Tākuta Ferris

Area
  - Total: 4.83 km^{2} (1.86 sq mi)

Population (June 2025)
  - Total: 810
  - Density: 170/km^{2} (430/sq mi)
- Postcode(s): 7005, 7173
- Area code: 03

Ruby Bay is a settlement in the Tasman District of New Zealand's upper South Island. It is located between Māpua and Tasman on Te Mamaku / Ruby Bay. Ruby Bay was named after small 'rubies' (red chert) found within the moutere gravel.

== Demographics ==
Ruby Bay is described by Statistics New Zealand as a rural settlement. It covers 4.83 km^{2} (1.86 sq mi) and had an estimated population of 810 as of June 2025, with a population density of 168 people per km^{2}. It is part of the larger Ruby Bay statistical area.

Historical population for the settlement
Year	Pop.	±% p.a.
2006	555	—
2013	684	+3.03%
2018	765	+2.26%
2023	795	+0.77%
The 2006 population is for a smaller area of 2.96 km^{2}. Source:

Ruby Bay had a population of 795 in the 2023 New Zealand census, an increase of 30 people (3.9%) since the 2018 census, and an increase of 111 people (16.2%) since the 2013 census. There were 393 males and 402 females in 342 dwellings. 1.9% of people identified as LGBTIQ+. The median age was 57.5 years (compared with 38.1 years nationally). There were 96 people (12.1%) aged under 15 years, 66 (8.3%) aged 15 to 29, 363 (45.7%) aged 30 to 64, and 270 (34.0%) aged 65 or older.

People could identify as more than one ethnicity. The results were 96.2% European (Pākehā); 3.8% Māori; 1.5% Pasifika; 1.1% Asian; 0.8% Middle Eastern, Latin American and African New Zealanders (MELAA); and 2.6% other, which includes people giving their ethnicity as "New Zealander". English was spoken by 98.9%, Māori by 1.1%, Samoan by 0.4%, and other languages by 9.8%. No language could be spoken by 1.1% (e.g. too young to talk). The percentage of people born overseas was 30.9, compared with 28.8% nationally.

Religious affiliations were 23.8% Christian, 0.4% Hindu, 0.4% Buddhist, 0.4% New Age, 0.4% Jewish, and 0.4% other religions. People who answered that they had no religion were 65.3%, and 9.4% of people did not answer the census question.

Of those at least 15 years old, 243 (34.8%) people had a bachelor's or higher degree, 315 (45.1%) had a post-high school certificate or diploma, and 138 (19.7%) people exclusively held high school qualifications. The median income was $36,800, compared with $41,500 nationally. 108 people (15.5%) earned over $100,000 compared to 12.1% nationally. The employment status of those at least 15 was 252 (36.1%) full-time, 102 (14.6%) part-time, and 18 (2.6%) unemployed.

=== Ruby Bay statistical area ===
Ruby Bay statistical area covers 11.72 km^{2} (4.53 sq mi) and had an estimated population of 1,460 as of June 2025, with a population density of 125 people per km^{2}.

Historical population
Year	Pop.	±% p.a.
2013	1,143	—
2018	1,356	+3.48%
2023	1,434	+1.12%

Ruby Bay had a population of 1,434 in the 2023 New Zealand census, an increase of 78 people (5.8%) since the 2018 census, and an increase of 291 people (25.5%) since the 2013 census. There were 705 males, 726 females, and 3 people of other genders in 573 dwellings. 2.1% of people identified as LGBTIQ+. The median age was 55.0 years (compared with 38.1 years nationally). There were 192 people (13.4%) aged under 15 years, 135 (9.4%) aged 15 to 29, 693 (48.3%) aged 30 to 64, and 414 (28.9%) aged 65 or older.

People could identify as more than one ethnicity. The results were 95.4% European (Pākehā); 5.9% Māori; 1.0% Pasifika; 1.5% Asian; 0.4% Middle Eastern, Latin American and African New Zealanders (MELAA); and 3.3% other, which includes people giving their ethnicity as "New Zealander". English was spoken by 98.7%, Māori by 1.3%, Samoan by 0.2%, and other languages by 10.0%. No language could be spoken by 1.0% (e.g. too young to talk). New Zealand Sign Language was known by 0.2%. The percentage of people born overseas was 29.3, compared with 28.8% nationally.

Religious affiliations were 24.5% Christian, 0.2% Hindu, 0.4% Buddhist, 0.4% New Age, 0.2% Jewish, and 0.4% other religions. People who answered that they had no religion were 65.3%, and 8.8% of people did not answer the census question.

Of those at least 15 years old, 432 (34.8%) people had a bachelor's or higher degree, 585 (47.1%) had a post-high school certificate or diploma, and 219 (17.6%) people exclusively held high school qualifications. The median income was $37,700, compared with $41,500 nationally. 186 people (15.0%) earned over $100,000 compared to 12.1% nationally. The employment status of those at least 15 was 501 (40.3%) full-time, 201 (16.2%) part-time, and 24 (1.9%) unemployed.
