= Ngāti Rārua =

Māori iwi (tribe) in Aotearoa New Zealand

- Iwi (tribe) in Māoridom
- Rohe (region): Nelson, Marlborough and Tasman Districts
- Waka (canoe): Tainui
- Population: 5,000
- Website: www.ngatirarua.co.nz

Ngāti Rārua are a Māori tribe (iwi) of the Tainui tribal confederation.

Ngāti Rārua stem from the marriage of Rārua-ioio and Tū-pāhau and, like other Tainui tribes, (Note: Tainui identify collectively as the descendants of the polynesian peoples who arrived in New Zealand aboard the migration canoe Tainui.) had their original home in the Waikato, specifically on the west coast of the King Country region, at Kāwhia, Marokopa and Waikawau. In 1821 Ngāti Rārua moved southwards in a series of migrations (heke) led by Te Rauparaha of Ngāti Toa which saw the iwi relocate to Nelson and Marlborough in the upper South Island.

Ngāti Rārua's tribal lands (rohe) overlap those of Ngāti Koata, Ngāti Tama, Te Āti Awa, Ngāti Kuia, Ngāti Apa ki te Rā Tō and Rangitāne. Since their arrival in the upper South Island (Te Tau Ihu), Ngāti Rārua have maintained continuous occupation (ahi kā) in Golden Bay / Mohua, as well as various locations in the Abel Tasman National Park, Mārahau, Kaiteriteri, Riwaka, Motueka, Nelson and Wairau.

== Hapū ==
- Ngāti Tūrangāpeke
- Ngāti Pare-Te-Ata
- Ngāti Paretona
- Ngāti Kairārunga
- Te Arawāere

== Marae ==
- Te Āwhina marae (Tūrangāpeke), Motueka
- Wairau Pā (Wairau), Blenheim
- Hauhunga Marae (Parerārua), Blenheim
- Whakatū Marae (Kākāti), Nelson
- Onetahua Marae (Te Ao Mārama), Tākaka

== Notable people ==
- Jamie Joseph, former All Black and current head coach of the Japanese national rugby union team
- Sandra Morrison, professor at Te Pua Wananga ki te Ao (the Faculty of Maori and Indigenous Studies) of University of Waikato

== See also ==
- List of Māori iwi
