= Moturoa / Rabbit Island =

Small island in New Zealand

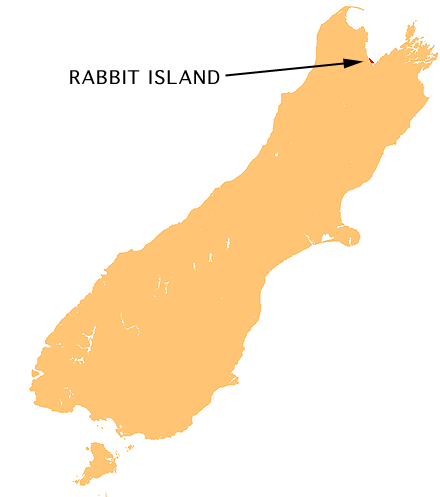
- Location of Rabbit Island

Geography
- Location: Tasman Bay / Te Tai-o-Aorere
- Coordinates: 41.2709°S 173.1476°E
- Area: 15 km^{2} (5.8 sq mi)
- Length: 8 km (5 mi)

Administration
- New Zealand

Demographics
- Population: 0

Moturoa / Rabbit Island is a small island that lies across the southernmost part of Tasman Bay / Te Tai-o-Aorere, on the northern coast of New Zealand's South Island. The long narrow island runs east–west for 8 kilometres (5 mi), and covers 15 km^{2} (5.8 sq mi).

It lies opposite the mouth of the Waimea River, 7 kilometres (4.3 mi) to the west of Richmond. It was formed about 7000 years ago as several barrier islands accumulated near the mouth of the Waimea River. There is evidence of Māori occupation for over 800 years. The original vegetation comprised tussock, manuka scrub and totara forest further inland.

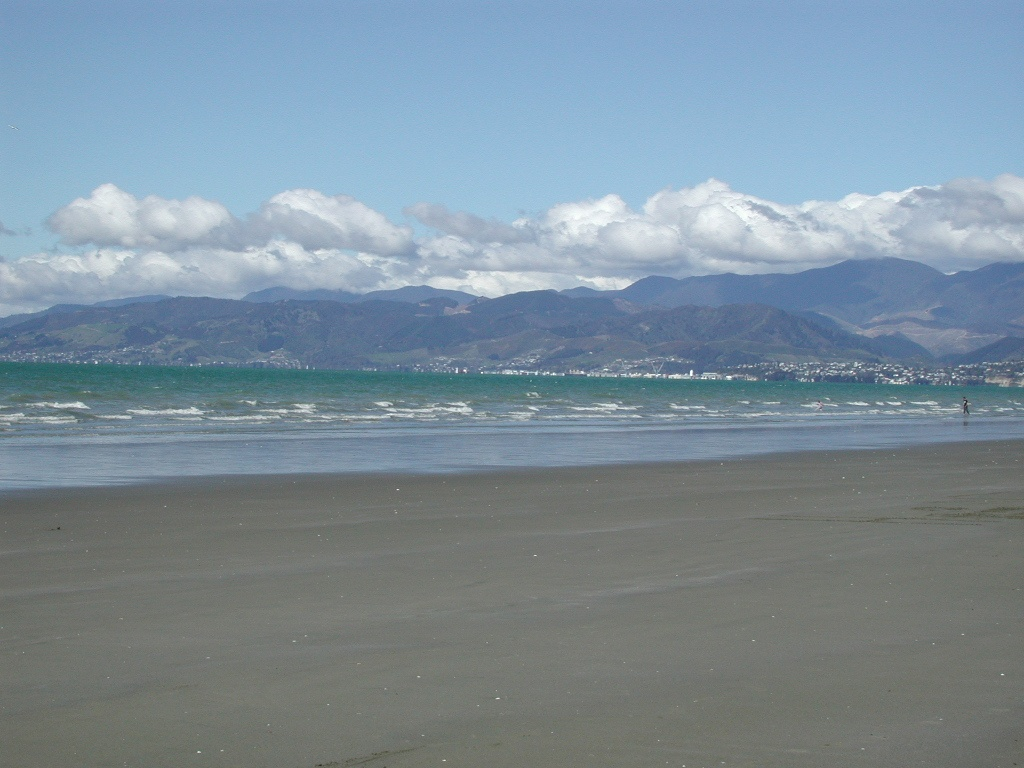
Beach on Rabbit Island near Nelson

The Rabbit Island Recreation Reserve contains three islands, Rabbit Island, Rough Island and Bird Island, and became a public reserve in 1908. Rabbit Island, with its long, safe swimming beach, is a popular beach resort to the residents of Motueka, Wakefield, Brightwater, Richmond, Māpua, Stoke and Nelson.

A medium-sized causeway spans a tidal area and joins the mainland to Rabbit Island. There is a large grassed area after this bridge and a Fire Hazard sign ("Keep it Green"). Large areas of the relatively flat islands are covered in pine plantation forest. The beach proper contains vast and mountainous sand dunes topped with masses of cone-bearing pines, with exposed roots, extending for long distances along the island.

The Tasman's Great Taste Trail includes a cycle route from Richmond to Motueka that runs through Rabbit Island. The Māpua ferry forms part of the Great Taste Trail, and provides a connection from the wharf at Māpua across the narrow channel to Rabbit Island. In 2014, the Nelson Cycle Trail Trust reported that 16,000 cyclists had used the Māpua ferry.

There is also a newly established equestrian area. The reserve area is closed to the public from dusk to 5 am.

In August 2014, the name of the island was officially altered to Moturoa / Rabbit Island.

== See also ==
- List of islands of New Zealand
- List of islands
- Desert island
