= Thomas Champion (priest) =

New Zealand WWII military chaplain

Thomas Eric Champion was a New Zealand Anglican priest in the twentieth century.

Champion was educated at Moore Theological College; and ordained deacon in 1937, and priest in 1938.

After a curacy in Wairau, he was the incumbent at Picton. He was a chaplain to the New Zealand Armed Forces during World War II. When peace returned he became vicar of All Saints, Nelson; and archdeacon of Waimea from 1949 until 1956.
