= Riuwaka River =

River in New Zealand

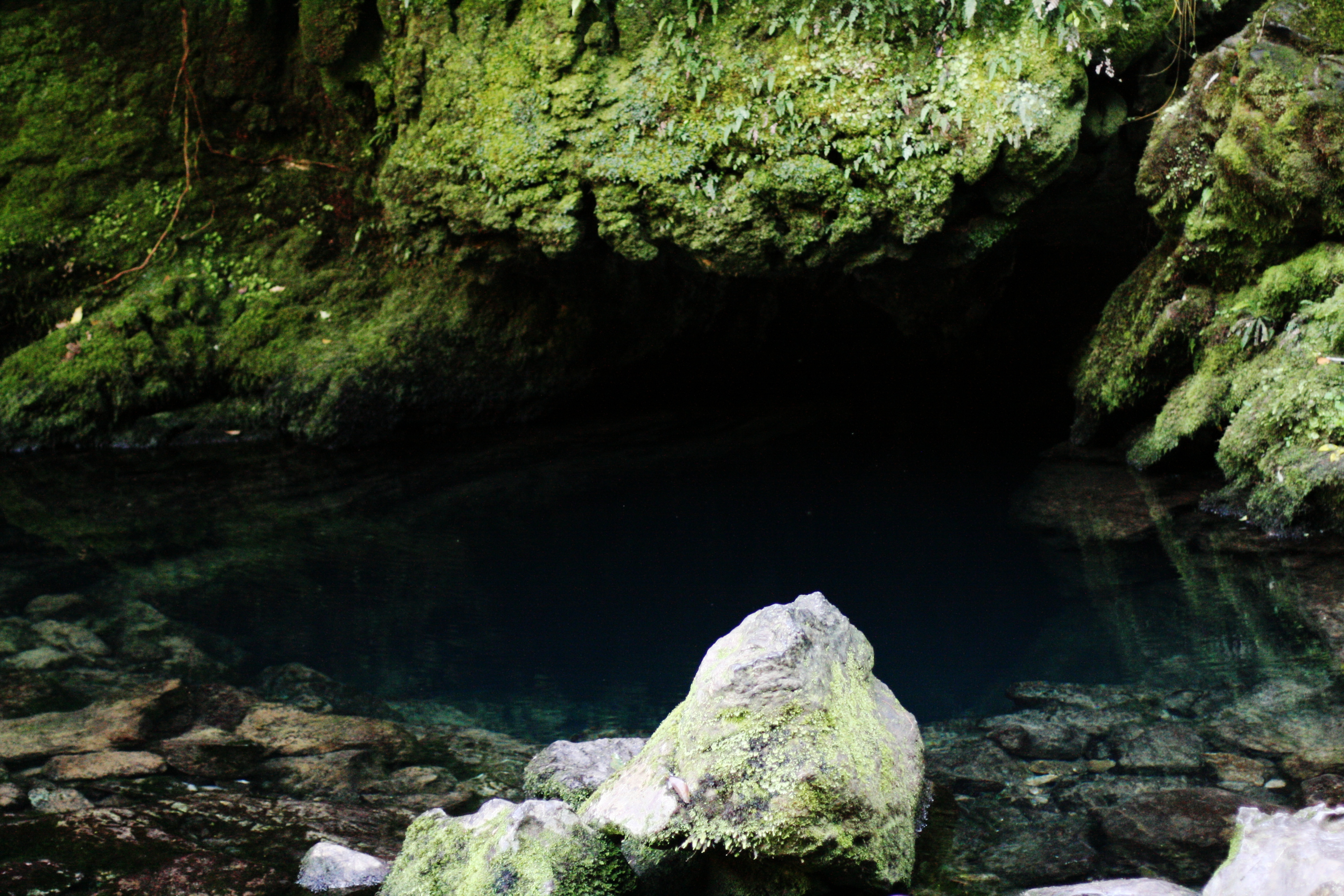
- The Riuwaka Resurgence
- Route of the Riuwaka River
- Mouth of the Riuwaka River Riuwaka River (South Island)

Location
- Country: New Zealand

Physical characteristics
- Source: Riuwaka Resurgence (north branch)
  - coordinates: 41.0312°S 172.8977°E
- 2nd source: Wharepapa / Arthur Range (south branch)
  - coordinates: 41.1247°S 172.8254°E
- Mouth
  - location: Tasman Bay
  - coordinates: 41°03′53″S 173°00′07″E

Basin features
- Progression: Riuwaka River → Tasman Bay → Tasman Sea
- Tributaries
  - left: Flat Creek, Foley Creek
  - right: Jordan River

The Riuwaka River, formerly known as the Riwaka River, is located in the Nelson region in the northwest of New Zealand's South Island. It flows for 20 kilometres, entering Tasman Bay close to the town of Riwaka, 10 kilometres north of Motueka.

The valleys of the Riuwaka and nearby Tākaka River form part of the pass over which the only road between Tasman Bay and Golden Bay runs.

For part of its journey, the river flows underground through limestone caves, returning to the open air at The Riuwaka Resurgence. This spot is popular with both holidaymakers and divers, as the water is always crystal clear, and is very cold even in the heat of mid-summer.

The name of the river was officially altered to Riuwaka River in August 2014, following the Treaty of Waitangi settlements between the Crown and local iwi Ngāti Rārua and Te Atiawa o Te Waka-a-Māui.

== See also ==
- List of caves in New Zealand
