= State Highway 60 (New Zealand) =

Road in New Zealand

State Highway 60

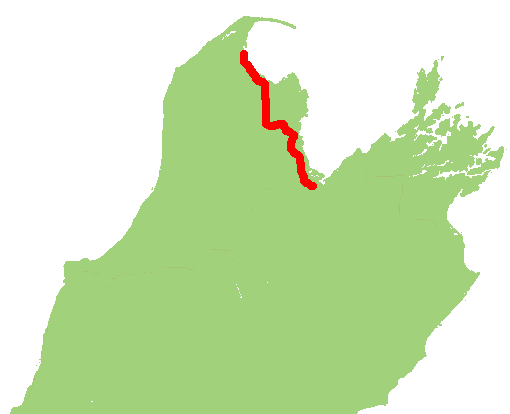

Route information
- Maintained by NZ Transport Agency Waka Kotahi
- Length: 116 km (72 mi)

Major junctions
- South end: SH 6 (Gladstone Road/Main Road Hope) at Richmond
- North end: Collingwood

Location
- Country: New Zealand
- Primary destinations: Motueka, Riwaka, Tākaka

Highway system
- New Zealand state highways; Motorways and expressways; List
← SH 59	→ SH 61

State Highway 60 is a state highway servicing the far northwest of the South Island of New Zealand. Running between the settlements of Richmond (south of Nelson) and Collingwood, it is 116 kilometres (72 mi) long and lies entirely within the Tasman District. It is the northernmost highway in the South Island and is a popular tourist route, servicing Motueka, Abel Tasman National Park, Golden Bay, and Farewell Spit.

== Route ==
The highway starts at Richmond at a roundabout junction with SH 6 and proceeds in the northwesterly direction across the Waimea Plains. Near Māpua, the road deviates onto the Ruby Bay bypass (Mamaku Drive) and emerges on the shores of the Moutere Inlet adjacent to Tasman Village. The highway then passes along the edge of Motueka Estuary and through the major town of Motueka. Just past Riwaka, the road to Kaiteretere and Abel Tasman National Park branches off to the right while SH 60 branches to the left. The highway then rises towards Tākaka Hill (elevation 791 metres above sea level) and the notorious Eureka Bend. The highway then descends into the Tākaka Valley and passes through the town of Tākaka. The highway then hugs the coastline of Golden Bay before terminating just outside the township of Collingwood.

== History ==
At first there was no road connecting the coastal areas about Bronte, Māpua and Tasman. Early settlers had roads from landing sites on Waimea Inlet and along ridges, and they avoided crossing the peripheral swampy valleys. When the Coastal Highway was constructed it was gravel and the Inland (Moutere) Highway was the main highway. At some point in about the 1970s, the coastal route became the main route.

In 2003, the terminus at Collingwood was curtailed 1.1 km to the intersection of Collingwoood-Bainham Main Road.

Until 2010, before the construction of the Ruby Bay bypass, SH 60 followed the coastline around Māpua.

== Gallery ==
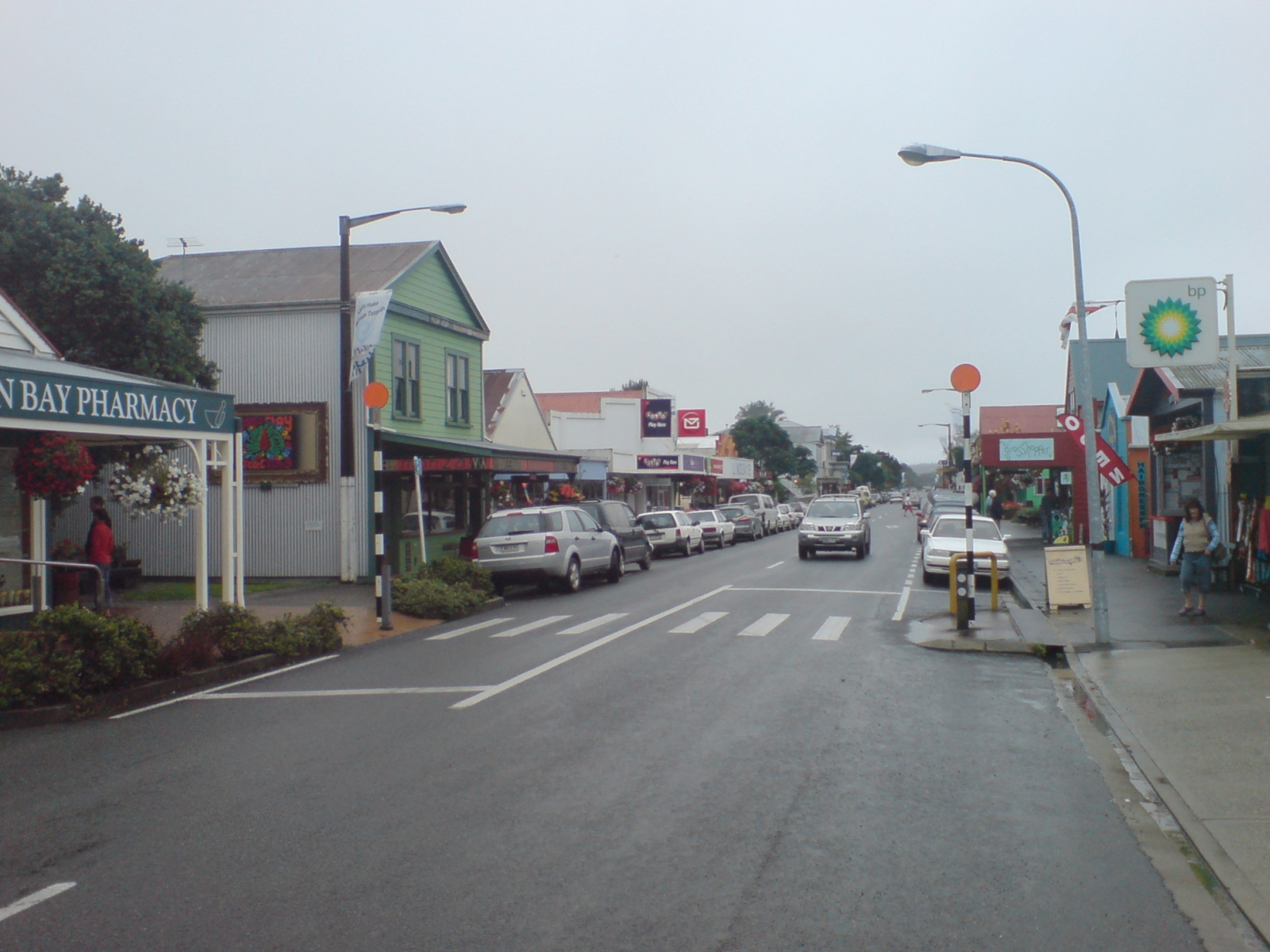
SH 60 as Commercial Street passing through Tākaka

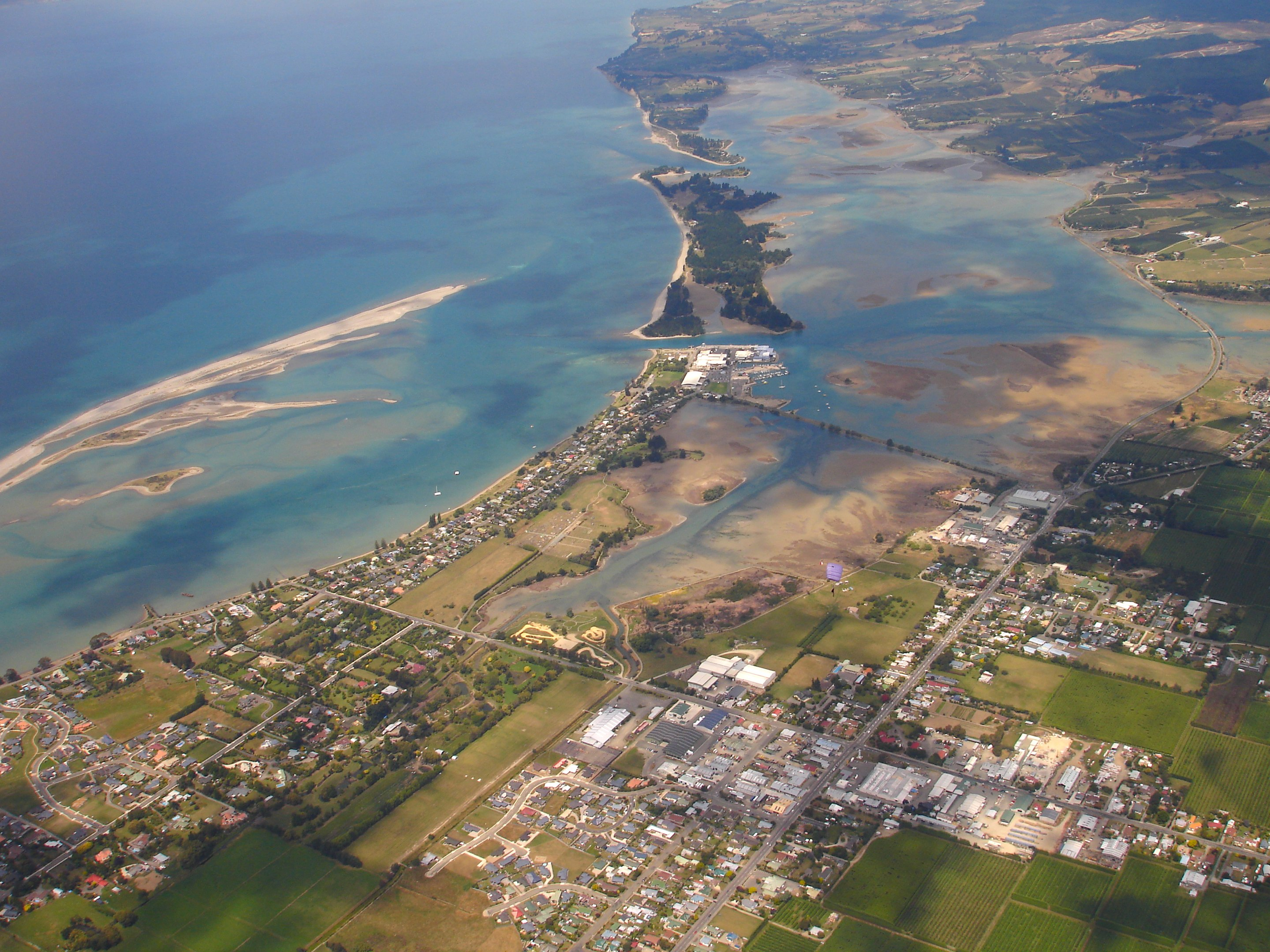
Aerial view of SH 60 passing through the southern section of Motueka

== See also ==
- List of New Zealand state highways
