= Kaiteriteri =

Town in Tasman, New Zealand

Kaiteretere
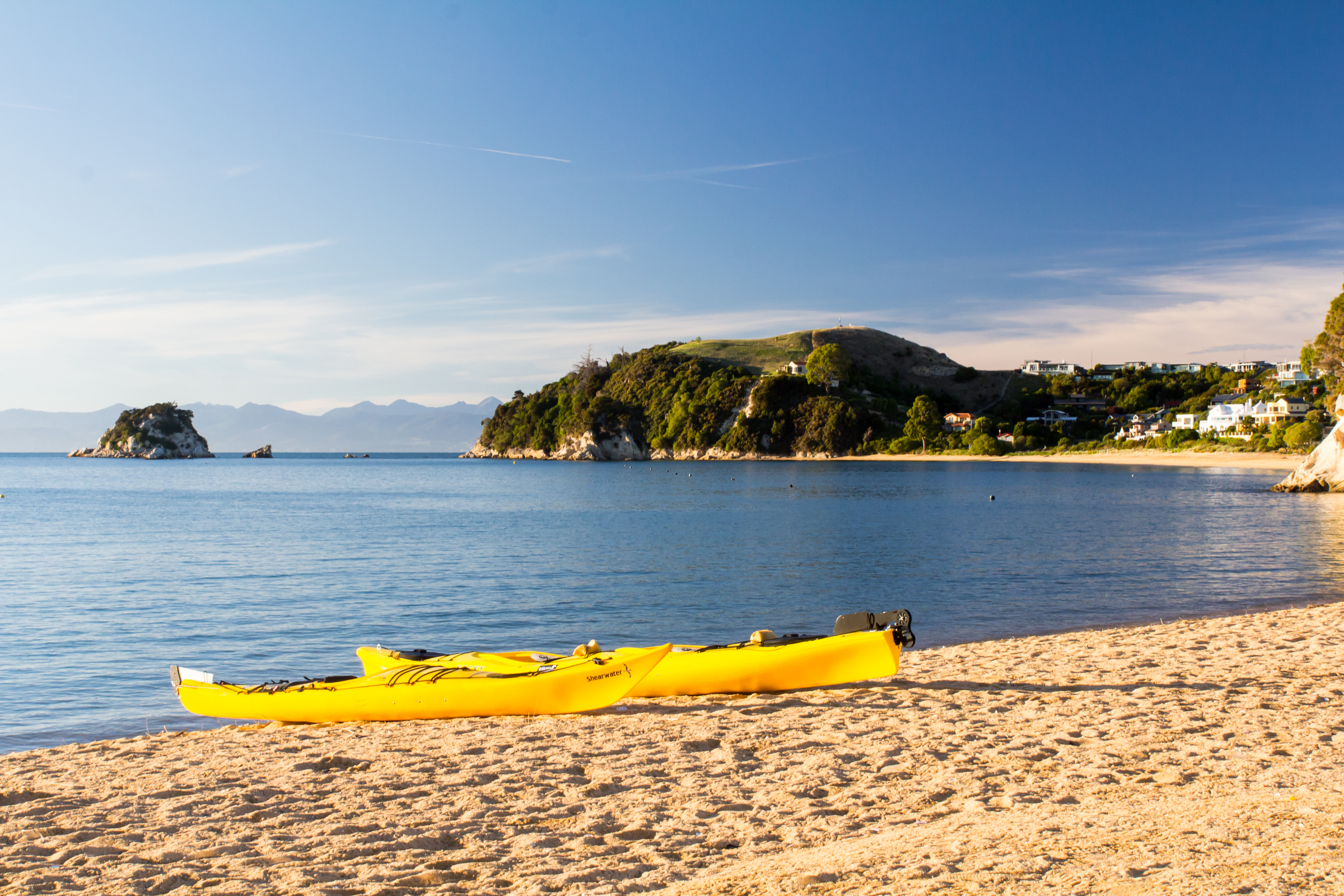
- Interactive map of Kaiteretere
- Coordinates: 41.037°S 173.017°E
- Country: New Zealand
- Territorial authority: Tasman
- Ward: Motueka Ward
- Community: Motueka Community
- Electorates: West Coast-Tasman; Te Tai Tonga (Māori)

Government
  - Territorial Authority: Tasman District Council
  - Mayor of Tasman: Tim King
  - West Coast-Tasman MP: Maureen Pugh
  - Te Tai Tonga MP: Tākuta Ferris

Area
  - Total: 3.55 km^{2} (1.37 sq mi)

Population (June 2025)
  - Total: 490
  - Density: 140/km^{2} (360/sq mi)
- Time zone: UTC+12 (NZST)
  - Summer (DST): UTC+13 (NZDT)
- Postcode: 7197
- Area code: 03

Kaiteretere, also known as Kaiteriteri, is a town and seaside resort in the Tasman Region of the South Island of New Zealand. It is close to both Mārahau, the main gateway to Abel Tasman National Park, and the town of Motueka.

Kaiteretere is a small coastal town reliant on tourism for much of its income, and there are many accommodation providers, cafés, pubs and restaurants. It is also a hub for the adventure tourism throughout the area and into Abel Tasman National Park. A number of walking and mountainbiking trails, including the Kaiteriteri Mountain Bike Park, begin from or pass through the town.

== Name ==
For many years Kaiteretere was commonly known by the misspelling "Kaiteriteri", which first appears on official documents in 1859 (along with the variants Kaiteratera and Kaitiriteri). The name was officially changed by the New Zealand Geographic Board on 6 November 2026. Kaiteretere means "to eat quickly", and one account tells how a group of Māori eating on an island in the bay, being surprised by a noise, and, fearing an ambush, fled to the mainland by waka, and finished their meal there. The renaming was part of Te Tere ā Nuku (Nelson Tenths) Act 2026, which returned 3,068 hectares (7,580 acres) of land to local Māori, as compensation for the government failing in the 1840s to reserve a tenth of land purchased in the settlement of Nelson for its original owners.

== Demographics ==
Kaiteretere is described by Statistics New Zealand as a rural settlement. It covers 3.55 km^{2} (1.37 sq mi) and had an estimated population of 490 as of June 2025, with a population density of 138 people per km^{2}. It is part of the larger Kaiteriteri-Riwaka statistical area.

Historical population
Year	Pop.	±% p.a.
2006	309	—
2013	354	+1.96%
2018	354	+0.00%
2023	456	+5.19%

Kaiteretere had a population of 456 in the 2023 New Zealand census, an increase of 102 people (28.8%) since the 2018 census, and an increase of 102 people (28.8%) since the 2013 census. There were 228 males and 228 females in 213 dwellings. 3.3% of people identified as LGBTIQ+. The median age was 61.2 years (compared with 38.1 years nationally). There were 39 people (8.6%) aged under 15 years, 33 (7.2%) aged 15 to 29, 192 (42.1%) aged 30 to 64, and 192 (42.1%) aged 65 or older.

People could identify as more than one ethnicity. The results were 96.7% European (Pākehā); 4.6% Māori; 1.3% Asian; 0.7% Middle Eastern, Latin American and African New Zealanders (MELAA); and 3.9% other, which includes people giving their ethnicity as "New Zealander". English was spoken by 98.7%, Māori by 1.3%, and other languages by 9.9%. No language could be spoken by 0.7% (e.g. too young to talk). The percentage of people born overseas was 21.7, compared with 28.8% nationally.

Religious affiliations were 32.2% Christian, 0.7% Māori religious beliefs, 0.7% Buddhist, 2.0% New Age, and 0.7% other religions. People who answered that they had no religion were 57.2%, and 7.9% of people did not answer the census question.

Of those at least 15 years old, 96 (23.0%) people had a bachelor's or higher degree, 231 (55.4%) had a post-high school certificate or diploma, and 87 (20.9%) people exclusively held high school qualifications. The median income was $34,200, compared with $41,500 nationally. 42 people (10.1%) earned over $100,000 compared to 12.1% nationally. The employment status of those at least 15 was 141 (33.8%) full-time, 78 (18.7%) part-time, and 3 (0.7%) unemployed.
