= Waimea River (Tasman) =

River in New Zealand

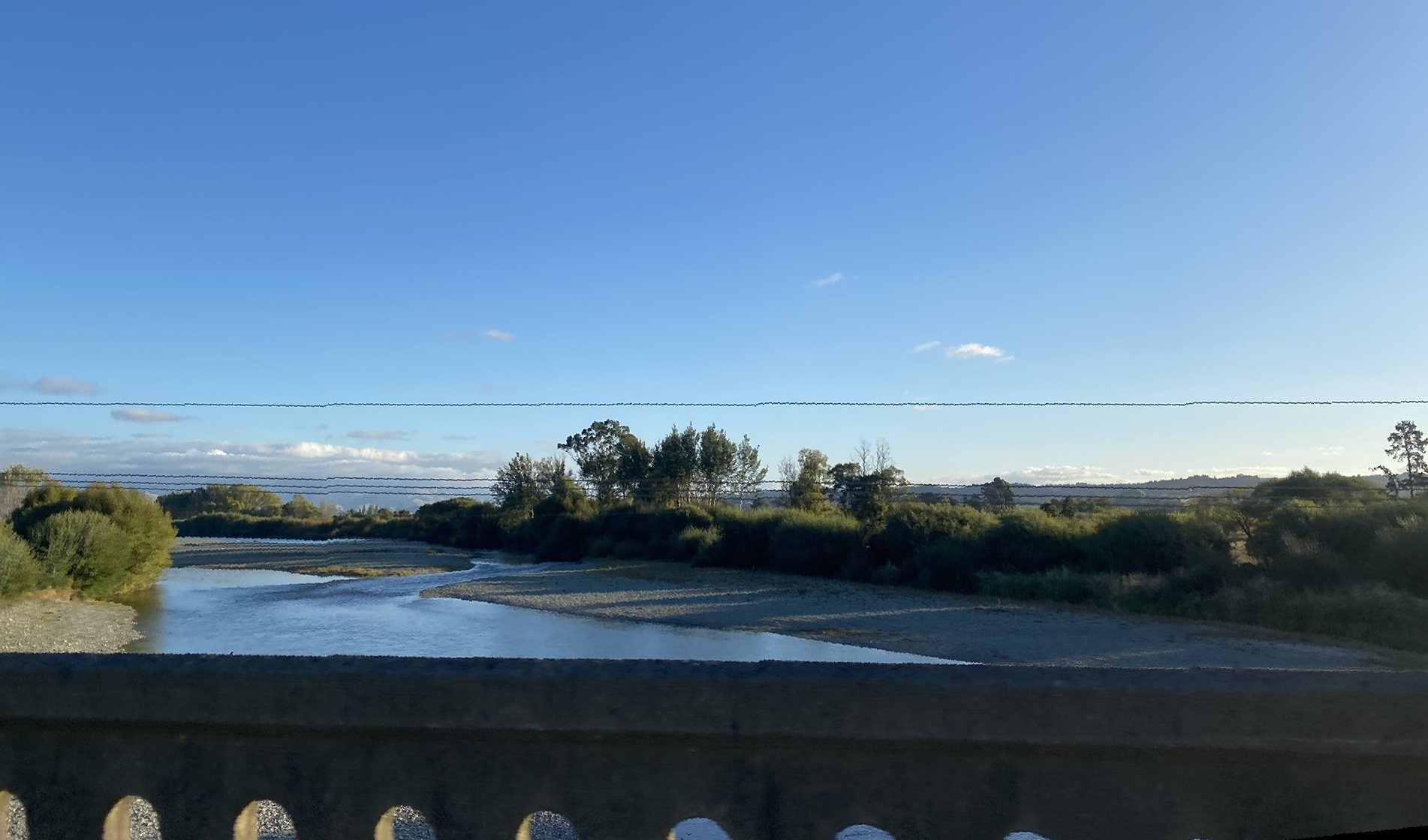
- Waimea River seen from State Highway 60

Physical characteristics
- Source
  - coordinates: 41.3276°S 173.1256°E
- Length: 6 km (3.7 mi)

The Waimea River is located in the north of the South Island of New Zealand. It is formed from the confluence of the Wairoa River and the Wai-iti River, which meet near Brightwater. The combined waters flow into Tasman Bay / Te Tai-o-Aorere near Appleby, opposite Moturoa / Rabbit Island.
