= Riwaka =

Town in Tasman, New Zealand

Riwaka Riuwaka (Māori)
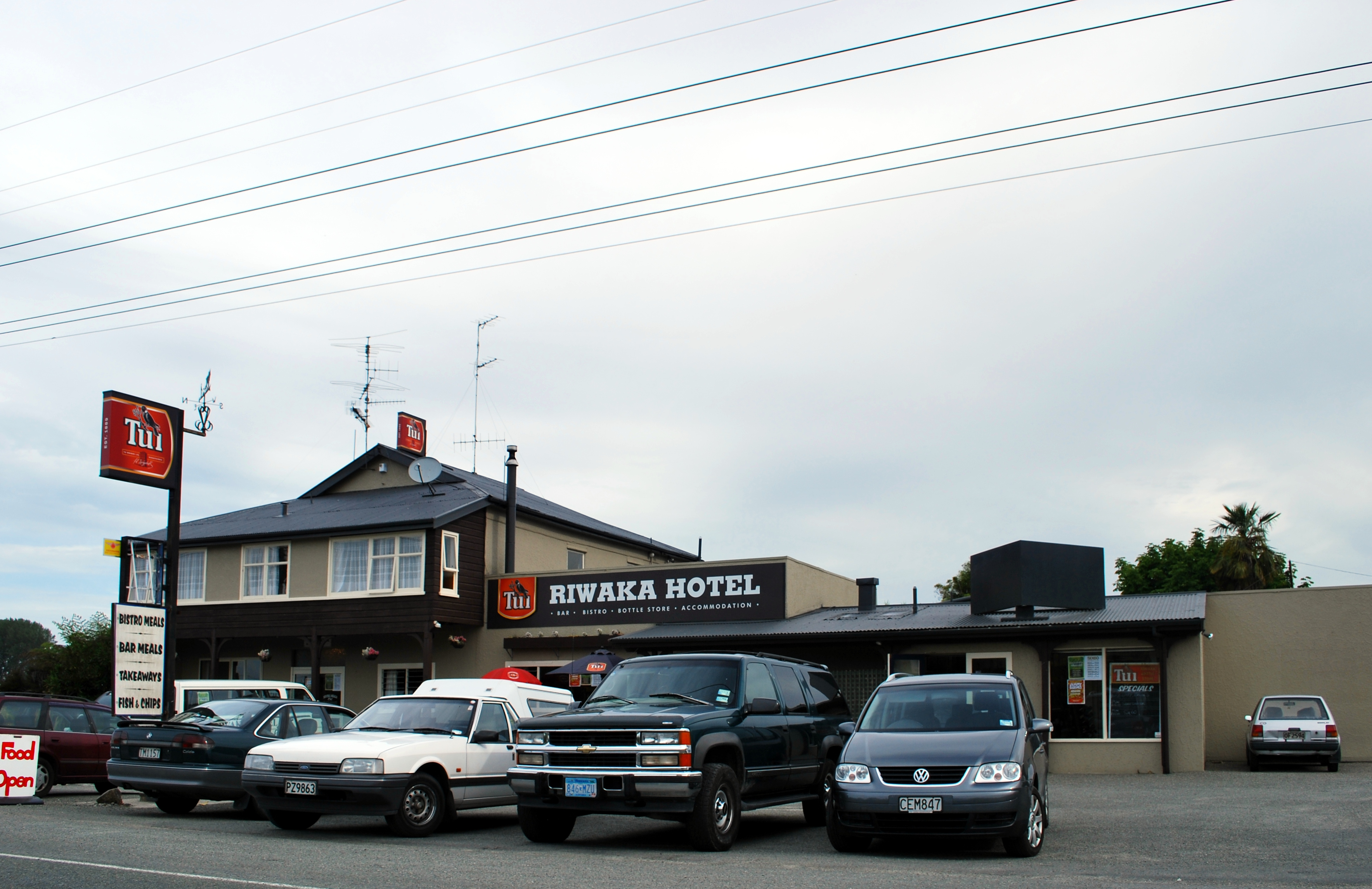
- The Riwaka Hotel
- Interactive map of Riwaka
- Coordinates: 41°5′S 173°0′E
- Country: New Zealand
- Territorial authority: Tasman
- Ward: Motueka Ward
- Community: Motueka Community
- Electorates: West Coast-Tasman; Te Tai Tonga (Māori)

Government
  - Territorial authority: Tasman District Council
  - Mayor of Tasman: Tim King
  - West Coast-Tasman MP: Maureen Pugh
  - Te Tai Tonga MP: Tākuta Ferris

Area
  - Total: 5.49 km^{2} (2.12 sq mi)

Population (June 2025)
  - Total: 740
  - Density: 130/km^{2} (350/sq mi)
- Time zone: UTC+12 (NZST)
  - Summer (DST): UTC+13 (NZDT)
- Area code: 03

Riwaka (Māori: Riuwaka) is a small settlement in the Tasman District of New Zealand's South Island. It lies beside Tasman Bay / Te Tai-o-Aorere, five kilometres north of Motueka, and close to the mouth of the Riuwaka River. The land where the town is based was a swamp known as Tureauraki. Europeans first settled in Riwaka in May 1842. The Riwaka economy has been based around growing tobacco and hops.

== Etymology ==
The settlement's name, Riwaka, is a corruption of the Māori name Riuwaka, which derives from riu meaning bilge or interior, and waka meaning canoe. The name can be interpreted as the hull of the canoe.

The name of the nearby river was officially altered from Riwaka River to Riuwaka River in August 2014, following the Treaty of Waitangi settlements between the Crown and local iwi Ngāti Rārua and Te Atiawa o Te Waka-a-Māui.

== Demographics ==
Riwaka is described by Statistics New Zealand as a rural settlement. It covers 5.49 km^{2} (2.12 sq mi) and had an estimated population of 740 as of June 2025, with a population density of 135 people per km^{2}. It is part of the larger Kaiteriteri-Riwaka statistical area.

Historical population for Riwaka
Year	Pop.	±% p.a.
2006	630	—
2013	660	+0.67%
2018	765	+3.00%
2023	756	−0.24%

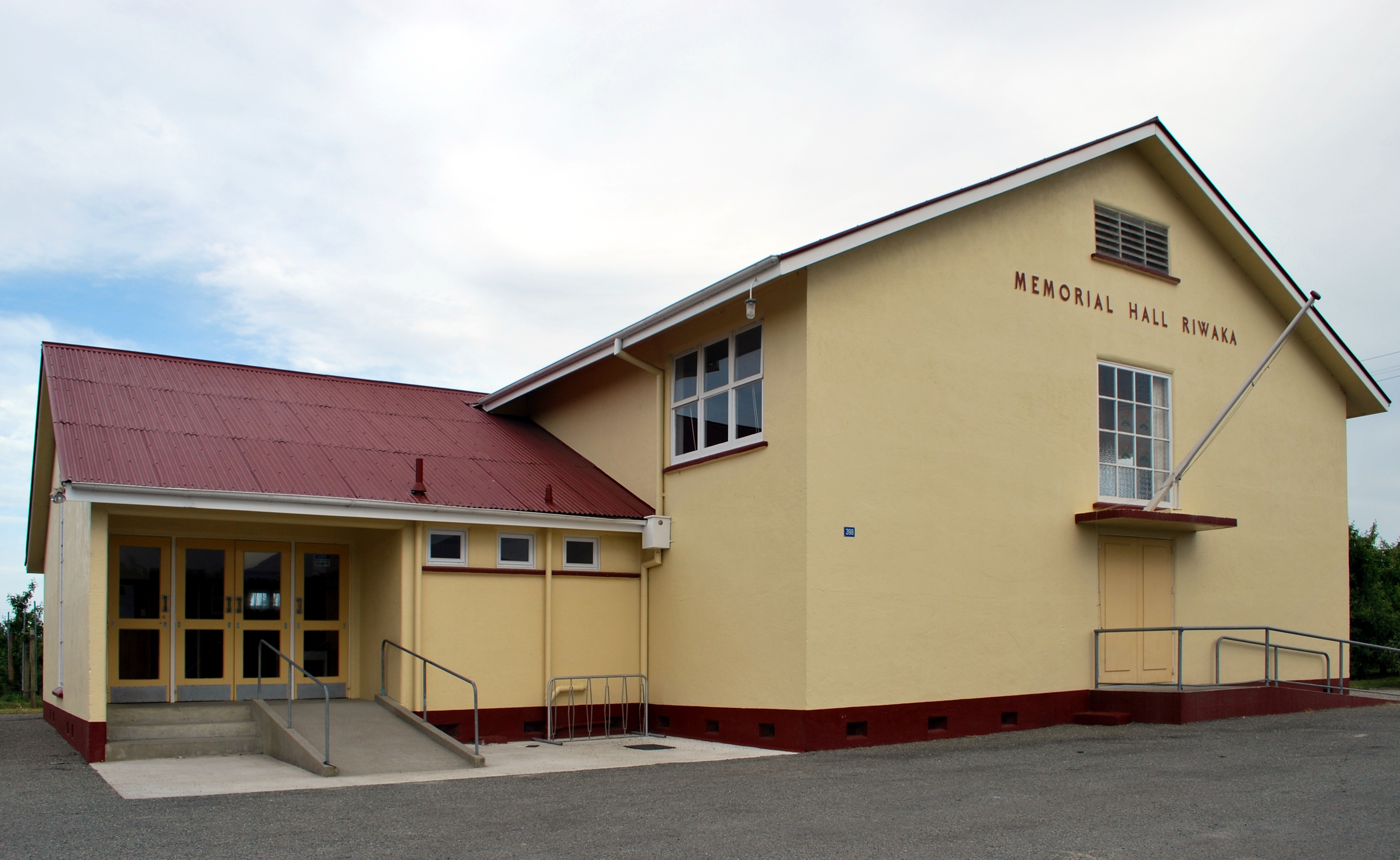
Riwaka Memorial Hall

Rīwaka had a population of 756 in the 2023 New Zealand census, a decrease of 9 people (−1.2%) since the 2018 census, and an increase of 96 people (14.5%) since the 2013 census. There were 381 males, 375 females, and 3 people of other genders in 273 dwellings. 3.2% of people identified as LGBTIQ+. The median age was 42.8 years (compared with 38.1 years nationally). There were 123 people (16.3%) aged under 15 years, 138 (18.3%) aged 15 to 29, 354 (46.8%) aged 30 to 64, and 138 (18.3%) aged 65 or older.

People could identify as more than one ethnicity. The results were 87.3% European (Pākehā); 14.7% Māori; 5.2% Pasifika; 3.2% Asian; 0.4% Middle Eastern, Latin American and African New Zealanders (MELAA); and 5.6% other, which includes people giving their ethnicity as "New Zealander". English was spoken by 98.4%, Māori by 2.4%, Samoan by 2.4%, and other languages by 7.1%. No language could be spoken by 0.8% (e.g. too young to talk). New Zealand Sign Language was known by 0.4%. The percentage of people born overseas was 20.2, compared with 28.8% nationally.

Religious affiliations were 19.8% Christian, 0.4% Islam, 0.4% Māori religious beliefs, 0.4% Buddhist, 0.8% New Age, and 2.0% other religions. People who answered that they had no religion were 67.5%, and 9.5% of people did not answer the census question.

Of those at least 15 years old, 84 (13.3%) people had a bachelor's or higher degree, 369 (58.3%) had a post-high school certificate or diploma, and 177 (28.0%) people exclusively held high school qualifications. The median income was $36,500, compared with $41,500 nationally. 42 people (6.6%) earned over $100,000 compared to 12.1% nationally. The employment status of those at least 15 was 333 (52.6%) full-time, 96 (15.2%) part-time, and 12 (1.9%) unemployed.

=== Kaiteriteri-Riwaka statistical area ===
Kaiteriteri-Riwaka statistical area, which also includes Mārahau and Kaiteriteri, covers 29.48 km^{2} (11.38 sq mi) and had an estimated population of 2,020 as of June 2025, with a population density of 69 people per km^{2}.

Historical population for Kaiteriteri-Riwaka
Year	Pop.	±% p.a.
2006	1,464	—
2013	1,539	+0.72%
2018	1,770	+2.84%
2023	1,992	+2.39%
The 2006 population is for a smaller area of 28.57 km^{2}. Source:

Kaiteriteri-Rīwaka had a population of 1,992 in the 2023 New Zealand census, an increase of 222 people (12.5%) since the 2018 census, and an increase of 453 people (29.4%) since the 2013 census. There were 1,053 males, 933 females, and 3 people of other genders in 729 dwellings. 2.6% of people identified as LGBTIQ+. The median age was 47.1 years (compared with 38.1 years nationally). There were 267 people (13.4%) aged under 15 years, 315 (15.8%) aged 15 to 29, 933 (46.8%) aged 30 to 64, and 474 (23.8%) aged 65 or older.

People could identify as more than one ethnicity. The results were 83.9% European (Pākehā); 10.5% Māori; 10.2% Pasifika; 2.4% Asian; 0.8% Middle Eastern, Latin American and African New Zealanders (MELAA); and 3.6% other, which includes people giving their ethnicity as "New Zealander". English was spoken by 96.7%, Māori by 2.1%, Samoan by 2.9%, and other languages by 13.0%. No language could be spoken by 1.1% (e.g. too young to talk). New Zealand Sign Language was known by 0.5%. The percentage of people born overseas was 28.5, compared with 28.8% nationally.

Religious affiliations were 28.9% Christian, 0.2% Islam, 0.3% Māori religious beliefs, 0.8% Buddhist, 1.1% New Age, and 1.4% other religions. People who answered that they had no religion were 60.1%, and 7.5% of people did not answer the census question.

Of those at least 15 years old, 306 (17.7%) people had a bachelor's or higher degree, 882 (51.1%) had a post-high school certificate or diploma, and 534 (31.0%) people exclusively held high school qualifications. The median income was $34,400, compared with $41,500 nationally. 117 people (6.8%) earned over $100,000 compared to 12.1% nationally. The employment status of those at least 15 was 810 (47.0%) full-time, 264 (15.3%) part-time, and 48 (2.8%) unemployed.

== Church ==
The Saint Barnabas Anglican church is located on Main Road, Riwaka.

== Education ==
Riwaka School is a co-educational state primary school for Year 1 to 8 students, with a roll of 134 as of July 2026. The school, opened in 1848, is one of the oldest schools in New Zealand.
