= Tasman Bay =

Bay in the South Island of New Zealand

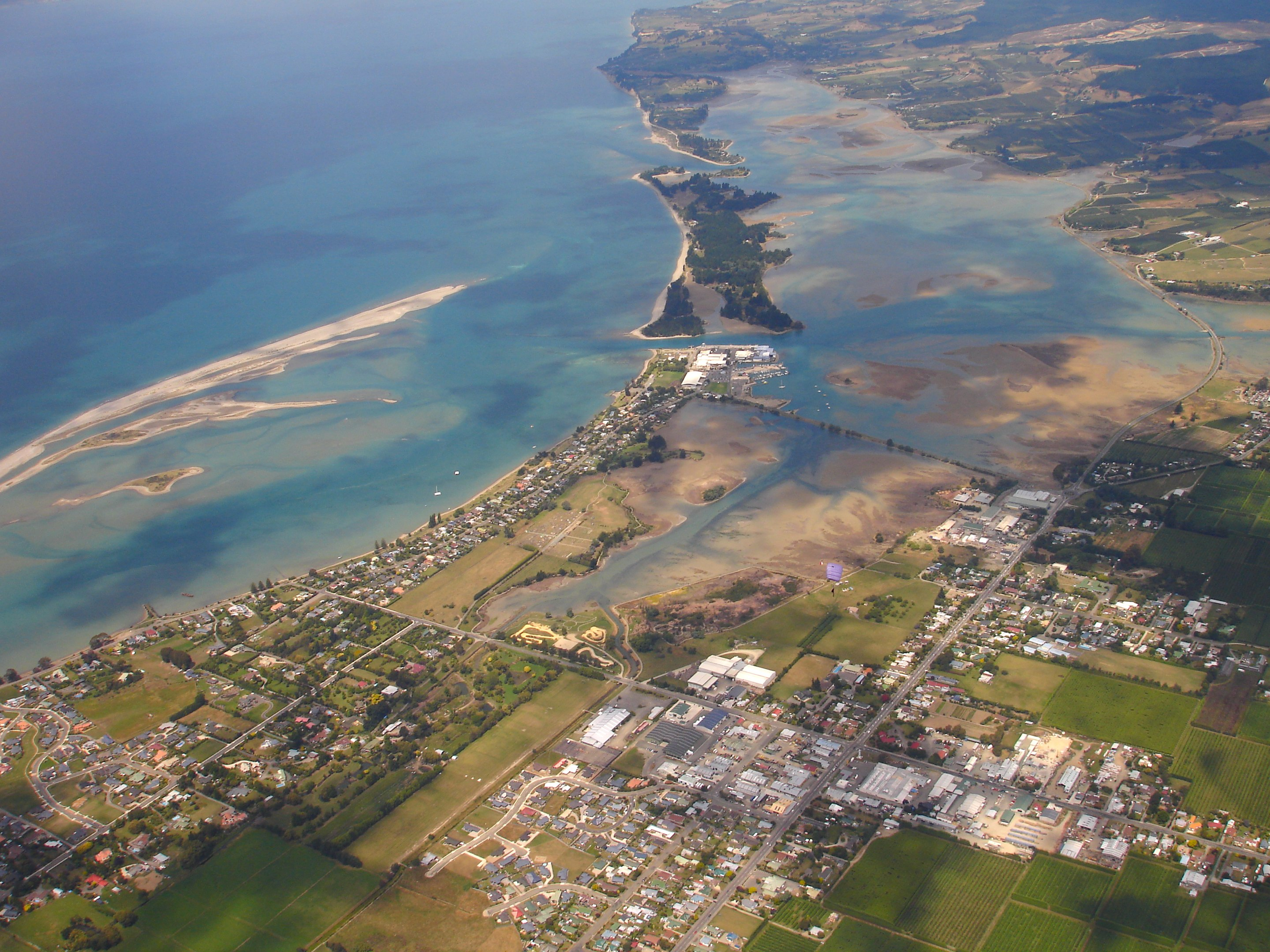
- The coast of Tasman Bay in Motueka
- Interactive map of Tasman Bay
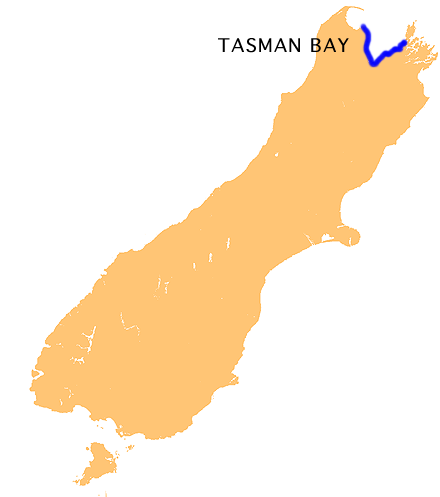
- Location of Tasman Bay
- Location: South Island
- Coordinates: 41°00′S 173°20′E
- Type: Bay
- Part of: Tasman Sea
- Basin countries: New Zealand

Tasman Bay (Māori: Te Tai-o-Aorere; officially Tasman Bay / Te Tai-o-Aorere), originally known in English as Blind Bay, is a large V-shaped bay at the north end of New Zealand's South Island. Located in the centre of the island's northern coast, it stretches along 120 kilometres (75 mi) of coastline and is 70 kilometres (43 mi) across at its widest point. It is an arm of the Tasman Sea, lying on the western approach to Cook Strait.

At the bay's western extremity, the land around the bay is rough and densely forested. Separation Point, the westernmost point of the bay, is located in Abel Tasman National Park and separates Tasman Bay from its smaller neighbour, Golden Bay. To the east, the land is also steep, with the westernmost points of sea-drowned valleys of the Marlborough Sounds. D'Urville Island sits to the northeast of Tasman Bay's easternmost point. Arrow Rock is situated off the coast of Nelson.

The land between these two extremes is more gently rolling, and also includes the coastal plains around the mouth of the Waimea River at the bay's southernmost point. Other rivers entering the sea along the coast of the bay include the Riwaka, the Motueka and Maitai Rivers. The long low form of Rabbit Island is located close to the bay's south coast. Tasman Bay contains the rare rock formation known as the Boulder Bank.

The fertile land around the centre of the bay's coast is extensively cultivated and known for its horticultural crops such as apples, kiwifruit, olives, grapes and hops. In the middle of the twentieth century the Tasman Bay area produced large crops of tobacco. There is a tobacco museum in Motueka. It is also the most densely populated part of the South Island's north coast, and several towns and the city of Nelson are all located close to the shore. These towns include Riwaka, Motueka, Māpua and Richmond.

== History ==
The location's original name, Blind Bay, was given by Captain Cook in 1770. In January 1827, the French explorer Jules Dumont d'Urville arrived in Tasman Bay on the corvette Astrolabe. A number of landmarks around Tasman Bay were named by d'Urville and his crew, including d'Urville Island, French Pass and Torrent Bay. The name of the bay was officially altered to Tasman Bay / Te Tai-o-Aorere in August 2014.
