= List of schools in the Tasman District =

This is a list of schools in the Tasman region of New Zealand's South Island.

Name	Years	Gender	Authority	Location	Decile (Note: The now-defunct socioeconomic decile measured the socioeconomic status of the school catchment area from 1 (the poorest areas) to 10 (the wealthiest areas).) (2015)	EQI (2026)	Roll (Note: The roll for each school changes frequently as students start school for the first time, move between schools, and graduate.) (July 2026)	Website	School number	Opening year
Appleby School	1–8	Coed	State	Appleby	9	430	143		3180	1859
Baton Valley School (closed 1928)	1–8	Coed	State	Baton Valley	-	-	-	-	-	1881
Brightwater School	1–6	Coed	State	Brightwater	9	439	239		3183	1888
Brightwater School for Girls (closed 1889)	1–8	Coed	State	Brightwater	-	-	-	-	-	1881
Brooklyn School	1–8	Coed	State	Brooklyn	5	450	139		3185	-
Central Takaka School	1–6	Coed	State	Tākaka	6	458	39		3225	1896
Collingwood Area School	1–13	Coed	State	Collingwood	7	461	155		290	1859
Dovedale School	1–8	Coed	State	Dovedale	5	447	21		3188	1869, 1938
East Tākaka School (closed 1968)	1–8	Coed	State	East Tākaka	-	-	-	-	-	1874
Eighty-Eight Valley School (closed 1929)	1–8	Coed	State	Eighty-Eight Valley	-	-	-	-	-	1863
Foxhill School (closed 2002)	1–8	Coed	State	Foxhill	-	-	-	-	-	1861
Golden Bay High School (formerly Tākaka District High School)	7–13	Coed	State	Tākaka	6	450	300		292	1862
Golden Downs School (closed 1942)	1–8	Coed	State	Tapawera	-	-	-	-	-	1904
Gordon School (closed 1945)	1–8	Coed	State	Foxhill	-	-	-	-	-	1888
Henley School	1–6	Coed	State	Richmond	8	430	483		3194	1962
Hope School	1–6	Coed	State	Hope	9	429	87		3196	1851
Kiwi School (closed 1942, previously Upper Tadmor School)	1–8	Coed	State	Tapawera	-	-	-	-	-	1901
Korere School (Tapawera) (closed 1942, Upper Motupiko School)	1–8	Coed	State	Tapawera	-	-	-	-	-	1885
Koreke School (Wakefield) (closed 1930)	1–8	Coed	State	Wakefield	-	-	-	-	-	-
Lake Rotoiti School	1–8	Coed	State	Saint Arnaud	8	430	17		3199	1949
Lower Moutere School	1–8	Coed	State	Lower Moutere	5	474	214		3200	1862
Mahana School	1–8	Coed	State	Mahana	9	414	53		3201	1915
Māpua School	1–8	Coed	State	Māpua	10	398	238		3203	1913
Matariki School (closed 1942, formerly Wangapeka School 1907-1912)	1–8	Coed	State	Tapawera	-	-	-	-	-	1907
Motueka High School	9–13	Coed	State	Motueka	5	464	718		298	1955
Motueka Steiner School	1–8	Coed	Private	Motueka		434	85		946	2002
Motueka South School	1–8	Coed	State	Motueka	4	455	170		3206	1958
Motupiko School (closed 1942)	1–8	Coed	State	Tapawera	-	-	-	-	-	1868, 1877
Motupipi School	1–6	Coed	State	Motupipi	7	426	83		3207	1856
Murchison Area School	1–15	Coed	State	Murchison	4	471	165		299	1883
Ngatimoti School	1–8	Coed	State	Ngātīmoti	5	437	69		3212	1868
Orinoco School (closed)	1–8	Coed	State	Ngātīmoti	-	-	-	-	-	1894
Pangatōtara School (closed 1910)	1–8	Coed	State	Pangatotara	-	-	-	-	-	1856
Parklands School (formerly Motueka Primary School 1857-1956)	1–8	Coed	State	Motueka			199		3213	1857
Pigeon Valley School (closed 1950)	1–8	Coed	State	Pigeon Valley	-	-	-	-	-	1888
Pokororo School (closed 1939)	1–8	Coed	State	Pokororo	-	-	-	-	-	1883
Ranzau School	1–6	Coed	State (previously Lutheran)	Hope	9	433	108		3214	1848
Richmond School	1–6	Coed	State	Richmond			500		3216	1846, 1856
River Terrace School (closed 1920)	1–8	Coed	State	Brightwater	-	-	-	-	-	1855
Riwaka School	1–8	Coed	State	Riwaka	5	450	134	-	3217	1848
Salisbury School	–	Girls	State	Richmond	3	517	12		525	1916
Sherry River School (closed 1942)	1–8	Coed	State	Tapawera	-	-	-	-	-	1881
Spring Grove School (closed 1974)	1–8	Coed	State	Brightwater	-	-	-	-	-	1845
St Paul's School	1–8	Coed	State integrated	Richmond	8	404	362		1627	1999
St Peter Chanel School	1–8	Coed	State integrated	Motueka	4	453	90		3222	1957
Stanley Brook School (closed 1942)	1–8	Coed	State	Tapawera	-	-	-	-	-	1880
Tadmor School (closed 1942)	1–8	Coed	State	Tapawera	-	-	-	-	-	1878
Tākaka Primary School	1–6	Coed	State	Tākaka	6	452	127		3226	-
Tapawera School (closed 1942, formerly Motueka Valley School 1876-1907)	1–8	Coed	State	Tapawera	-	-	-	-	-	1876
Tapawera Area School	1–13	Coed	State	Tapawera	4	496	147		297	1975
Tasman Bay Christian School	1–8	Coed	State integrated	Tasman	6	456	47		1178	
Tasman School (formerly Aporo School)	1–8	Coed	State	Tasman	9	414	114		3228	1913
Te Kura Kaupapa Māori o Tuia Te Matangi	1–13	Coed	State	Richmond	4	453	90		628	2012
Tophouse School (closed)	1–8	Coed	State	Tophouse	-	-	-	-	-	1914
Totara Bush Household School (closed 1945)	1–8	Coed	State	Wakefield	-	-	-	-	-	-
Upper Moutere School	1–8	Coed	State	Upper Moutere	8	423	100		3229	1857
Wai-iti School (closed 1938, formerly Upper Wakefield School)	1–8	Coed	State	Wai-iti	-	-	-	-	-	1857
Waimea College	9–13	Coed	State	Richmond	8	447	1,526		296	1957
Waimea Intermediate	7–8	Coed	State	Richmond	8	451	550		3233	1959
Waimea West School (closed 1938)	1–8	Coed	State	Brightwater	-	-	-	-	-	1846, 1858
Wairoa Gorge School (closed 1945)	1–8	Coed	State	Wairoa Valley	-	-	-	-	-	1920
Wairoa Valley School (closed 1909, also known as Garden Valley School or The Valley School)	1–8	Coed	State	Wairoa Valley	-	-	-	-	-	1891
Wakefield School	1–6	Coed	State	Wakefield	8	440	260		3234	1843
Wangapeka School (closed 1938)	1–8	Coed	State	Tapawera	-	-	-	-	-	1890
Woodstock School (closed 1942)	1–8	Coed	State	Woodstock	-	-	-	-	-	1882
Tui School (closed 1942)	1–8	Coed	State	Tapawera	-	-	-	-	-	1912
