= Brooklyn, Tasman District =

Brooklyn
- Interactive map of Brooklyn
- Coordinates: 41°05′46″S 172°58′23″E
- Country: New Zealand
- Territorial authority: Tasman
- Ward: Motueka Ward
- Community: Motueka Community
- Electorates: West Coast-Tasman; Te Tai Tonga (Māori)

Government
  - Territorial Authority: Tasman District Council
  - Mayor of Tasman: Tim King
  - West Coast-Tasman MP: Maureen Pugh
  - Te Tai Tonga MP: Tākuta Ferris

Area
  - Total: 2.68 km^{2} (1.03 sq mi)

Population (2023 census)
  - Total: 270
  - Density: 100/km^{2} (260/sq mi)
- Time zone: UTC+12 (NZST)
  - Summer (DST): UTC+13 (NZDT)

Brooklyn is a settlement and rural valley in the Tasman District of New Zealand's upper South Island. It is located on the outskirts of Motueka, and is dominated by orchards.

The Brooklyn Recreation Reserve, a flat, 4.6 ha grassed reserve, was donated to Tasman District Council in 1984. It includes remnants of lowland forest the council has deemed "significant", including a hillside of tawhai rauriki or black beech and regenerating native forest dominated by kānuka. The reserve has had limited weeds and no outbreak of wild pigs.

Brooklyn is connected to Woodstock by a cycling trail. In 2018, Tourism Minister Kelvin Davis announced funding to upgrade the trail.

The Blue Gum corner of Motueka River, just outside the village, is a river swimming spot.

== History ==
The valley road was partially closed due to flooding in July 2013.

Homes and buildings in the valley were severely damaged by floodwaters during Cyclone Gita in February 2018. Several people had to flee or be rescued from their flooded homes, and the road was left only accessible by 4WD vehicles.

In 2020, the National Institute of Water and Atmospheric Research monitored air quality in Brooklyn on behalf of Tasman District Council. It found quality regularly exceeded World Health Organization guidelines due to home fireplaces.

== Demographics ==
Brooklyn covers 2.68 km^{2} (1.03 sq mi). It is part of the larger Tākaka Hills statistical area.

Historical population
Year	Pop.	±% p.a.
2006	300	—
2013	252	−2.46%
2018	258	+0.47%
2023	270	+0.91%

Brooklyn had a population of 270 in the 2023 New Zealand census, an increase of 12 people (4.7%) since the 2018 census, and an increase of 18 people (7.1%) since the 2013 census. There were 144 males and 126 females in 99 dwellings. 1.1% of people identified as LGBTIQ+. There were 48 people (17.8%) aged under 15 years, 39 (14.4%) aged 15 to 29, 135 (50.0%) aged 30 to 64, and 45 (16.7%) aged 65 or older.

People could identify as more than one ethnicity. The results were 85.6% European (Pākehā), 16.7% Māori, 2.2% Pasifika, 1.1% Asian, and 4.4% other, which includes people giving their ethnicity as "New Zealander". English was spoken by 98.9%, Māori by 3.3%, and other languages by 8.9%. No language could be spoken by 1.1% (e.g. too young to talk). New Zealand Sign Language was known by 1.1%. The percentage of people born overseas was 18.9, compared with 28.8% nationally.

Religious affiliations were 16.7% Christian, 1.1% Māori religious beliefs, 1.1% Buddhist, and 1.1% other religions. People who answered that they had no religion were 73.3%, and 5.6% of people did not answer the census question.

Of those at least 15 years old, 36 (16.2%) people had a bachelor's or higher degree, 135 (60.8%) had a post-high school certificate or diploma, and 54 (24.3%) people exclusively held high school qualifications. 12 people (5.4%) earned over $100,000 compared to 12.1% nationally. The employment status of those at least 15 was 102 (45.9%) full-time, 39 (17.6%) part-time, and 3 (1.4%) unemployed.

== Education ==
Brooklyn School is a co-educational state primary school for Year 1 to 8 students, with a roll of 139 as of July 2026. It opened in 1874. The school received an additional $76,230 property funding in December 2019.
