= Little Pokororo River =

River in New Zealand

- Route of the Little Pokororo River
- Mouth of the Little Pokororo River Little Pokororo River (South Island)

Location
- Country: New Zealand

Physical characteristics
- Source
  - coordinates: 41°09′48″S 172°49′16″E
- Mouth
  - location: Motueka River
  - coordinates: 41°11′56″S 172°51′59″E

Basin features
- Progression: Little Pokororo River → Motueka River → Tasman Bay → Tasman Sea

The Little Pokororo River is a river of the Tasman Region of New Zealand's South Island. Like its neighbour the Pokororo River it is a tributary of the Motueka River, which it meets 15 kilometres southwest of Motueka.

== See also ==
- List of rivers of New Zealand
