= State Highway 61 (New Zealand) =

Road in New Zealand

State Highway 61

Route information
- Maintained by Tasman District Council
- Length: 58 km (36 mi)

Major junctions
- North end: SH 60 at Motueka
- South end: SH 6 at Kohatu Junction

Location
- Country: New Zealand
- Primary destinations: Tapawera

Highway system
- New Zealand state highways; Motorways and expressways; List
← SH 60	→ SH 62

State Highway 61 (SH 61) is a former New Zealand state highway in the Tasman Region of the South Island. It links the coastal town of Motueka with SH 6, the main route to the South Island's West Coast. Along with several other state highways, its status was revoked at the beginning of the 1990s. The route is now usually referred to as the Motueka Valley Highway.

== Route description ==
SH 61 provided (and still provides, without its former status) a short-cut route for vehicles travelling between the Golden Bay and western Tasman Bay / Te Tai-o-Aorere areas and the town of Westport, New Zealand and other parts of the West Coast and Buller.

The former SH 61 largely follows the valley of the Motueka River. Starting just to the south of central Motueka, the route is initially due west along College Street, passing along the southern edge of Motueka Aerodrome. After about three kilometres, the highway reaches the Motueka River, and turns upstream, to the southwest. It passes through the small settlements of Ngātīmoti and Woodstock, winding through a steep-sided valley before briefly leaving the river's edge. It rejoins the river after a further 5 km after passing through the small settlement of Stanley Brook. Shortly after rejoining the river, it passes through the township of Tapawera before reaching SH 6 at Kohatu Junction, close to the point where the Motueka River is joined by its tributary, the Motupiko River. Several of the small settlements along the highway's course are old gold mining towns from the 1860s Nelson Gold Rush, the first strike of which was at Waiwhero, just northeast of Ngātīmoti.

== See also ==
- List of New Zealand state highways
