= Rainy River (Tasman) =

Coordinates: 41°36′52″S 172°47′31″E

Location
- Country: New Zealand

Physical characteristics
- Source
  - elevation: 900 metres (3,000 ft)
- Mouth
  - location: Motupiko River
  - elevation: 330 metres (1,080 ft)
- Length: 19 km (12 mi)

The Rainy River is a river of the southern Tasman Region of New Zealand's South Island. It flows north from its sources 2 kilometres (1.2 mi) north of Saint Arnaud, reaching the Motupiko River 6 kilometres (3.7 mi) east of the Hope Saddle. The Motupiko River is a tributary of the Motueka River.
