= Moutere Inn =

New Zealand pub

Coordinates: 41.267491°S 173.006818°E

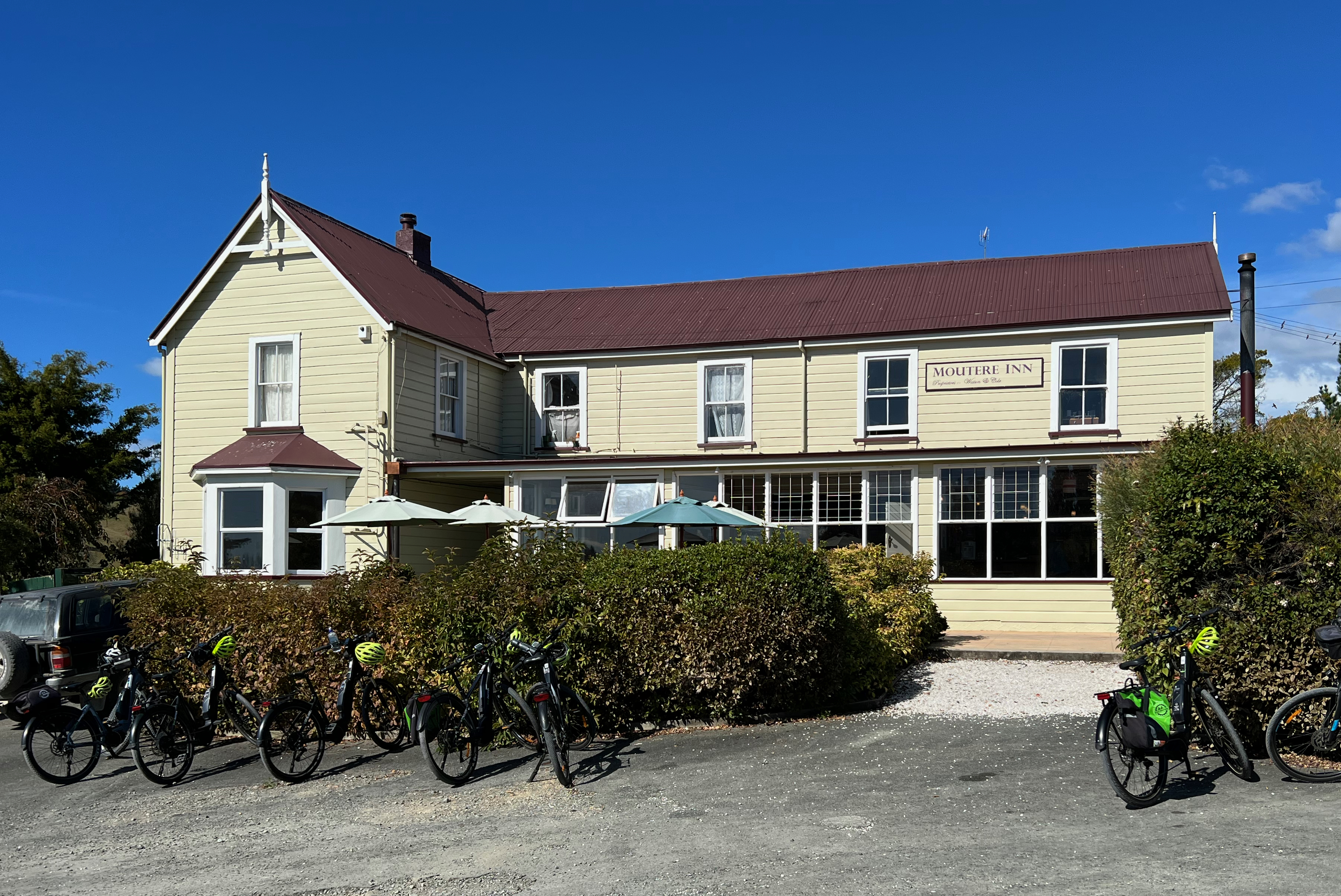
The Moutere Inn in 2022

The Moutere Inn is located in Upper Moutere in the Tasman District of New Zealand. It is New Zealand's oldest pub to remain operating in its original building. While there are a couple of older licenses still operating, none of them are operating from either their original location or building.

The Moutere Inn was established in 1850 by Cordt Bensemann, a German soldier and immigrant. The building has remained largely the same apart from the original verandah being lost when the main bar was extended in the 1960s.

The Inn now specialises in a continually changing range of craft beers, real ales and wines from around the Moutere area.
