= Tadmor River =

River in the Tasman District, New Zealand

- Route of the Tadmor River
- Mouth of the Tadmor River Tadmor River (South Island)

Location
- Country: New Zealand

Physical characteristics
- Source
  - location: Hope Range
  - coordinates: 41.55068°S 172.66133°E
- Mouth
  - location: Motueka River
  - coordinates: 41°22′22″S 172°44′07″E
- Length: 28 km (17 mi)

Basin features
- Progression: Tadmor River → Motueka River → Tasman Bay → Tasman Sea
- Tributaries
  - left: Gorge Creek, Ellis Creek, Kiwi Creek, Gay Creek
  - right: Kiwi Creek, Cat Creek, Donald Creek, Kākāriki Creek, Surprise Gully Stream, Kinzett Creek,

The Tadmor River is a river of the Tasman Region of New Zealand's South Island. It flows generally north from its sources in the Hope Range to reach the Motueka River three kilometres northwest of Tapawera.

== See also ==
- List of rivers of New Zealand
