= Matthew Arnold (disambiguation) =

Matthew Arnold (1822–1888) was an English poet and cultural critic.

Matthew Arnold may also refer to:

== Other people ==
- Matt Arnold (journalist) (born 1961), British television reporter
- Matthew Arnold (director) (born 1974), American film and TV director
- Matt Arnold (baseball) (born 1980), American baseball executive
- Matthew Arnold (cricketer) (born 1988), South African cricketer
- Matt Arnold (designer) (1976–2026), New Zealand graphic designer and blogger

== Schools ==
- Matthew Arnold School, Oxford, a secondary coeducational school and sixth form in Oxford.
- Matthew Arnold School, Staines-upon-Thames, a secondary coeducational school in Staines upon Thames, Surrey.

== See also ==
- Arnold Mathew (1852–1919), first Old Catholic bishop in the UK
- Sir Matthew Arnold Bracy Smith (1879–1959), English painter
- Matthew Arnold Thiessen (born 1980), Canadian-American musician
- Wieambilla shootings, a 2022 shooting incident in Australia, in which a police officer named Matthew Arnold was killed.
