= Motupiko River =

Coordinates: 41°27′S 172°50′E

Location
- Country: New Zealand

Physical characteristics
- Mouth
  - location: Motueka River
- Length: 31 km (19 mi)

The Motupiko River is a river of the Tasman Region of New Zealand's South Island. A major tributary of the Motueka River, it flows north from its origins southeast of the Hope Saddle, meeting the Motueka at Kohatu Junction, 15 kilometres west of Wakefield. The Motupiko's tributaries include the Rainy River.

== See also ==
- List of rivers of New Zealand
