= Pokororo River =

River in New Zealand

- Route of the Pokororo River
- Mouth of the Pokororo River Pokororo River (South Island)

Location
- Country: New Zealand

Physical characteristics
- Source
  - location: Wharepapa / Arthur Range
  - coordinates: 41°07′53″S 172°49′00″E
- Mouth
  - location: Motueka River
  - coordinates: 41°11′56″S 172°52′07″E
- Length: 12 kilometres (7.5 mi)

Basin features
- Progression: Pokororo River → Motueka River → Tasman Bay → Tasman Sea

The Pokororo River is a river of the Tasman Region of New Zealand's South Island. It flows southeast from the Wharepapa / Arthur Range to reach the Motueka River 15 kilometres southwest of the town of Motueka.

== See also ==
- List of rivers of New Zealand
