= Tapawera =

Settlement in Tasman District, New Zealand

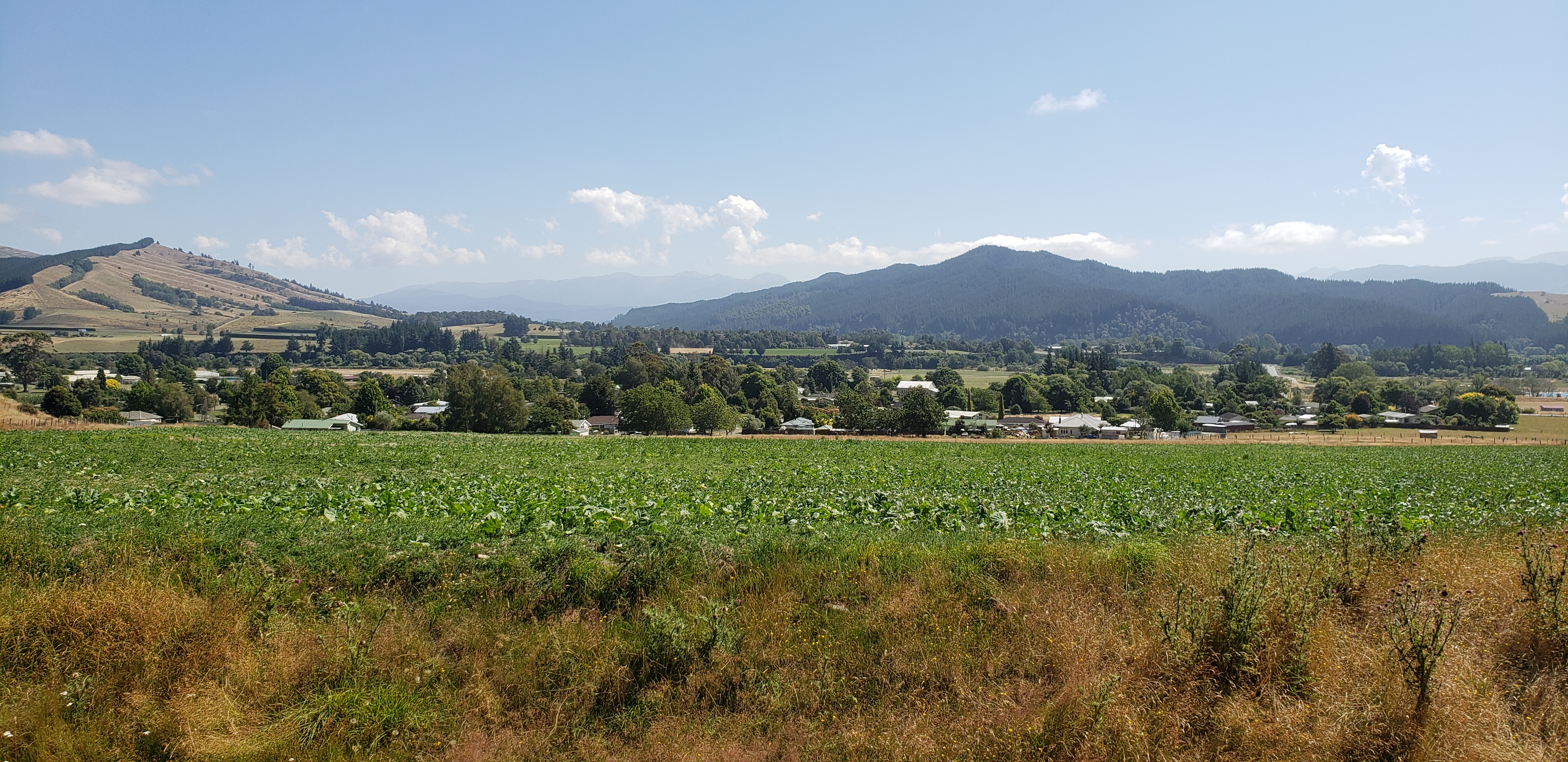
- Tapawera township from Shedwood Bush Conservation Area
- Nickname: Tap
- Interactive map of Tapawera
- Coordinates: 41.385°S 172.824°E
- Country: New Zealand
- Territorial authority: Tasman
- Ward: Lakes-Murchison Ward
- Electorates: West Coast-Tasman; Te Tai Tonga (Māori)

Government
  - Territorial Authority: Tasman District Council
  - Mayor of Tasman: Tim King
  - West Coast-Tasman MP: Maureen Pugh
  - Te Tai Tonga MP: Tākuta Ferris

Area
  - Total: 6.14 km^{2} (2.37 sq mi)
- Elevation: 142 m (466 ft)

Population (June 2025)
  - Total: 350
  - Density: 57/km^{2} (150/sq mi)
- Postcode(s): 7096
- Area code: 03

Tapawera is a small township in the Tasman District of New Zealand's South Island. It is located 76 km (47 miles) southwest of Nelson and 48 km (30 miles) southeast of Motueka. It is situated on the Motueka Valley Highway (formerly SH 61) by the banks of the Motueka River.

== History ==
Tapawera began its life when the Nelson Section railway edged down the Motueka Valley at the opening of the 20th century. Before the railway construction in the area the Ferry Inn at the ford crossing of the Motueka River was the only building in the vicinity.

The railway construction camp was situated there for several years and was named Maniaroa after a nearby farming property.

As the railway advanced down the valley growth came with it. A butchery and bakery were followed by a grocery store, and in 1902 the Upper Motueka Valley School was relocated to Maniaroa using a traction engine. The name Tapawera came with the opening of a Post Office in 1905 and the railway station in 1906.

Tapawera was soon acting as a centre for the surrounding area, supplanting Upper Motueka Valley as the largest settlement beyond Spooners. Upper Motueka Valley lost not only its pre-eminence but its name when it was renamed Mararewa after the station.

== Economy ==
Generally agriculture has surrounded Tapawera but berry growing has been notable up the Tadmor Valley.

Hop growing has been a feature of the Rakau area towards Tadmor for about a century. In recent years hops have boomed across the Tapawera district, so as well as the farms on the Tadmor Valley Road, there are hop farms along the Motueka Valley Highway between the township and Kohatu, and also from the township heading towards Motueka, at Battery Hill, up the Tapawera-Baton Road and beyond, and near Motupiko.

== Demographics ==
=== Tapawera ===
Tapawera is described by Statistics New Zealand as a rural settlement. It covers 6.14 km^{2} (2.37 sq mi) and had an estimated population of 350 as of June 2025, with a population density of 57 people per km^{2}. It is part of the larger Golden Downs statistical area.

Historical population for Tapawera
Year	Pop.	±% p.a.
2006	324	—
2013	315	−0.40%
2018	333	+1.12%
2023	345	+0.71%

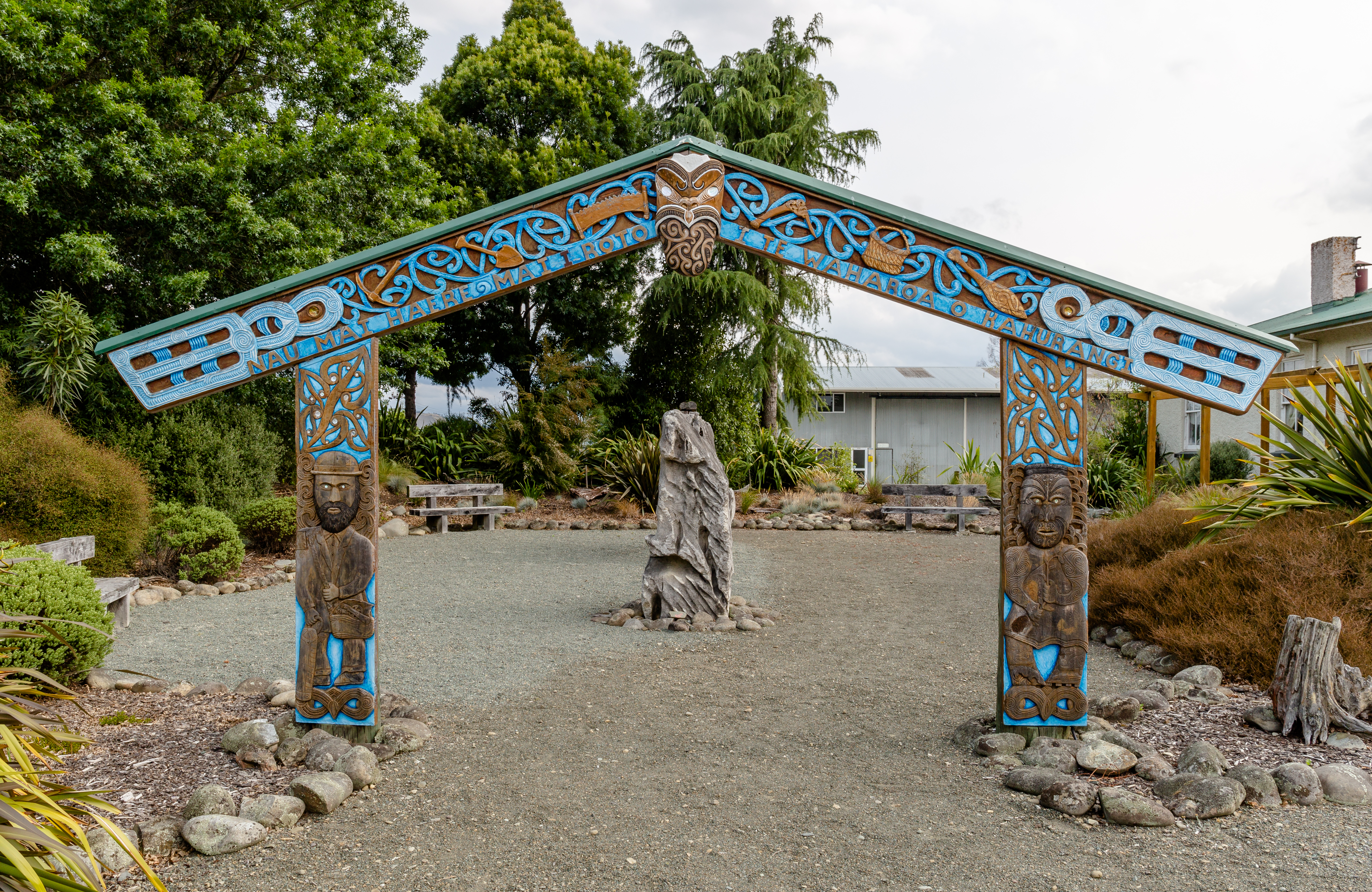
"Gateway of Kahurangi" at the Tapawera Community Centre

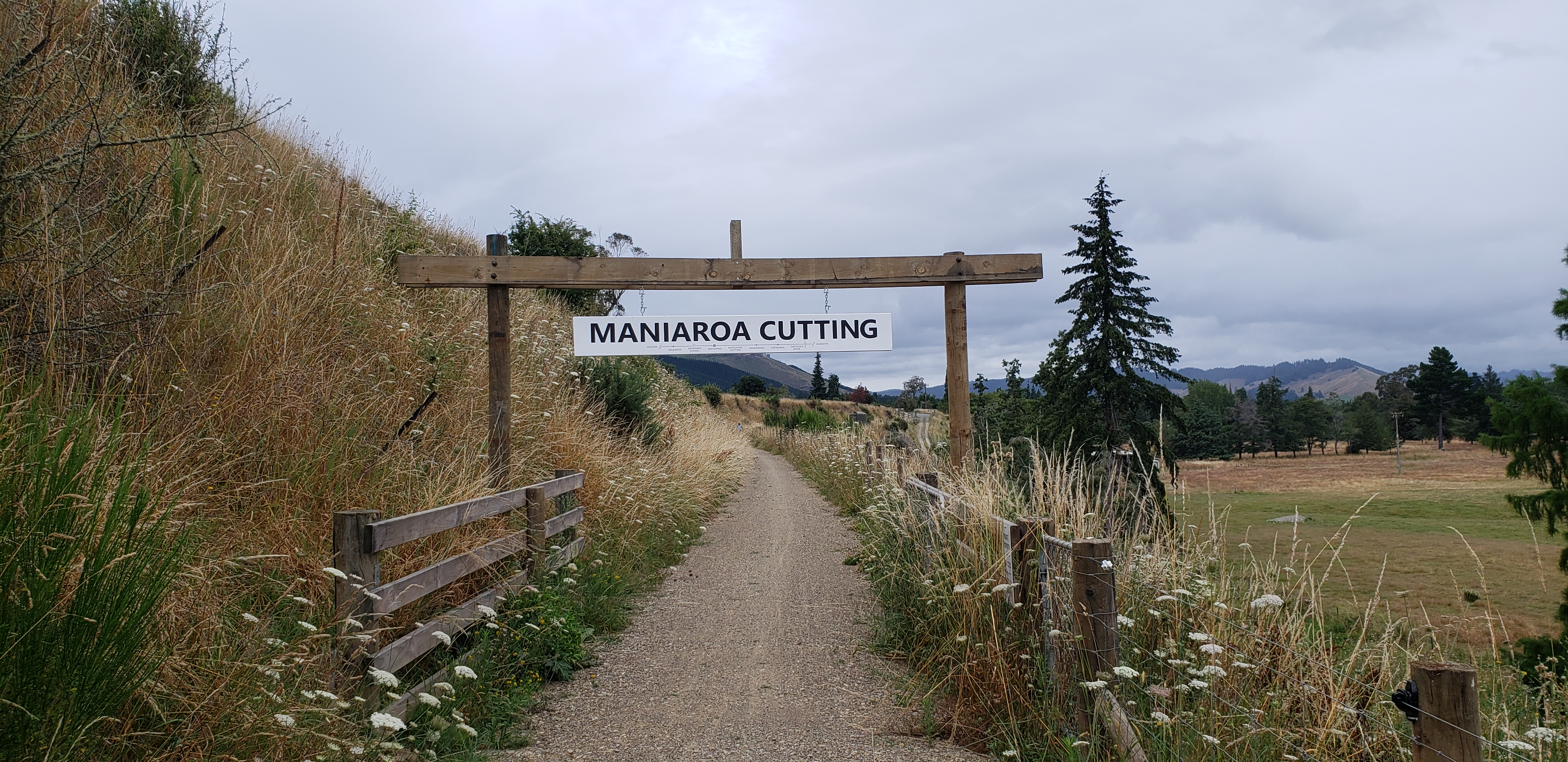
Maniaroa Cutting on the cycle trail between Kohatu and Tapawera. Maniaroa was the original name of Tapawera.

Tapawera had a population of 345 in the 2023 New Zealand census, an increase of 12 people (3.6%) since the 2018 census, and an increase of 30 people (9.5%) since the 2013 census. There were 180 males, 159 females, and 3 people of other genders in 129 dwellings. 1.7% of people identified as LGBTIQ+. The median age was 39.2 years (compared with 38.1 years nationally). There were 60 people (17.4%) aged under 15 years, 57 (16.5%) aged 15 to 29, 171 (49.6%) aged 30 to 64, and 54 (15.7%) aged 65 or older.

People could identify as more than one ethnicity. The results were 91.3% European (Pākehā); 18.3% Māori; 0.9% Pasifika; 0.9% Asian; 0.9% Middle Eastern, Latin American and African New Zealanders (MELAA); and 5.2% other, which includes people giving their ethnicity as "New Zealander". English was spoken by 95.7%, Māori by 3.5%, and other languages by 4.3%. No language could be spoken by 3.5% (e.g. too young to talk). The percentage of people born overseas was 11.3, compared with 28.8% nationally.

Religious affiliations were 15.7% Christian, 0.9% Māori religious beliefs, 2.6% New Age, and 1.7% other religions. People who answered that they had no religion were 73.0%, and 6.1% of people did not answer the census question.

Of those at least 15 years old, 24 (8.4%) people had a bachelor's or higher degree, 159 (55.8%) had a post-high school certificate or diploma, and 102 (35.8%) people exclusively held high school qualifications. The median income was $30,000, compared with $41,500 nationally. 12 people (4.2%) earned over $100,000 compared to 12.1% nationally. The employment status of those at least 15 was 135 (47.4%) full-time, 51 (17.9%) part-time, and 9 (3.2%) unemployed.

=== Golden Downs statistical area ===
Golden Downs covers 1,819.60 km^{2} (702.55 sq mi) and had an estimated population of 1,960 as of June 2025, with a population density of 1.1 people per km^{2}.

Historical population for Golden Downs
Year	Pop.	±% p.a.
2006	1,740	—
2013	1,710	−0.25%
2018	1,827	+1.33%
2023	1,920	+1.00%

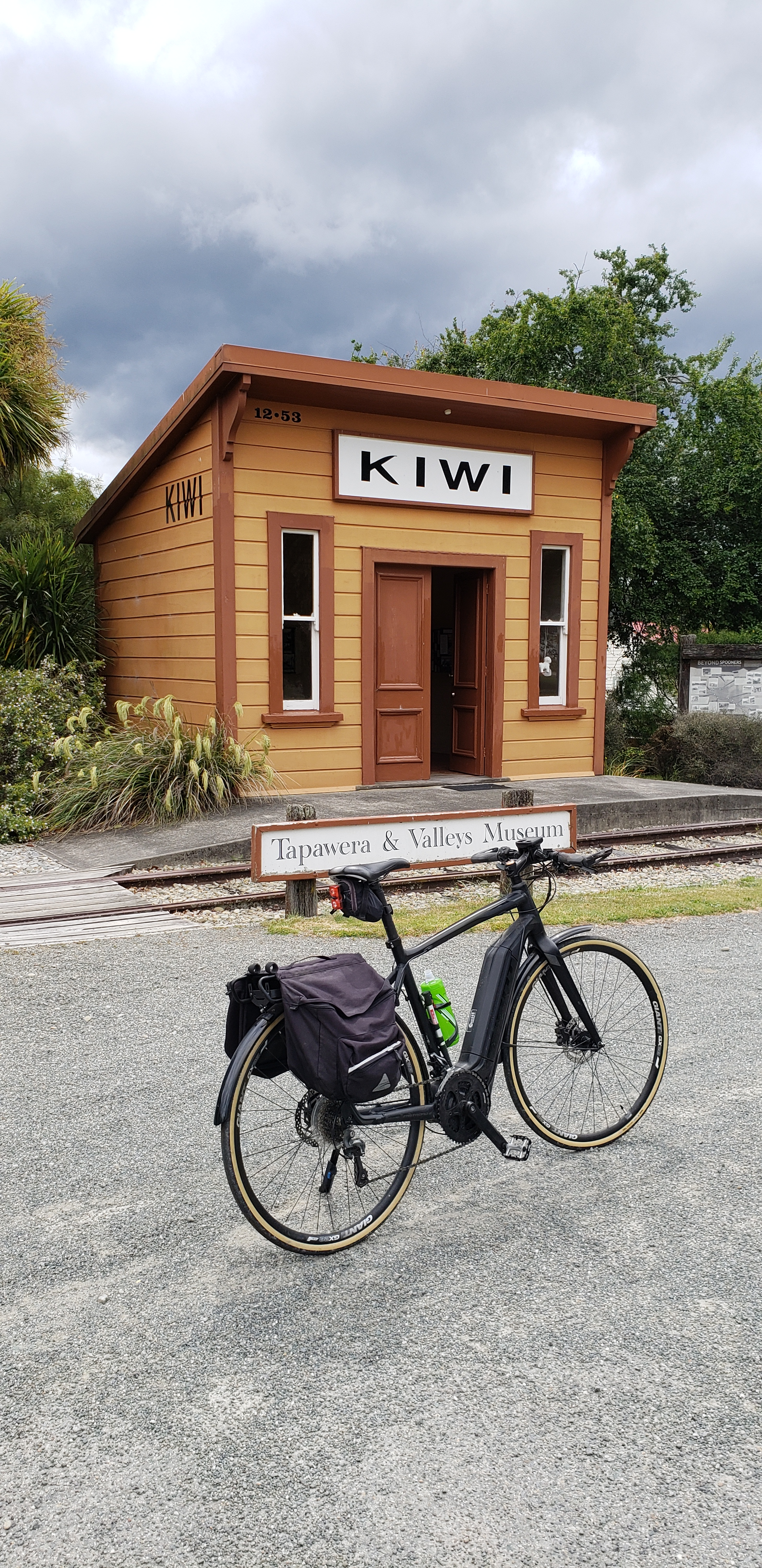
The Tapawera and Valleys Museum housed in what was the Kiwi railway station. The building is only half of the original Kiwi station. Ingenious railwaymen cut it in two and moved half to Tadmor to replace its station which burned down in 1952.

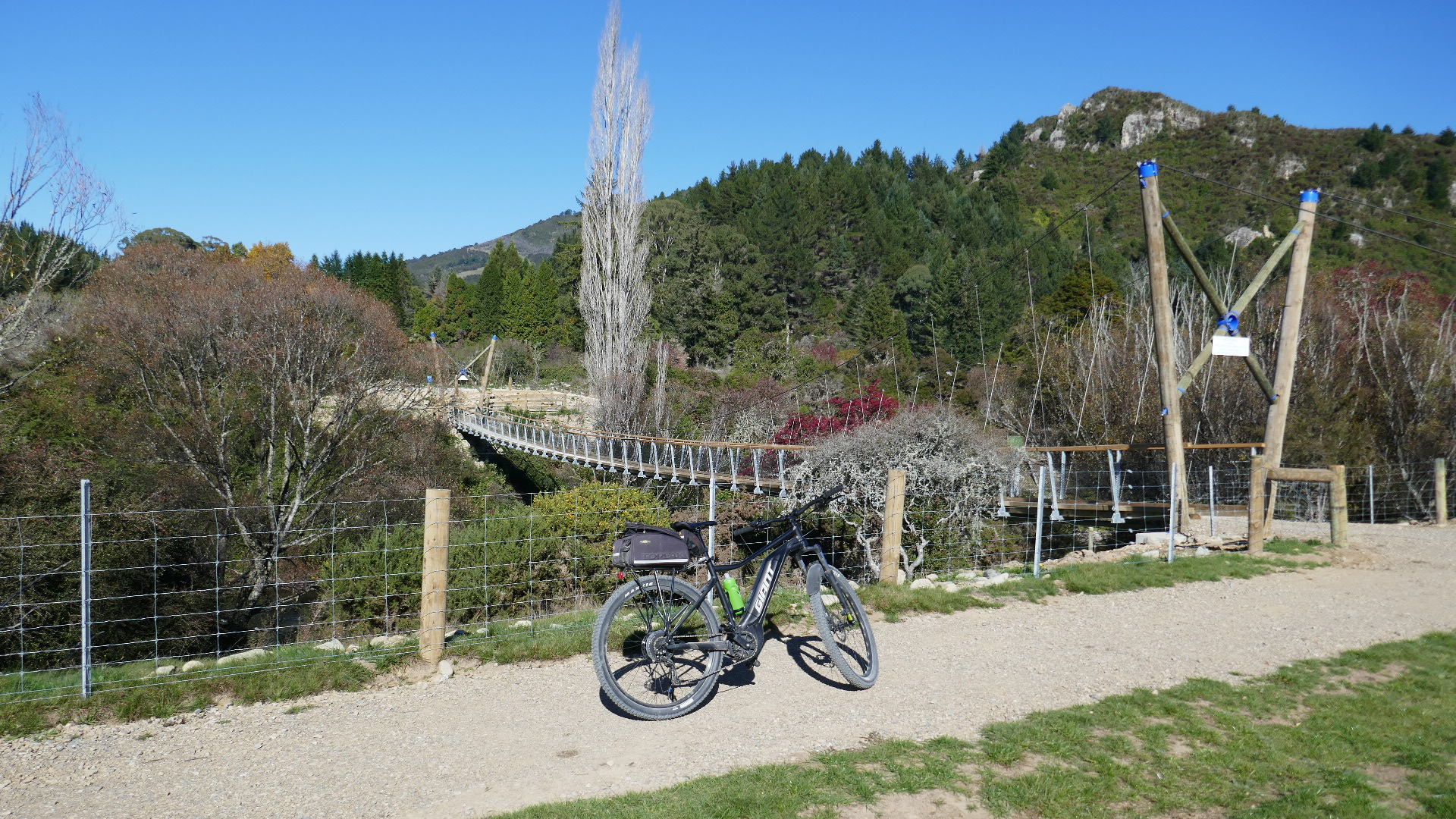
The swingbridge over the Baton River opened in April 2022.

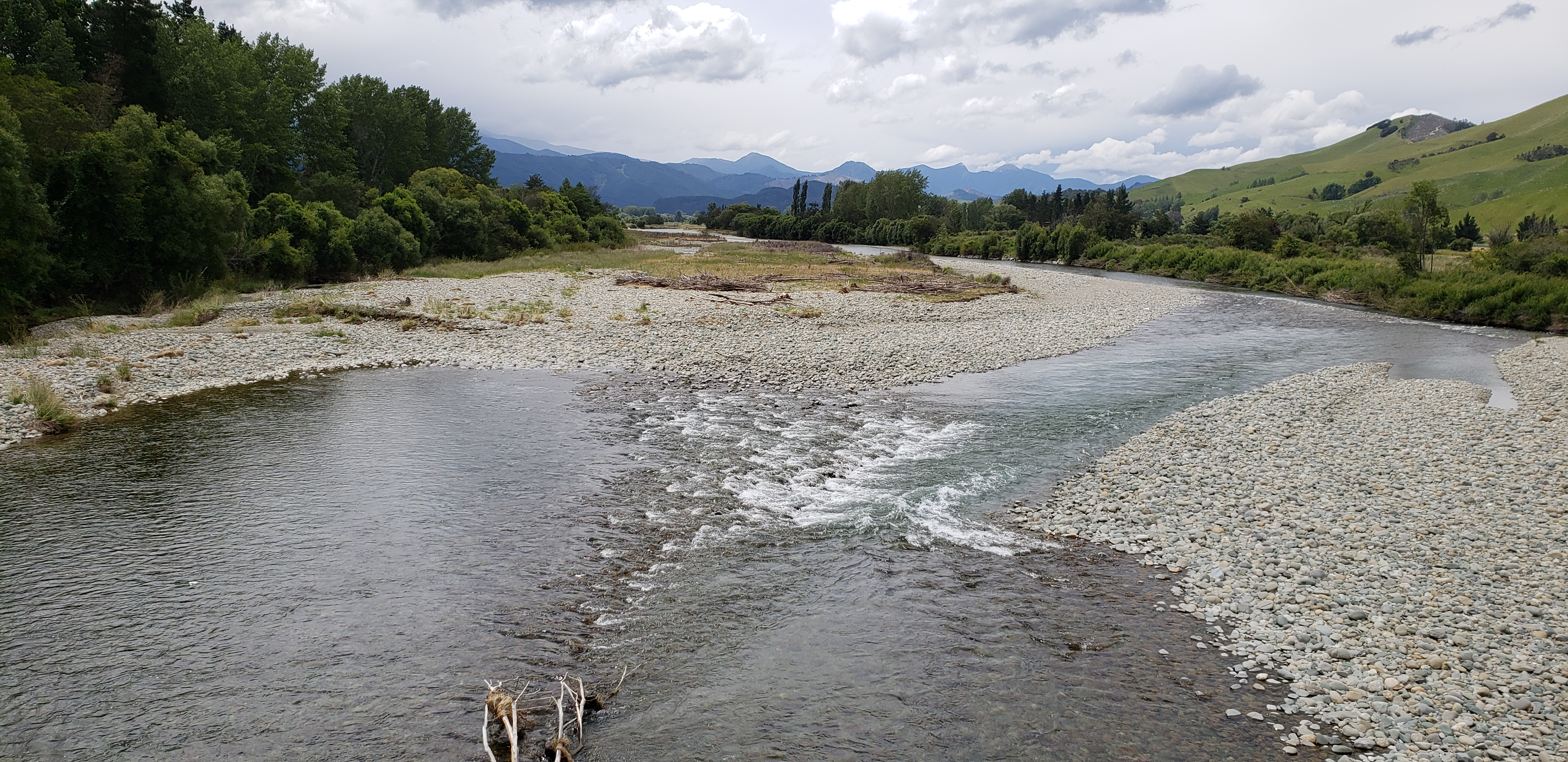
Motueka River from the Tadmor Valley Road Bridge at Tapawera.

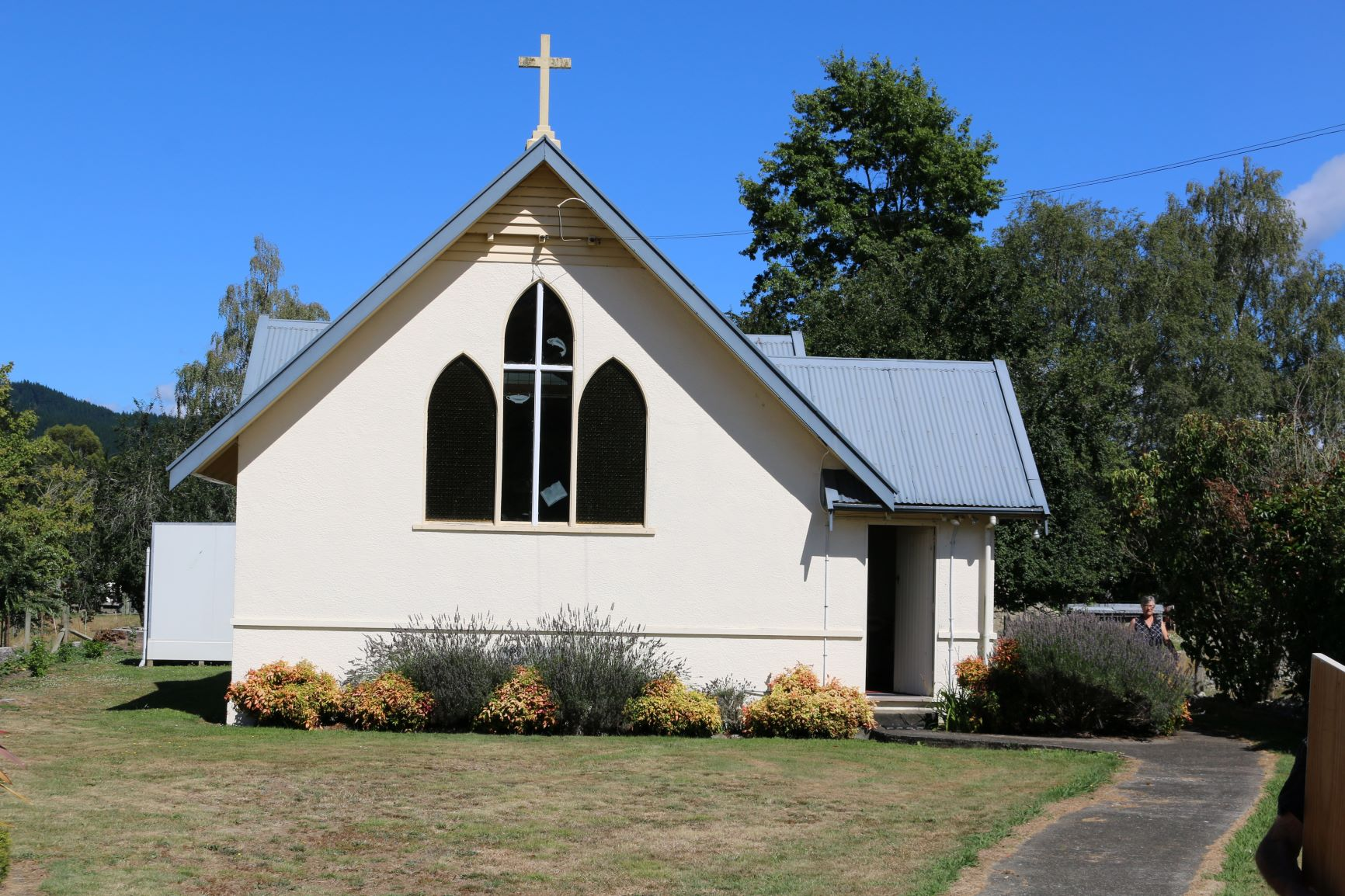
St Peters Church, Tapawera (2021)

Golden Downs had a population of 1,920 in the 2023 New Zealand census, an increase of 93 people (5.1%) since the 2018 census, and an increase of 210 people (12.3%) since the 2013 census. There were 1,017 males, 900 females, and 6 people of other genders in 699 dwellings. 2.0% of people identified as LGBTIQ+. The median age was 45.0 years (compared with 38.1 years nationally). There were 330 people (17.2%) aged under 15 years, 306 (15.9%) aged 15 to 29, 954 (49.7%) aged 30 to 64, and 333 (17.3%) aged 65 or older.

People could identify as more than one ethnicity. The results were 92.8% European (Pākehā); 14.4% Māori; 0.6% Pasifika; 1.4% Asian; 1.1% Middle Eastern, Latin American and African New Zealanders (MELAA); and 3.8% other, which includes people giving their ethnicity as "New Zealander". English was spoken by 97.7%, Māori by 2.3%, and other languages by 5.3%. No language could be spoken by 2.2% (e.g. too young to talk). New Zealand Sign Language was known by 0.3%. The percentage of people born overseas was 14.5, compared with 28.8% nationally.

Religious affiliations were 20.5% Christian, 0.3% Māori religious beliefs, 0.3% Buddhist, 1.1% New Age, and 1.2% other religions. People who answered that they had no religion were 66.6%, and 10.0% of people did not answer the census question.

Of those at least 15 years old, 225 (14.2%) people had a bachelor's or higher degree, 945 (59.4%) had a post-high school certificate or diploma, and 423 (26.6%) people exclusively held high school qualifications. The median income was $33,700, compared with $41,500 nationally. 87 people (5.5%) earned over $100,000 compared to 12.1% nationally. The employment status of those at least 15 was 885 (55.7%) full-time, 261 (16.4%) part-time, and 30 (1.9%) unemployed.

== Amenities ==
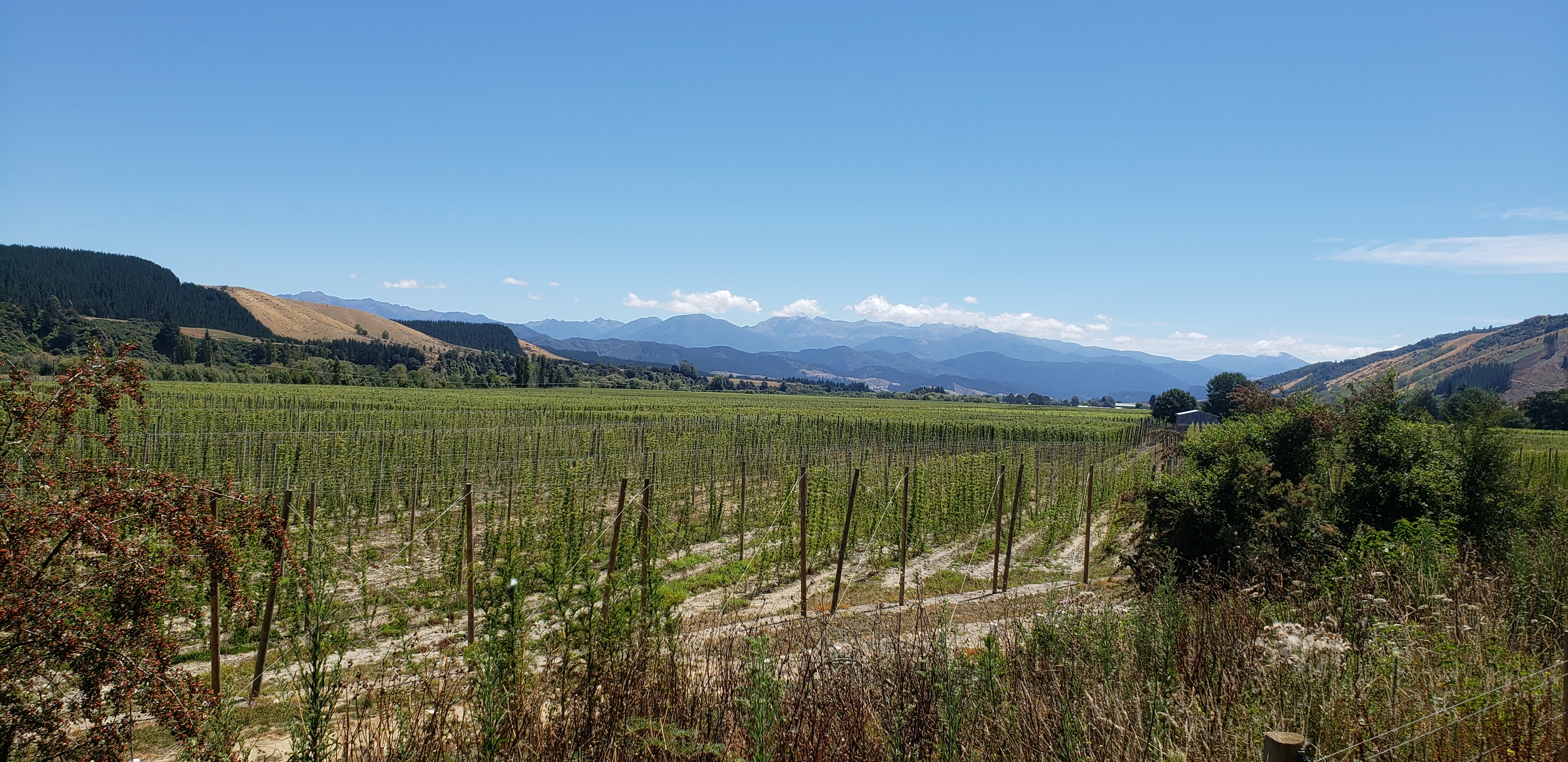
Hop farm near Tapawera.

Tapawera's facilities include a school, a Four Square supermarket, a hotel (bar and restaurant with limited hours) with accommodation, a cafe (closed as at Dec 2025), a campground, a petrol station, a fitness centre (closed as at Dec 2025) and a vehicle workshop. As at December 2025 a coffee cart operates outside the community centre (closed due to its earthquake-prone rating) as does a food cart.

== Attractions ==
Tapawera is a gateway to the Kahurangi National Park. There are several shorter tracks accessible from Tapawera but the main attraction in this corner of the park is the Wangapeka Track which crosses to the West Coast south of Karamea. Access to the track is via the Tadmor-Bushend Road and on to the Wangapeka valley. At the junction of the Wangapeka and Dart rivers there is a concrete ford (which needs care) over the Dart River. After seven kilometres there is the Siberia Flat campsite and the Wangapeka Track starts 1 km further on, at the Rolling River carpark.

Shedwood Bush Conservation Area: This area of native bush along the eastern edge of the village offers walks and a scenic lookout.

The Hidden Sculpture Garden is 5 km from town towards Kohatu.

== Cycle Tourism ==
Tapawera is part of two cycle trails.

Tasman's Great Taste Trail passes through Tapawera district. The trail starts in Nelson and takes cyclists to Richmond, Brightwater, Wakefield, and through the 1.4 km-long Spooners Tunnel to Kohatu. The Great Taste Trail was heavily impacted by two extreme weather events in mid-2025 but by the end of the year 95% of the trail was open. The two sections still to be restored are between Wakefield and Spooners Tunnel. (Diversions are in place).

The trail from Kohatu to Tapawera is off-road except for one short section on road. From Tapawera cyclists can now journey on a picturesque route up Tapawera-Baton Road, which further up the valley follows the Wangapeka River. The gravel road then takes cyclists over a saddle to the Baton River. A swingbridge over the Baton was opened in April 2022. After crossing the river the trail follows the Baton Valley Road to the Baton Bridge at Woodstock. There is work still to be done on the next section but cyclists follow the Motueka West Bank Road to Riwaka.

The gravel road sections on this part of the trail call for caution, especially further up the Tapawera-Baton Road, as they can be busier than some people expect including with heavy vehicles. Dust is also an issue.

The township is also the starting point of the Tapawera to Murchison Heartland Ride which travels up the Tadmor Valley to Glenhope and then on to Murchison via Lake Rotoroa.

Tapawera is also on the route for the Tour Aotearoa brevet which is now held annually. This event travels the length of the country and in Tasman follows the Great Taste Trail to Tapawera and then the route of the Tapawera to Murchison Heartland ride.

== Climate ==
Climate data for Tapawera (1981–2010)
Month	Jan	Feb	Mar	Apr	May	Jun	Jul	Aug	Sep	Oct	Nov	Dec	Year
Mean daily maximum °C (°F)	23.6 (74.5)	24.4 (75.9)	21.9 (71.4)	18.5 (65.3)	15.4 (59.7)	12.2 (54.0)	11.9 (53.4)	13.6 (56.5)	15.6 (60.1)	17.8 (64.0)	19.9 (67.8)	21.6 (70.9)	18.0 (64.5)
Daily mean °C (°F)	17.0 (62.6)	17.3 (63.1)	15.3 (59.5)	11.8 (53.2)	9.0 (48.2)	6.1 (43.0)	5.7 (42.3)	7.3 (45.1)	9.5 (49.1)	11.6 (52.9)	13.5 (56.3)	15.6 (60.1)	11.6 (53.0)
Mean daily minimum °C (°F)	10.3 (50.5)	10.2 (50.4)	8.7 (47.7)	5.1 (41.2)	2.5 (36.5)	0.0 (32.0)	−0.6 (30.9)	0.9 (33.6)	3.4 (38.1)	5.5 (41.9)	7.1 (44.8)	9.7 (49.5)	5.2 (41.4)
Average rainfall mm (inches)	69.9 (2.75)	64.9 (2.56)	110.8 (4.36)	89.5 (3.52)	85.5 (3.37)	105.5 (4.15)	107.6 (4.24)	82.3 (3.24)	122.8 (4.83)	99.5 (3.92)	73.9 (2.91)	100.3 (3.95)	1,112.5 (43.8)
Source: NIWA

== Education ==
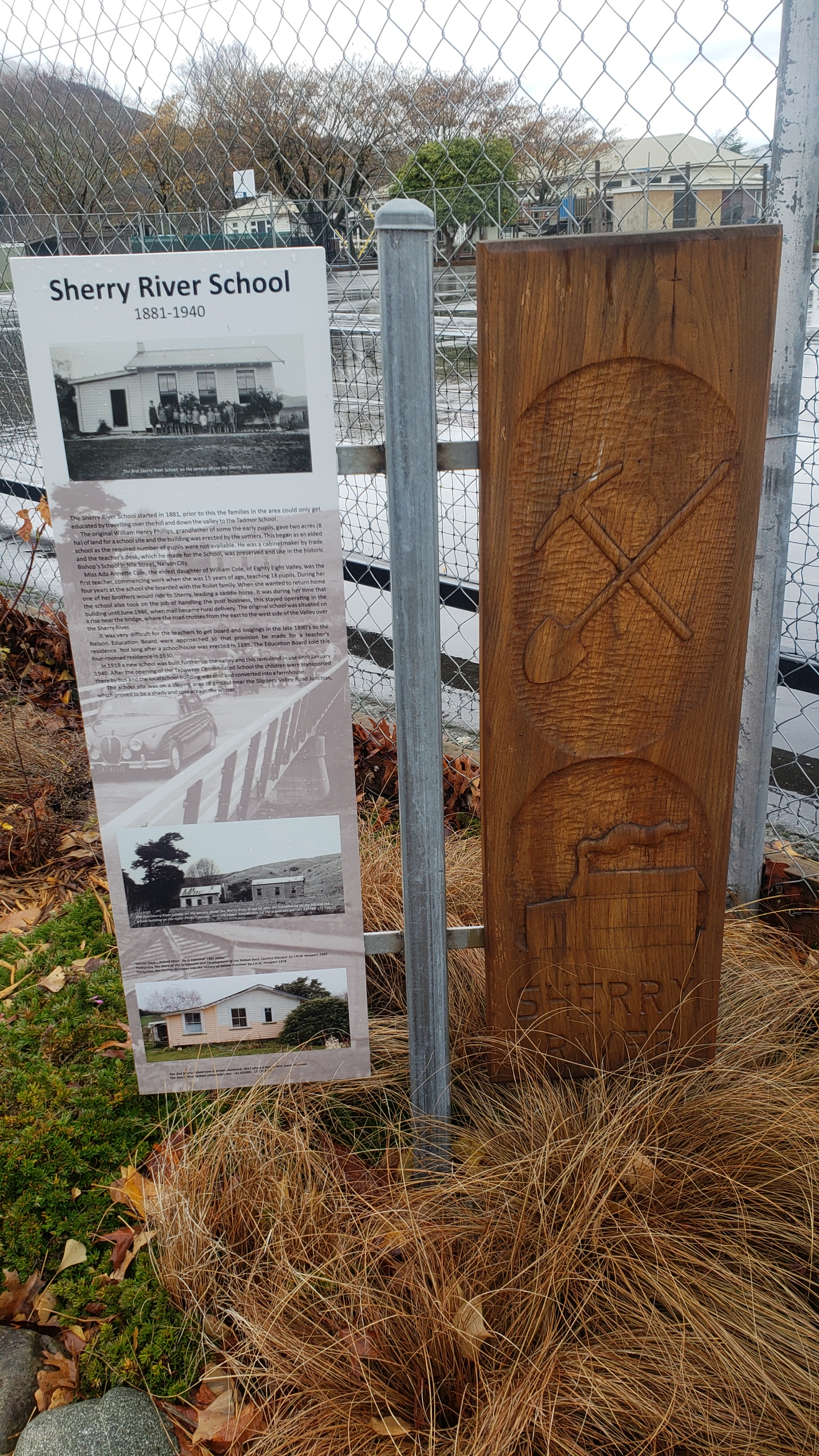
Example of history panel and carving at TAS.

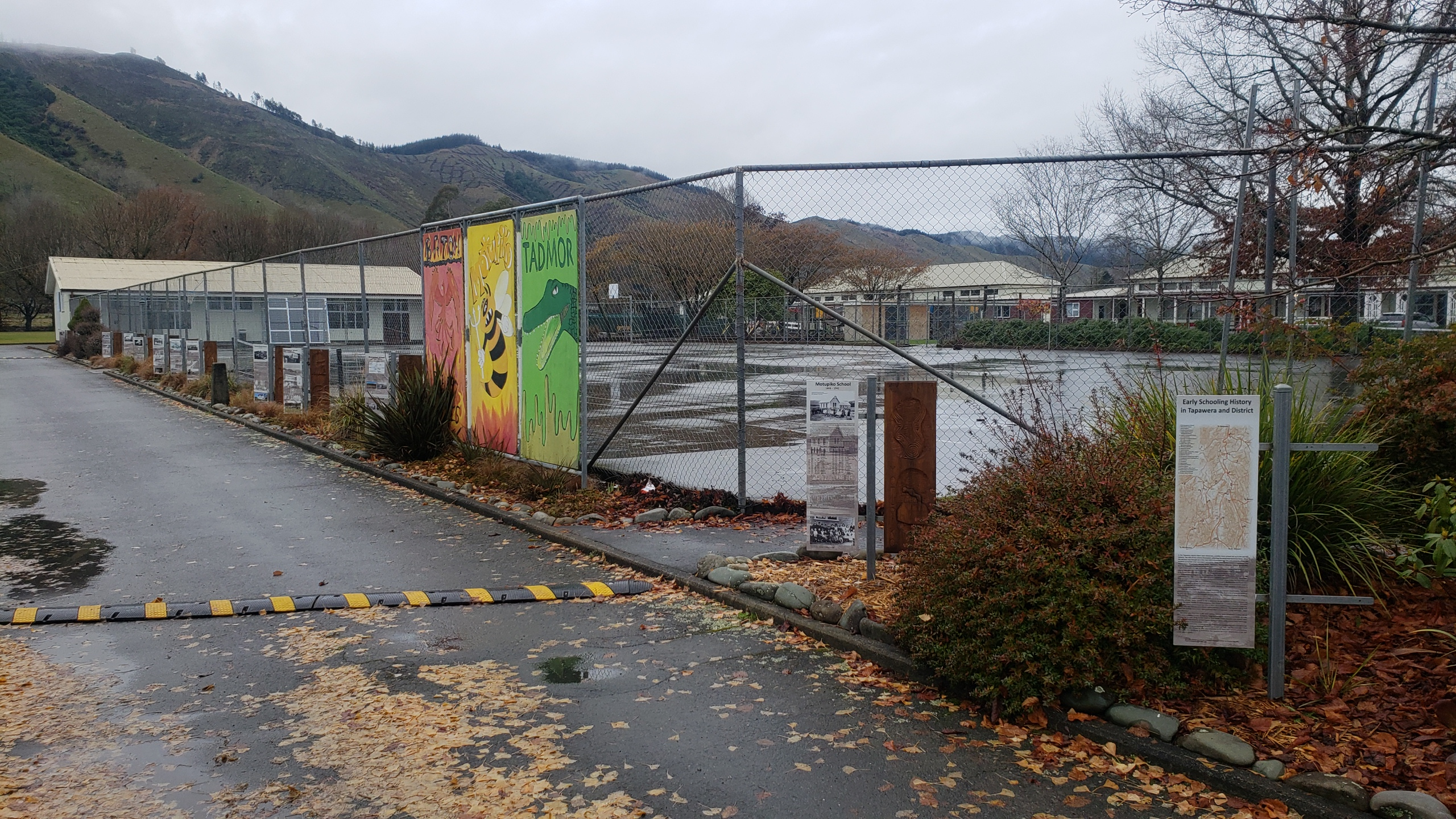
Education history display at Tapawera Area School.

Tapawera Area School is a co-educational state area school for Year 1 to 13 students. It has a roll of 147 as of July 2026.

Tapawera Consolidated High School (also called Tapawera District High School) opened in 1942 through the consolidation of nine local schools:

- Golden Downs School (opened 1904)
- Kiwi School (opened 1901, formerly Upper Tadmor School)
- Korere School (opened 1885, formerly Upper Motupiko School)
- Matariki School (opened 1907, formerly Wangapeka School until 1912)
- Motupiko School (opened 1868, rebuilt 1877)
- Sherry River School (opened 1881)
- Stanley Brook School (opened 1880)
- Tadmor School (opened 1878)
- Tapawera School (opened 1876, formerly Motueka Valley School 1876–1907)
- Wangapeka School (opened 1890, closed 1938)
- Tui School (opened 1912)

It was replaced by Tapawera Area School in 1975.

== St Peter's Church ==
St Peter's Community Church foundation stone was consecrated 8 May 1937 by Rev.WG Hilliard (fifth bishop of Nelson) and the new church was consecrated in 1938.

== Government ==
Tapawera is in the Lakes-Murchison Ward of the Tasman District Council. Mayor Tim King was re-elected in the 2025 local body elections and the ward councillor is John Gully.

Another channel to the district council is through the Tapawera & Districts Community Council, one of a number of community organisations throughout Tasman which support and advocate for residents in their local communities and make submissions to the TDC.

Tapawera is in the West Coast-Tasman electorate.
