= Mahana, New Zealand =

Mahana
- Interactive map of Mahana
- Coordinates: 41.266°S 173.046°E
- Country: New Zealand
- Territorial authority: Tasman
- Ward: Moutere-Waimea
- Community: Motueka Community
- Electorates: West Coast-Tasman; Te Tai Tonga (Māori)

Government
  - Territorial Authority: Tasman District Council
  - Mayor of Tasman: Tim King
  - West Coast-Tasman MP: Katie Milne
  - Te Tai Tonga MP: Mananui Ramsden

Area
  - Total: 17.94 km^{2} (6.93 sq mi)

Population (2023 census)
  - Total: 678
  - Density: 37.8/km^{2} (97.9/sq mi)
- Time zone: UTC+12 (NZST)
  - Summer (DST): UTC+13 (NZDT)

Mahana is a settlement in the Tasman District of New Zealand's upper South Island.

It is a small rural community in the Upper Moutere District, of mainly lifestyle block properties. equidistant from the two nearest townships of Richmond and Motueka, it has local shops, bars and restaurants in the village of Mapua 5min's away, and beach / boat access via the Mapua inlet, and Tramping, biking and fishing etc to the west in the stunning Arthur and Pikikiruna ranges.

The local economy is centred on Gravity Winery and its vineyards, alongside businesses offering campervan hire and sales, roof guttering services, and small-scale farming. The community is centred around the local primary school.

== Demographics ==
Mahana locality covers 17.94 km^{2} (6.93 sq mi). It is part of the larger Moutere Hills statistical area.

Historical population
Year	Pop.	±% p.a.
2006	438	—
2013	429	−0.30%
2018	504	+3.27%
2023	678	+6.11%
The 2006 population is for a larger area of 24.38 km^{2}. Source:

Mahana had a population of 678 in the 2023 New Zealand census, an increase of 174 people (34.5%) since the 2018 census, and an increase of 249 people (58.0%) since the 2013 census. There were 342 males, 330 females, and 3 people of other genders in 231 dwellings. 2.7% of people identified as LGBTIQ+. There were 120 people (17.7%) aged under 15 years, 81 (11.9%) aged 15 to 29, 348 (51.3%) aged 30 to 64, and 132 (19.5%) aged 65 or older.

People could identify as more than one ethnicity. The results were 96.0% European (Pākehā), 4.9% Māori, 0.4% Pasifika, 1.3% Asian, and 2.2% other, which includes people giving their ethnicity as "New Zealander". English was spoken by 97.8%, Māori by 0.4%, and other languages by 9.3%. No language could be spoken by 0.9% (e.g. too young to talk). New Zealand Sign Language was known by 0.9%. The percentage of people born overseas was 30.1, compared with 28.8% nationally.

Religious affiliations were 15.5% Christian, 0.4% Buddhist, 0.4% New Age, and 1.8% other religions. People who answered that they had no religion were 68.6%, and 12.8% of people did not answer the census question.

Of those at least 15 years old, 168 (30.1%) people had a bachelor's or higher degree, 297 (53.2%) had a post-high school certificate or diploma, and 87 (15.6%) people exclusively held high school qualifications. 81 people (14.5%) earned over $100,000 compared to 12.1% nationally. The employment status of those at least 15 was 309 (55.4%) full-time, 105 (18.8%) part-time, and 6 (1.1%) unemployed.

== Education ==
Mahana School is a co-educational state primary school for Year 1 to 8 students, with a roll of 53 as of July 2026. It opened in September 1915.
