= Lower Moutere =

Rural locality in Tasman, New Zealand

- Rural locality
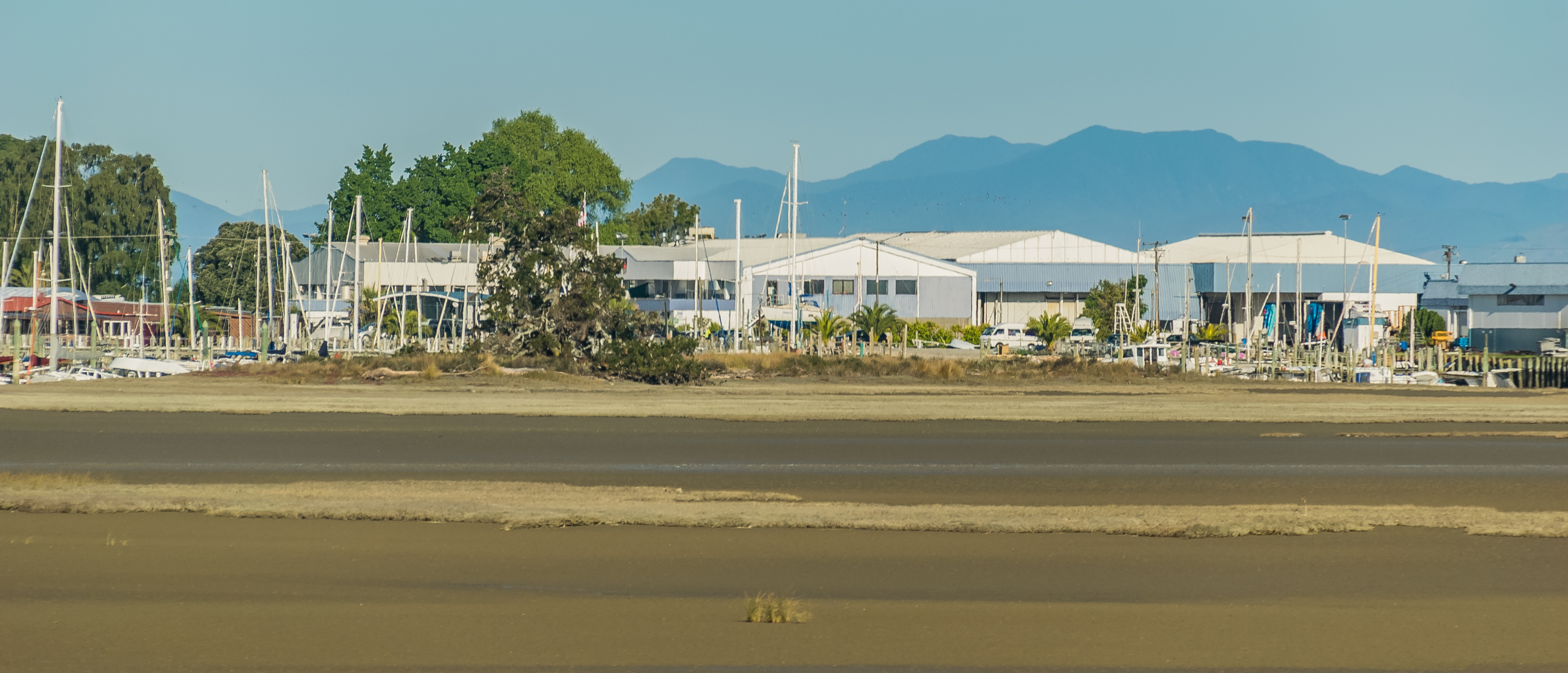
- Moutere Inlet
- Interactive map of Lower Moutere
- Coordinates: 41°09′09″S 172°59′37″E
- Country: New Zealand
- Territorial authority: Tasman
- Ward: Motueka Ward
- Community: Motueka Community
- Electorates: West Coast-Tasman; Te Tai Tonga (Māori)

Government
  - Territorial authority: Tasman District Council
  - Mayor of Tasman: Tim King
  - West Coast-Tasman MP: Katie Milne
  - Te Tai Tonga MP: Mananui Ramsden

Area
  - Total: 7.16 km^{2} (2.76 sq mi)

Population (2023 Census)
  - Total: 513
  - Density: 71.6/km^{2} (186/sq mi)
- Time zone: UTC+12 (NZST)
  - Summer (DST): UTC+13 (NZDT)
- Postcode: 7175

Lower Moutere is a settlement in the Tasman District of New Zealand's upper South Island. It is a farming community in the Lower Moutere valley, 6 km (3.7 mi) from Motueka close to the Moutere Inlet.

The road up the valley from Motueka to Upper Moutere is an alternative to the main State Highway 60 route between Nelson and Motueka.

The Riverside Community was established in Lower Moutere in 1941 by a small group of Methodist pacifists, and continues to operate a dairy farm and cafe. As of 2013 about 24 people were permanent members and 19 children lived there, but the community’s population sometimes doubled due to visitors, including WWOOFers (Willing Workers on Organic Farms).

The Lower Moutere Memorial Hall features a plaque commemorating the three local men who died and 35 local men who served overseas during World War II. A memorial gate commemorates those who died or served during World War I.

Moutere is the Māori word for 'island'.

Native birds are common in the area, and a kākā was found in the area in January 2020.

== Demographics ==
Lower Moutere village covers 7.16 km^{2} (2.76 sq mi) It is part of the larger Lower Moutere statistical area.

Historical population for Lower Moutere village
Year	Pop.	±% p.a.
2006	411	—
2013	441	+1.01%
2018	489	+2.09%
2023	513	+0.96%

The village had a population of 513 in the 2023 New Zealand census, an increase of 24 people (4.9%) since the 2018 census, and an increase of 72 people (16.3%) since the 2013 census. There were 276 males and 237 females in 165 dwellings. 3.5% of people identified as LGBTIQ+. There were 72 people (14.0%) aged under 15 years, 111 (21.6%) aged 15 to 29, 264 (51.5%) aged 30 to 64, and 69 (13.5%) aged 65 or older.

People could identify as more than one ethnicity. The results were 81.9% European (Pākehā); 12.3% Māori; 12.3% Pasifika; 3.5% Asian; 0.6% Middle Eastern, Latin American and African New Zealanders (MELAA); and 3.5% other, which includes people giving their ethnicity as "New Zealander". English was spoken by 96.5%, Māori by 2.9%, Samoan by 8.2%, and other languages by 12.9%. No language could be spoken by 0.6% (e.g. too young to talk). New Zealand Sign Language was known by 1.8%. The percentage of people born overseas was 28.1, compared with 28.8% nationally.

Religious affiliations were 33.9% Christian, 0.6% Buddhist, 0.6% New Age, and 0.6% other religions. People who answered that they had no religion were 56.7%, and 6.4% of people did not answer the census question.

Of those at least 15 years old, 42 (9.5%) people had a bachelor's or higher degree, 243 (55.1%) had a post-high school certificate or diploma, and 162 (36.7%) people exclusively held high school qualifications. 24 people (5.4%) earned over $100,000 compared to 12.1% nationally. The employment status of those at least 15 was 249 (56.5%) full-time, 66 (15.0%) part-time, and 12 (2.7%) unemployed.

=== Lower Moutere statistical area ===
Lower Moutere statistical area covers 62.11 km^{2} (23.98 sq mi). It had an estimated population of 1,890 as of June 2025, with a population density of 30.4 people per km^{2}.

Historical population for Lower Moutere statistical area
Year	Pop.	±% p.a.
2006	1,374	—
2013	1,509	+1.35%
2018	1,683	+2.21%
2023	1,845	+1.86%

Lower Moutere had a population of 1,845 in the 2023 New Zealand census, an increase of 162 people (9.6%) since the 2018 census, and an increase of 336 people (22.3%) since the 2013 census. There were 975 males, 870 females, and 3 people of other genders in 663 dwellings. 2.8% of people identified as LGBTIQ+. The median age was 44.2 years (compared with 38.1 years nationally). There were 288 people (15.6%) aged under 15 years, 309 (16.7%) aged 15 to 29, 927 (50.2%) aged 30 to 64, and 321 (17.4%) aged 65 or older.

People could identify as more than one ethnicity. The results were 85.5% European (Pākehā); 11.1% Māori; 7.2% Pasifika; 2.6% Asian; 1.3% Middle Eastern, Latin American and African New Zealanders (MELAA); and 3.4% other, which includes people giving their ethnicity as "New Zealander". English was spoken by 97.2%, Māori by 3.6%, Samoan by 3.7%, and other languages by 12.4%. No language could be spoken by 1.5% (e.g. too young to talk). New Zealand Sign Language was known by 0.8%. The percentage of people born overseas was 27.2, compared with 28.8% nationally.

Religious affiliations were 29.1% Christian, 0.3% Māori religious beliefs, 0.3% Buddhist, 0.5% New Age, and 0.8% other religions. People who answered that they had no religion were 62.6%, and 6.0% of people did not answer the census question.

Of those at least 15 years old, 291 (18.7%) people had a bachelor's or higher degree, 804 (51.6%) had a post-high school certificate or diploma, and 468 (30.1%) people exclusively held high school qualifications. The median income was $35,200, compared with $41,500 nationally. 123 people (7.9%) earned over $100,000 compared to 12.1% nationally. The employment status of those at least 15 was 789 (50.7%) full-time, 276 (17.7%) part-time, and 39 (2.5%) unemployed.

== Education ==
Lower Moutere School is a co-educational state primary school for Year 1 to 8 students, with a roll of 214 as of July 2026. The school opened in 1857. A fire destroyed four classrooms and other facilities in 1990.
