= Dovedale, New Zealand =

Settlement on South Island, New Zealand

Dovedale
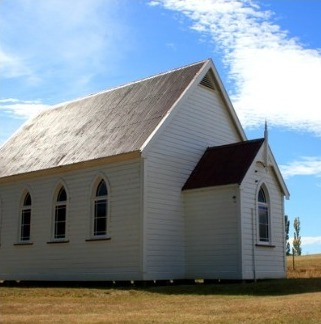
- Churchhill Church in Dovedale
- Interactive map of Dovedale
- Coordinates: 41.287°S 172.894°E
- Country: New Zealand
- Territorial authority: Tasman
- Ward: Moutere-Waimea
- Electorates: West Coast-Tasman; Te Tai Tonga (Māori)

Government
  - Territorial Authority: Tasman District Council
  - Mayor of Tasman: Tim King
  - West Coast-Tasman MP: Maureen Pugh
  - Te Tai Tonga MP: Tākuta Ferris

Area
  - Total: 68.39 km^{2} (26.41 sq mi)

Population (2023 census)
  - Total: 198
  - Density: 2.90/km^{2} (7.50/sq mi)
- Time zone: UTC+12 (NZST)
  - Summer (DST): UTC+13 (NZDT)

Dovedale is a settlement in the Tasman District of New Zealand's upper South Island.

== Demographics ==
Dovedale locality covers 68.39 km^{2} (26.41 sq mi). It is part of the larger Upper Moutere statistical area.

Historical population
Year	Pop.	±% p.a.
2006	186	—
2013	189	+0.23%
2018	207	+1.84%
2023	198	−0.89%

Dovedale had a population of 198 in the 2023 New Zealand census, a decrease of 9 people (−4.3%) since the 2018 census, and an increase of 9 people (4.8%) since the 2013 census. There were 96 males and 102 females in 72 dwellings. 1.5% of people identified as LGBTIQ+. The median age was 47.4 years (compared with 38.1 years nationally). There were 33 people (16.7%) aged under 15 years, 24 (12.1%) aged 15 to 29, 105 (53.0%) aged 30 to 64, and 33 (16.7%) aged 65 or older.

People could identify as more than one ethnicity. The results were 93.9% European (Pākehā), 6.1% Māori, 1.5% Pasifika, 3.0% Asian, and 3.0% other, which includes people giving their ethnicity as "New Zealander". English was spoken by 97.0%, Māori by 1.5%, and other languages by 7.6%. No language could be spoken by 1.5% (e.g. too young to talk). The percentage of people born overseas was 16.7, compared with 28.8% nationally.

Religious affiliations were 19.7% Christian, and 1.5% other religions. People who answered that they had no religion were 60.6%, and 16.7% of people did not answer the census question.

Of those at least 15 years old, 33 (20.0%) people had a bachelor's or higher degree, 105 (63.6%) had a post-high school certificate or diploma, and 27 (16.4%) people exclusively held high school qualifications. The median income was $38,300, compared with $41,500 nationally. 12 people (7.3%) earned over $100,000 compared to 12.1% nationally. The employment status of those at least 15 was 90 (54.5%) full-time and 24 (14.5%) part-time.

== Education ==
Dovedale School is a co-educational state primary school for Year 1 to 8 students, with a roll of 21 as of July 2026. The first school in Dovedale opened in 1869. It was replaced by the current school in 1938.
