= Ngātīmoti =

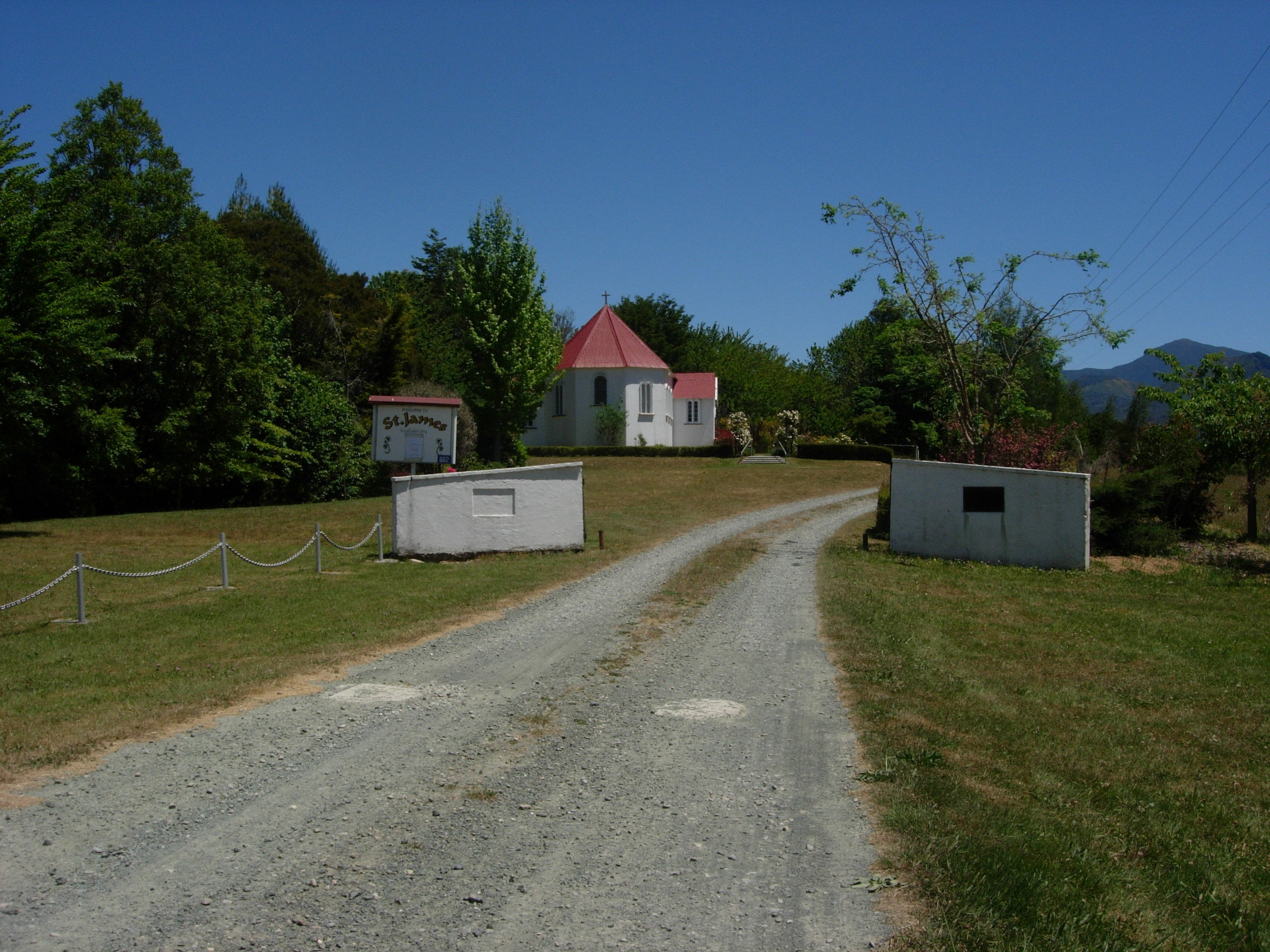
- St James Anglican Church, November 2007
- Interactive map of Ngātīmoti
- Coordinates: 41°13′S 172°54′E
- Country: New Zealand
- District: Tasman
- Ward: Moutere-Waimea
- Electorates: West Coast-Tasman; Te Tai Tonga (Māori)

Government
  - Territorial Authority: Tasman District Council
  - Mayor of Tasman: Tim King
  - West Coast-Tasman MP: Maureen Pugh
  - Te Tai Tonga MP: Tākuta Ferris

Area
  - Total: 28.33 km^{2} (10.94 sq mi)

Population (2023 census)
  - Total: 321
  - Density: 11.3/km^{2} (29.3/sq mi)
- Time zone: UTC+12 (NZST)
  - Summer (DST): UTC+13 (NZDT)
- Area code: 03

Ngātīmoti or Ngatimoti is a town near Motueka in New Zealand's South Island.

The town lies on the banks of the Motueka River and has been inhabited since 1855 when the Salisbury brothers arrived in the river valley. The local economy includes forestry, apple orchards and sheep and dairy farming. It is connected to the town of Motueka by the Motueka Valley Highway (formerly State Highway 61).

== History ==
The name for this community originated after a Māori boy with the Christian baptismal name Timothy (Tīmoti) carved his name into a tree at the corner of what is now Ngatimoti school.

On 1 January 1863 the town featured the first formal gathering of the Brethren religious movement, at the house of a local settler, James George Deck and by the 1900 census the movement had nearly 2% of the total NZ population. This created a tension between Brethren and Anglican settlers in the valley. The Anglicans sent troops to World War I, while the Brethren adopted a semi-pacifist stance. The first New Zealander to die in the conflict was from Ngātīmoti. An ongoing characteristic of the community is the peaceful coexistence and respect for a wide variety of lifestyles and viewpoints, including conservative farmers, hippies and communes. The town experienced major floods in 1877, 1990 and 2025 contributed to by extensive deforestation of the steep surrounding region.

In 2019, the name of the locality was officially gazetted as Ngātīmoti.

== Demographics ==
Ngātīmoti locality covers 28.33 km^{2} (10.94 sq mi). It is part of the larger Upper Moutere statistical area.

Historical population
Year	Pop.	±% p.a.
2006	267	—
2013	330	+3.07%
2018	324	−0.37%
2023	321	−0.19%

Ngātīmoti had a population of 321 in the 2023 New Zealand census, a decrease of 3 people (−0.9%) since the 2018 census, and a decrease of 9 people (−2.7%) since the 2013 census. There were 165 males and 156 females in 135 dwellings. 1.9% of people identified as LGBTIQ+. There were 33 people (10.3%) aged under 15 years, 54 (16.8%) aged 15 to 29, 159 (49.5%) aged 30 to 64, and 72 (22.4%) aged 65 or older.

People could identify as more than one ethnicity. The results were 90.7% European (Pākehā), 9.3% Māori, 5.6% Pasifika, 0.9% Asian, and 3.7% other, which includes people giving their ethnicity as "New Zealander". English was spoken by 98.1%, Māori by 2.8%, and other languages by 15.0%. New Zealand Sign Language was known by 0.9%. The percentage of people born overseas was 29.0, compared with 28.8% nationally.

Religious affiliations were 21.5% Christian, 0.9% Hindu, 0.9% Islam, and 0.9% other religions. People who answered that they had no religion were 66.4%, and 9.3% of people did not answer the census question.

Of those at least 15 years old, 60 (20.8%) people had a bachelor's or higher degree, 144 (50.0%) had a post-high school certificate or diploma, and 96 (33.3%) people exclusively held high school qualifications. 15 people (5.2%) earned over $100,000 compared to 12.1% nationally. The employment status of those at least 15 was 126 (43.8%) full-time, 54 (18.8%) part-time, and 3 (1.0%) unemployed.

== Education ==
Ngatimoti School is a co-educational state primary school for Year 1 to 8 students, with a roll of 69 as of July 2026. The school opened on 17 August 1868. Pokororo School (opened 1883) merged into Ngatimoti School in 1938. Orinoco School (opened 1894) closed in 1956 with its students moving to Ngatimoti School.

== St James Church ==
St James is an Anglican church which was erected in 1884. The building is constructed of tōtara and rimu.

== Notable residents ==
- Noel Edmonds
