= Woodstock, Tasman =

Woodstock
- Interactive map of Woodstock
- Coordinates: 41.261°S 172.806°E
- Country: New Zealand
- Territorial authority: Tasman
- Ward: Moutere-Waimea
- Electorates: West Coast-Tasman; Te Tai Tonga (Māori)

Government
  - Territorial Authority: Tasman District Council
  - Mayor of Tasman: Tim King
  - West Coast-Tasman MP: Maureen Pugh
  - Te Tai Tonga MP: Tākuta Ferris

Area
  - Total: 23.13 km^{2} (8.93 sq mi)

Population (2023 census)
  - Total: 159
  - Density: 6.87/km^{2} (17.8/sq mi)
- Time zone: UTC+12 (NZST)
  - Summer (DST): UTC+13 (NZDT)

Woodstock is a small settlement in the Tasman District of the northern South Island of New Zealand. It is located on the Motueka Valley Highway, close to the eastern bank of the Motueka River, some 20 kilometres southwest of Motueka, at the junction of the Motueka River and its small tributary, the Dove River.

== Demographics ==
Woodstock locality covers 25.13 km^{2} (9.70 sq mi). It is part of the larger Upper Moutere statistical area.

Historical population
Year	Pop.	±% p.a.
2006	135	—
2013	141	+0.62%
2018	159	+2.43%
2023	159	+0.00%

Woodstock had a population of 159 in the 2023 New Zealand census, unchanged since the 2018 census, and an increase of 18 people (12.8%) since the 2013 census. There were 84 males and 75 females in 60 dwellings. 1.9% of people identified as LGBTIQ+. The median age was 47.6 years (compared with 38.1 years nationally). There were 36 people (22.6%) aged under 15 years, 9 (5.7%) aged 15 to 29, 81 (50.9%) aged 30 to 64, and 33 (20.8%) aged 65 or older.

People could identify as more than one ethnicity. The results were 96.2% European (Pākehā), 7.5% Māori, 1.9% Pasifika, and 3.8% other, which includes people giving their ethnicity as "New Zealander". English was spoken by 94.3%, Māori by 1.9%, and other languages by 9.4%. No language could be spoken by 3.8% (e.g. too young to talk). The percentage of people born overseas was 20.8, compared with 28.8% nationally.

Religious affiliations were 18.9% Christian, 7.5% Hindu, and 1.9% other religions. People who answered that they had no religion were 71.7%, and 1.9% of people did not answer the census question.

Of those at least 15 years old, 27 (22.0%) people had a bachelor's or higher degree, 69 (56.1%) had a post-high school certificate or diploma, and 30 (24.4%) people exclusively held high school qualifications. The median income was $28,600, compared with $41,500 nationally. 6 people (4.9%) earned over $100,000 compared to 12.1% nationally. The employment status of those at least 15 was 45 (36.6%) full-time, 24 (19.5%) part-time, and 3 (2.4%) unemployed.

== Education ==
Woodstock School opened in 1882 and closed in about 1908 because there were not enough students. It reopened on a new site in 1922. In 1942 or 1943 it merged to Tapawera School.
