= Matt Arnold (designer) =

New Zealand designer (1976–2026)

- Born: Matthew Thomas de Lauret Arnold; 6 January 1976; Australia
- Died: 10 April 2026 (aged 50); Lower Moutere, New Zealand
- Occupation: Graphic designer
- Spouse: Kate Arnold
- Children: 1

Matthew Thomas de Lauret Arnold (6 January 1976 – 10 April 2026) was a New Zealand graphic designer and blogger.

== Early life and family ==
Arnold was born on 6 January 1976 and grew up in Sydney, Australia. He met his wife, Kate, a veterinarian from New Zealand, while living in Melbourne. The couple moved to Christchurch in 2006, and they had a son in about 2010.

== Design career ==
Arnold co-founded the Lyttelton design studio Sons & Co. in 2008, with business partner Tim Kelleher. The studio won awards for their work, including for the design of the Christchurch Art Gallery website in 2010. Arnold was also passionate about local architecture; he ran the Christchurch Modern blog which catalogued Christchurch Style architecture. In 2020 he published the book I never met a straight line I didn't like about the Christchurch Style with co-author Mary Gaudin.

== Death ==
Arnold was hit and killed by a car at Lower Moutere while cycling in the Tasman District on 10 April 2026; he was 50 years old. A number of notable designers and institutions expressed their condolences, including Toi Manahau Designers Institute.
