= Tasman (settlement) =

Settlement in Tasman District, New Zealand

- Rural settlement
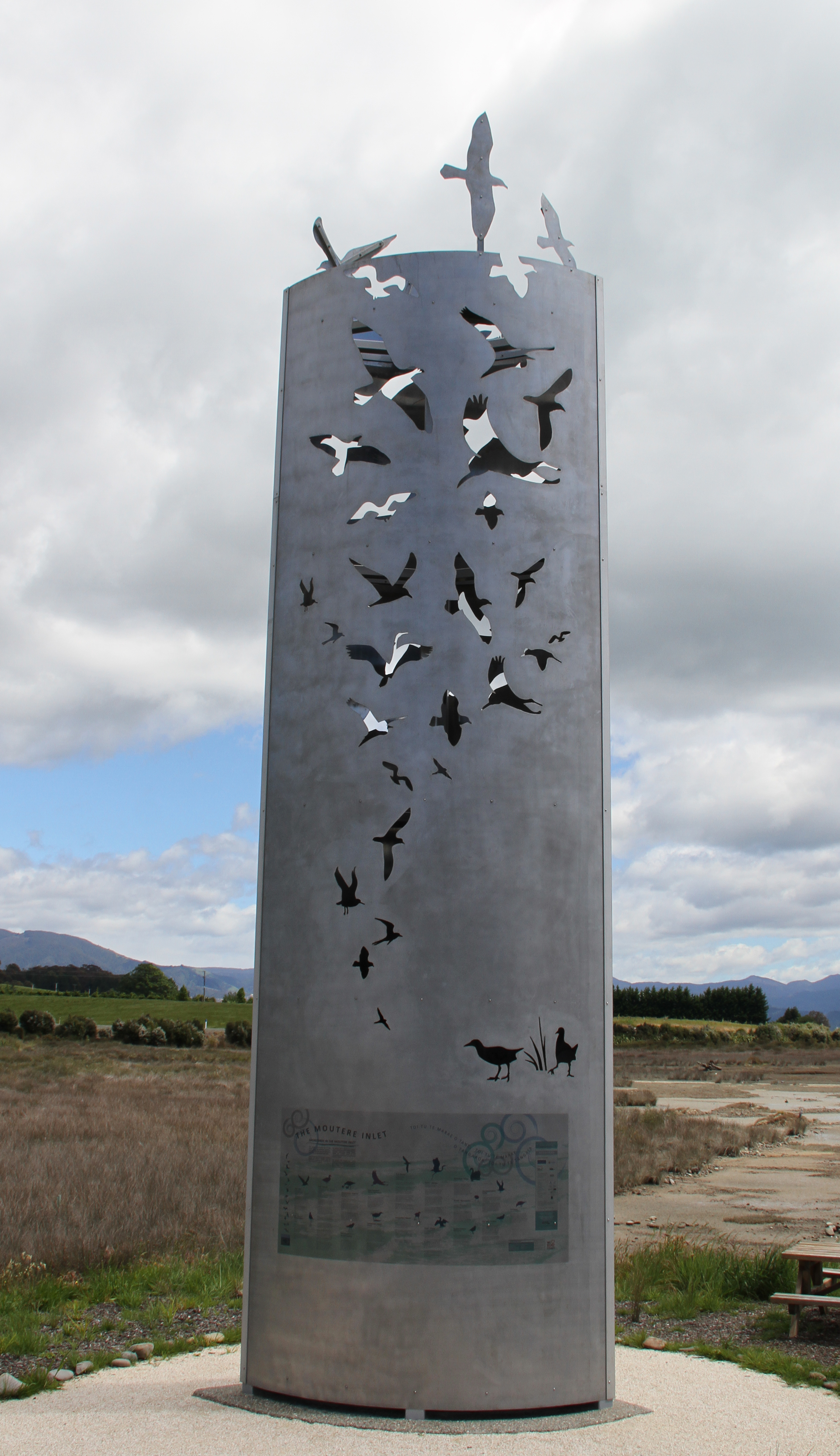
- Aporo Sculpture
- Interactive map of Tasman
- Coordinates: 41.191°S 173.052°E
- Country: New Zealand
- Territorial authority: Tasman
- Ward: Moutere-Waimea Ward
- Named for: Abel Tasman
- Electorates: West Coast-Tasman; Te Tai Tonga (Māori)

Government
  - Territorial Authority: Tasman District Council
  - Mayor of Tasman: Tim King
  - West Coast-Tasman MP: Katie Milne
  - Te Tai Tonga MP: Mananui Ramsden

Area
  - Total: 7.48 km^{2} (2.89 sq mi)

Population (June 2025)
  - Total: 700
  - Density: 94/km^{2} (240/sq mi)
- Postcode(s): 7173
- Area code: 03

Tasman is a settlement in the Tasman District of New Zealand's upper South Island. It is located between Māpua and Motueka, 45 kilometres (28 mi) from Abel Tasman National Park and 40 kilometres (25 mi) from Nelson.

The Tasman area covers a small peninsula on the southern and eastern side of the Moutere Inlet. It includes Kina Beach, a Tasman Bay / Te Tai-o-Aorere beach with rock pools which is only fully accessible during low tide.

The population of Tasman Village and Kina Beach is approximately 400. There is a general store, a medieval cafe, a vineyard, and a nine-hole golf course with views of Mt Arthur and Abel Tasman National Park. The area also has a cycling track, and is also a base from kayaking, fishing and hiking.

The Aporo Sculpture, a 9 metres (30 ft) high stainless steel sculpture, sits at the Tasman Village turnoff from State Highway 60. It was unveiled in October 2015, cost $60,000, and took local artists, community groups, Tasman District Council staff and volunteers six years to complete.

Country singer-songwriter Aly Cook and four-time adventure racing world champion Nathan Fa'avae were both raised in Tasman. A Harley Davidson motorbike group, Sons of Tasman, also originates from Tasman.

At the annual Muddy Buddy event, attendees in fancy dress get caked in mud from the inlet and are then cleaned off with fire hoses.

== History ==
Tasman was originally named Aporo (the Māori word for apple), but was renamed in 1906 after Dutch explorer Abel Tasman.

The economy was originally based around orchards, but is increasingly based on arts, crafts, vineyards and tourism.

In March 2018, work began on a new 96-lot housing development south of the main village. Landowner Alan Trent, an American businessman, had originally proposed a development with 130 resident sections, 55 apartments, shops, a village plaza, open space, and lifestyle farmland. The plans were scaled back due to community opposition. Trent had put his nearby home on the market for $8.9 million in January 2016.

In December 2018, a local landowner sought planning approval for a small industrial development next to the village. Some residents opposed it, arguing it would affect the village's "rural charm".

== Demographics ==
=== Tasman settlement ===
Tasman is described by Statistics New Zealand as a rural settlement. It covers 7.48 km^{2} (2.89 sq mi) and had an estimated population of 700 as of June 2025, with a population density of 94 people per km^{2}. It is part of the larger Moutere Hills statistical area.

Historical population for Tasman settlement
Year	Pop.	±% p.a.
2006	345	—
2013	435	+3.37%
2018	525	+3.83%
2023	648	+4.30%
The 2006 population is for a smaller area of 6.54 km^{2}. Source:

Tasman had a population of 648 in the 2023 New Zealand census, an increase of 123 people (23.4%) since the 2018 census, and an increase of 213 people (49.0%) since the 2013 census. There were 324 males and 324 females in 246 dwellings. 1.9% of people identified as LGBTIQ+. The median age was 48.3 years (compared with 38.1 years nationally). There were 120 people (18.5%) aged under 15 years, 78 (12.0%) aged 15 to 29, 327 (50.5%) aged 30 to 64, and 126 (19.4%) aged 65 or older.

People could identify as more than one ethnicity. The results were 94.0% European (Pākehā), 7.9% Māori, 1.4% Pasifika, 2.3% Asian, and 5.1% other, which includes people giving their ethnicity as "New Zealander". English was spoken by 98.6%, Māori by 0.9%, and other languages by 11.1%. No language could be spoken by 0.9% (e.g. too young to talk). New Zealand Sign Language was known by 0.9%. The percentage of people born overseas was 25.0, compared with 28.8% nationally.

Religious affiliations were 21.3% Christian, 0.9% Buddhist, 0.5% New Age, and 0.9% other religions. People who answered that they had no religion were 67.1%, and 8.3% of people did not answer the census question.

Of those at least 15 years old, 171 (32.4%) people had a bachelor's or higher degree, 270 (51.1%) had a post-high school certificate or diploma, and 81 (15.3%) people exclusively held high school qualifications. The median income was $43,100, compared with $41,500 nationally. 75 people (14.2%) earned over $100,000 compared to 12.1% nationally. The employment status of those at least 15 was 246 (46.6%) full-time, 108 (20.5%) part-time, and 9 (1.7%) unemployed.

=== Moutere Hills statistical area ===
Moutere Hills, which includes Mahana and Upper Moutere, covers 86.54 km^{2} (33.41 sq mi) and had an estimated population of 2,710 as of June 2025, with a population density of 31 people per km^{2}.

Historical population for Moutere Hills
Year	Pop.	±% p.a.
2006	2,226	—
2013	1,836	−2.71%
2018	2,133	+3.04%
2023	2,562	+3.73%
The 2006 population is for a larger area of 98.43 km^{2}. Source:

Moutere Hills had a population of 2,562 in the 2023 New Zealand census, an increase of 429 people (20.1%) since the 2018 census, and an increase of 726 people (39.5%) since the 2013 census. There were 1,275 males, 1,275 females, and 15 people of other genders in 924 dwellings. 2.5% of people identified as LGBTIQ+. The median age was 47.9 years (compared with 38.1 years nationally). There were 444 people (17.3%) aged under 15 years, 312 (12.2%) aged 15 to 29, 1,290 (50.4%) aged 30 to 64, and 516 (20.1%) aged 65 or older.

People could identify as more than one ethnicity. The results were 95.1% European (Pākehā); 6.3% Māori; 1.1% Pasifika; 2.0% Asian; 0.6% Middle Eastern, Latin American and African New Zealanders (MELAA); and 3.6% other, which includes people giving their ethnicity as "New Zealander". English was spoken by 98.2%, Māori by 1.3%, and other languages by 10.3%. No language could be spoken by 1.4% (e.g. too young to talk). New Zealand Sign Language was known by 0.5%. The percentage of people born overseas was 27.6, compared with 28.8% nationally.

Religious affiliations were 22.1% Christian, 0.2% Hindu, 0.1% Islam, 0.2% Māori religious beliefs, 0.9% Buddhist, 0.5% New Age, and 1.3% other religions. People who answered that they had no religion were 65.9%, and 8.8% of people did not answer the census question.

Of those at least 15 years old, 645 (30.5%) people had a bachelor's or higher degree, 1,110 (52.4%) had a post-high school certificate or diploma, and 366 (17.3%) people exclusively held high school qualifications. The median income was $40,400, compared with $41,500 nationally. 276 people (13.0%) earned over $100,000 compared to 12.1% nationally. The employment status of those at least 15 was 1,038 (49.0%) full-time, 399 (18.8%) part-time, and 33 (1.6%) unemployed.

== Education ==
Tasman School is a co-educational state primary school for Year 1 to 8 students, with a roll of 114 as of July 2026. Every two years, the school holds a fundraising food and wine market called Taste Tasman. It opened in 1914 as Aporo School.

Tasman Bay Christian School is a co-educational state-integrated Christian primary school for Year 1 to 8 students, with a roll of 47. It opened in 1986.
