= Dove River (Tasman) =

Coordinates: 41°15′55″S 172°49′42″E

Location
- Country: New Zealand

Physical characteristics
- Source
  - location: Tasman Region
- Mouth
  - location: Motueka River

The Dove River is a river in the Tasman Region of New Zealand. It arises in hills between the Wai-iti River and Motueka River and flows north-west into the Motueka near the locality of Woodstock. The river is named for the native New Zealand pigeons once found in the forests around the river.

Brown trout can be found in the lower reaches of the river.

== See also ==
- List of rivers of New Zealand
