= Hope Saddle =

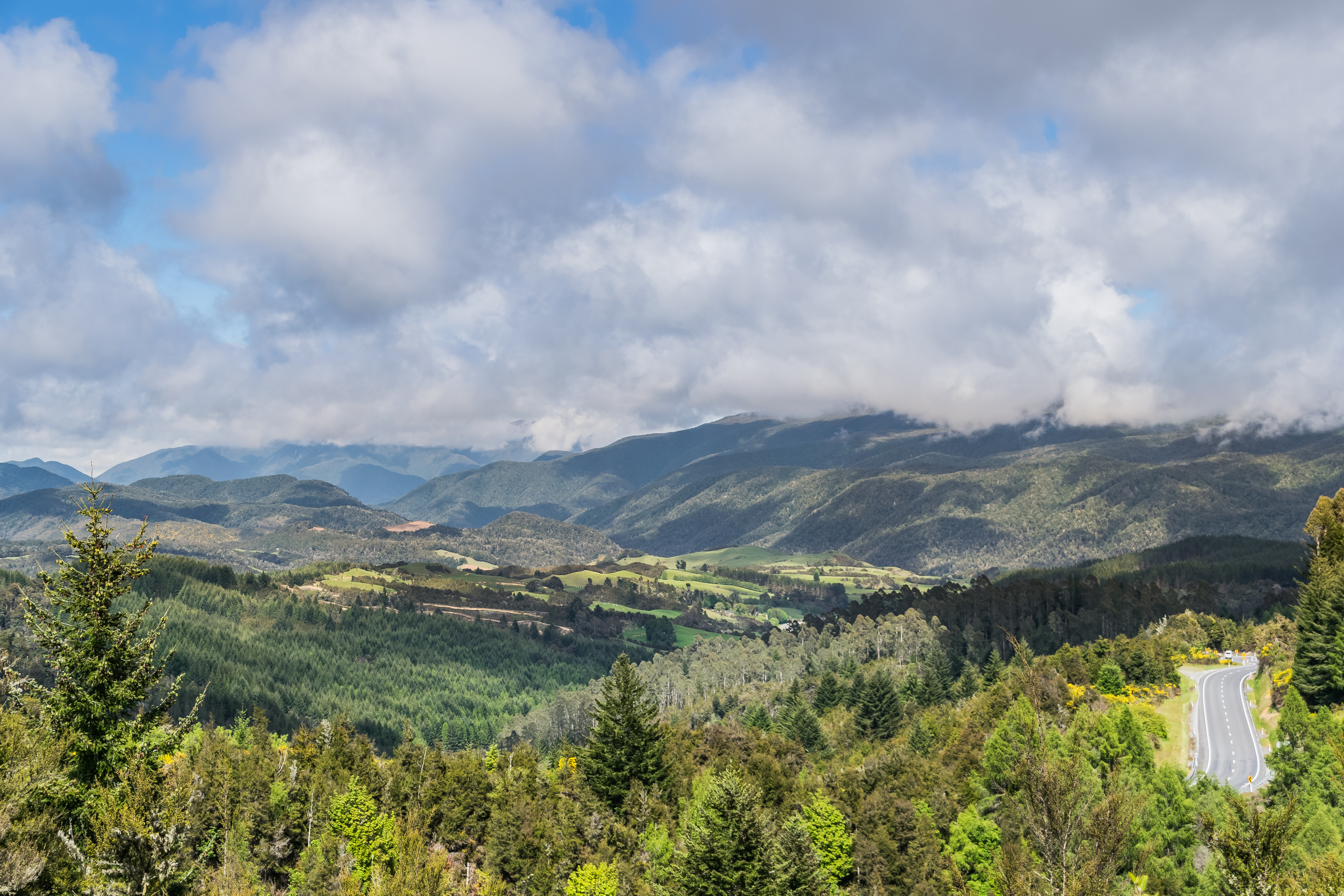
- View from Hope Saddle Lookout
- Interactive map of Hope Saddle
- Elevation: 634 metres (2,080 ft)
- Traversed by: State Highway 6

Third Approach
- Location: New Zealand
- Range: Hope Range
- Coordinates: 41°37′44″S 172°43′11″E

Hope Saddle (634 m or 2,080 ft above sea level) is a saddle located south of Richmond, in the Hope Range of the northern South Island. It lies above the Clark Valley.

In 1871 a track was cut over the Hope Saddle ensuring there was a route from Westport to Nelson. Horse-drawn vehicles began using the track in 1879. This track would become part of State Highway 6. The view from the Hope Saddle is regarded as being "magnificent".
