= Upper Moutere =

Rural locality in Tasman, New Zealand

- Rural locality
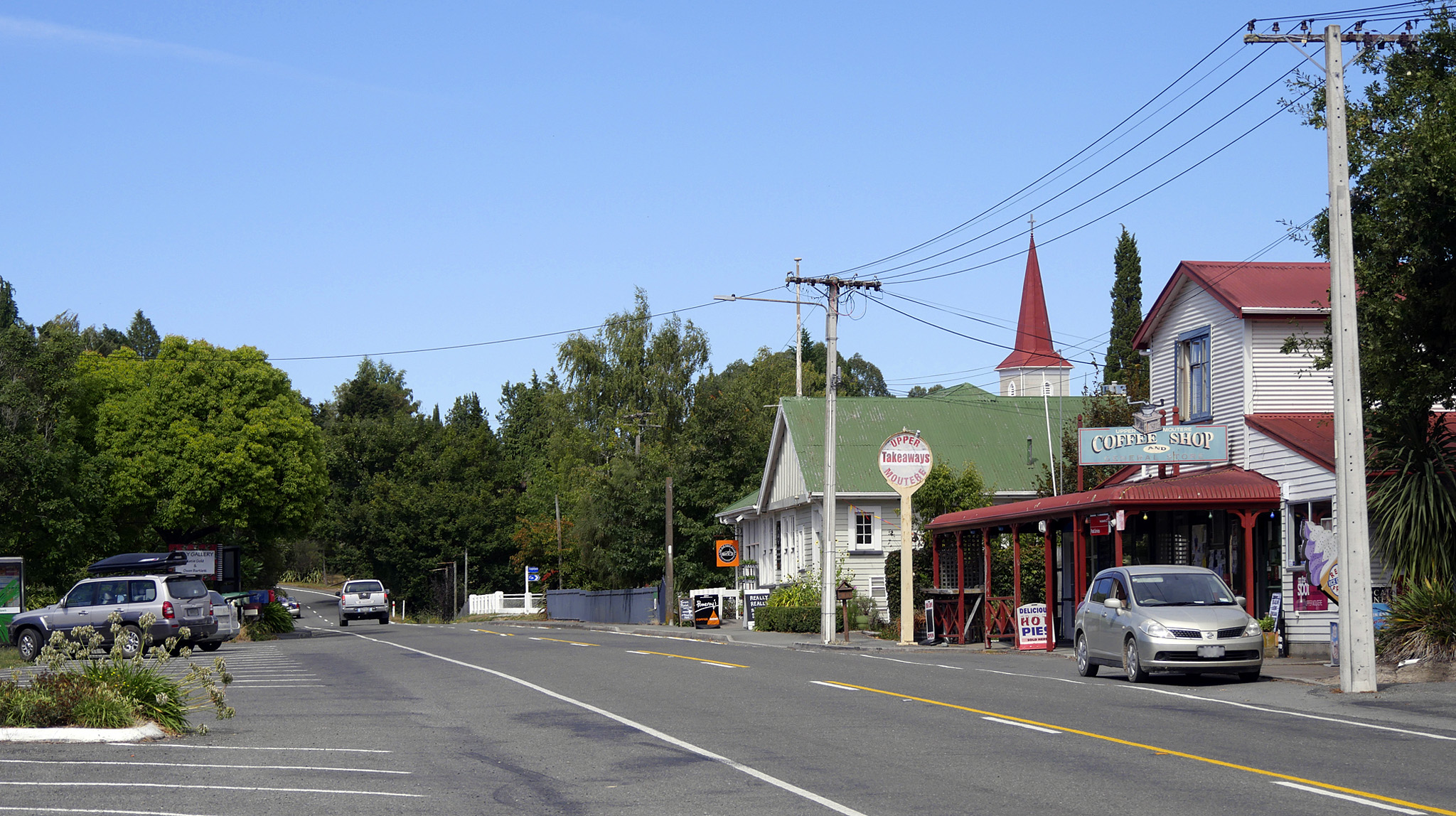
- Centre of village
- Interactive map of Upper Moutere
- Coordinates: 41.270°S 173.006°E
- Country: New Zealand
- Territorial authority: Tasman
- Ward: Moutere-Waimea Ward
- Electorates: West Coast-Tasman; Te Tai Tonga (Māori)

Government
  - Territorial Authority: Tasman District Council
  - Mayor of Tasman: Tim King
  - West Coast-Tasman MP: Maureen Pugh
  - Te Tai Tonga MP: Tākuta Ferris

Area
  - Total: 34.82 km^{2} (13.44 sq mi)

Population (2023 Census)
  - Total: 432
  - Density: 12.4/km^{2} (32.1/sq mi)
- Time zone: UTC+12 (New Zealand Standard Time)
  - Summer (DST): UTC+13 (New Zealand Daylight Time)
- Postcode: 7173

Upper Moutere (originally called Sarau by its founding German settlers) is a locality in the Tasman District near Motueka at the top of New Zealand's South Island.

== History ==
As early as 1839 the New Zealand Company had resolved to "take steps to procure German emigrants" and appointed a Mr Bockelman as agent of the Company in Bremen. In September 1841 the Company made an agreement in principle to sell the Chatham Islands to the Hamburg-based Deutsche Colonisation-Gesellschaft, but the British Government thwarted this move.

However, Lord Stanley, then the British Secretary of State for War and the Colonies, did agree to make the German colonists instant British subjects upon arrival in Nelson after being vetted in Hamburg first.

Most of the 140 German immigrants who arrived on the ship St Pauli in 1843 and formed the nucleus of the villages of Sarau (now known as Upper Moutere) and Neudorf. They were Lutheran Protestants with a small number of Bavarian Catholics.

The trip had lasted 176 days, during which time four young children had perished, seven couples had been joined in Holy Matrimony, one baby had been born and two passengers had jumped ship at a re-provisioning harbour. After a brief initial period of prosperity the inherent problems of lack of land and capital caught up with the Nelson settlements and they entered a prolonged period of relative depression. Organised immigration ceased until the 1850s and labourers had to accept a cut in their wages by one third. By the end of 1843 artisans and labourers began leaving Nelson and by 1846 a quarter of the immigrants had moved away.

Charles Kelling was in charge of the second German immigration ship to the Nelson region, the Skjold, which arrived in 1844. He moved to Sarau after first having established the village of Ranzau with his brother Fedor. Charles Kelling became a community leader in Sarau. He represented the Moutere (1862–1869) and then the Waimea West (1869–1873) electorates on the Nelson Provincial Council.

Sarau was renamed Upper Moutere as a result of the anti-German feeling aroused by the First World War.

== Demographics ==
Upper Moutere locality covers 34.82 km^{2} (13.44 sq mi) It is part of the Moutere Hills statistical area.

Historical population of Upper Moutere locality
Year	Pop.	±% p.a.
2006	372	—
2013	390	+0.68%
2018	408	+0.91%
2023	432	+1.15%

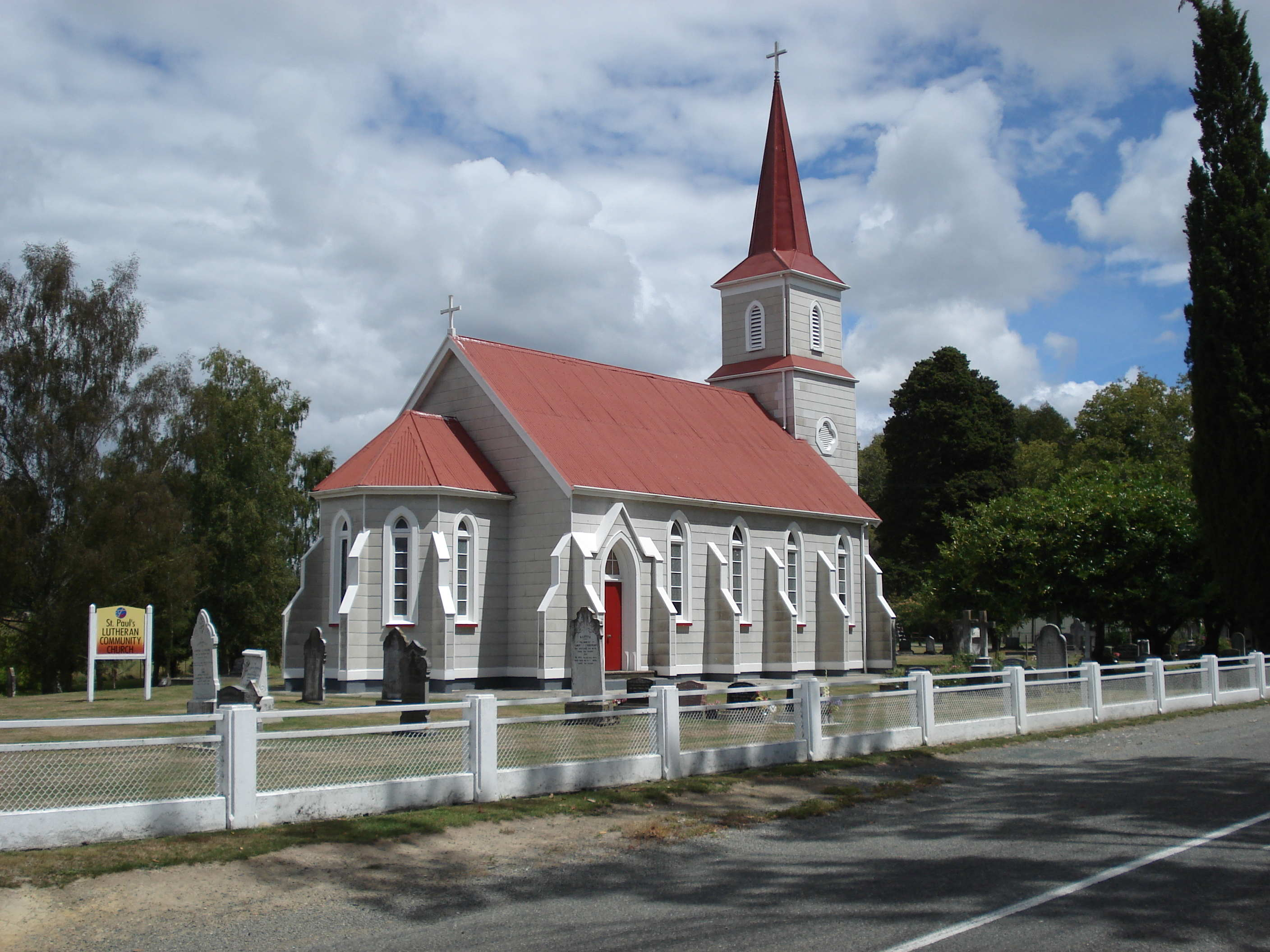
St. Paul's Lutheran Church

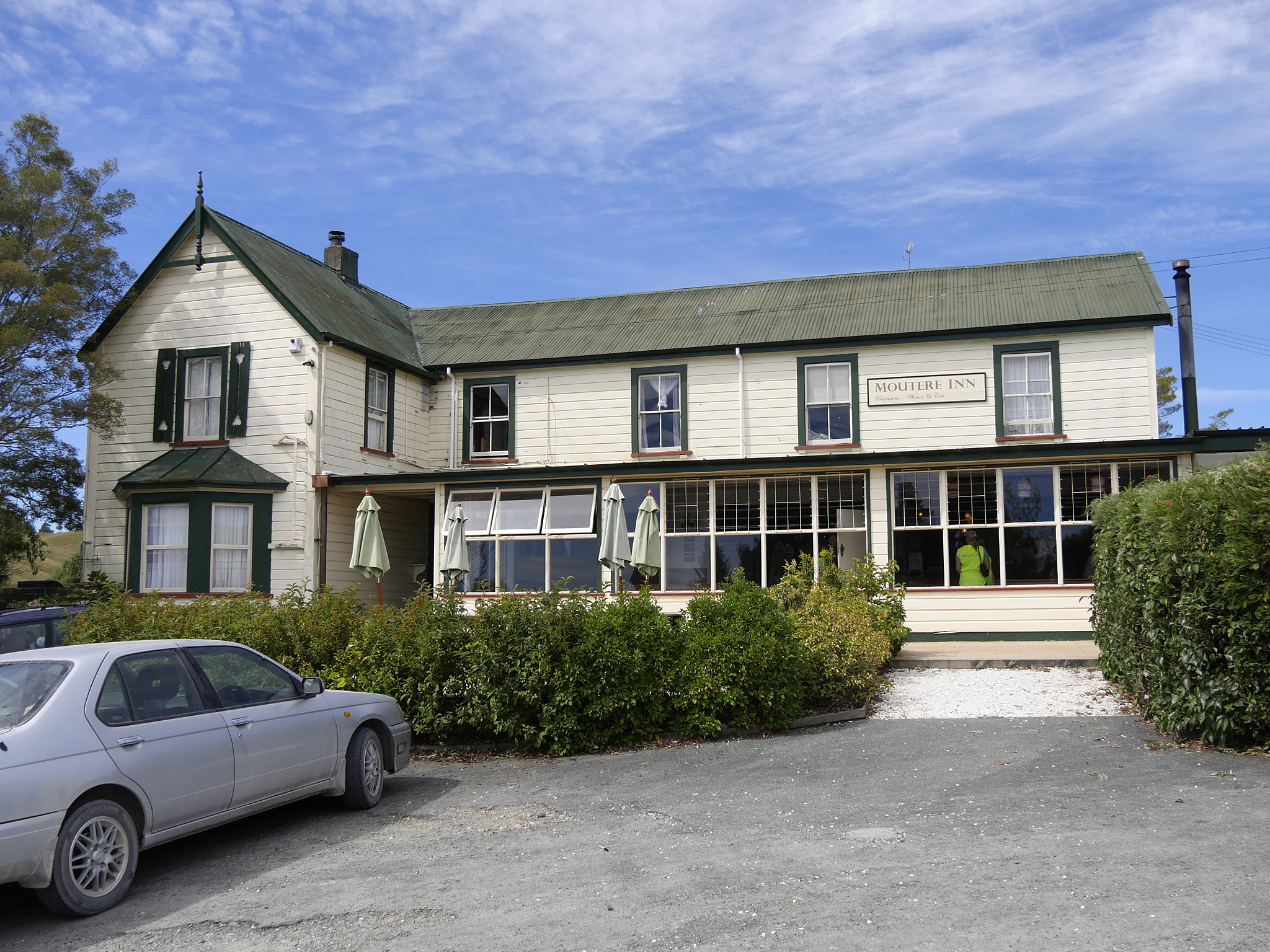
Moutere Inn

Upper Moutere had a population of 432 in the 2023 New Zealand census, an increase of 24 people (5.9%) since the 2018 census, and an increase of 42 people (10.8%) since the 2013 census. There were 210 males, 222 females, and 3 people of other genders in 153 dwellings. 3.5% of people identified as LGBTIQ+. There were 72 people (16.7%) aged under 15 years, 48 (11.1%) aged 15 to 29, 213 (49.3%) aged 30 to 64, and 108 (25.0%) aged 65 or older.

People could identify as more than one ethnicity. The results were 96.5% European (Pākehā); 6.9% Māori; 0.7% Pasifika; 2.1% Asian; 1.4% Middle Eastern, Latin American and African New Zealanders (MELAA); and 4.2% other, which includes people giving their ethnicity as "New Zealander". English was spoken by 97.2%, Māori by 2.1%, and other languages by 11.1%. No language could be spoken by 1.4% (e.g. too young to talk). The percentage of people born overseas was 30.6, compared with 28.8% nationally.

Religious affiliations were 20.8% Christian, 0.7% Hindu, 0.7% Islam, 2.8% Buddhist, 1.4% New Age, and 0.7% other religions. People who answered that they had no religion were 65.3%, and 6.9% of people did not answer the census question.

Of those at least 15 years old, 111 (30.8%) people had a bachelor's or higher degree, 198 (55.0%) had a post-high school certificate or diploma, and 57 (15.8%) people exclusively held high school qualifications. 36 people (10.0%) earned over $100,000 compared to 12.1% nationally. The employment status of those at least 15 was 174 (48.3%) full-time, 66 (18.3%) part-time, and 9 (2.5%) unemployed.

=== Upper Moutere statistical area ===
Upper Moutere statistical area, which includes Dovedale, Ngātīmoti and Woodstock, is west of the locality, and does not include it. It covers 445.94 km^{2} (172.18 sq mi) and had an estimated population of 2,020 as of June 2025, with a population density of 4.5 people per km^{2}.

Historical population of Upper Moutere statistical area
Year	Pop.	±% p.a.
2006	1,677	—
2013	1,830	+1.26%
2018	1,962	+1.40%
2023	1,971	+0.09%

The statistical area had a population of 1,971 in the 2023 New Zealand census, an increase of 9 people (0.5%) since the 2018 census, and an increase of 141 people (7.7%) since the 2013 census. There were 1,002 males, 966 females, and 6 people of other genders in 753 dwellings. 1.8% of people identified as LGBTIQ+. The median age was 47.7 years (compared with 38.1 years nationally). There were 318 people (16.1%) aged under 15 years, 276 (14.0%) aged 15 to 29, 978 (49.6%) aged 30 to 64, and 396 (20.1%) aged 65 or older.

People could identify as more than one ethnicity. The results were 94.1% European (Pākehā); 8.2% Māori; 2.1% Pasifika; 1.5% Asian; 0.8% Middle Eastern, Latin American and African New Zealanders (MELAA); and 4.3% other, which includes people giving their ethnicity as "New Zealander". English was spoken by 98.5%, Māori by 1.8%, Samoan by 0.2%, and other languages by 10.0%. No language could be spoken by 1.2% (e.g. too young to talk). New Zealand Sign Language was known by 0.5%. The percentage of people born overseas was 24.0, compared with 28.8% nationally.

Religious affiliations were 19.9% Christian, 0.8% Hindu, 0.2% Islam, 0.6% Buddhist, 0.9% New Age, 0.2% Jewish, and 0.9% other religions. People who answered that they had no religion were 66.5%, and 10.2% of people did not answer the census question.

Of those at least 15 years old, 381 (23.0%) people had a bachelor's or higher degree, 903 (54.6%) had a post-high school certificate or diploma, and 372 (22.5%) people exclusively held high school qualifications. The median income was $31,300, compared with $41,500 nationally. 129 people (7.8%) earned over $100,000 compared to 12.1% nationally. The employment status of those at least 15 was 768 (46.5%) full-time, 312 (18.9%) part-time, and 24 (1.5%) unemployed.

== Education ==
Upper Moutere School is a co-educational state primary school for Year 1 to 8 students, with a roll of 100 as of July 2026. The first school in Upper Moutere opened in 1857. The current school opened in 1929, with the classroom from the first school moved to the current grounds in the 1940s. This classroom may be the oldest still in use in New Zealand.
