= Motueka River =

Coordinates: 41°05′S 173°01′E

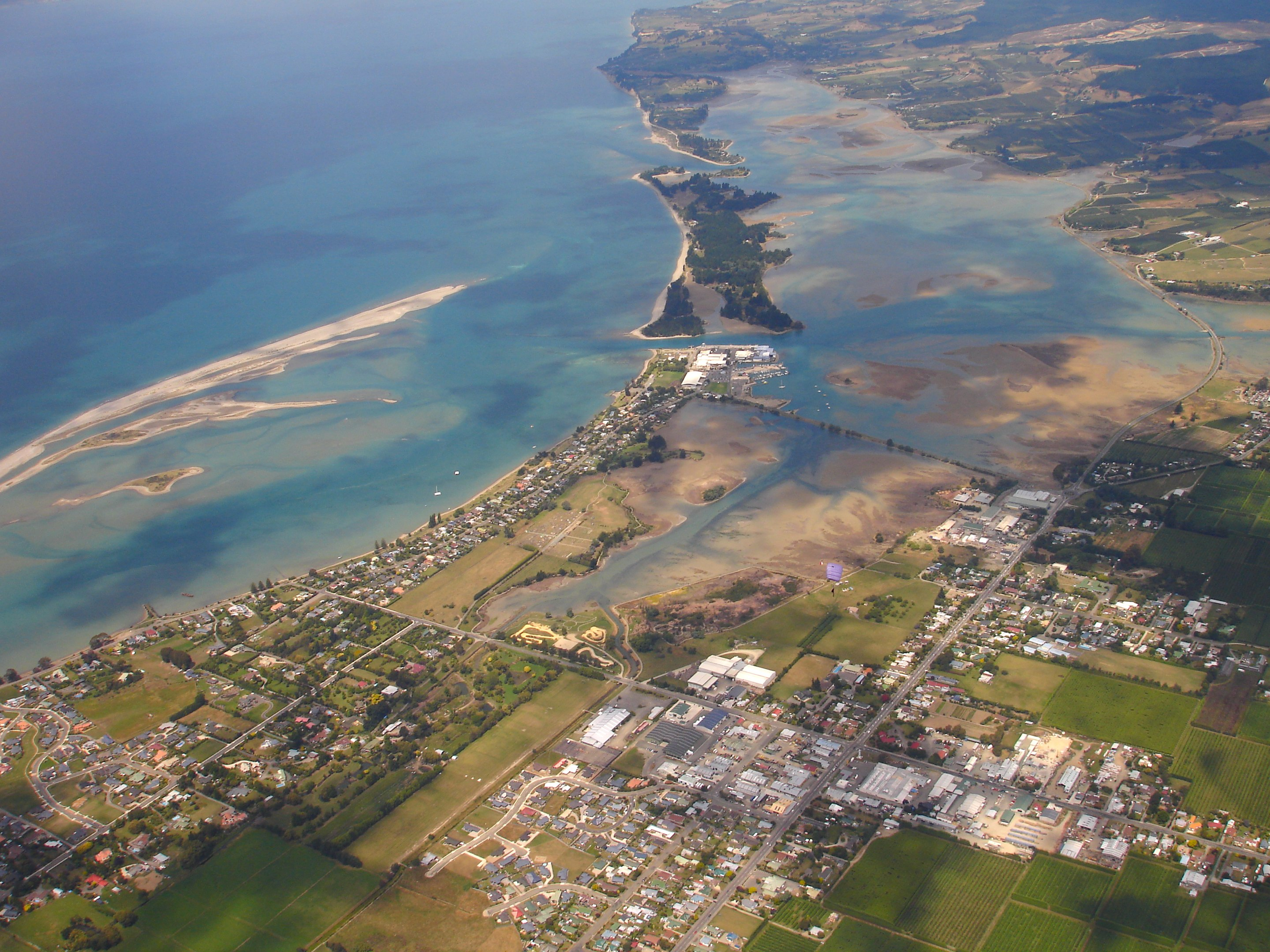

Location
- Country: New Zealand

Physical characteristics
- Source
  - location: Red Hills in South East of catchment
  - elevation: 1,400m
- Mouth
  - elevation: Sea level
- Length: 116 km (72 mi)

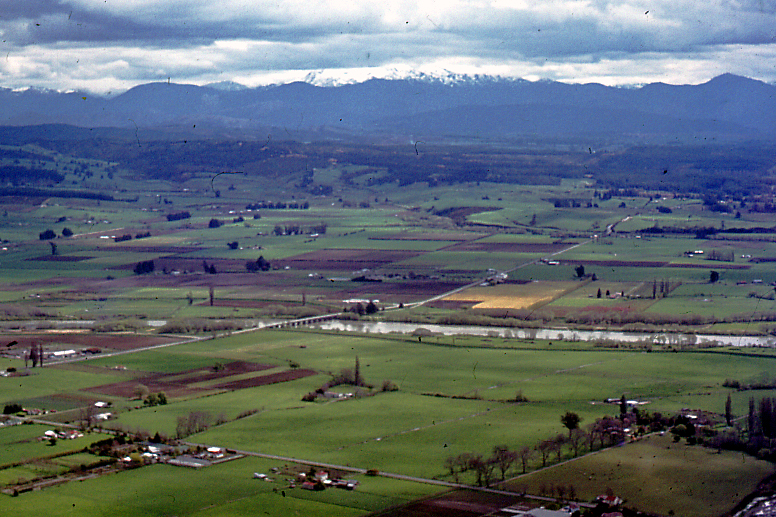
The Motueka River near Tapawera, 1979

The Motueka River is located in the north of the South Island of New Zealand and is a popular tourist destination for watersports and fishing. The Motueka flows 116 kilometres (72 mi) from the mountains 40 km west of the city of Nelson in the southeast of the catchment and flows north to the Tasman Bay.

== Geography ==
The Motueka River lies 60 kilometres to the south of Nelson, and flows for 120 kilometres, first through rough hill country and then the more gently undulating terrain southwest of Tasman Bay, passing by many small communities such as Ngātīmoti, Woodstock, Riwaka, Brooklyn and many others as it makes its way its outflow into the bay close to the town of Motueka. These communities are connected to the town of Motueka in the north and SH 6 in the south by the Motueka Valley Highway.

The Motueka has three major tributaries, the Motupiko River, Wangapeka River and the Baton River, as well as smaller tributaries called the Pearse, Dove, Tadmor, and Rainy.

== Geology ==
The river runs through a wide band of granite and areas of recent alluvium, with a complex mix of sedimentary and igneous rocks, originating from the mountainous terrain of the Arthur Range which form the western boundary of the catchment area. and a region of clay-bound gravels to the eastern boundary. As well as the granites, the wide variety of rock types found along the course of the river include complex basement rock, ultramafic, old and young sedimentary rocks.

== Flooding and river flow ==
The Motueka is a large river with average annual flow of 59 cubic meters per second and a flow range from 6 to more than 2,100 cubic meters per second. The average monthly flow has seasonal variation and it at its highest in winter and spring. The mountain catchment areas to the west and southeast have the highest rainfall and provide most of the mean annual flow for the Motueka River. Significant flooding was a serious problem for the local population and a major flood in 1877 led to widespread erosion and changed the course of the river in several areas. There have since been serious flooding in January 1895, July 1929, June 1954 and April 1957 but this was thought to have been addressed when the Motueka Catchment Control Scheme was completed in 1982. In May 2010, however, twenty homes were flooded by the Motueka River in the Wangapeka area near Tapawera and residents had to be evacuated.

== Fishing ==
The river is well known for its excellent Brown trout fishing throughout its entire length. Large numbers of trout range below the Wangapeka confluence and very large trophy fish have been caught.

== Watersports ==
The river is also noted for rafting, canoeing or just drifting down on an inner-tube. Kayaks can be hired from a number of commercial companies and organised trips are available.

== Invasive algae ==
Precautions have been taken to control the spread of an invasive algae Didymosphenia geminata, commonly known as 'didymo' or 'rock snot', a species of diatom, in the Motueka River and its tributaries,. This algae grows in warm and shallow water and can form large mats on the bottom of rivers. It is not considered a health risk but can affect stream habitats and sources of food for fish and make recreational activities unpleasant. It is considered a nuisance organism or invasive species. The microscopic algae can be spread in a single drop of water, so anglers must clean their waders and boots before moving to different rivers or face a fine of up to $100,000 or up to five years in prison.

== Integrated Catchment Management (ICM) project ==
The Motueka River has a wide range of land uses over its catchment of over 2000 square kilometers which include agriculture, with hops, tobacco, Asian pears and kiwifruit grown on the banks of the middle and the lower reaches and commercial forestry on lowland and hill areas. The livestock farming uses include sheep and beef farming and, increasingly, dairy farming, which requires a number of cow crossings on the river that can affect water quality, through introducing fecal coliform microbes and conflict with sports such as fishing. A special research project was therefore established as part of a nine-year programme that began in July 2000 and ended in September 2010. The aim of the research was to provide information to support the management of the environment of the area using an 'Integrated Catchment Management' (ICM) approach. This recognises the catchment or river basin as an ecosystem and includes consideration of social, economic and political factors.

== Water quality ==
The Motueka River is relatively unpolluted compared to most New Zealand rivers and usually meets the water quality requirements for swimming under baseflow conditions.
