= Mayor of Tasman =

Elected office in New Zealand

Mayor of Tasman District
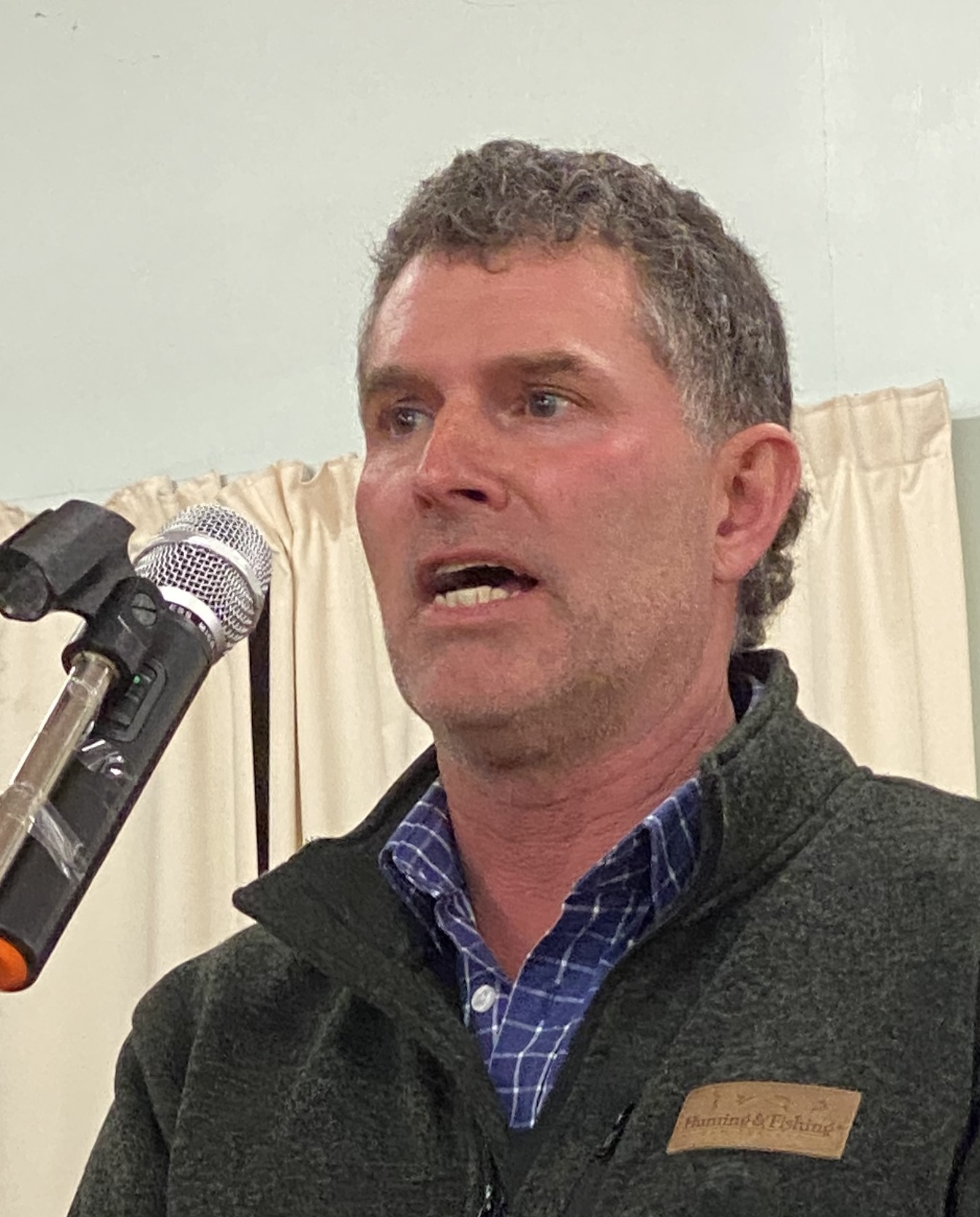
- Incumbent; Tim King since 2019
- Style: His/Her Worship
- Term length: Three years
- Inaugural holder: Kerry Marshall
- Formation: 1989
- Salary: $156,156
- Website: Official website

The mayor of Tasman officiates over the Tasman District Council. The mayor is directly elected using the first-past-the-post electoral system.

The current mayor has, since the 2019 local elections, been Tim King.

== History ==
Tasman District was established as part of the 1989 local government reforms. Kerry Marshall, who had been mayor of Richmond borough since 1986, became the first mayor of Tasman in 1989.

After three terms by Marshall, John Hurley was voted in as the second mayor in 1998. In the 2001 election, Colleen Marshall, the wife of Kerry Marshall, contested the mayoralty, but Hurley was re-elected. Hurley remained mayor until he was defeated by Kempthorne in the 2007 elections, when four candidates contested the position and Kempthorne received 49% of the votes. The 2010 local elections were contested by three candidates, and Kempthorne was returned with an absolute majority. The 2013 local elections were contested by five candidates, and Kempthorne had a slim majority over sitting councillor Kit Maling.

After four terms by Kempthorne, Tim King was voted in as the fourth mayor in 2019. The election was contested by four candidates with King securing a comfortable lead over the other candidates. King had served as a Tasman district councillor for 21 years, including 18 years as deputy mayor.

== List of mayors ==
Tasman has had four mayors:

	Name	Portrait	Term
1	Kerry Marshall		1989–1998
2	John Hurley		1998–2007
3	Richard Kempthorne		2007–2019
4	Tim King		2019–present
