= List of Nelson representative cricketers =

This is a list of cricketers who played first-class cricket for the Nelson cricket team in New Zealand. Nelson played a total of 17 first-class matches between the 1873–74 season and 1891–92, all but one of which were played against Wellington. The team has competed in the Hawke Cup competition for minor associations from 1921 to 1922.

Players are listed with the seasons in which they played. Some players also appeared in first-class or Hawke Cup matches for other teams.

== A ==
- Joseph Adcock
- John Arnold
- William Arnold
- James Askew
- Frederick Atkinson

== B ==
- Louis Balmain (Note: Born in England in 1858, Balmain was a soldier who spent only a short time in New Zealand during which time he played his only known cricket. His only first-class match was a December 1880 fixture against Wellington. Batting at number three, Balmain made 50 and 40, the two highest scores on either team in the drawn match. His half-century was one of only two scored by Nelson players in their 17 first-class matches. One newspaper described Balmain’s 50 as "the best innings seen on the Wellington ground for a long time". He had played some local cricket before the Wellington match, and appeared again for Nelson in February 1881, one of 22 Nelson cricketers who played the touring Australians. In September 1884, Balmain married Laura Harris at Dereham in Ontario, Canada. She died of tuberculosis in Oxford, Ontario, in 1897 and Balmain is believed to have died in Canada in 1904.)
- David Barnett
- Andrew Bennett
- Alfred Bigg-Wither
- James Bigg-Wither
- Edward Boddington
- Henry Boddington
- Samuel Bolton
- Robertson Booth
- Charles Broad
- Edward Broad
- David Burns

== C ==
- Richard Canney
- Alfred Coles
- John Collins
- Frank Cooke
- Chris Cross
- Henry Cross

== D ==
- Henry Dencker
- William Denshire

== E ==
- Jim Eden
- Thomas Eden
- William Eden

== F ==
- Herman Fayen
- Joseph Firth
- William Justice Ford
- George Fowler
- Louis Fowler
- Samuel Fowler

== G ==
- Arthur Green
- Alfred Greenfield
- Francis Greenfield

== H ==
- Charles Halliday
- Harry Halliday
- Rayner Hodder
- Henry Hole
- William Holmes
- Joseph Humphries

== K ==
- Herbert Kissling
- Charles Knapp
- Kempster Knapp
- Harvey Knapp

== L ==
- Austin Lines
- William Littlejohn

== M ==
- Robert Malcolm

== N ==
- John Naylor

== P ==
- Leslie Pattie
- Samuel Powell

== R ==
- George Richardson

== S ==
- Robert Satchell
- Melville Sellon
- George Silcock
- James Speed

== T ==
- Robert Tennent

== W ==
- BH White
- James Wigzell
- Arthur Wix
- James Wood
- William Wratt

== Bibliography ==
- McCarron, Tony (2010). New Zealand Cricketers 1863/64–2010. Cardiff: The Association of Cricket Statisticians and Historians. ISBN 978 1 905138 98 2 (Available online at the Association of Cricket Statisticians and Historians.)
