= George Fowler (cricketer) =

New Zealand cricketer

Personal information
- Born: 26 October 1860; Nelson, New Zealand
- Died: 14 May 1934 (aged 73); Blenheim, New Zealand
- Relatives: Samuel Fowler (brother); Louis Fowler (brother)

Domestic team information
- Years: Team
- 1879/80–1887/88: Nelson

Career statistics
Competition	First-class
Matches	7
Runs scored	97
Batting average	8.08
100s/50s	0/0
Top score	28
Balls bowled	1,019
Wickets	49
Bowling average	9.95
5 wickets in innings	6
10 wickets in match	2
Best bowling	6/9
Catches/stumpings	3/–
- Source: CricketArchive, 3 May 2019

George Fowler (26 October 1860 – 14 May 1934) was a New Zealand cricketer who played first-class cricket for Nelson from 1879 to 1887. His brothers Samuel and Louis also played for Nelson.

== Cricket career ==
George Fowler achieved some remarkable bowling figures, especially in Nelson. Against Wellington at the Botanical Gardens ground in 1883-84 he bowled unchanged through both innings and took 5 for 10 and 5 for 13 (match figures of 28.4–16–23–10; five-ball overs) in a match in which 40 wickets fell for just 183 runs. Nine of his victims were bowled. Nelson won by 39 runs. At a temporary ground on the outskirts of Nelson in 1887–88, also against Wellington, he took 6 for 9 and 5 for 16 (match figures of 23.3–11–25–11; five-ball overs again) to give Nelson a nine-wicket victory in a match which was completed in one day. This time 159 runs were scored for 31 wickets.

In the match Nelson played against the touring Australians in 1880-81 at Victory Square in Nelson, Fowler had figures of 32–19–32–4 (four-ball overs) then top-scored with 16 in Nelson's second innings. In the whole match only his brother Samuel, with 30 in Nelson's first innings, made a higher score. He hit his highest score in the match against Auckland at Victory Square in 1882–83, when he made 28 in Nelson's second innings – the second-highest individual score of the match. He also took 2 for 38 and 6 for 42, for match figures of 52–23–80–8. Despite his efforts, Nelson lost by 4 runs.

Fowler's career bowling figures are not known exactly, as the bowling figures for the second innings of his first first-class match, when he was 19 years old, are unknown. He took four wickets, and the batsmen scored 24, so his figures in the innings were at best 4 for 0 and at worst 4 for 24. Therefore, his career figures were 49 wickets for between 313 and 337, at an average of between 6.38 and 6.87.

== Later life ==
Fowler lived at Spring Grove, near Brightwater. Later he and his wife Kate moved to Blenheim, where she died in May 1923 and he died in May 1934.
