= Australian cricket team in England in 1880 =

International cricket tour

The Australian cricket team in England in 1880 played nine first-class matches including one Test, which was the first ever played in England. They were captained by W.L. Murdoch. The team had difficulty in arranging fixtures against the counties, and prior to the Test match in early September had played only four matches that are now rated as first-class (as well as many fixtures against weaker opposition), despite having already been in England for almost four months.

The Test was a late addition to the programme, being arranged at the instigation of the Surrey secretary, C. W. Alcock, who asked Lord Harris to put together a side. A. N. Hornby, Tom Emmett and George Ulyett refused to play, having unpleasant memories of the Sydney Riot of 1879, but Australia were also seriously handicapped, being without their star bowler, Fred Spofforth.

The Australians won 4, drew 3 and lost 2 of their first-class fixtures. Their only loss other than to England was to Nottinghamshire. That defeat was by only one wicket and came in a match in which they played a man short.

== Australian tour party ==
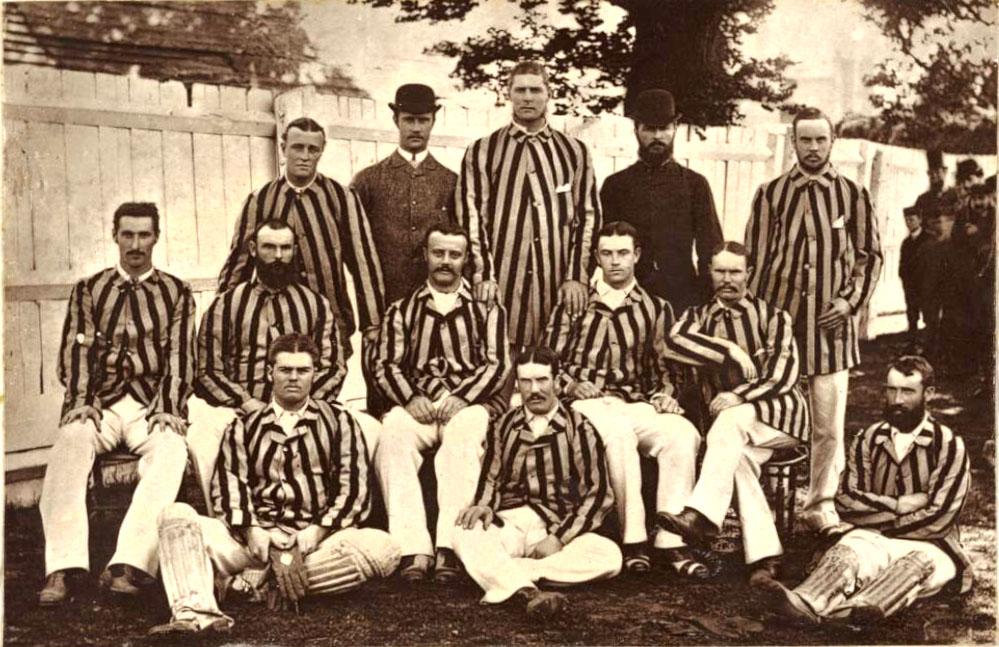
The Australian team that toured England in 1880.

The Australian party consisted of: W.L. Murdoch (captain), A.C. Bannerman, J.McC. Blackham, G.J. Bonnor, H.F. Boyle, T.U. Groube, A.H. Jarvis, P.S. McDonnell, W.H. Moule, G.E. Palmer, J. Slight, F.R. Spofforth, G. Alexander (player-manager).

== Tour matches ==
| No. | Date | Opponents | Venue | Result | Ref |
|---|---|---|---|---|---|
| | 13–14 May | 18 of St Luke's | Antelope Ground, Southampton | Won by an innings and 22 runs | |
| 1 | 17–18 May | Derbyshire | County Ground, Derby | Won by eight wickets | |
| | 18 May | Derbyshire (fill-up match) | County Ground, Derby | Drawn | |
| | 20–22 May | 18 of Longsight | East Road, Longsight, Manchester | Won by ten wickets | |
| | 22 May | 18 of Longsight (fill-up match) | East Road, Longsight, Manchester | Drawn | |
| | 27–29 May | 18 of Rochdale | Butcher Meadow, Rochdale | Won by an innings and 26 runs | |
| | 29 May | 18 of Rochdale (fill-up match) | Butcher Meadow, Rochdale | Drawn | |
| | 31 May–2 June | 18 of Keighley | Hard Ings Road, Keighley | Drawn | |
| | 3–4 June | 18 of Burnley and District | Turf Moor, Burnley | Won by an innings and 27 runs | |
| | 5 June | 18 of Burnley and District (fill-up match) | Turf Moor, Burnley | Drawn | |
| | 7–9 June | 18 of Malton | Old Malton Road, Malton | Won by four wickets | |
| 2 | 10–11 June | Yorkshire | Dewsbury and Savile Ground, Dewsbury | Won by five wickets | |
| | 11–12 June | Yorkshire (fill-up match) | Dewsbury and Savile Ground, Dewsbury | Drawn | |
| | 14–16 June | 18 of North | Ormeau Cricket Ground, Belfast | Won by nine wickets | |
| | 17–18 June | 18 of Dublin University | College Park, Dublin | Drawn | |
| | 21–23 June | 18 of Birmingham | Aston Lower Grounds, Birmingham | Won by an innings and 9 runs | |
| | 23 Jun 1880 | 18 of Birmingham (fill-up match) | Aston Lower Grounds, Birmingham | Drawn | |
| | 24–26 June | 18 of Northampton | St James' End, Northampton | Won by eight wickets | |
| | 28–29 June | 18 of Harrogate | St George's Road, Harrogate | Won by ten wickets | |
| | 29–30 June | 18 of Harrogate | St George's Road, Harrogate | Drawn | |
| | 1–3 July | 18 of Newcastle upon Tyne | Bath Road Ground, Newcastle upon Tyne | Drawn | |
| | 5–6 Jul 1880 | 18 of Middlesbrough | Linthorpe Road West Ground, Middlesbrough | Won by an innings and 26 runs | |
| | 7 July | 18 of Middlesbrough (fill-up match) | Linthorpe Road West Ground, Middlesbrough | Drawn | |
| | 8–10 July | 18 of Broughton | Broughton Cricket Club Ground, Salford | Drawn | |
| | 12–14 July | Leicestershire | Grace Road, Leicester | Drawn | |
| | 16–17 July | 18 of Werneth | The Coppice, Oldham | Won by an innings and 21 runs | |
| | 17 July | 18 of Werneth (fill-up match) | The Coppice, Oldham | Drawn | |
| | 19–20 July | 18 of Crystal Palace | Crystal Palace Park, Crystal Palace | Won by ten wickets | |
| 3 | 22–24 July | Yorkshire | Fartown, Huddersfield | Drawn | |
| | 26–28 July | 18 of Hull | Argyle Street, Hull | Drawn | |
| | 29–31 July | 18 of Crewe | Alexandra Athletic Ground, Crewe | Drawn | |
| 4 | 2–4 August | Gloucestershire | Clifton College Close Ground, Clifton, Bristol | Won by 68 runs | |
| | 4 August | Gloucestershire (fill-up match) | Clifton College Close Ground, Clifton, Bristol | Won by ten wickets | |
| | 5–7 August | 18 of Hunslet | Woodhouse Hill Ground, Hunslet | Won by eight wickets | |
| | 7 August | 18 of Hunslet (fill-up match) | Woodhouse Hill Ground, Hunslet | Drawn | |
| | 9–10 August | 18 of Bradford | Park Avenue Cricket Ground, Bradford | Won by ten wickets | |
| | 10–11 August | 18 of Bradford (fill-up match) | Park Avenue Cricket Ground, Bradford | Won by three wickets | |
| | 12–13 August | 18 of Sunderland | Chester Road, Sunderland | Won by an innings and 38 runs | |
| | 13–14 August | 18 of Sunderland (fill-up match) | Chester Road, Sunderland | Drawn | |
| | 19–21 August | 18 of Scarborough | North Marine Road, Scarborough | Lost by 90 runs | |
| | 23–25 August | 18 of Yeadon | White Swan Ground, Yeadon | Won by an innings and 65 runs | |
| | 26–28 August | 18 of Stockport | Higher Hilgate, Stockport | Lost by 100 runs | |
| | 28 August | 15 of Stockport (fill-up match) | Higher Hilgate, Stockport | Drawn | |
| | 30 August–1 September | 18 of Hastings | Central Recreation Ground, Hastings | Drawn | |
| 5 | 6–8 September | ENGLAND | Kennington Oval, London | Lost by five wickets | |
| | 10–11 September | 18 of Glasgow | Titwood, Glasgow | Drawn | |
| 6 | 13–15 September | Sussex | County Ground, Hove | Drawn | |
| | 16–18 September | Scotland | Raeburn Place, Edinburgh | Won by six wickets | |
| 7 | 20–22 September | Players of the North | Park Avenue Cricket Ground, Bradford | Drawn | |
| 8 | 23–25 September | Nottinghamshire | Trent Bridge, Nottingham | Lost by one wicket | |
| 9 | 27–29 September | Players | Crystal Palace Park, Crystal Palace | Won by two wickets | |
| | 29 September | Players (fill-up match) | Crystal Palace Park, Crystal Palace | Drawn | |

== Test match ==
6–8 September 1880
Scorecard

| England | v | Australia |
| 420 (210.3 overs); W. G. Grace 152 (294); William Moule 3/23 (12.3 overs) | | 149 (75.1 overs); Harry Boyle 36* (47); Fred Morley 5/56 (32 overs) |
| 57/5 (33.3 overs); Frank Penn 27* (46); Joey Palmer 3/35 (16.3 overs) | | 327 (f/o) (176.3 overs); Billy Murdoch 153* (358); Fred Morley 3/90 (61 overs) |

England won by 5 wickets
Kennington Oval, London
Umpires: H. H. Stephenson (Eng) and Bob Thoms (Eng)

- England won the toss and elected to bat.
- George Alexander (Aus), George Bonnor (Aus), Thomas Groube (Aus), Percy McDonnell (Aus), William Moule (Aus), Joey Palmer (Aus), Jim Slight (Aus), Billy Barnes (Eng), E. M. Grace (Eng), Fred Grace (Eng), W. G. Grace (Eng), Alfred Lyttelton (Eng), Fred Morley (Eng), Frank Penn (Eng) and A. G. Steel (Eng) made their Test debut.

== See also ==
- History of Test cricket from 1877 to 1883

== Sources ==
- CricketArchive – season summaries

== Annual reviews ==
- James Lillywhite's Cricketers' Annual (Red Lilly) 1881
- John Lillywhite's Cricketer's Companion (Green Lilly) 1881
- Wisden Cricketers' Almanack 1881
