= Australian cricket team in New Zealand in 1880–81 =

International cricket tour

The Australian cricket team toured New Zealand in January and February 1881. The Australians played ten matches against provincial teams, nine of which fielded 22 players (the other team, Canterbury, fielded 15) with the aim of providing more evenly-matched contests. Two further brief matches were played to fill the allotted time after a scheduled match finished early. As none of the matches were 11-a-side they are not considered to have been first-class.

== The team ==
- Billy Murdoch (captain)
- George Alexander
- Jack Blackham
- Harry Boyle
- Tom Groube
- Affie Jarvis
- Percy McDonnell
- William Moule
- Joey Palmer
- Jim Slight
- Fred Spofforth
- William Tobin
- J. White

Only Murdoch, Blackham, Boyle and Spofforth had toured New Zealand with the Australians in 1877-78.

George Bonnor was unable to tour owing to a leg injury, and Alick Bannerman forwent the tour to be with his sick mother and sister in Sydney. Moule missed the early matches owing to a hand injury he incurred in Hobart on the way over.

Tobin played only four matches. White was a young player from the East Melbourne club who went on the tour as permanent twelfth man, but owing to injuries to the other players he ended up playing in eight matches. He batted last in all of them, never reached double figures, and did not bowl.

== The matches ==
- Southland v Australians, the cricket ground, Invercargill, 17, 18 January 1881. Southland XXII 43 and 74; Australians 200. Australians won by an innings and 83 runs.

Despite arriving in Bluff from Australia on the morning of the match, the Australians were in good form. Spofforth (10 for 19) and Palmer (9 for 21) dispatched Southland in the first innings, and Boyle (11 for 45) and Alexander (7 for 25) in the second. Murdoch was the Australians' highest scorer with 40; no Southland player exceeded 15.

As with the 1877–78 match, the newspapers referred to the local team as Invercargill, not Southland.

- Otago v Australians, Caledonian Ground, Dunedin, 20, 21, 22 January 1881. Australians 112 and 105; Otago XXII 83 and 90. Australians won by 44 runs.

Hugh MacNeil, who had made the highest score by either side with 28 when the Australians played Otago in 1877–78, repeated the feat this time with 44 in the second innings, and added 5 for 28 with the ball in the Australians' first innings. He received a trophy valued at ten guineas. Murdoch was the Australians' top scorer with 25 in the first innings. Spofforth and Palmer bowled unchanged, Spofforth taking 8 for 47 and 8 for 37, Palmer 12 for 33 and 11 for 39. The Australians scored slowly: just under one run per four-ball over.

- Oamaru v Australians, Northern Ground, Oamaru, 24, 25 January 1881. Oamaru XXII 54 and 88; Australians 118 and 18 for 0. Drawn.

The Australians' train from Dunedin was delayed on the morning of the match, and consequently play did not begin that day until a quarter to two. Groube was the highest scorer on either side with 30. Again Spofforth and Palmer did all the Australians' bowling, Spofforth taking 13 for 13 and 7 for 39, Palmer 7 for 28 and 11 for 35. Rain interrupted play on the second day, depriving the Australians of the chance of victory.

- South Canterbury v Australians, South Canterbury Athletic Club Ground, Timaru, 26, 27 January 1881. Australians 218; South Canterbury XXII 43 and 67. Australians won by an innings and 108 runs.

The Australians arrived by train from Oamaru in the morning, and play began at one o'clock. The first day was declared a half-holiday in Timaru. Boyle top-scored for the Australians with 48. Spofforth took 11 for 11 in the first innings, including the first four wickets before South Canterbury had scored; Boyle took 11 for 37 in the second.

- Canterbury v Australians, Hagley Oval, Christchurch, 29, 30, 31 January 1881. Canterbury XV 90 and 133; Australians 323. Australians won by an innings and 100 runs.

Canterbury had inflicted the only defeat on the 1877–78 Australians. This time, when Canterbury were dismissed for 90 in their first innings, Murdoch wagered he would beat their total on his own; he made 111. Five other Australian batsmen made between 31 and 48. Henry Secretan was Canterbury's top-scorer with 30 not out in the first innings, batting at number six. Spofforth (12 wickets) and Palmer (14) did all the Australian bowling, sending down 141.3 four-ball overs between them. A fill-in match was played afterwards, in which the Australians made 65 for 3 and the Canterbury XV did not bat.

- Wellington v Australians, Basin Reserve, Wellington, 5, 7 February 1881. Wellington XXII 82 and 68; Australians 171. Australians won by an innings and 21 runs.

Again Spofforth and Palmer did all the bowling, this time sending down 117 overs. Slight was the match's top-scorer with 40; James Blacklock was Wellington's best, with 26 in the second innings. The scoring was slow: 321 runs off 267 four-ball overs. A fill-in match was played afterwards, in which a Wellington XII made 18 all out and the Australians replied in the time available with 8 for 0.

- Nelson v Australians, Victory Square, Nelson, 9, 10 February 1881. Nelson XXII 83 and 77; Australians 72. Drawn.

Gales in Cook Strait delayed the Australians' arrival in Nelson, and the match did not start until two o'clock on the first day. Samuel Fowler, the Nelson opener, made 30 in the first innings; no one else on either side exceeded 16.

- Wanganui v Australians, Racecourse Ground, Wanganui, 11, 12 February 1881. Australians 49 and 83; Wanganui XXII 48 and 86 for 11. Wanganui won by 10 wickets.

Blackham was injured, and the Australians played with only ten men; they were allowed a substitute to make up 11 in the field. The pitch was hard and bumpy, and the Wanganui selectors had made sure they selected the district's best fieldsmen. With 22 of them on the field at once, "their numbers and agility were too much for the Australians". Wanganui also had William Barton, who was considered the best batsman in New Zealand at the time; he scored 44 of the 85 runs Wanganui required to win.

- Hawke's Bay v Australians, Nelson Cricket Ground, Hastings, 16, 17, 18 February 1881. Hawke's Bay XXII 79 and 74; Australians 154. Australians won by an innings and one run.

McDonnell was easily the top scorer in the match with 66. Hawke's Bay's 153 runs included 42 extras. The Australians played only ten men, as Blackham was unavailable; the locals gave them a substitute fieldsman.

- Auckland v Australians, Auckland Domain, Auckland, 22, 23 February 1881. Australians 144 and 117; Auckland XXII 90 and 7 for 5. Drawn.

Dan Lynch, who had taken 5 for 67 against the 1877-78 Australians, this time took 7 for 46 in the second innings. Slight made 51; no one else in the match exceeded 30. Palmer took 16 for 35 in the match.

== Leading players ==
Spofforth took 148 wickets and Palmer 141. Murdoch was the top scorer and had the best average: 317 runs at 24.5. Slight made 212 runs, Boyle 203, and Spofforth 202.

Hugh MacNeil's 44 for Otago and William Barton's 44 for Wanganui were the highest scores made against the Australians on their two tours of New Zealand.
