= Victory Square, Nelson =

Park in Nelson, New Zealand

Coordinates: 41°16′50.63″S 173°16′16.42″E

Victory Square
Ground information
- Location: Nelson, New Zealand
- Establishment: 1859 (first recorded match)

Team information
| Nelson | (1875–1886) |
- As of 22 January 2021; Source: Ground profile

Victory Square is a public park in Nelson, New Zealand, bounded by Vanguard, Toi Toi, St Vincent and Northesk streets. Located a short distance south-west of Nelson's central business district, it is used as a sports ground, public meeting place and general recreation area.

== Cricket ground ==
The cricket ground in Victory Square was being used for cricket as early as the 1858-59 season, when clubs from Nelson and the nearby town of Wakefield played each other there. The first interprovincial match there was in 1862-63, when Nelson played Wellington in a one-day match in which 40 wickets fell for 167 runs on a "very fiery pitch".

=== First-class matches ===
Between 1875 and 1886 Nelson played six matches at Victory Square that are now recognised as first-class. Nelson won all five matches against Wellington and lost the other match to Auckland. Scores were extremely low and there were some notable bowling figures.

==== 1874-75 ====
- Wellington 93 and 71 lost to Nelson 100 and 65 for 8 by two wickets.

Harry Hole took 8 for 37 and 2 for 24 for Nelson in his only first-class match. Thomas Armitage of Wellington, also playing in his first first-class match, took 5 for 18 and 4 for 24. The highest score was 31, made by two Wellington batsmen in the first innings.

==== 1876-77 ====
- Nelson 96 and 42 beat Wellington 37 and 60 by 41 runs.

The Eden brothers were the main destroyers for Nelson: William Eden took 5 for 17 and 4 for 24, Thomas Eden took 3 for 17 and 3 for 28. The highest individual score was 22.

==== 1879-80 ====
- Nelson 49 and 82 beat Wellington 51 and 29 by 51 runs.

James Wigzell of Nelson had the best figures, with 3 for 9 in the first innings and five wickets in the second, when the number of runs he conceded out of the 24 scored by the batsmen is unknown. The highest individual score was 29.

==== 1881-82 ====
- Wellington 62 and 59 lost to Nelson 105 and 17 for one by nine wickets.

Thomas Eden took 4 for 9 and 5 for 20 for Nelson. The highest individual score was 27.

==== 1882-83 ====
- Auckland 89 and 98 beat Nelson 33 and 150 by four runs.

William Lankham took 6 for 18 and 4 for 37 for Auckland. For Nelson, George Fowler took 2 for 38 and 6 for 42, and James Wigzell 5 for 16 and 4 for 16. The highest individual score was 30, by the Nelson number 11, George Silcock, in the second innings, when the last wicket added 50.

==== 1885-86 ====
- Wellington 36 and 19 lost to Nelson 101 by an innings and 46 runs.

Andrew Percy Bennett, on his first-class debut, took 6 for 13 and 6 for 5 for Nelson. Edward Boddington of Nelson made 36, and Herbert Kissling made 33.

A first-class match between Nelson and Wellington in December 1887, previously thought to have been at Victory Square, was actually held at a temporary ground in Weka Street, Nelson.

=== Statistics ===
In the six matches 1544 runs were scored for the loss of 219 wickets, an overall average of 7.05. The highest team total was Nelson's 150 in 1882-83. Of the 23 innings, only four reached 100, all by Nelson.

Edward Boddington of Nelson made the highest individual score, 36, in 1885-86. On only five occasions did a batsman reach 30. The best bowling figures in an innings were Harry Hole's 8 for 37 for Nelson in the first match, and the best match figures were Andrew Percy Bennett's 12 for 18 for Nelson in 1885-86.

== Current status ==
Victory Square was superseded as Nelson's main cricket ground with the opening of Trafalgar Park in 1888. However, it has remained a hub for local sport, with volleyball, cricket, soccer and athletic events held regularly. It is the home ground of the Wakatu Cricket Club.

== Football ==
The Nelson Football Association (NFA) played its representative matches at Victory Square throughout the 20th century. The clubs of the NFA also played inter-region Chatham Cup matches at the ground from the 1920s to the 1970s.

== Race Unity Day ==
Every March since 2009, Race Unity Day has celebrated Nelson's diverse cultures with a festival at Victory Square featuring dance, food and music.
