= Sleight (disambiguation) =

Sleight is a 2016 American science fiction drama film.

Sleight may refer to:

- Brinley D. Sleight (1835–1913), American newspaper editor and politician
- George Sleight (1853–1921), English trawler owner
- Karl J. Sleight (born 1962), US attorney
- Rebecca Sleight (born 1974), English singer who performs under the stage name Berri

== See also ==
- Sleight of hand, referring to fine motor skills used by magicians and others
- Slight (disambiguation)
