= Insult (disambiguation) =

An insult is an expression, statement, or behavior, which is disrespectful or scornful.

Insult may also refer to:

- The Insult (novel) (1996 novel), a crime novel by Rupert Thomson
- Insult (film), a 1932 British drama film
- The Insult (film), 2017 Lebanese drama film directed by Ziad Doueiri. Also known as Qadiyya raqm 23 in Arabic
- Insult (legal), the legal meaning of insult
- Insult (medical), the cause of mental or physical injury

== See also ==
- Insult slap, a challenge issued through a slap
- Insult comedy, a genre of comedy
- Injury
- Humiliation
- Slight (disambiguation)
