= Henry Halliday (disambiguation) =

Henry Halliday (1945–2022) was a British physician.

Henry Halliday or Haliday may also refer to:

- Henry Halliday Sparling (1860–1924), British journalist and socialist activist
- Alexander Henry Haliday (1806–1870), Irish entomologist
- Alexander Henry Haliday (physician) (c. 1728 – 1802), Irish physician and politician

== See also ==
- Harry Halliday – multiple cricket players
- Henry Holiday (1839–1927), English Victorian painter
