= Edward Boddington =

New Zealand cricketer

Personal information
- Full name: Edward Robert Boddington
- Born: 29 April 1862; Wakefield, New Zealand
- Died: 4 March 1897 (aged 34); Perth, Western Australia
- Relatives: Henry Boddington (brother)

Domestic team information
- Years: Team
- 1881/82–1885/86: Nelson
- 1887/88: Wellington

Career statistics
Competition	First-class
Matches	6
Runs scored	98
Batting average	14.00
100s/50s	0/0
Top score	47 not out
Balls bowled	41
Wickets	2
Bowling average	10.50
5 wickets in innings	0
10 wickets in match	0
Best bowling	1/4
Catches/stumpings	2/–
- Source: Cricinfo, 19 January 2018

Edward Robert Boddington (29 April 1862 – 4 March 1897) was a cricketer who played first-class cricket in New Zealand from 1880 to 1888.

In the seven low-scoring first-class matches played at Victory Square, Nelson, Boddington hit the highest individual score, 36, for Nelson against Wellington in March 1886, when Nelson made only 101 yet won by an innings and 46 runs.

Boddington was educated at Nelson College from 1877 to 1878, and joined the Union Bank of Australia, for whom he worked in Nelson, Wellington and Dunedin before moving to the Perth branch in 1895. He died suddenly in Perth, three months after winning the Western Australian tennis championship. He was also a prominent golfer, cyclist and athlete.
