= Richard Canney =

English-born cricketer and medical doctor (1852 – 1887)

Richard Bright Canney (July 1852 – 17 June 1887) was an English-born cricketer and medical doctor who practised in New Zealand and Australia.

Born in Thanet in Kent, Canney studied medicine in Chipping Sodbury under the tutelage of Alfred Grace, a brother of W. G. Grace and one of the Grace family of cricketers and doctors. He arrived in New Zealand in January 1878. While working as a general practitioner in Wakefield, near Nelson, Canney was selected to captain the Nelson cricket team in its annual first-class match against Wellington in April 1878. He won the toss and, batting in the middle order, scored 7 and 15 – above-average scores in a match in which 40 wickets fell for 297 runs – and Nelson won by 85 runs. It was his only first-class cricket match.

Canney moved to Australia in the early 1880s and practised in Scone and then in Gunnedah, where he was highly regarded for his work among the poorer citizens. He faced insolvency proceedings in 1884. He married Ellen Sarah Rigney in Walcha in 1885.

In March 1887, after Canney had unsuccessfully operated on a 15-year-old girl at Breeza and she died, he was charged with malpractice. However, the jury not only cleared Canney of malpractice, but in fact commended him for his actions, "when he knew there was no likelihood of ever being recompensed for his trouble".

On Thursday, 16 June 1887, Canney was thrown from his horse in Conadilly Street, Gunnedah, and suffered a fractured skull. He died of his injuries early the next morning.
