= Harry Hole (cricketer) =

Personal information
- Full name: Henry Whitworth Hole
- Born: 10 December 1855; Woolsey, near Crediton, Devon, England
- Died: 23 June 1942 (aged 86); Wanganui, New Zealand

Domestic team information
- Years: Team
- 1874/75: Nelson

Career statistics
Competition	First-class
Matches	1
Runs scored	10
Batting average	5.00
100s/50s	0/0
Top score	6
Balls bowled	144
Wickets	10
Bowling average	6.10
5 wickets in innings	1
10 wickets in match	1
Best bowling	8/37
Catches/stumpings	0/–
- Source: Cricinfo, 19 August 2017

Henry Whitworth Hole (10 December 1855 – 23 June 1942) was a New Zealand cricketer who took 10 wickets on the first day of his only first-class match.

== Life and career ==
Born in England, Harry Hole went to New Zealand as a young man and learned farming in the Marlborough region.

At the age of 19, Hole was one of 10 players, five on each team, who were making their first-class debuts in the match between Nelson and Wellington at Victory Square, Nelson, in February 1875. Wellington batted first, and Hole opened the bowling for Nelson. He bowled throughout the innings, taking 8 for 37 off 18 overs as Wellington were dismissed for 93. Nelson went in and made 100. Wellington batted again and were 40 for 5 at stumps on the first day. Hole again opened the bowling, and took the first two wickets but, "somewhat tired by his exertions", delivered only six overs before being relieved. He did not bowl again in the match. On the second day Nelson dismissed Wellington for 71 and then made 65 for eight to win by two wickets. Hole is one of the six players in the history of first-class cricket to take 10 or more wickets in his only match.

Hole moved to the North Island, where he ran hotels and general stores in Taupō and then Kerioi in the Wanganui area. He married Maggie Taylor in Wanganui on 23 December 1890. He entered the brewing business as a brewery manager in 1890 and became a partner with Hope Gibbons in the Wanganui Brewery in 1895.

In 1900 he lent his rural property at Tayforth, west of Wanganui, to the armed forces for several days of manoeuvres. About 1400 troops were involved. By 1904 he had moved to a property north of Upokongaro on the Whanganui River, where he farmed sheep.

Hole also played football and lawn bowls. In 1938, aged 83, he was "the second oldest bowler in Wanganui".

After living in Wanganui for 61 years, Hole died there in June 1942, aged 86. His wife predeceased him; he was survived by a son and a daughter.
