= Charles Knapp =

Charles Knapp may refer to:

- Charles Knapp (cricketer) (1845-1927), New Zealand cricketer
- Charles Knapp (scholar) (1868–1936), classical American scholar
- Charles Knapp (congressman) (1797–1880), member of the United States House of Representatives from New York
- Charles J. Knapp (1845–1916), his son, member of the United States House of Representatives from New York
- Charles Boynton Knapp (born 1946), president of the University of Georgia
- Charles L. Knapp (1847–1929), member of the United States House of Representatives from New York
