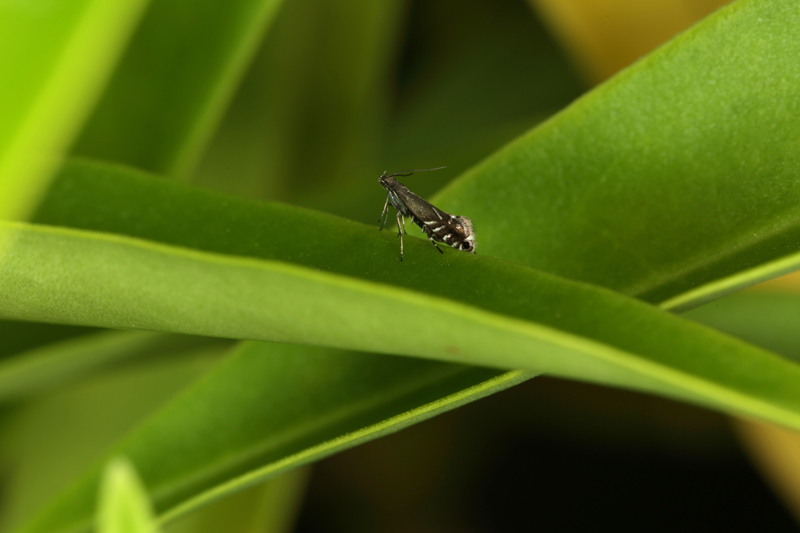

Scientific classification
- Kingdom: Animalia
- Phylum: Arthropoda
- Clade: Pancrustacea
- Class: Insecta
- Order: Lepidoptera
- Family: Glyphipterigidae
- Genus: Glyphipterix
- Species: G. morangella

Binomial name
- Glyphipterix morangella C. Felder & Rogenhofer, 1875

= Glyphipterix morangella =

Species of moth

Glyphipterix morangella is a species of sedge moth in the genus Glyphipterix. It is endemic to New Zealand. This is a small moth with a wingspan of 0.7mm. It has been observed in the Nelson and Tasman districts, at the Poor Knights Islands and on Chatham Island. The larvae of this species likely feed on monocots and adults are day flying. They are on the wing in November.

== Taxonomy ==
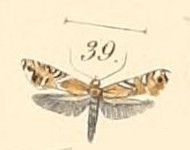
Illustration of G. morangella in its original description.

This species was first described by Cajetan Felder and Alois Friedrich Rogenhofer in 1875. In 1915 Edward Meyrick synonymised this species with Glyphipterix transversella. In 1928, in his book The butterflies and moths of New Zealand, George Hudson followed Meyrick and discussed this species as a synonym of G. transversella. In 1988 John S. Dugdale disagreed with Meyrick's synonymisation and discussed this moth under its original name. The male holotype, collected by T. R. Oxley in Nelson, is held at the Natural History Museum, London.

== Description ==
G. morangella is a small moth with a wingspan of 7.0 mm.

== Distribution ==
This species is endemic to New Zealand. It has been observed in its type locality of Nelson, the Tasman District notably by Alfred Philpott at the Golden Downs, and at Aorangi Island in the Poor Knights Islands in Northland. This species has also been observed on Chatham Island.

== Behaviour ==
Adults of this species have been observed on the wing in November. This species, like all members of this genus, is day flying.

== Hosts ==
Larvae of this species likely feed on the pith inside the stems of monocots.
