= Double nelson =

Double nelson may refer to:

- A score of 222 runs, or two Nelsons in cricket
- Full nelson in wrestling
