= Slight =

Slight or slights may refer to:

- A snub or an insult, an intentional discourtesy
- Slighting, the deliberate destruction of a fortification to reduce its value

== Arts and entertainment ==
- Slights (novel) (2009), a horror novel by Kaaron Warren
- "Slight", a song from the 2002 hip hop album Circle by Boom Bip and Doseone

== People ==
- Aaron Slight (born 1966), former professional motorcycle road racer
- Alexander Slight (1861–1930), Australian cricketer
- Chris Slight, Video game show host
- George Henry Slight (1859–1934), Scottish engineer
- Jim Slight (1855–1930), Australian cricketer
- John Slight, Scottish lawn bowler
- William Slight (1858–1941), Australian cricketer

== Other ==
- Slights, Michigan, a ghost town in Blair Township, Grand Traverse County

== See also ==
- Sleight (disambiguation)
- Slite, a locality in Sweden
