= Samuel Fowler (cricketer) =

New Zealand cricketer

Personal information
- Born: 18 August 1854; Waimea, Nelson, New Zealand
- Died: 13 July 1915 (aged 60); Riwaka, New Zealand
- Batting: Left-handed
- Relatives: Louis Fowler (brother); George Fowler (brother)

Domestic team information
- Years: Team
- 1873/74–1883/84: Nelson

Career statistics
Competition	First-class
Matches	10
Runs scored	186
Batting average	10.94
100s/50s	0/0
Top score	28*
Balls bowled	287
Wickets	13
Bowling average	5.53
5 wickets in innings	1
10 wickets in match	0
Best bowling	5/14
Catches/stumpings	3/–
- Source: CricketArchive, 3 May 2019

Samuel Fowler (18 August 1854 – 13 July 1915) was a New Zealand cricketer who played first-class cricket for Nelson from 1874 to 1884. His brothers Louis and George also played for Nelson.

== Career ==
In April 1878, in a first-class match against Wellington in which 40 wickets fell for 297 runs, Fowler made the highest score on either side of 28 not out and 15. Nelson won by 85 runs. In December 1880 he took 5 for 14 in Wellington's first innings in a drawn match. In the match Nelson played against the touring Australians in February 1881, Fowler opened the batting and scored 30 in the first innings; in the whole match no one else on either side exceeded 16. Nelson led the Australians by 11 runs on the first innings in the drawn match.

== Personal life and death ==
Fowler lived in Riwaka, near Motueka, where he died in July 1915, leaving a widow and family.
