= Balmain =

Balmain may refer to:

== Places ==
- Balmain, New South Wales, a suburb of Sydney, Australia
- Electoral district of Balmain, an electoral division in New South Wales, Australia
- Balmain East, New South Wales, a suburb of Sydney, Australia
- Balmain House and country estate in Aberdeenshire, Scotland

== People with the surname ==
- Allan Balmain, Distinguished Professor of Cancer Genetics at the University of California, San Francisco (UCSF)
- Louis Balmain (1858–1904), New Zealand cricketer
- Pierre Balmain (1914–1982), French fashion designer
- William Balmain (1762–1803), Scottish-born surgeon at the first European settlement in Sydney

== Other ==
- Balmain bug, a crustacean, slipper lobster
- Balmain (fashion house), founded by Pierre Balmain
- Balmain Colliery, a former coal mine in Birchgrove, New South Wales
