= Joseph Adcock =

English cleric (1864–1914)

Personal information
- Full name: Joseph Mould Adcock
- Born: 10 March 1864; Tamworth, Staffordshire, England
- Died: 24 January 1914 (aged 49); Willesborough, Kent, England

Domestic team information
- Years: Team
- 1891-92: Nelson

Career statistics
Competition	First class
Matches	1
Runs scored	23
Batting average	11.50
100s/50s	0/0
Top score	20
Balls bowled	18
Wickets	0
Bowling average	–
5 wickets in innings	0
10 wickets in match	0
Best bowling	–
Catches/stumpings	0/0
- Source: , 14 October 2016

Joseph Mould Adcock (10 March 1864 – 24 January 1914) was an English-born cricketer who played one match of first-class cricket for Nelson in New Zealand in 1891. He also represented South Canterbury against touring cricket teams in 1903 and 1906.

Adcock was an Anglican clergyman. He was ordained as a deacon in 1890 and as a priest in 1892. He served as domestic chaplain to the Bishop of Nelson, and was the curate at Brightwater, then Motueka. He returned to England to study at St Catharine's College, Cambridge, graduating MA in 1903. He returned to New Zealand, serving at Timaru and Temuka. In 1910 he again returned to England, where he was rector of Willesborough from 1911 until his death in 1914. He died after contracting typhoid fever in Switzerland.
