= Harry Halliday =

Harry Halliday may refer to:

- Harry Halliday (cricketer, born 1920), English cricketer
- Harry Halliday (cricketer, born 1855), New Zealand cricketer
