= St John's Church, Wakefield =

Church near Nelson, New Zealand

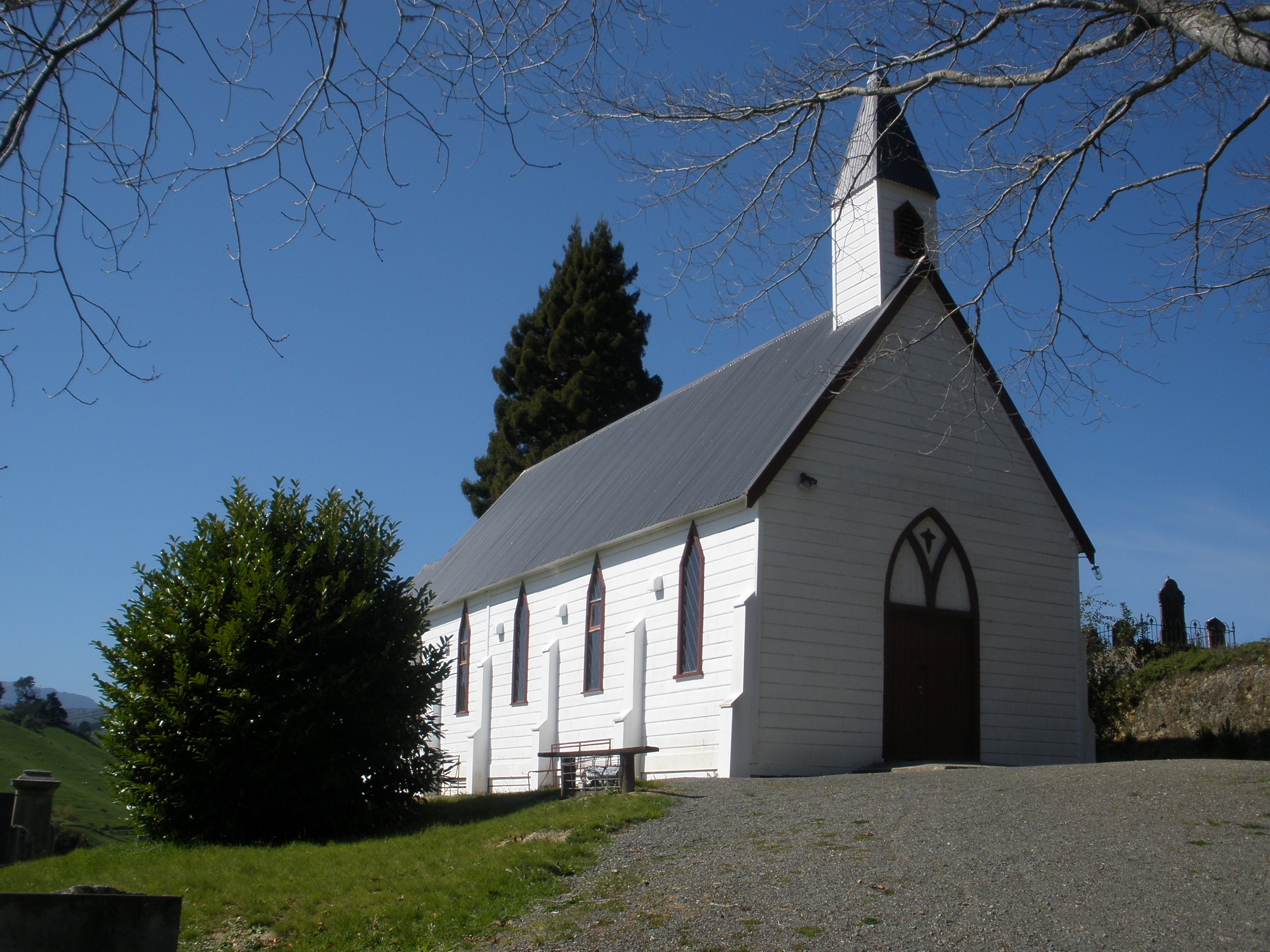
- St John's Church, Wakefield
- 41°24′36.086″S 173°2′51.860″E
- Location: 130 Edward Street, Wakefield
- Country: New Zealand
- Denomination: Anglican

Architecture
- Functional status: Active
- Architect: Marianne Reay
- Architectural type: Church
- Style: Gothic Revival
- Years built: 1846

Administration
- Province: Anglican Church in Aotearoa, New Zealand and Polynesia
- Diocese: Nelson
- Parish: Golden Bay

Heritage New Zealand – Category 1
- Official name: St John's Church (Anglican)
- Designated: 23 June 1983
- Reference no.: 40

St John's Church is a heritage-listed Anglican church at Wakefield, near Nelson in New Zealand's South Island. Built in 1846, it is the oldest surviving church in the South Island and second oldest surviving church in the country. It is also notable for being the first known building in New Zealand to be designed by a woman.

== Background ==
The area of Waimea South, to the southwest of Nelson, was settled by workers from the New Zealand Company in 1843, basing themselves on sections of bush that supported their families while the men constructed roads in the area. It was a physically demanding lifestyle but at Wakefield, a school was soon established and the community worked towards gathering materials and money for a church. Then, in late 1845, the Bishop of New Zealand, George Selwyn, visited Nelson and donated funds for churches to be built at nearby Motueka, Riwaka and Wakefield. He was impressed by a chapel built at Te Henui in New Plymouth on his visit there, and desired similar buildings to be built around Nelson.

== History ==
A prominent settler in the area, Edward Baigent, had established a saw mill and he donated timber for the use of the church. He also erected the frames of the building and supervised its construction, with the community providing the manual labour. The church was located on land donated by the New Zealand Company and, according to Baigent's memoirs, it was designed by Marianne Reay, the wife of Reverend Charles Lucas Reay, a minister resident at Nelson. However, it is possible that the Nelson-based draughtsman Charles Heaphy, employed by the New Zealand Company, was responsible for the work.

Sited on a hill, St John’s Church was designed with a gabled nave, chancel and a bell tower with louvred window and topped with a four-sided spire with a cross at its peak. A second cross was mounted to the far end of the roof of the nave. The building was constructed from tōtara timber, clad on the exterior with weatherboard with the interior lined with kahikatea wood. Orientated along a west-east axis, the northern and southern walls were provided with three lancet windows. Painted white, the weatherboards were planed and worked to resemble blocks. The church was completed in late 1846 although Reverend Reay had held a service in the building on 11 October, before it was finished.

The building has undergone a number of additions and improvements, beginning in 1865 when the building was lengthened by 15 feet (4.6 m) and its foundations reworked. The chancel was moved eastwards while the original kahikatea timber lining the interior may have been replaced with kauri. Five years later a vestry was added. In 1880, the original wooden shingles were replaced with iron. The chancel was again modified in 1887, by being increased in length by 10 feet (3.0 m). Strengthening work was performed on the ceiling in 1892, with iron ties being added. At this time, the ceiling was also lined. Another increase in the size of the church was made in 1902, when the vestry was enlarged. A major overhaul of the church was completed in 1995 when it was re-piled and some timber buttresses, which were in poor condition, were replaced. The following year a sprinkler system was installed.

The church lacked a parish priest for a number of years, with Reverend Reay initially travelling from Nelson to carry out services. Bishop Selwyn conducted a service at Easter in 1848. A minister for St. John's Church was finally appointed in 1858. It has remained in use throughout its history, and as of 2021, was the longest continuous serving church in New Zealand. In its churchyard, many of the area's settlers are buried. These include Baigent and his wife.

== Legacy ==
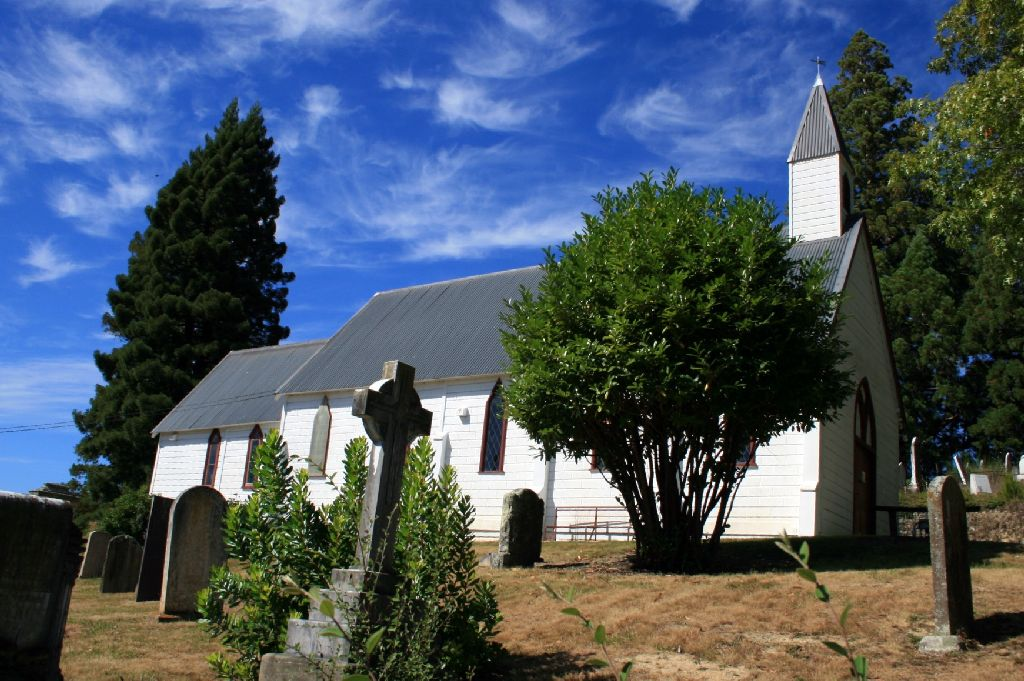
A view of St John's Church and its graveyard

St John's Church is the oldest surviving church in the South Island, and the second oldest surviving church in New Zealand. Located at 130 Edward Street in Wakefield, its age and history of being in continual use as a parish since its construction, as well as its relatively original state and connections to the regional colonial settlers, was a factor in Heritage New Zealand listing St John's Church as a Historic Place Category 1 on 23 June 1983, with a list number of 40. It is also notable for being the first known example of New Zealand architecture designed by a woman.

A plaque on the main gateway to the church to recognise St John's Church's status as the South Island's oldest church was unveiled in October 1984, on the 138th anniversary of the first service in the building.
