= Marianne Reay =

Marianne Draper Reay (née Cook; c. 1804 – unknown) was an English-born early New Zealand settler. She designed St John's Church in 1846 which is considered the earliest building in colonial New Zealand designed by a woman.

== Biography ==
Reay was born in c. 1804 in Cambridge, England. She married a Royal Navy lieutenant who died at sea. In 1834, she remarried, to Reverend Charles Lucas Reay. In 1841 Reay's husband volunteered for the Church Missionary Society and travelled to New Zealand with Bishop Selwyn and other Anglican clergy and their families, arriving in 1842.

The settlement of Nelson had been founded that year by the New Zealand Company, and Reay's husband was appointed minister for the town. Reay, the couple's son, and Reay's daughter from her first marriage arrived in Nelson the following year, 1843. In 1846, Reay designed St John's Church for the community at Wakefield. Edward Baigent, a local sawmiller, donated the timber and oversaw the construction of the church. The first service in the church was held on 11 October 1846.

In 1847 the Missionary Society moved the family to a mission station at Rangitukia on the East Cape. Reay's husband died there suddenly in 1848. Reay and her son went to Auckland to stay with Reay's daughter and then returned to England. It is not known when or where Reay died.
