= Tom Groube =

Australian cricketer

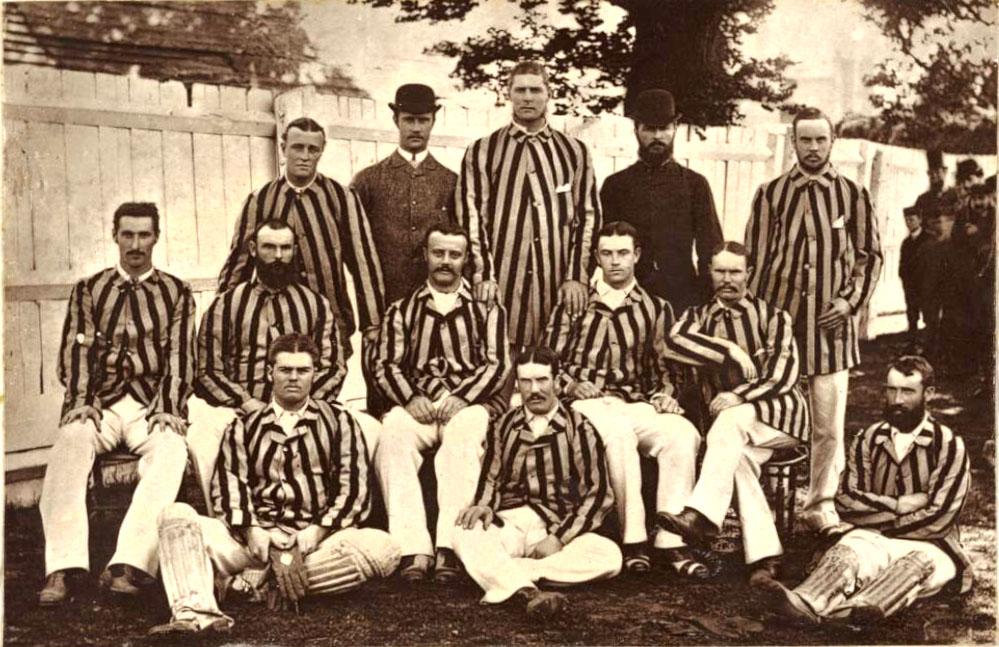
- The Australians in 1880. Tom Groube is standing at the far right.

Personal information
- Full name: Thomas Underwood Groube
- Born: 2 September 1857; New Plymouth, Taranaki, New Zealand
- Died: 5 August 1927 (aged 69); Melbourne, Australia
- Height: 5 ft 11 in (1.80 m)
- Batting: Right-handed
- Bowling: Right-arm medium-pace

International information
- National side: Australia
- Only Test (cap 20): 6 September 1880 v England

Domestic team information
- Years: Team
- 1878-79 to 1881-82: Victoria

Career statistics
Competition	Tests	First-class
Matches	1	13
Runs scored	11	179
Batting average	5.50	8.52
100s/50s	0/0	0/1
Top score	11	61
Balls bowled	0	0
Wickets	0	0
Bowling average	–	–
5 wickets in innings	0	0
10 wickets in match	0	0
Best bowling	–	–
Catches/stumpings	0/0	2/0
- Source: Cricinfo, 28 November 2023

Thomas Underwood Groube (2 September 1857 – 5 August 1927) was an Australian cricketer who played in one Test in 1880. He was the first New Zealand-born Test cricketer.

== Life and career ==
Groube's father was Horatio Groube, a Congregational minister who was among the first white settlers in New Plymouth, where Tom was born. The family left New Zealand in the early 1860s as a result of the Second Taranaki War and settled in Melbourne. Tom's paternal grandfather was a rear-admiral in the Royal Navy.

Five feet eleven inches tall and slimly built, Tom Groube was a successful batsman in Melbourne club cricket in the late 1870s and early 1880s. Between 1878 and 1885 he scored 2350 runs for the East Melbourne club at an average of 44. He played four matches of first-class cricket for Victoria between 1879 and 1881 but with little success. In 1878-79 he averaged 155.33 for East Melbourne, which helped him earn a place in the Australian team to England in 1880. He was a late replacement for Charles Bannerman, who had to withdraw from the selected touring team owing to illness.

Groube's highest first-class score was 61 against Yorkshire in 1880, which was the only time he reached 20 in first-class cricket. He played in the Test at The Oval in 1880, the first-ever Test match in England, but was not successful. He later toured New Zealand with the Australian team in 1880-81, his highest score there being 42 against Canterbury.

In later years Groube wrote about cricket and Australian rules football in Victoria for the Weekly Times and The Herald under the pen-names "Old Cricketer" and "Rover". He conducted the choir at the Congregational church in Hawthorn, Melbourne, for about 40 years. He was survived by his wife and their three sons.
