= Henry Secretan =

New Zealand cricketer

Personal information
- Full name: Henry Howell Secretan
- Born: 25 February 1855; Blackheath, Kent, England
- Died: 16 June 1911 (aged 56); Fendalton, Christchurch, New Zealand
- Batting: Right-handed

Domestic team information
- Years: Team
- 1876-77 to 1886-87: Canterbury

Career statistics
Competition	First-class
Matches	6
Runs scored	168
Batting average	16.80
100s/50s	0/1
Top score	72
Balls bowled	15
Wickets	0
Bowling average	–
5 wickets in innings	–
10 wickets in match	–
Best bowling	–
Catches/stumpings	6/–
- Source: Cricinfo, 30 March 2019

Henry Howell Secretan (25 February 1855 – 16 June 1911) was an English-born New Zealand cricketer who played first-class cricket for Canterbury from 1877 to 1886.

After attending Marlborough College, Secretan migrated to New Zealand in the 1870s and began working soon after his arrival for the Christchurch office of the New Zealand Loan and Mercantile Agency Company. He worked for the company in several towns in the South Island until 1894, when he helped found the Canterbury Hall Company, acting as secretary until just before his death. As well as being a prominent cricketer, he was one of the pioneers of lawn tennis in the Canterbury region.

Described as "a stylish batsman, with a fine art" and "a beautiful bat, as free as a mountain bird", in his six first-class matches Secretan made a highest score of 72, in an innings victory over Auckland in January 1885, when his teammate Frederick Wilding made 104, only the second century in New Zealand first-class cricket. In 1880-81 Secretan had scored 30 not out, Canterbury's highest score in the match, when the touring Australians beat Canterbury by an innings. The report in the Lyttelton Times said Secretan's innings "made good his claim to be the best batsman in New Zealand".

His first wife, Marion, died in September 1889, aged 29. He married Ellen Coster in July 1890. He died at his home in the Christchurch suburb of Fendalton in June 1911, aged 56.
