= William Tobin (cricketer) =

Australian cricketer

Personal information
- Born: 7 June 1859; Kensington, London, England
- Died: 17 January 1904 (aged 44); Melbourne, Australia

Domestic team information
- Years: Team
- 1880-1885: Victoria
- Source: Cricinfo, 22 July 2015

William Tobin (7 June 1859 – 17 January 1904) was an Australian cricketer. He played three first-class cricket matches for Victoria between 1880 and 1885. He toured New Zealand with the Australian team in 1880-81.

== See also ==
- List of Victoria first-class cricketers
