= Henry Boddington =

New Zealand cricketer

Personal information
- Full name: Henry Albert Boddington
- Born: 15 June 1863; Kaiapoi, New Zealand
- Died: 22 March 1938 (aged 74); Christchurch, New Zealand
- Role: Batsman
- Relatives: Edward Boddington (brother)

Domestic team information
- Years: Team
- 1880/81–1887/88: Nelson
- 1883/84–1895/96: Otago
- FC debut: 30 December 1880 Nelson v Wellington
- Last FC: 15 February 1896 Otago v Canterbury

Career statistics
Competition	First-class
Matches	12
Runs scored	257
Batting average	12.23
100s/50s	0/0
Top score	46
Balls bowled	68
Wickets	0
Bowling average	–
5 wickets in innings	–
10 wickets in match	–
Best bowling	–
Catches/stumpings	6/–
- Source: ESPNcricinfo, 21 November 2021

Henry Albert Boddington (15 June 1863 – 22 March 1938) was a New Zealand cricketer.

== Life and career ==
Boddington was educated at Nelson College from 1877 to 1880. He worked in New Zealand branches of the Bank of New South Wales for 40 years.

Boddington played first-class cricket for Nelson and Otago between 1880 and 1896. He was a batsman who made some useful scores in an era of very low scoring. His highest score was 46 in Otago's two-wicket victory over Canterbury in 1884–85. His 29, opening Nelson's first innings, was the highest score of the match when Nelson beat Wellington in 1887–88.

Boddington died at his home in the Christchurch suburb of Avonside on 22 March 1938, and was buried at Bromley Cemetery. His wife (née Rutherford) had died two years earlier. Their three daughters and three sons survived them.
