= William Slight =

Australian cricketer

Personal information
- Born: 9 September 1857; Emerald Hill, Melbourne, Colony of Victoria
- Died: 22 December 1941 (aged 83); Toorak Gardens, Adelaide, Australia
- Relatives: Jim Slight (brother)

Domestic team information
- Years: Team
- 1877: Victoria
- 1880/81-1881/82: South Australia
- Source: Cricinfo, 7 June 2015

William Slight (19 September 1857 – 22 December 1941) was an Australian cricketer who played for Victoria and South Australia. He played his one first-class cricket match for Victoria in 1877.

== See also ==
- List of Victoria first-class cricketers
