= Thomas Eden (cricketer) =

New Zealand farmer and cricketer (1855–1914)

Tom Eden
Personal information
- Full name: Thomas Gowland Eden
- Born: 9 May 1855; Nelson, New Zealand
- Died: 19 November 1914 (aged 59); Wakefield, New Zealand

Domestic team information
- Years: Team
- 1874/75–1891/92: Nelson

Career statistics
Competition	First-class
Matches	11
Runs scored	144
Batting average	8.00
100s/50s	0/0
Top score	25
Balls bowled	988
Wickets	60
Bowling average	6.36
5 wickets in innings	6
10 wickets in match	2
Best bowling	9/43
Catches/stumpings	5/–
- Source: Cricinfo, 19 March 2019

Thomas Gowland Eden (9 May 1855 – 19 November 1914) was a New Zealand cricketer and farmer who played 11 games of first-class cricket for Nelson between 1875 and 1891.

== Cricket career ==
Tom Eden was a prominent bowler in a period of low scores. In his second first-class match he took 9 for 43 and 5 for 20, as well as top-scoring in Nelson's first innings with 17 at No. 10, when Nelson beat Wellington by four wickets at the Basin Reserve in Wellington in 1875–76. He was Nelson's most successful bowler, with four wickets, when James Lillywhite's XI visited in February 1877 shortly before playing the inaugural Test match in Melbourne.

At the Basin Reserve in 1877-78 Eden took 11 wickets when Nelson beat Wellington by 85 runs. The complete bowling analyses are unavailable, but as he bowled unchanged through both innings, in which Wellington's batsmen scored only 88 runs, his match figures are likely to have been 11 for around 40 to 50. Later in his career he played as a batsman, making his highest first-class score of 25 (which was also Nelson's top score) in his last innings.

== Personal life ==
Tom Eden married Marion Hastilow on 21 July 1883 in St Paul's Church, Brightwater, south-west of Nelson. He established a hop farm at Bridge Valley, south-east of Wakefield, where he lived for the rest of his life. He died at home aged 59 after a long and painful illness.
