= Bob Thoms =

English cricketer and umpire

- Born: Robert Arthur Thoms; 19 May 1826; Marylebone, London
- Died: 10 June 1903 (aged 77); Regent's Park, London
- Occupations: Cricketer, cricket umpire
- Years active: 1850–1851, 1863–1900
- Spouse: Elizabeth Constance Farley
- Children: 4
- Cricket career

Cricket information

Umpiring information
- Tests umpired: 2 (1880–1882)

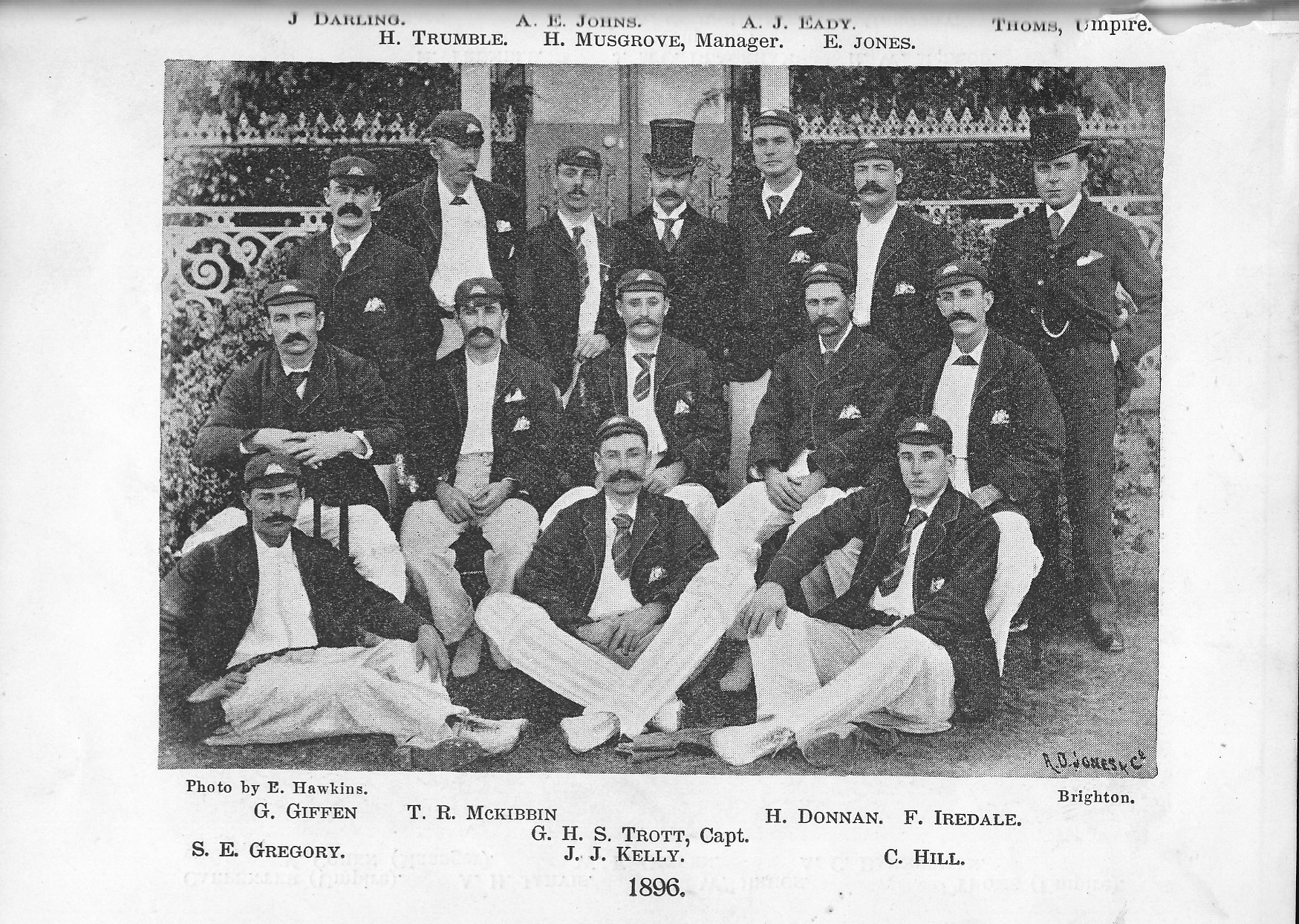
Thoms pictured back row 1st right with the Australian cricket team in England in 1896

Robert Arthur Thoms (19 May 1826 – 10 June 1903) was a cricket umpire who stood in two Test matches, the first two played in England, in 1880 and 1882.

== Life and career ==
Thoms was born in Marylebone in London in 1826. His father was part-proprietor of a cricket ground in Middlesex. Thoms attended a "good school", where he learnt Latin and Greek.

Thoms appeared as a player in three first-class cricket matches in 1850 and 1851: one for an Under 36 XI, one for Marylebone Cricket Club and Metropolitan Clubs and one for the All England Eleven. He was a fine fieldsman and an excellent sprinter over 100 yards.

Thoms' long umpiring career lasted from 1863 to 1900 and encompassed 244 first-class matches, including the first two Test matches played in England, between England and Australia at The Oval in 1880 and 1882. When he died, The Times said that he was "the most famous umpire the game has known". The Australian Test captain Joe Darling said, "Thoms was about the only umpire in England who was not afraid of Grace or anyone else." The weekly magazine Cricket said:

He was universally regarded as the umpire of the period, imperturbable, accurate and prompt in his decisions, and a great authority on the laws of the game. Unlike most umpires who, when they have given a decision, decline to argue or discuss the matter, he had a habit of explaining just what had happened, and as he very seldom made a mistake, his comments were always heard with respect and often admiration.

Thoms frequently wrote articles on cricket for the sporting press, "always having something interesting to say in quaint language, which was charming and entirely his own".

He and his wife, the former Elizabeth Constance Farley, had four children, two of whom died in infancy. She died in 1898; he died after a long illness in 1903 at Regent's Park, London. They are buried in a family grave on the eastern side of Highgate Cemetery.

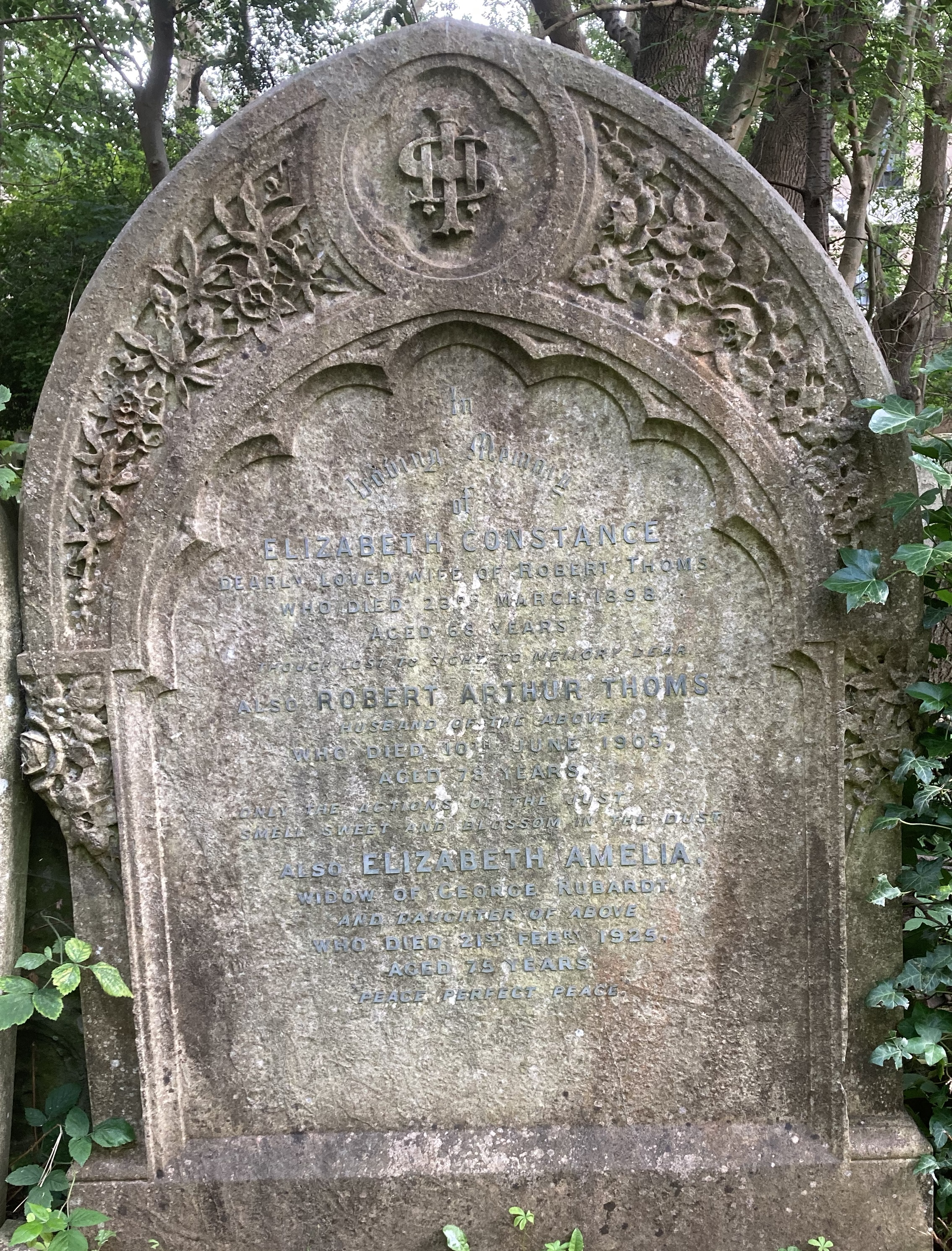
Family grave of Robert Arthur Thoms in Highgate Cemetery
