= Woodhouse Hill Ground, Leeds =

Cricket and rugby football stadium in the Hunslet district of Leeds

Coordinates: 53°46′13″N 1°31′24″W

Woodhouse Hill was a stadium in the Hunslet district of Leeds which was used for cricket and rugby football.

== History ==
In the 1860s a cricket team named "Evening Star" used to play on Hunslet Moor. Later it moved to Woodhouse Hill, the home of another cricket club, "The Peep of Day C.C.".

Woodhouse Hill was an enclosure adjacent to the Cemetery Tavern (now The Parnaby Tavern). Sometime later Evening Star changed its name to Hunslet C.C. It became an important Yorkshire club, and Australian teams played at Woodhouse Hill in 1868, 1878 and 1880.

In 1884, Hunslet built a stand. It was re-erected in Parkside when the club moved.

== Cricket ==
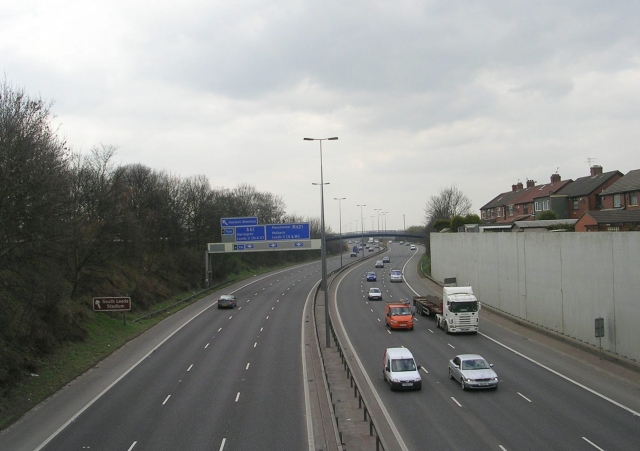
M621 motorway across the area of the former Woodhouse Hill cricket ground

Woodhouse Hill Cricket Ground held two first class cricket matches . In July 1869 Yorkshire CCC played Cambridgeshire while a United North of England Eleven took on a United South of England Eleven in 1872.

Roger Iddison scored a century in the county match but the match winner was Tom Emmett who took 9-23 and 7 for 15 for Yorkshire. His match figures of 16 for 38 in 35.2 overs in Yorkshire's innings victory are remarkable and he also scored an unbeaten 47 at number 11 in a partnership of 72 for the last wicket . Emmett's 9 for 23 were his best innings figures in a career which saw him take 1572 first class wickets at just 13.55.

The last cricket on the ground was played in 1888 and Woodhouse Hill was later lost to building development, part is now under the M621.

== Rugby ==
A special general meeting of the Hunslet Cricket Club was held on 21 May 1883, the committee resolved to grant two local teams: Albion and Excelsior the sum of £30 to form the rugby club Hunslet based at Woodhouse Hill. The name of the cricket club was also changed to 'Hunslet Cricket and Football Club'.

Hunslet announced their arrival the following season by beating Leeds St John's (later to become Leeds Rhinos) in the third round of the Yorkshire Cup. Better fixtures drew larger crowds and as a result the landlord wanted to put up the rent. The search was on for another ground, club officials purchased at little cost 10.25 acres (41,500 m^{2}) of waste land at Hunslet Carr from the Low Moor Iron and Coal Company and had to shift 2,000 tons of rubbish to create what would become Parkside, which they moved to in 1888.
