= Nelson (cricket) =

Cricketing slang for a score of 111

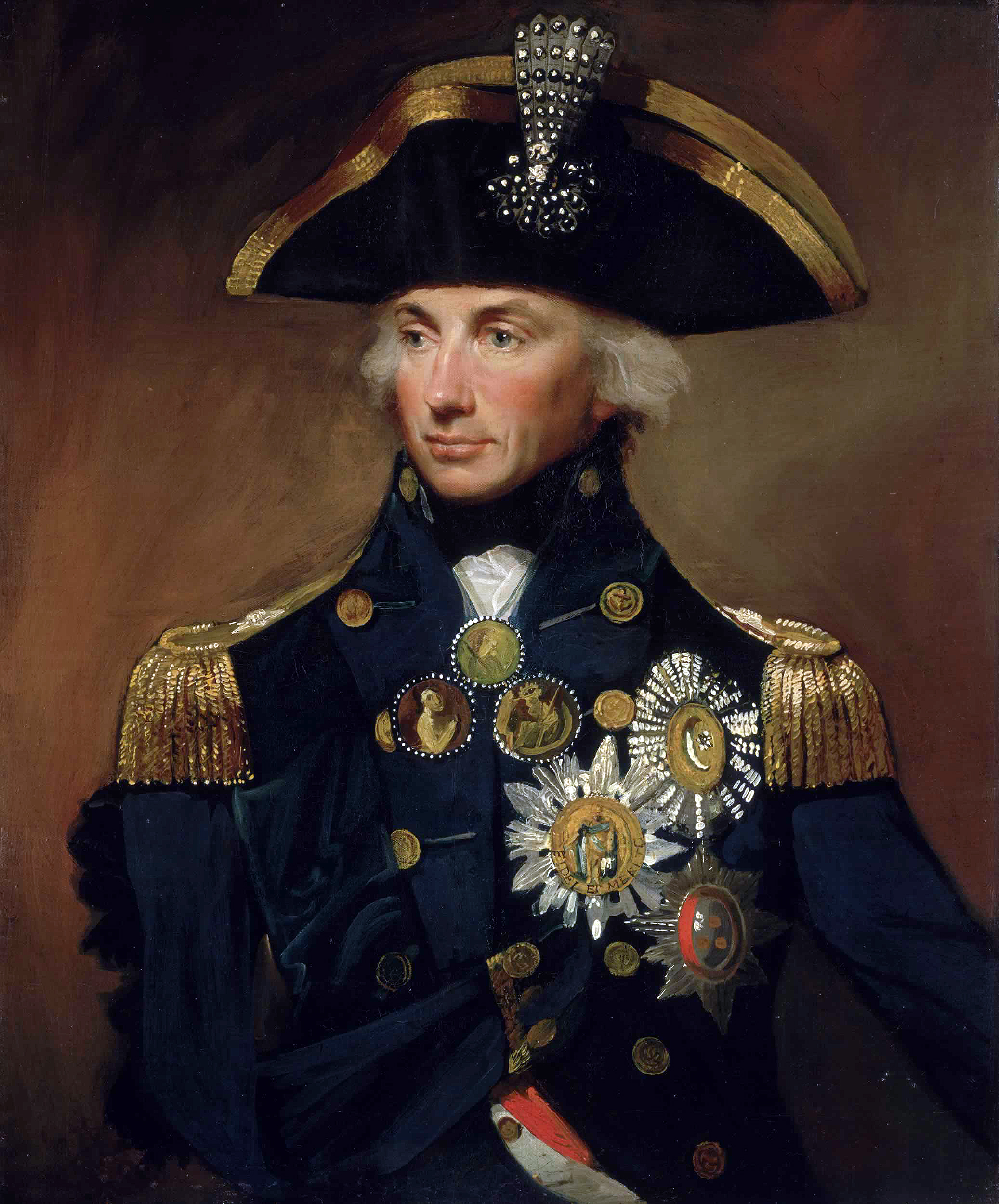
Lord Nelson, after whom the term is named

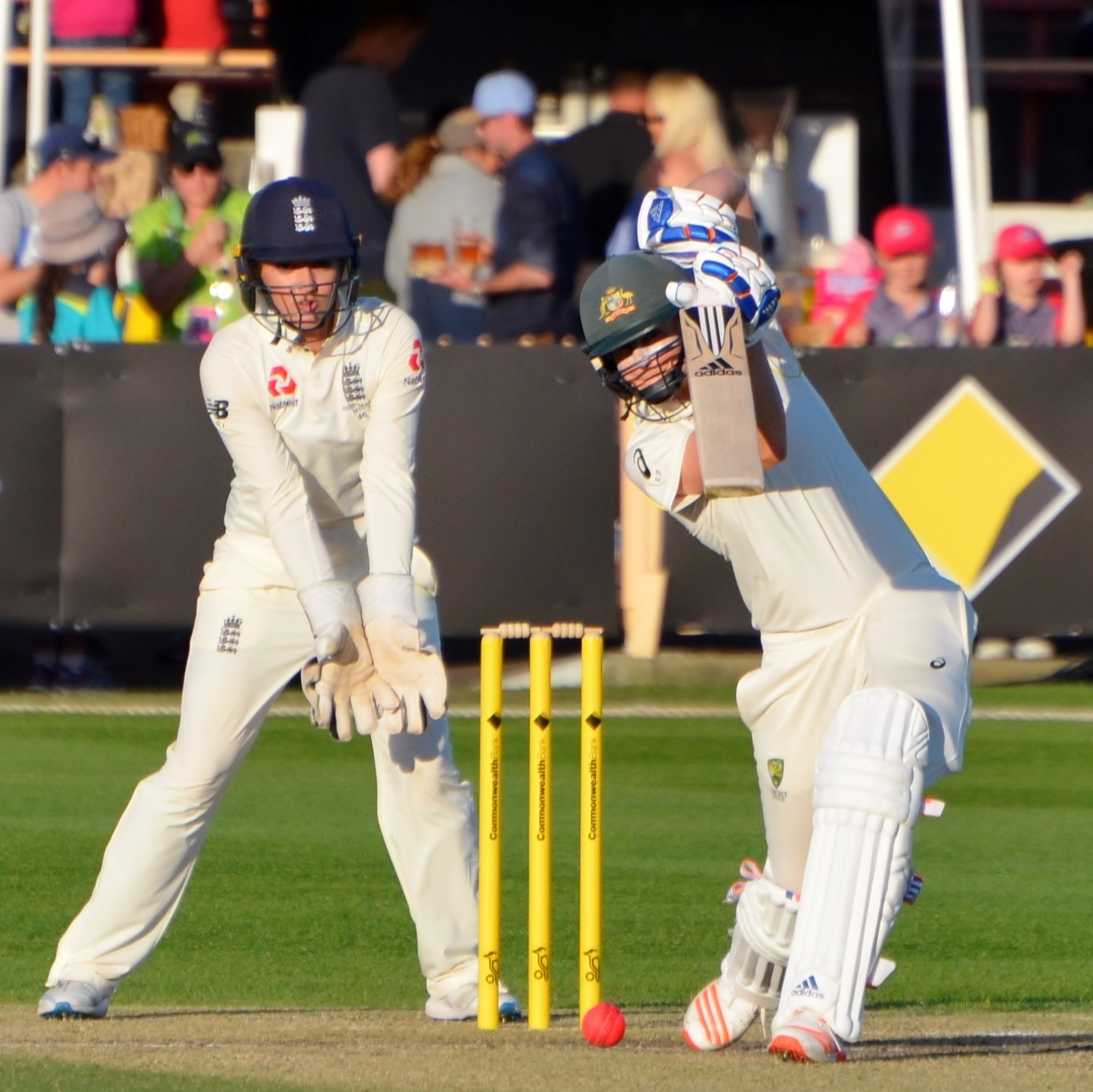
A cricket match in progress, showing the III formation of the wicket, with the bails intact at the top.

Nelson is cricket slang, as well as a superstition, named for Horatio Nelson, 1st Viscount Nelson.

The name, applied to team or individual scores of 111 or multiples thereof (known as double nelson, triple nelson, etc.) is thought to refer to a wicket. Various sources ascribe it to referring to Nelson's three major naval victories (won, won, won), or (incorrectly) to "one eye, one arm and one leg" – Nelson never in fact lost a leg or his eye, although he lost the sight of one eye (see the portrait at right). Longtime cricket historian and scorer, Bill "Bearders" Frindall once referred to it online as "one eye, one arm and one etcetera", implying that Nelson's alleged third lost body part was "something else", however this is equally mythical. In the 1939 film of Goodbye, Mr Chips a schoolboy refers to Nelson in these terms: "One arm, one eye, one destiny". Umpire David Shepherd during a radio interview to mark his retirement explained it as "One arm, one eye and one lump of sugar in his tea."

It is thought by the superstitious that bad things happen on that score, although an investigation by the magazine The Cricketer in the 1990s found that wickets are no more likely to fall on Nelson and indeed, the score at which most wickets fall is 0 (a duck). It may be considered unlucky because the number resembles a wicket without bails (a batsman is out if the bails are knocked off their wicket).

The New Zealand cricket team Nelson played first-class cricket from 1874 to 1891. In both their first and last first-class innings they were dismissed for 111.

David Shepherd made popular the longstanding practice of raising a leg or legs from the ground on Nelson in an effort to avoid ill fate. When crowds noticed this, they would cheer his leg-raising.

The equivalent superstitious number in Australian cricket is 87, or the "Devil's Number". Many, including commentators and journalists, think 87 is considered unlucky because it is thirteen shy of 100 however an alternative thought is it came to be known as the "Devil's Number" after Ian Johnson was dismissed for 87 while playing grade cricket and Keith Miller commented "That's funny, I once saw Bradman dismissed for 87". It turned out that Bradman had actually been dismissed for 89 and the MCG scorers hadn't updated his last two runs before his dismissal; however, the superstition remained. Statistics have shown that more Australian batsmen are in fact dismissed on the numbers surrounding 87.

In 1981, during the 3rd Test of the Ashes series at Headingley, Australia were dismissed for 111 in the last innings of the Test, chasing a target of 130. This completed an astonishing turnaround in the match after England had been forced to follow-on after a first-innings collapse (despite the best efforts of Ian Botham, who took six wickets in Australia's first innings and scored 50 in England's), but Botham's second-innings 149* and Willis's eight wickets won the match for England.

3rd and deciding Test, South Africa versus Australia, 2026, again it was Australia out for 111 and so to date remain as the only Test team to be dismissed for Nelson, now twice in failed 4th innings chases. They lost by 176 runs on the fifth day with a "deplorable" batting display with spinner Simon Harmer taking 6 for 16 in 21.1 overs to complete a match 10 wicket haul. In contrast to the 4th, the first 3 innings yielded more than 1,100 runs.

On 11 November 2011, in a Test match between South Africa and Australia with the time at 11:11 and with South Africa requiring 111 runs to win, the majority of the crowd and umpire Ian Gould did Shepherd's leg raise Nelson for that minute with the scoreboard reading 11:11 11/11/11.

In 2015, in the fourth Test of that year's Ashes series, Australia were dismissed in 18 (six-ball) overs and 3 deliveries - 111 legitimate deliveries (there were also three no-balls) – for 60, with Stuart Broad taking 8/15. This was, at the time (and still is) the record for the shortest ever first innings of a Test, at least counting the legitimate deliveries (although Bangladesh's collapse against the West Indies in Antigua, in 2018, lasted 112 legitimate deliveries and contained no no-balls or wides.)

On 8 May 2019, in the Women's T20 Challenge in Jaipur, Trailblazers vs Velocity, Trailblazers were 111 for 2, chasing a target of 113. Then they lost five wickets in seven balls for no runs, making the score 111 for 7. However, they went on to win.
