= Charles Knapp (cricketer) =

New Zealand cricketer (1845–1927)

Personal information
- Full name: Charles Arthur Knapp
- Born: 27 November 1845; Sleaford, Lincolnshire, England
- Died: 9 September 1927 (aged 81); Wellington, New Zealand
- Role: All-rounder, occasional wicket-keeper

Domestic team information
- Years: Team
- 1873/74–1884/85: Wellington

Career statistics
Competition	First-class
Matches	9
Runs scored	124
Batting average	7.75
100s/50s	0/0
Top score	37
Balls bowled	512
Wickets	11
Bowling average	9.54
5 wickets in innings	1
10 wickets in match	0
Best bowling	5/21
Catches/stumpings	3/0
- Source: Cricinfo, 1 July 2023

Charles Arthur Knapp (27 November 1845 – 9 September 1927) was a New Zealand sportsman. He played in nine first-class cricket matches for Wellington from 1873 to 1885, and was prominent in many other sports.

== Life and career ==
Born in Sleaford, Lincolnshire, Knapp was educated at Lancing College and Oxford University. He emigrated to New Zealand in 1871, and worked for the Australian Mutual Provident Society in Wellington until 1881, when he joined the Public Works Department as a computer. He retired in 1891 and spent the rest of his life as a "private gentleman" in Wellington, sharing a residence with Martin Chapman KC. He was a director of the Kelburn Tram Company.

In his second first-class match, in March 1874, Knapp made 37, the highest score of the match on either side, in a tie between Wellington and Nelson. In his next match a year later he was again the highest scorer, with 31 and 10, when Wellington lost narrowly to Nelson by two wickets. His batting was less effective later, but he took 5 for 21 and 2 for 5 opening the bowling against Nelson in December 1876, when Nelson won by 41 runs.

Later, Knapp served on the committee of the Wellington Cricket Association for many years. He also umpired four first-class matches at the Basin Reserve in Wellington between 1884 and 1894.

Knapp was a life member of the Wellington Football Club and a referee, and a participant and administrator in both rowing and athletics. In his later years he was a keen bowler; he died at home the day after collapsing on the green at the Wellington Bowling Club, aged 81.
