= Herbert Kissling =

New Zealand cricketer

Personal information
- Full name: John Herbert Percy Kissling
- Born: 3 March 1868; Blenheim, New Zealand
- Died: 11 May 1929 (aged 61); Parnell, Auckland, New Zealand
- Batting: Right-handed
- Relatives: George Kissling (grandfather)

Domestic team information
- Years: Team
- 1885/86: Nelson
- 1889/90: Auckland

Career statistics
Competition	First-class
Matches	6
Runs scored	231
Batting average	25.66
100s/50s	0/1
Top score	51
Catches/stumpings	3/–
- Source: Cricinfo, 9 September 2024

John Herbert Percy Kissling (3 March 1868 – 11 May 1929) was a New Zealand cricketer and insurance company executive.

Kissling played first-class cricket for Nelson and Auckland between 1885 and 1890. A right-handed batsman, he captained Auckland on their three-match southern tour in December 1889 and January 1890. He was the outstanding batsman on either side in Auckland's victory in the first match, against Otago, scoring 21 and 40 not out in a match that was completed on the first scheduled day. A few weeks later, he made his highest first-class score of 51, which was also Auckland's highest score in the match, when he captained Auckland against the touring New South Wales cricket team.

Kissling joined the New Zealand Insurance Company in 1884, and from 1890 he spent several years in its branches in Victoria and Tasmania. He married May Tuthill of Ballarat in Ballarat in March 1897. He returned to New Zealand in 1911 to manage the Auckland branch, and was appointed General Manager of the company in 1919.

Kissling died suddenly at his home in the Auckland suburb of Parnell in May 1929, aged 61, shortly before he was due to retire. His wife and their two sons and one daughter survived him.
