= Karl J. Sleight =

American lawyer

Karl J. Sleight is an American attorney and Treasurer of the Saratoga County Bar Association (New York). He resides in Saratoga Springs, New York. In 2000, he was appointed Executive Director of the New York State Ethics Commission.

As of February 27, 2007 Sleight has resigned from the Ethics Commission to work at a private law firm, Harris Beach PLLC.
