= William Moule =

Australian cricketer (1858–1939)

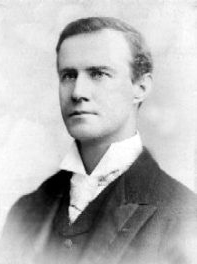

Personal information
- Full name: William Henry Moule
- Born: 31 January 1858; Brighton, Melbourne, Victoria, Australia
- Died: 24 August 1939 (aged 81); St Kilda, Melbourne, Victoria
- Batting: Right-handed
- Bowling: Right-arm medium

International information
- National side: Australia
- Only Test (cap 22): 6 September 1880 v England

Career statistics
Competition	Test	First-class
Matches	1	9
Runs scored	40	137
Batting average	20.00	11.41
100s/50s	0/0	0/0
Top score	34	34
Balls bowled	51	207
Wickets	3	5
Bowling average	7.66	21.19
5 wickets in innings	0	0
10 wickets in match	0	0
Best bowling	3/23	3/23
Catches/stumpings	1/–	7/–
- Source: Cricinfo, 12 October 2022

William Henry Moule (31 January 1858 – 24 August 1939) was an Australian lawyer, politician and cricketer.

== Cricket career ==
Moule was a moderate batsman, useful bowler and excellent fieldsman. His cricket career was short, and though he played a few times for Victoria, most of his first-class appearances were on the 1880 tour of England with the Australian team under Billy Murdoch.

He played in the one Test match of the tour, a hastily arranged match at The Oval which was the first Test in England. Moule's success to that point had been modest – no innings of note and only one wicket – and he played only because Fred Spofforth was injured. In the Test he batted at No 11 and was the sixth bowler tried. With three wickets for 23 runs he was the most successful bowler in England's first innings and his 34 in Australia's second innings helped in a last-wicket partnership of 88 with his captain that avoided an innings defeat.

He was the last surviving player on either side from the 1880 Test.

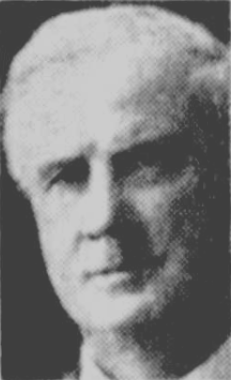
William Moule, 1935.

== Legal and political career ==
Moule resided in Melbourne at Clarence House (now known as the old Mansion nightclub) in 1876 whilst being educated at Melbourne Grammar School and took a law degree at Melbourne University, being called to the bar in 1879 and going into practice the following year. He rose to become a county court judge specialising in insolvency cases, retiring in April 1935, at which point he was the longest-serving member of the bench.

Moule had a short but sensational career as a politician. Standing on a free trade platform in the Victoria state election of 1894, he beat the sitting member, the long-time minister and future premier of Victoria, Sir Thomas Bent. Bent was accused of various forms of corruption, and there had been some difficulty finding a candidate who would stand against him. As a member of the legislature until 1900, Moule chaired royal commissions on law reform and on factory and shop law.

== Personal life ==
Moule married Jessie Osborne in Melbourne in January 1885. One of their sons, Humphrey Osborne Moule, was killed in the First World War at Lone Pine, one of the main actions of the ill-fated Gallipoli campaign.

Moule died in August 1939 at the age of 81. He was survived by his wife, a daughter and a son.
