= Harry Halliday (cricketer, born 1855) =

New Zealand cricketer (1855–1922)

Personal information
- Full name: Henry Holden Halliday
- Born: 30 March 1855; Nelson, New Zealand
- Died: 19 July 1922 (aged 67); Hokitika, West Coast, New Zealand

Domestic team information
- Years: Team
- 1873/74–1880/81: Nelson

Career statistics
Competition	First-class
Matches	7
Runs scored	111
Batting average	7.92
100s/50s	0/0
Top score	35
Catches/stumpings	4/–
- Source: Cricinfo, 13 January 2018

Henry Holden Halliday (30 March 1855 – 19 July 1922) was a New Zealand cricketer who played first-class cricket for Nelson from 1874 to 1880.

Halliday was born in Nelson and educated at Nelson College. On his first-class debut against Wellington in 1873–74, Harry Halliday opened the batting in the first innings for Nelson and made 35, their highest score of the match. He was less successful with the bat in later matches, but he established himself as one of the best long stops in New Zealand at a time when that was an important fielding position.

Halliday worked in the New Zealand Post and Telegraph service. He was in charge of the telegraph office at Nelson in the 1870s, and was noted for his speed as a telegraphist. While working in the telegraph office in Wellington in 1892, he was appointed to a senior position in the office in Hokitika. He was working as a clerk in the Department of Agriculture, Industries and Commerce in Hokitika when he was dismissed in March 1913. He died suddenly aged 67 at his home in Hokitika in July 1922, leaving a widow, a daughter and three sons.
