= Botanical Gardens, Nelson =

Park in Nelson, New Zealand

Coordinates: 41°16′26.19″S 173°17′43.94″E

Botanical Gardens
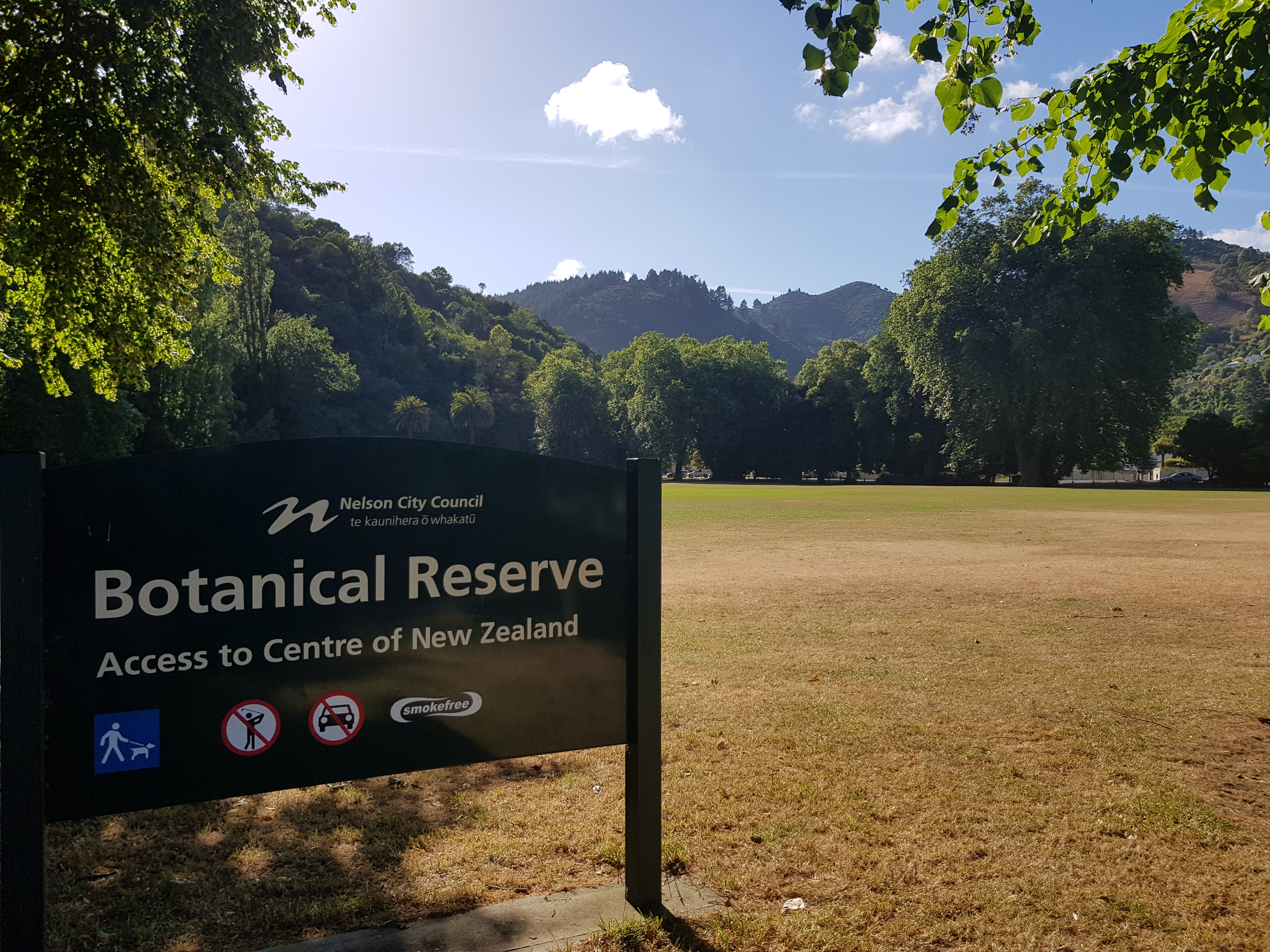
- Interactive map of Botanical Gardens

Ground information
- Location: Nelson, New Zealand
- Country: New Zealand
- Establishment: 1873 (first recorded match)

Team information
Nelson	(1883)
- As of 3 November 2011; Source: Ground profile

Botanical Gardens is a cricket ground and public reserve in Nelson, Nelson Region, New Zealand.

It is located in Nelson's town belt, next to Botanical Reserve. The trigonometrical 'Centre of New Zealand', Botanical Hill, is located beside the park.

The first recorded cricket match held on the ground came in January 1873 when Nelson played Auckland. The ground later held a first-class match when Nelson played Wellington on 31 December 1883, which Nelson won by 39 runs.

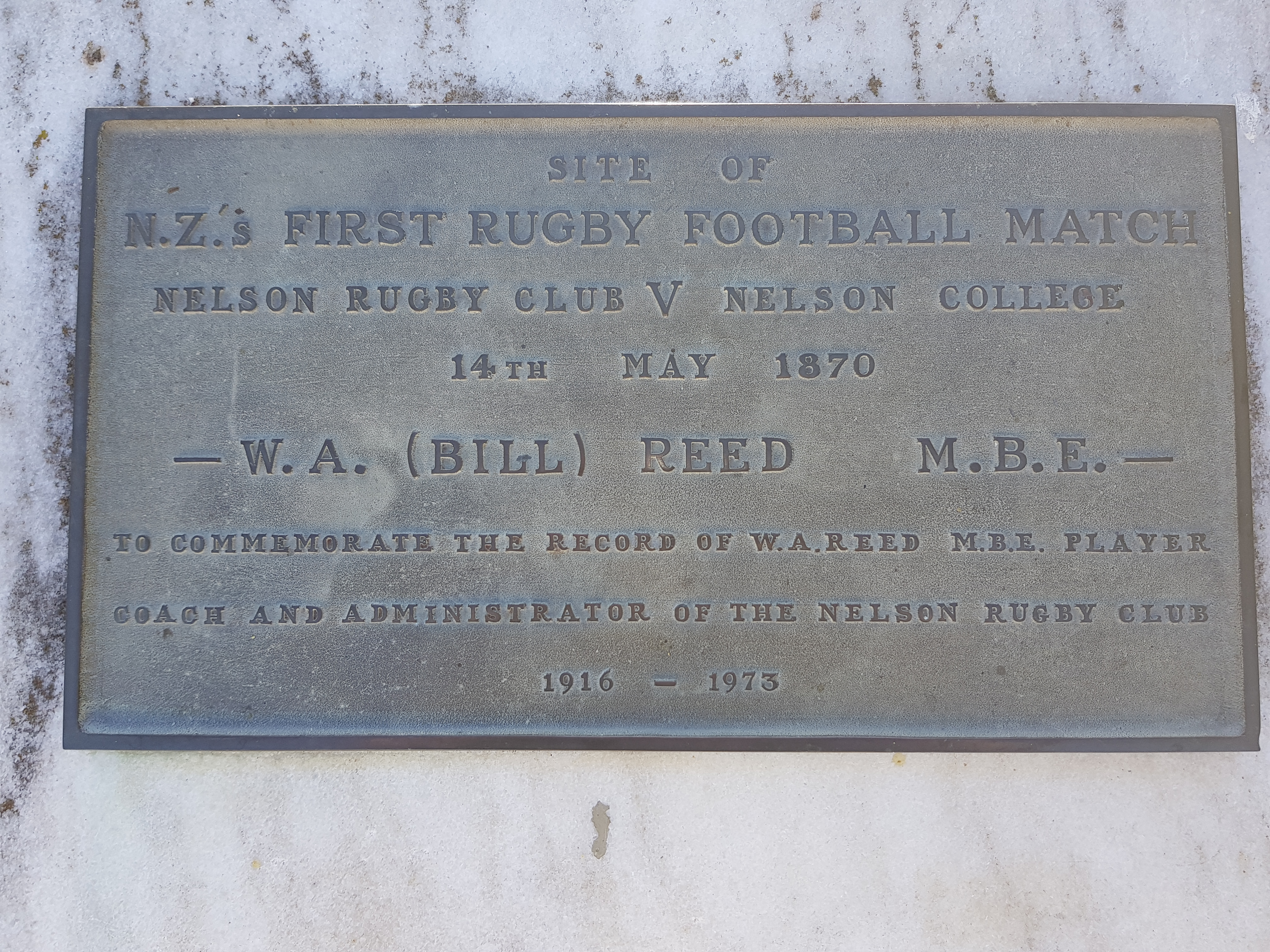
Plaque from the Botanic Reserve, Nelson

Besides cricket, the ground also saw one of the first rugby matches to be played in New Zealand, between Nelson College and a group of local players on 14 May 1870. After Trafalgar Park's development as Nelson's main sports venue in the 1880s the Botanical Gardens was no longer used for major sports events. The ground, however, has continued to exist, and is used today by Athletic College Old Boys Cricket Club.
