= Jim Slight =

Australian cricketer

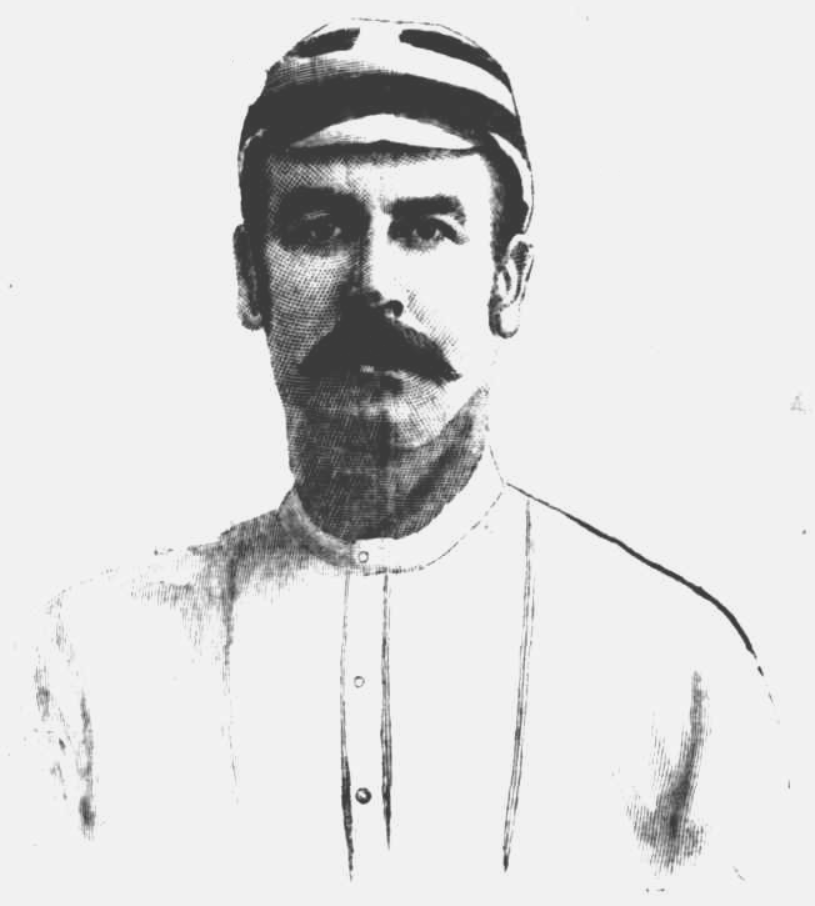
- Portrait from 1893.

Personal information
- Full name: James Slight
- Born: 20 October 1855; Ashby, Victoria
- Died: 9 December 1930 (aged 75); Elsternwick, Victoria
- Batting: Right-handed
- Relatives: William Slight (brother)

International information
- National side: Australia
- Only Test (cap 24): 6 September 1880 v England

Career statistics
Competition	Test	First-class
Matches	1	19
Runs scored	11	415
Batting average	5.50	12.57
100s/50s	0/0	0/1
Top score	11	53
Balls bowled	–	57
Wickets	–	3
Bowling average	–	12.33
5 wickets in innings	–	0
10 wickets in match	–	0
Best bowling	–	2/4
Catches/stumpings	0/–	4/–
- Source: CricInfo, 12 October 2022

James Slight (20 October 1855 – 9 December 1930) was an Australian cricketer who played in one Test match in 1880.

Slight played first-class cricket as a batsman for Victoria from 1874 to 1888, but was never able to replicate at state level his heavy scoring for South Melbourne, where his score of 279 in 1882–83 is still the club record. He toured England in 1880 with the Australian team and played in the first Test to be held in England, but his tour was marred by illness.

Slight was also a leading Australian rules footballer for South Melbourne Football Club in the Victorian Football Association (VFA) as well as a field umpire, who, in 1879, umpired the first ever interstate Australian rules matches between Victoria and South Australia.

== Sources ==
- Atkinson, G. (1982) Everything you ever wanted to know about Australian rules football but couldn't be bothered asking, The Five Mile Press: Melbourne. ISBN 0 86788 009 0.
