= Louis Fowler =

New Zealand cricketer

Personal information
- Full name: Louis Arthur Fowler
- Born: 25 August 1865; Nelson, New Zealand
- Died: 12 October 1927 (aged 62); Taranaki, New Zealand
- Source: ESPNcricinfo, 28 June 2016

Louis Fowler (25 August 1865 – 12 October 1927) was a New Zealand cricketer. He played first-class cricket for Nelson and Taranaki between 1882 and 1898.

== See also ==
- List of Taranaki representative cricketers
