= Andrew Percy Bennett =

British diplomat (1866–1943)

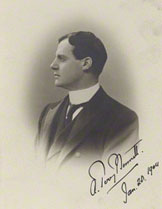
- Andrew Percy Bennett in 1904

Personal information
- Born: 30 July 1866; Fulbourn, Cambridgeshire, England
- Died: 3 November 1943 (aged 77); Hove, Sussex, England
- Bowling: Fast-medium
- Role: All-rounder

Domestic team information
- Years: Team
- 1885/86–1886/87: Nelson

Career statistics
Competition	First-class
Matches	2
Runs scored	55
Batting average	18.33
100s/50s	0/1
Top score	52
Balls bowled	323
Wickets	19
Bowling average	6.26
5 wickets in innings	3
10 wickets in match	1
Best bowling	6/5
Catches/stumpings	3/–
- Source: CricketArchive, 26 July 2017

Andrew Percy Bennett CMG (30 July 1866 – 3 November 1943) was a British diplomat.

== Early life ==
Andrew Percy Bennett was born in Fulbourn, Cambridgeshire, where his father, the Reverend Augustus F. Bennett, was an Anglican clergyman. He attended Blackheath College (now Eltham College).

== New Zealand and cricket career ==
At the start of the 1886 New Zealand school year, at the age of 19, Bennett took up a position as Fourth Master at Nelson College, a boys' school in the city of Nelson, New Zealand. He was later promoted to Third Master.

The presence of Bennett, the headmaster William Justice Ford, and another master, William Still Littlejohn, in the college cricket team made it a strong presence among the local clubs. All three also played for Nelson in interprovincial matches.

Bennett, a batsman and opening bowler, played twice for Nelson, each time against Wellington. In his first match, in Nelson in March 1886, he devastated the Wellington batting, taking 6 for 13 and 6 for 5, dismissing Wellington for 36 and 19. In his other match, in Wellington in December 1886, he made 52, the highest individual score in Nelson's first-class history, and took 6 for 55 in Wellington's second innings, but Wellington won narrowly.

== Cambridge ==
Bennett left New Zealand in March 1888 and returned to England, where he enrolled at Christ's College, Cambridge. He graduated in 1891 with Honours in Mediaeval and Modern Languages. He converted his BA to an MA in 1897.

== Diplomatic career ==
Bennett was appointed to the position of British Vice-Consul at Manila in 1893, and then at Galatz in 1895. In 1896 he was appointed H.M. Consul at New York. He served as Commercial Attaché in Vienna, Rome and Athens before being appointed as Royal Commissioner for the International Exhibitions at Brussels in 1910, and at Rome and Turin in 1911.

In the 1920s he served successively as Britain's ambassador to Panama, Costa Rica and, in 1924, to Venezuela.

== Personal life ==
Bennett married Winifred May (née Youell) in 1896 in Galatz, Romania. They had one daughter, Iris, who was born in Bucharest in 1900. They divorced in 1927.

In 1912, he was appointed Companion of the Order of St Michael and St George. He died in Hove, Sussex, in November 1943, aged 77.
