= Wakefield, New Zealand =

Town in Tasman District, New Zealand

Wakefield
- Town
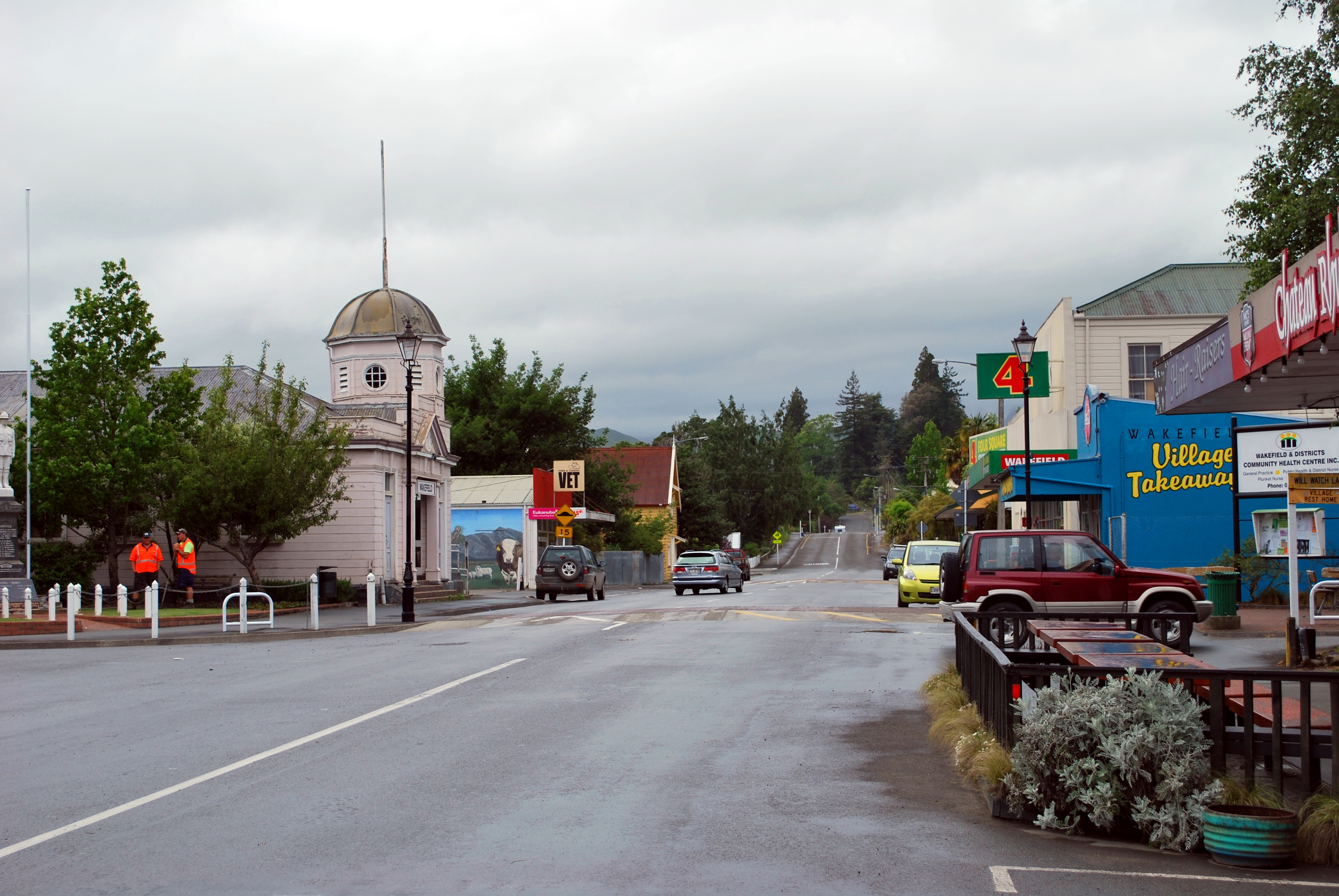
- Edward St, the main street of Wakefield
- Interactive map of Wakefield
- Coordinates: 41°24′S 173°03′E
- Country: New Zealand
- Territorial authority: Tasman
- Ward: Moutere-Waimea Ward
- Electorates: West Coast-Tasman; Te Tai Tonga (Māori)

Government
  - Territorial Authority: Tasman District Council
  - Mayor of Tasman: Tim King
  - West Coast-Tasman MP: Maureen Pugh
  - Te Tai Tonga MP: Tākuta Ferris

Area
  - Total: 9.92 km^{2} (3.83 sq mi)

Population (June 2025)
  - Total: 2,730
  - Density: 275/km^{2} (713/sq mi)
- Time zone: UTC+12 (NZST)
  - Summer (DST): UTC+13 (NZDT)
- Area code: 03

Wakefield (Māori: Tiraweke or Wekipira) is a settlement in the Tasman District of New Zealand's South Island, located about 25km south west of Nelson.

The settlement began in 1843 as Pitfure, but the name was changed to Wakefield a short time later. It may have been named after the birthplace of one of its original settlers, who was from Wakefield in Yorkshire. It may have also been named after Captain Arthur Wakefield, who led the expedition that first established Nelson City and Province. Arthur Wakefield was killed in the Wairau Affray, which may have helped confirm the change of name from Pitfure to Wakefield.

Wakefield comes under the responsibility of the Tasman District Council, which has its offices in the nearby town of Richmond. It is part of the West Coast-Tasman general electorate.

St John's Church in 120 Edward Street, built in 1846, is New Zealand's second oldest surviving church. It is registered by Heritage New Zealand as a Category I heritage structure, with registration number 40. The church was designed by Marianne Reay and is considered the first European building designed by a woman in New Zealand.

== Demographics ==
Stats NZ describes Wakefield as a small urban area, which covers 9.92 km^{2} (3.83 sq mi). It had an estimated population of 2,730 as of June 2025, with a population density of 275 people per km^{2}.

Historical population for Wakefield
Year	Pop.	±% p.a.
2006	1,974	—
2013	2,301	+2.21%
2018	2,448	+1.25%
2023	2,694	+1.93%

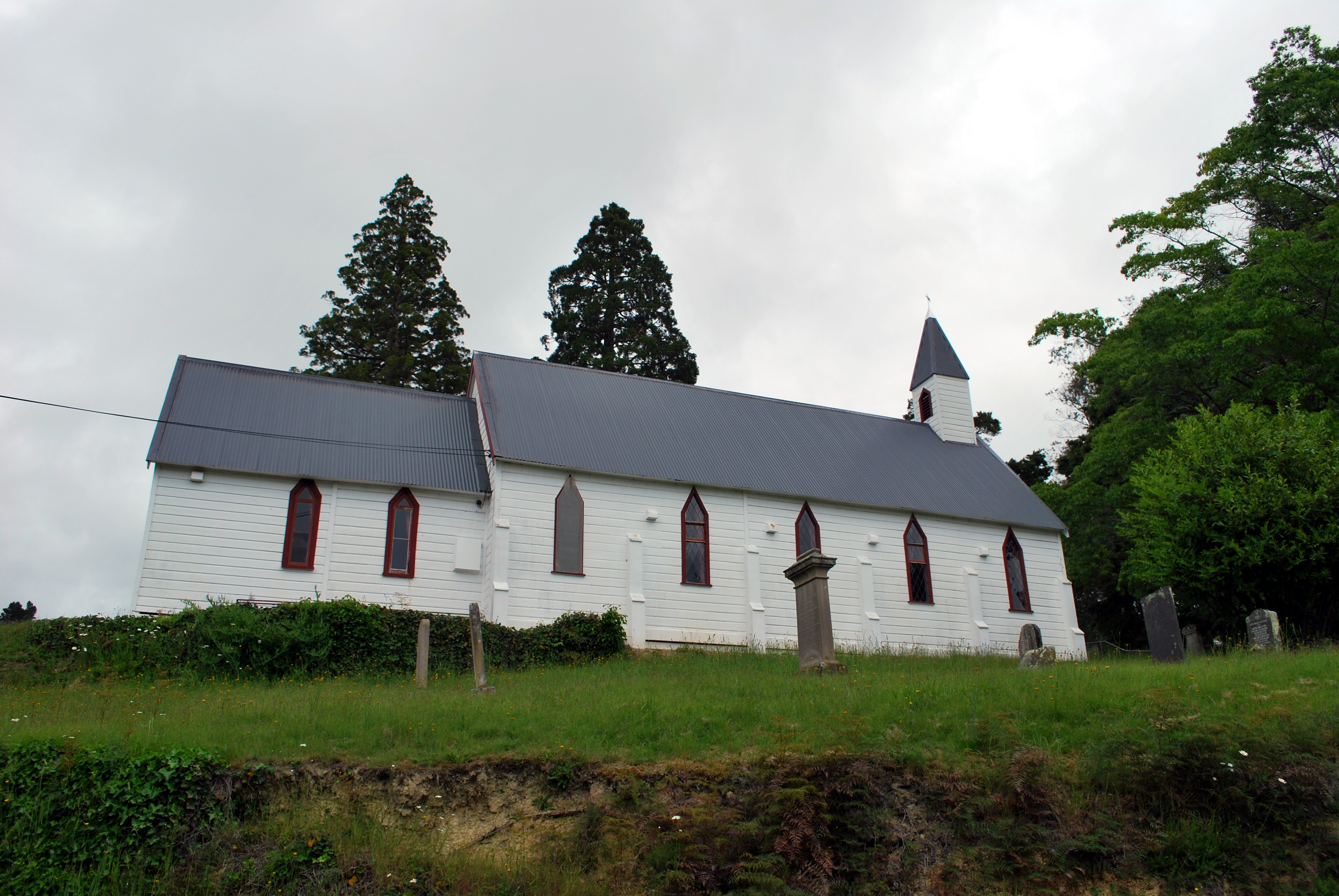
St John's Church

Wakefield had a population of 2,694 in the 2023 New Zealand census, an increase of 246 people (10.0%) since the 2018 census, and an increase of 393 people (17.1%) since the 2013 census. There were 1,323 males, 1,362 females, and 9 people of other genders in 927 dwellings. 2.1% of people identified as LGBTIQ+. The median age was 41.1 years (compared with 38.1 years nationally). There were 567 people (21.0%) aged under 15 years, 399 (14.8%) aged 15 to 29, 1,251 (46.4%) aged 30 to 64, and 474 (17.6%) aged 65 or older.

People could identify as more than one ethnicity. The results were 96.3% European (Pākehā); 8.5% Māori; 1.4% Pasifika; 1.3% Asian; 0.6% Middle Eastern, Latin American and African New Zealanders (MELAA); and 1.8% other, which includes people giving their ethnicity as "New Zealander". English was spoken by 97.9%, Māori by 1.4%, Samoan by 0.1%, and other languages by 3.9%. No language could be spoken by 1.9% (e.g. too young to talk). New Zealand Sign Language was known by 0.3%. The percentage of people born overseas was 16.1, compared with 28.8% nationally.

Religious affiliations were 22.9% Christian, 0.1% Hindu, 0.2% Buddhist, 0.7% New Age, 0.1% Jewish, and 0.8% other religions. People who answered that they had no religion were 66.3%, and 9.0% of people did not answer the census question.

Of those at least 15 years old, 375 (17.6%) people had a bachelor's or higher degree, 1,281 (60.2%) had a post-high school certificate or diploma, and 468 (22.0%) people exclusively held high school qualifications. The median income was $41,300, compared with $41,500 nationally. 183 people (8.6%) earned over $100,000 compared to 12.1% nationally. The employment status of those at least 15 was 1,125 (52.9%) full-time, 321 (15.1%) part-time, and 27 (1.3%) unemployed.

=== Wakefield Rural ===
Wakefield Rural is a statistical area that surrounds but does not include Wakefield. It covers 375.79 km^{2} (145.09 sq mi). It had an estimated population of 1,360 as of June 2025, with a population density of 3.6 people per km^{2}.

Historical populations for Wakefield Rural
Year	Pop.	±% p.a.
2006	1,176	—
2013	1,173	−0.04%
2018	1,248	+1.25%
2023	1,353	+1.63%

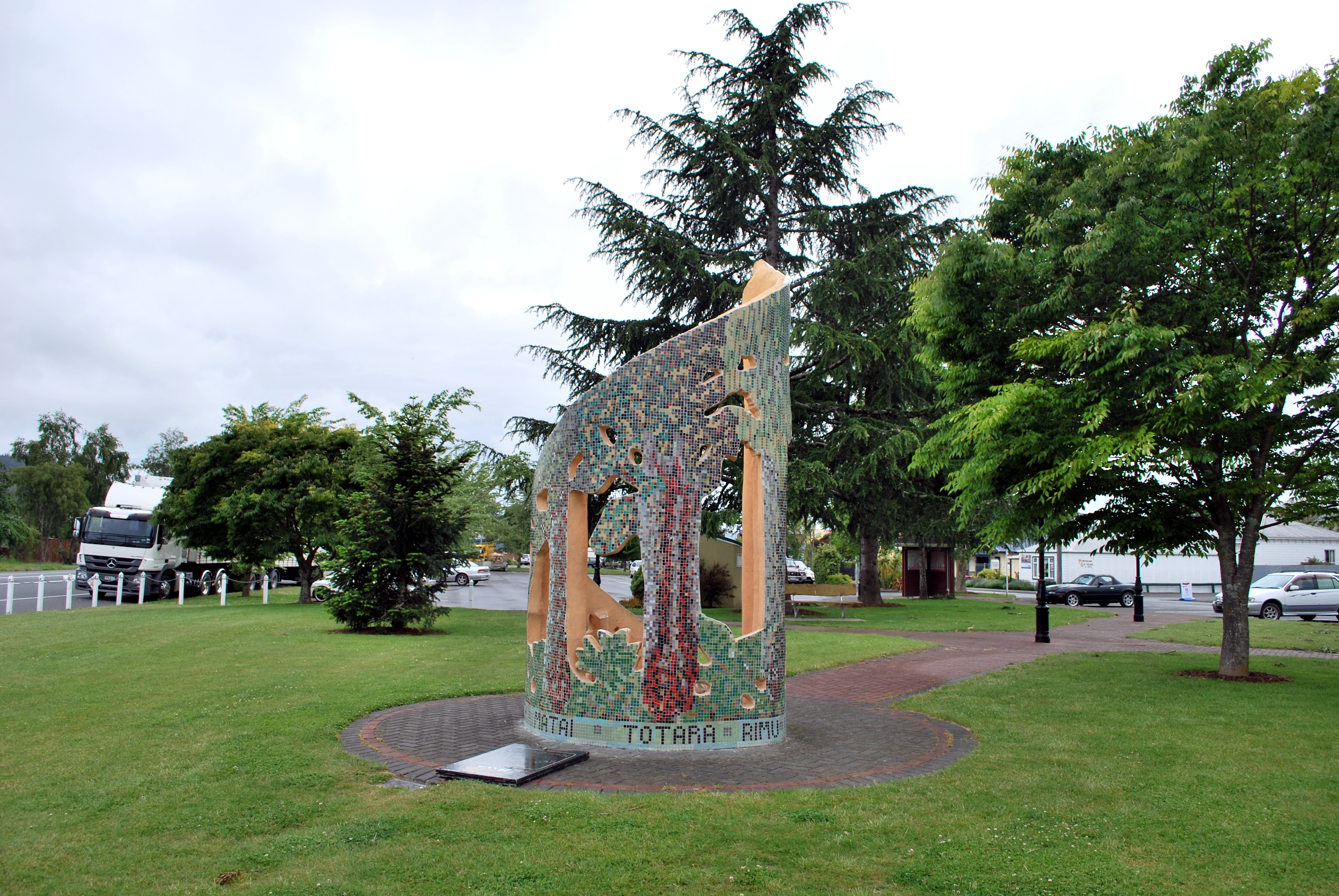
A tree sculpture at Wakefield

Wakefield Rural had a population of 1,353 in the 2023 New Zealand census, an increase of 105 people (8.4%) since the 2018 census, and an increase of 180 people (15.3%) since the 2013 census. There were 675 males, 666 females, and 9 people of other genders in 483 dwellings. 2.2% of people identified as LGBTIQ+. The median age was 48.2 years (compared with 38.1 years nationally). There were 228 people (16.9%) aged under 15 years, 207 (15.3%) aged 15 to 29, 675 (49.9%) aged 30 to 64, and 243 (18.0%) aged 65 or older.

People could identify as more than one ethnicity. The results were 96.0% European (Pākehā); 8.2% Māori; 0.7% Pasifika; 2.0% Asian; 0.7% Middle Eastern, Latin American and African New Zealanders (MELAA); and 2.9% other, which includes people giving their ethnicity as "New Zealander". English was spoken by 98.0%, Māori by 0.9%, and other languages by 6.0%. No language could be spoken by 1.8% (e.g. too young to talk). New Zealand Sign Language was known by 0.2%. The percentage of people born overseas was 15.7, compared with 28.8% nationally.

Religious affiliations were 25.5% Christian, 0.4% Māori religious beliefs, 0.4% Buddhist, 0.2% New Age, and 0.7% other religions. People who answered that they had no religion were 61.9%, and 10.4% of people did not answer the census question.

Of those at least 15 years old, 213 (18.9%) people had a bachelor's or higher degree, 672 (59.7%) had a post-high school certificate or diploma, and 240 (21.3%) people exclusively held high school qualifications. The median income was $38,100, compared with $41,500 nationally. 114 people (10.1%) earned over $100,000 compared to 12.1% nationally. The employment status of those at least 15 was 606 (53.9%) full-time, 201 (17.9%) part-time, and 21 (1.9%) unemployed.

== Education ==
Wakefield School is a co-educational state primary school for Year 1 to 6 students, with a roll of 260 as of July 2026. The school was set up in 1843 by Mary Ann Baigent, the wife of Edward Baigent, and may be the oldest school in continuous usage in New Zealand.

Former schools in the area include Eighty-Eight Valley School (1863-1929), Koreke School (1863-1930), and Totara Bush Household School (-1945).
