= Nelson cricket team =

New Zealand cricket team

Personnel
- Owner: Nelson Cricket Association

Team information
- Founded: 1874
- Home ground: Saxton Oval, Nelson

History
- Hawke Cup wins: 11
- Official website: www.nelsoncricket.org.nz

Nelson cricket team is a cricket team representing the Nelson Region of New Zealand. It played first-class cricket from 1874 to 1891, and is now one of the 21 teams from around New Zealand that compete in the Hawke Cup.

== Playing history ==
Cricket was first reported as being played in Nelson in the Nelson Examiner in March 1844, in a match between the Surveyors of the Land Company and Nelson. Nelson as a representative team played interprovincial cricket as early as 1862, later first playing first-class cricket in 1873–74 against Wellington at the Basin Reserve, becoming the fifth team to play first-class cricket in New Zealand. This match is also notable for having ended in a tie, the eighth time this had happened and one of sixty occasions overall that a first-class match has ended in such a result.

Over the coming seasons, Nelson averaged one first-class match a year, all but one of them against Wellington, before appearing in first-class cricket for a final time in 1891 against Wellington at Trafalgar Park. Nelson played 17 times in first-class cricket, winning nine and losing seven. Nelson used three home grounds during this period, all of them in the city of Nelson: Victory Square, the Botanical Gardens and Trafalgar Park.

The 17 matches were extremely low-scoring affairs. Only twice did a side reach 200, and on 40 occasions a side was dismissed for under 100. Nelson's highest team score was 238 at Wellington in 1880–81, when Louis Balmain, in his only first-class match, top-scored with 40, having also top-scored with 50, Nelson's first individual fifty, in the first innings. Nelson's only other fifty was a 52 made by Andrew Bennett at Wellington in 1886–87. The best innings and match figures were 9 for 43 and 5 for 20 (14 for 63 in the match) by Thomas Eden in 1875–76. Bennett, in his only other first-class match, took 6 for 13 and 6 for 5 for Nelson in 1885–86.

The origin of the "Nelson" superstition in cricket is unknown. However, in both Nelson's first and last innings in first-class cricket they were dismissed for 111 – "Nelson".

== Current status ==
Nelson today compete in the Hawke Cup, which is played below first-class level. Nelson have won the competition several times, and hold the record for the longest period of holding the trophy, from December 1958 to February 1965. They also held the title from 1979 to 1983.

In 1963–64, defending their title against Waikato, Nelson made 632, a Hawke Cup record. The record stood until Nelson beat it in 1983–84, when they scored 641 for seven defending their title against Taranaki. In their next match, in 1984–85, they beat it again, scoring 649 against Wairarapa. The record stood until Manawatu beat it with 650 all out in 1993–94.

The Nelson Cricket Association relocated from Trafalgar Park to Saxton Oval in 2009. The Nelson Cricket Association forms part of the Central Districts cricket team, which competes in first-class, List A and Twenty20 domestic cricket competitions.
