= River Lee (disambiguation) =

The River Lee is a river in County Cork, Ireland.

River Lee or similar names (including homophones) may also refer to:

== Rivers ==
- Lea River, Tasmania, Australia
- Lee (Vechte), Lower Saxony, Germany
- Lee Creek (Ohio River tributary), West Virginia, United States
- Lee River, Tasman, New Zealand
- Lee River (Canterbury), New Zealand, originating in Southbridge
- Lees River, Massachusetts, United States
- Leigh River (Victoria), Australia
- River Lea, south-east England
  - Lee Navigation, part of the south-east England river
  - River Lee Diversion, part of the south-east England river
- River Lee (Kerry), Ireland, flows through Tralee

== Settlements ==
- Riverlea, Ohio, a small United States city
- Riverlea, New Zealand, a suburb of Hamilton
- Riverlea, a township in Florida, Gauteng, South Africa

== Other ==
- River Lea (song) (2015), by Adele
