= Lee River =

Location
- Country: New Zealand

Physical characteristics
- Source
  - location: Bryant Range
- Mouth: Wairoa River
  - coordinates: 41°24′19″S 173°07′50″E
- Length: 24 km (15 mi)

The Lee River lies in the northwest of New Zealand's South Island in Tasman District. It is both the inflow and outflow for the Waimea Dam. Lee Reserve, close to the Lee River's confluence with the Wairoa River, is a popular bathing spot.

== Geography ==
The Lee River runs north for 24 km (15 mi), originating in the Bryant Range and flowing into the Wairoa River, just before the latter enters the Waimea Plains. The Lee River has nine tributaries, of which only three are named: Roding River (true right), Long Gully (true right), and Shaggery Gully (true left).

The Lee River is crossed by a road bridge upstream from its confluence with Roding River. This is the start of Mead Road, and the site is one of river flow sites operated by Tasman District.

== Swimming and water quality ==
Lee Reserve, some 5 km (3.1 mi) upstream of Brightwater, is one of the most popular river swimming sites in Tasman District, with 400 to 500 visitors during summer peak. The long-term water quality grade is "fair", as reported by LAWA in March 2026. During the 2016–17 summer, Lee River at Lee Reserve was one of seven freshwater swimming sites in Tasman District where water quality was measured at least weekly. Of the 286 samples taken at freshwater and marine sites during that summer, 16 samples exceeded faecal indicator bacteria levels, and 1 of those samples was from Lee River.

== Waimea Dam ==
In November 2018, Tasman District Council voted 9 to 5 for the Waimea Dam to be built in the Lee Valley. The dam is designed to increase the flow rate in the Lee, Wairoa and Waimea rivers during dry summer periods; when the two cone valves are opened, downstream water levels can rapidly increase. Waimea Dam formally opened on 7 February 2025. The dam is not publicly accessible, as roads leading to it are privately owned.
