= Maitai River =

River in New Zealand

Coordinates: 41°16′S 173°17′E

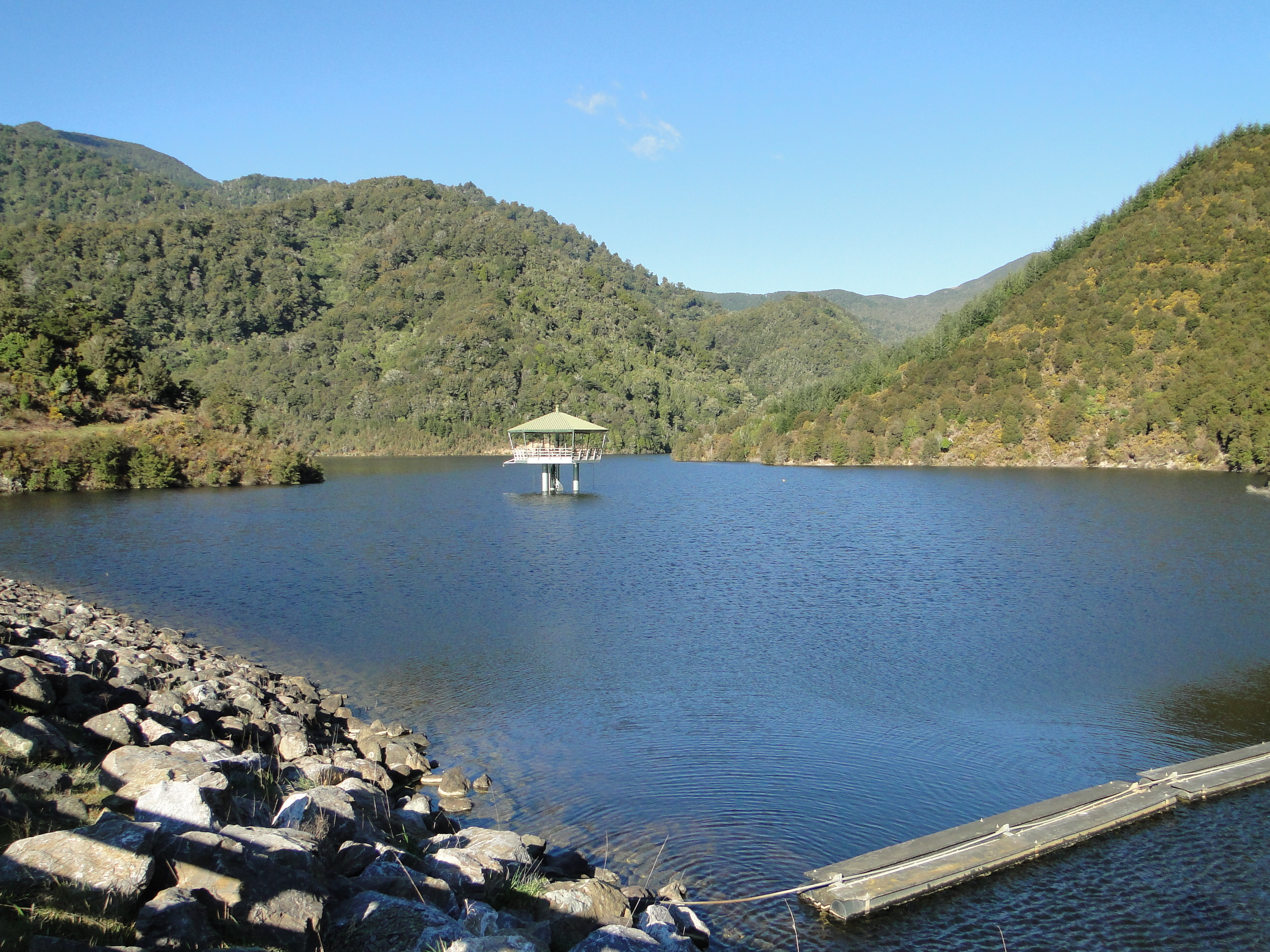
- Water behind the dam on the river

Location
- Country: New Zealand
- State: Nelson

Physical characteristics
- Mouth
  - location: Tasman Bay / Te Tai-o-Aorere
- Length: 11 km (6.8 mi)
- Basin size: 9000 Ha
- Discharge
  - minimum: 190L/s
  - maximum: 400L/s

The Maitai River (also known as the Mahitahi River) is the largest river in the city of Nelson, in the north of New Zealand's South Island. The river stretches from the Bryant Range, situated to the east (inland) of Nelson, where it flows towards the city, flowing west through the heart of the city and into the Tasman bay at Nelson Haven. The catchment of the river covers some 9000 hectares, and has two branches in the upper catchment, the north meets a dam, where the south travels west into the middle catchment, from where it takes its final journey through the urban area of the city before meeting the ocean.

The Maitai river provides habitats for a plethora of diverse wildlife, at all catchments of the river and its surrounding ecosystems. This sees that many species of bird, fish, mammals and reptiles use the river as both a home and a source of food and drinking water, as well as for extensive amounts of vegetation to grow around the abundant water-source. There has also been discoveries of unique life in the Maitai River as well as surrounding rivers in the Nelson region.

Social and leisure uses for the river range from walking trails to swimming holes, where either the river's water that meets the city is used by the population, or its inhabitants walk upstream towards a less urbanised section of the river. Walking trails cover majority of the entrance of the river to the city, creating a source of exercise for the residents of Nelson and surrounding homes. There are also tourist and leisure spots and activities that use the river.

The river is also utilised by the council and government in more economic and resource management ways, where a dam and reservoir has been placed on the river as well as the water from the river is used to supply the neighbouring city of Nelson with water. The river is also used as a storm-water channel and flood channel for Nelson City.

== Geography ==
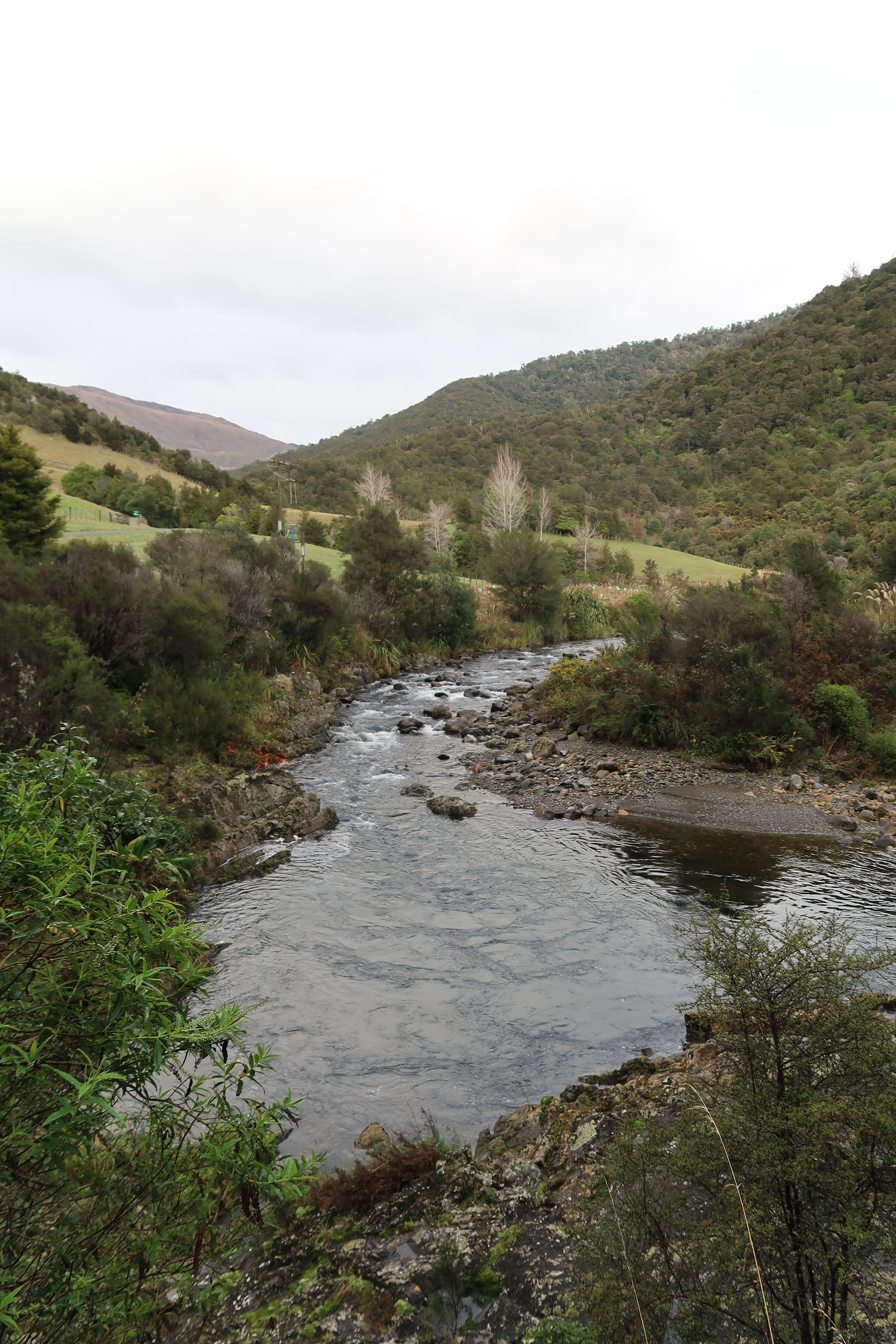
Maitai River

Being the largest river in the Nelson region, the Maitai river is stretches a long distance of 11 kilometres, flowing into the Tasman sea from the Bryant Range. The Maitai river also includes smaller rivers which are tributaries to the main westward flow of the river. These tributaries are considered part of the river; the two mains ones are the Mineral Belt and Roding. Because of the inland nature of the river, once it extends past the urbanised area of the city and more into the east, the river is surrounded by a vast amount of forest and rock-face, where water is channeled into the river. Further upstream, the river meets the Maitai Dam and Reservoir, which is the furthest upstream man-made feature on the river. A layer of thick rock prevents the river from joining with the neighbouring rivers and waters on its eastern side.

The river starts at the Headwaters, where it flows down to the Lowland Hill Country, which is the largest section of the Maitai river, consisting mostly of forest. From there it flows further northwest towards the ocean, as it becomes the Lowland Flats and Allulvai Terraces, which is also mostly forest, but sitting atop flat lands. It then reaches the Coastal Flats, where it meets the ocean, and is the last of the forest land that surrounds the river before it meets the city. The river's mouth opens into the Tasman Sea at Nelson Haven, where the estuary is surrounded by some urbanised areas.

== Wildlife ==
Due to the vastness of the river, the Maitai River is host to a wide range of both flora and fauna, dependent on where they live along the river, both in the water and beside.

=== Fauna ===
The fauna surrounding and living within the river are typically dependent on the river as a means of both shelter and water and food, creating its own unique ecosystem. Where the river opens to the sea, there is an abundance of estuarine creatures, here fish and seabirds thrive, as well as crustaceans, sharing wildlife with the Nelson Haven which the river opens into. Shorebirds such as the Red Knot and oyster catchers appear here in abundance. As the river continues east, the estuary become less saline and joins with the freshwater river. Here wildlife can be seen that are typically rare, such as birds like the Rifleman and Kākāriki, who live in the forests surrounding the river. Other animals that use the river and its surrounding forests are reptiles like the Forest gecko and Northern grass skink, as well as invertebrates like the Giant land snail. Fish populations that live in the Maitai River consist of fish that are unique to New Zealand and the Nelson region, such as the inanga, longfin eel and brown trout. There have also been discoveries within the waters, such as new species of water-beetles in the river, that use the unique ecosystem of the river to survive.

=== Flora ===
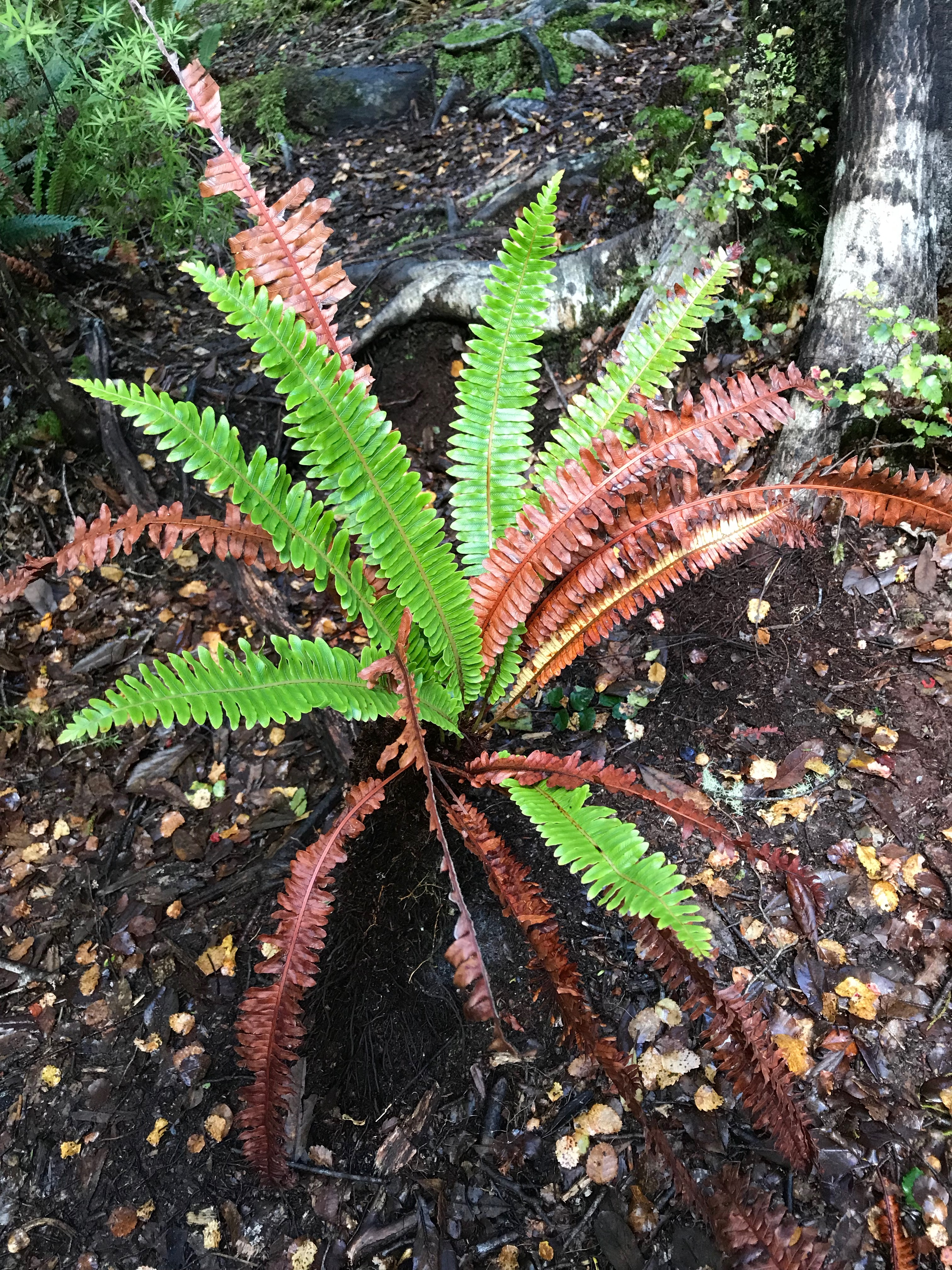
Maitai Crown Fern

Plants and vegetation rely heavily on the geography of the land surrounding the river, as well as the mineral and soil quality of the adjacent ground. As the river leads the city, and the river maintains somewhat close proximity to the city, it is lined by podocarp forests, which change as you follow the river eastward, where there is more of an abundance of beech vegetation due to the change in soil quality. Further East it is met by an abundance of tributaries, one of which, the mineral belt, has a unique soil, where very specialised flora is able to grow, making them both endangered and rare species. The lowland hill country ecosystem located around the river is covered in vegetation where the land slopes, where beech, podocarp and kāmahi foliage grows in abundance.

== Lifestyle and leisure ==
The Maitai River is used commonly and recreationally by both the people of Nelson and tourists, due to its proximity to the city and significance. Walking trails are common and line the river, typically starting at the city and then working their way east towards the Ranges, taking upwards of a few hours to complete. These trails are also existent within and just outside the city, where cycling and running is encouraged. These trails are lined with swimming holes, where those who visit are able to swim in the river itself. There are multiple swimming holes that go not only around the river near the city, but also further up the river which provide the residents and tourists with many options for enjoyment. Other leisure activities and practices surrounding the river include fishing and water activities, where the estuary provides access into the sea for a greater exploration of the river and its ecosystem. The river is also home to Golf courses, which use the river as both an attraction and a water source, providing recreational activity to those who live nearby. Camping and exploration are also common around this area, where places such as the Maitai Valley Camp, provide spaces for people to live in the splendor of the river. Cycling and biking trails also follow the river and its extremities. Leisure activities can be halted in the river in certain season due to changes in the river, whether it was the growth of algae or the imbalance of minerals in the river itself.

== Economic and resource sses ==
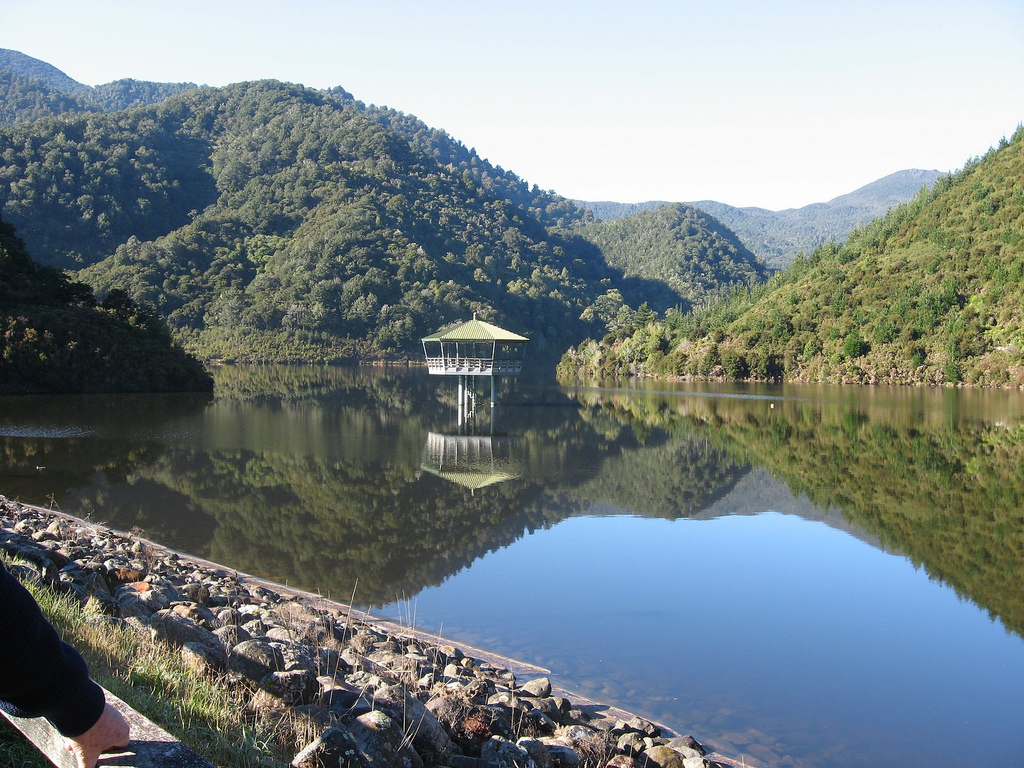

The Maitai River is a vital part of Nelson city's water, as it provides a large amount of usable water to the region. This water that the city uses comes from the Maitai as well as other sources, where the Maitai became vital after the introduction of the Maitai Water Supply Project. This project saw the increase of water storage capacity in the river that was to be used as a resource to the city, by almost more than double. The project saw the Maitai Dam and Reservoir were placed in the river in order to increase the storage capacity of Nelson City's water. The project also planned to provide the city with high quality water, without treatment more than chlorination. Plans and studies to implement these were started in 1980, and it took 49 months for these plans to be finalised and actualised, where final planning and designing began in April 1984, finishing approximately in the middle of 1986. Management of the water can prove difficult as the water fluctuates in both temperature and water quality, seen in effects such as the thermal stratification that can occur in the summer. Moreover, micro-bacteria and other concerns need to be managed within the river in order to ensure that the water maintains drinkable and usable buy the population and council of Nelson.

The river also has a dam, placed higher in the system towards the upper catchment which alters and impacts the fauna and flora of the area, as well as the flow of the river. This damming creates the Maitai Reservoir, which is capable of 50,000 m^{3} (1,800,000 cu ft) of water per day. This water supply is the main source of water for the city of Nelson so it is vital to the population that it is maintained and usable for the benefit of all around it. The dam and reservoir are expansive, where it covers approximately 32Ha of space, and sinks to 32.75m vertically down, allowing it to hold almost 4Mm^{3} of water to provide to the city. The reservoir is used to refill the dam when it is running low on water, however it is also used when regular conditions are in effect, returning water to the dam in need. The water quality of the dam and reservoir are constantly tested and monitored in order to determine the safety of the water to be used by the population for drinking or other household uses. These are implemented to ensure that the city is protected from flooding and to redirect the water to refill the dam if it is in need of water.

The Maitai river acts as a storm-water and flood channel which provides protection and also water to the city. These water and flood channels are utilised in a way to stop flood water from damaging properties and infrastructure within and surrounding Nelson City. These also work as a storm water drainage system, which helps the flow and the management of water in the river and city.

Forestry and plantations are also used around the Maitai River, which provides the water for the trees to grow. The mid-catchment area is also utilised as a place for plantations of pine trees.

== Friends of the Maitai ==
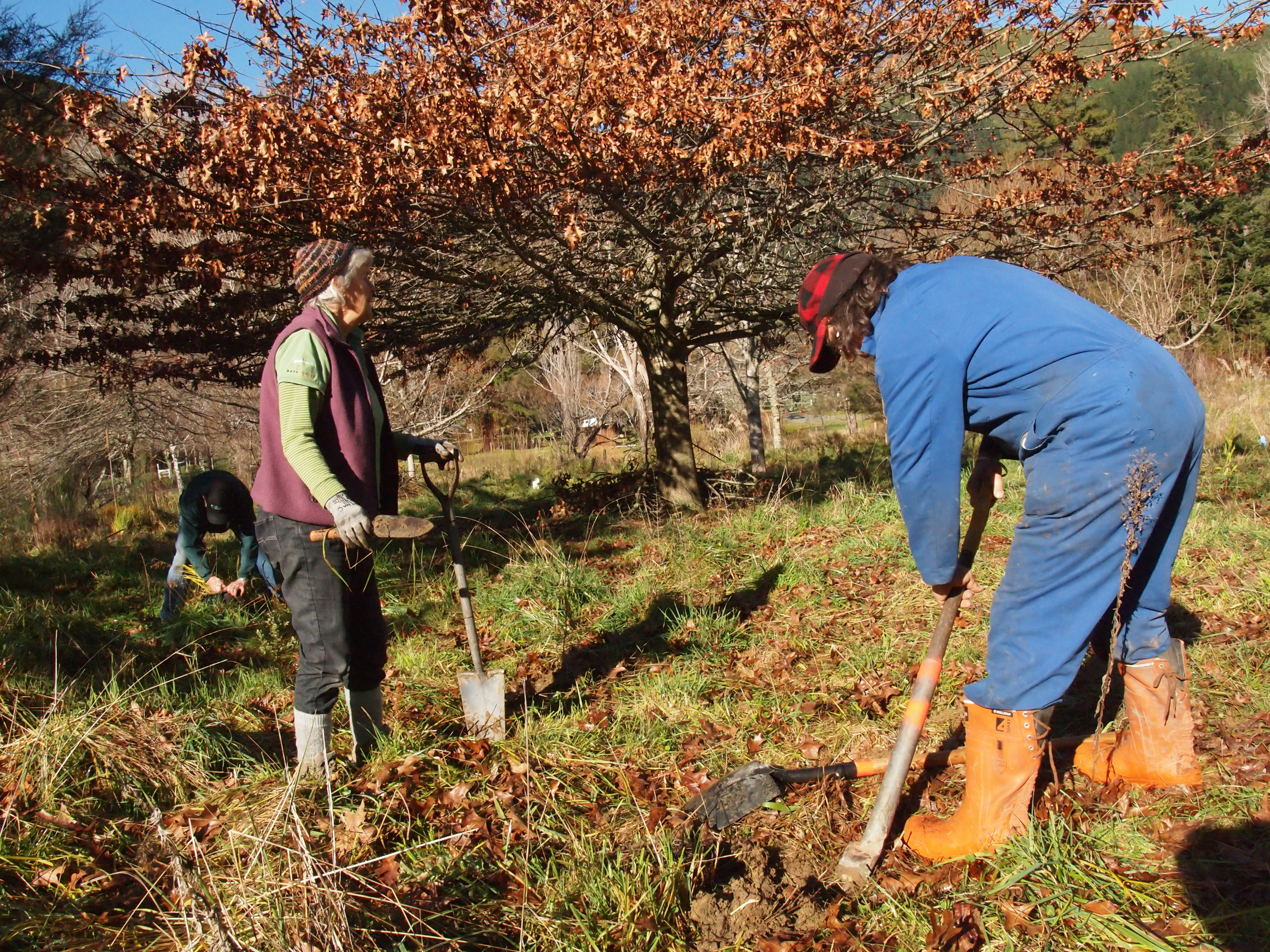
Groom Creek Planting Day

Friends of the Maitai (FOM) has taken an active role as an environmental watchdog several times over the past 50 years, when issues with potential impact on the river have arisen. The original Friends of the Maitai existed from 1977 to 1984, formed to oppose the Nelson City Council's plan to plant the Waahi Taakaro hillsides in pine trees. Instead FOM envisioned a river valley full of natives and recreational opportunities. Unfortunately, they lost that fight and disbanded when the High Court allowed the planting of pine trees to proceed. On the heels of that loss, the construction of the Maitai Dam in 1987 drew criticism from many residents due to its impact on river flows, but those concerns were allayed by the provision for a minimum flow level and no organised group formed to fight that battle. More recently, Nelson East residents rose up against logging trucks using Tory, Hardy and Milton Streets. They won some voluntary concessions from forestry companies, but logging trucks still go through the city on their way to the port.

Friends of the Maitai today

The latest incarnation of FOM came in 2014 after local residents got together with Nelson City Council staff to share some ideas for re-vegetation of the riverbank. Soon after this Council installed warning signs about toxic algae (cyanobacteria) and the residents’ group gathered more members and took up the title of Friends of the Maitai. Council launched a project called Project Maitai-Mahitahi and FOM took on the community aspect of this project, organising interest groups that include:

Planting and plant care – we have joined in Council planting days and held our own. The most significant area is the Groom Creek Wetland, where thousands of shrubs, trees and grasses have transformed a once desolate area.

River monitoring – a group regularly monitors a site in the Maitai Stream at another in Brook tributary. Data from this citizen science project feeds into monitoring undertaken by NIWA, Nelson City Council and Cawthron Institute. FOM gained a grant from Council in 2019 to install a continuous river monitor to improve the reliability of data.

Forestry – sediment from the harvesting of Pinus radiata has been identified by Cawthron as the main issue affecting water quality of the Maitai River. The forestry group works with the industry and with Council on improving practices, with a view to eventually retiring pine forest.

Communication – this group maintains a website, Facebook page and regular seasonal newsletters; as well making submissions to council and communicating with members and with media over any major issues.

Representatives from the interest groups gather every six weeks for a hub meeting when information is shared and activities are planned. Friends of the Maitai has no formal structure and welcomes interest from new members.
