= Wai-iti River =

Coordinates: 41.420°S 172.998°E

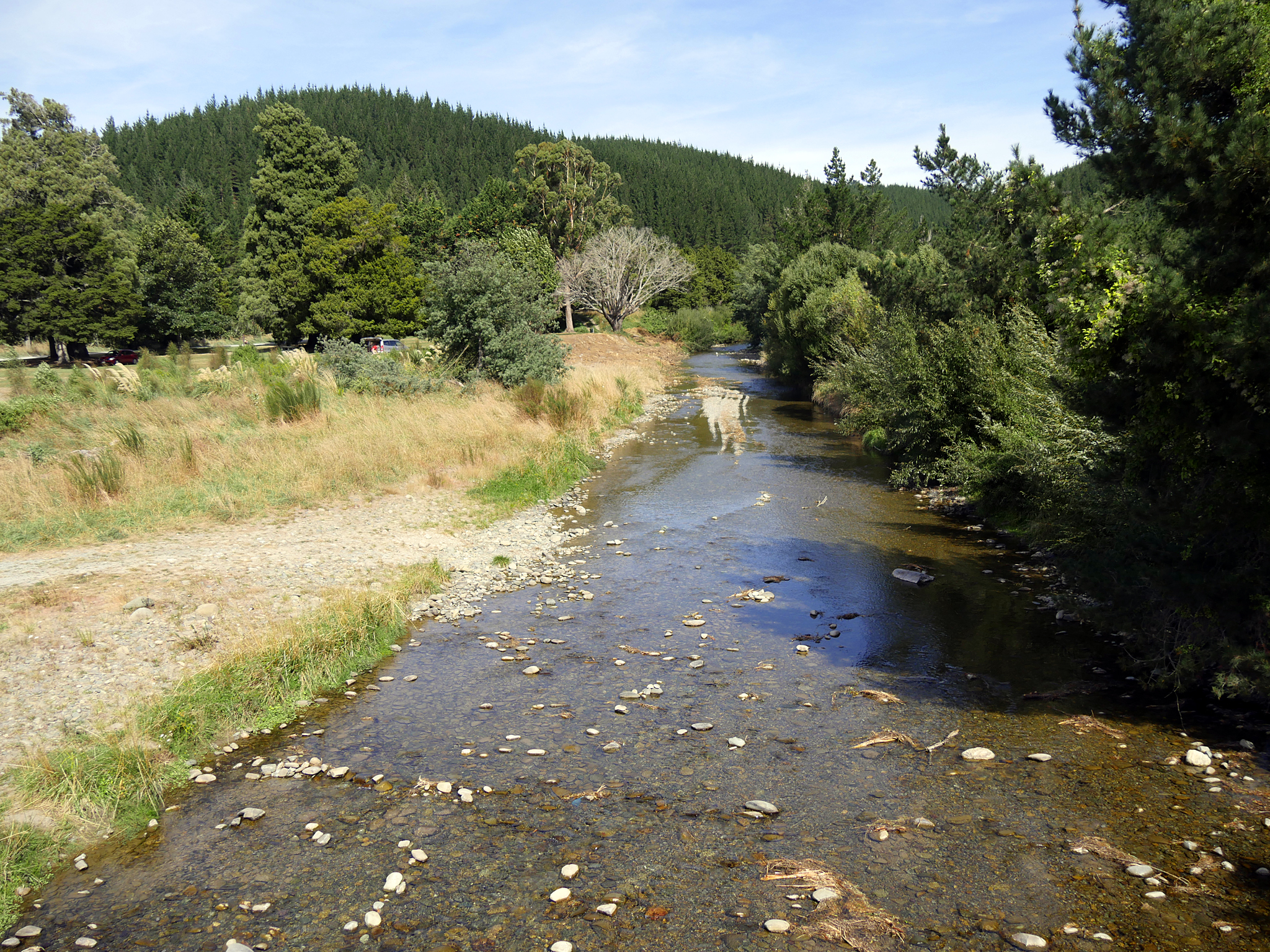
- Wai-iti River, viewed from State Highway 6

Location
- Country: New Zealand

Physical characteristics
- Mouth
  - location: Tasman Bay / Te Tai-o-Aorere
- Length: 45 km (28 mi)

The Wai-iti River is in the north of the South Island of New Zealand. It flows northeast for 45 kilometres (28 mi) before combining with the Wairoa River to form the Waimea River. This flows into the southern end of Tasman Bay / Te Tai-o-Aorere near Richmond.

The New Zealand Ministry for Culture and Heritage gives a translation of "little stream" for Wai-iti.
