= Aniseed Valley =

Locality in Tasman District, New Zealand

- Locality
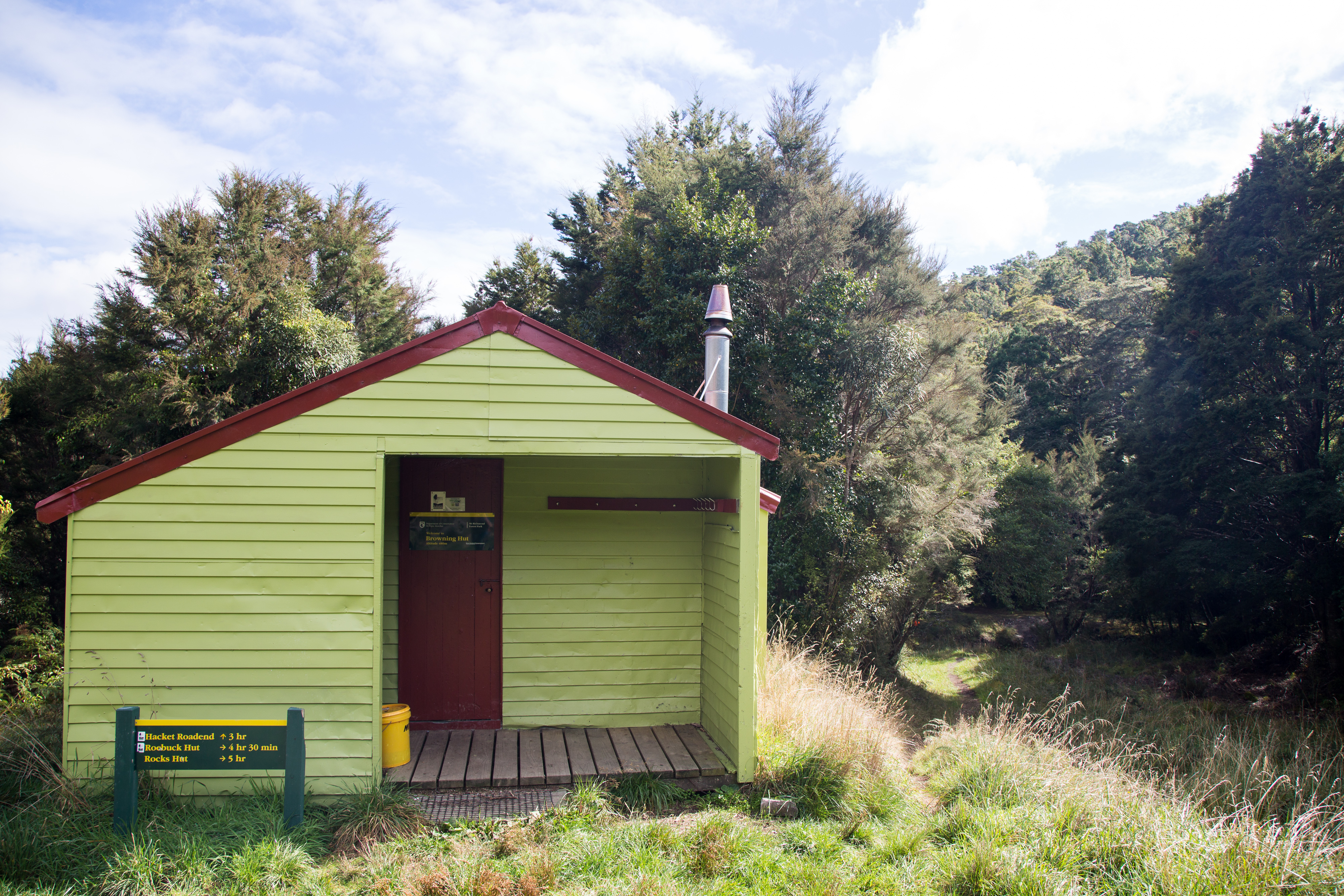
- Browning Hut in Mount Richmond Forest Park
- Interactive map of Aniseed Valley
- Coordinates: 41.367°S 173.243°E
- Country: New Zealand
- Territorial authority: Tasman
- Ward: Richmond Ward
- Electorates: Nelson; Te Tai Tonga (Māori)

Government
  - Territorial Authority: Tasman District Council
  - Mayor of Tasman: Tim King
  - Nelson MP: Rachel Boyack
  - Te Tai Tonga MP: Tākuta Ferris

Area
  - Total: 57.21 km^{2} (22.09 sq mi)

Population (June 2025)
  - Total: 520
  - Density: 9.1/km^{2} (24/sq mi)
- Time zone: UTC+12 (NZST)
  - Summer (DST): UTC+13 (NZDT)
- Area code: 03

Aniseed Valley is a locality running between the Tasman and Nelson regions in the South Island of New Zealand. It is located around the Roding River southeast of Hope. The main road in the area is Aniseed Valley Road, which starts at State Highway 6 at Hope.

Copper was discovered in the upper valley in 1881, and several mines, smelters and tramways were developed in the 1880s, but closed down due to low copper prices. An attempt to reopen the mines in the early 20th century failed after a few years. There are walking tracks which allow visitors to view the ruins and mining sites.

Aniseed Valley School was extant between 1905 and 1938.

The Hackett carpark on Aniseed Valley Road gives access to a track, part of Te Araroa, along Hackett Creek to the Whispering Falls in the Mount Richmond Forest Park. Both the Hackett carpark & creek are named after surveyor Thomas Ridge Hackett (1827-1884). Hacket was an early colonist in Aniseed Valley and bought his first plot of land there from William Stratford I (1819-1888) in 1858.

== Demographics ==
The Aniseed Valley statistical area covers 57.21 km^{2} (22.09 sq mi). It had an estimated population of 520 as of June 2025, with a population density of 9.1 people per km^{2}.

Historical population
| Year | Pop. | ±% p.a. |
|---|---|---|
| 2006 | 345 | — |
| 2013 | 396 | +1.99% |
| 2018 | 492 | +4.44% |
| 2023 | 501 | +0.36% |

Aniseed Valley had a population of 501 in the 2023 New Zealand census, an increase of 9 people (1.8%) since the 2018 census, and an increase of 105 people (26.5%) since the 2013 census. There were 255 males, 243 females, and 3 people of other genders in 156 dwellings. 3.0% of people identified as LGBTIQ+. The median age was 43.0 years (compared with 38.1 years nationally). There were 99 people (19.8%) aged under 15 years, 84 (16.8%) aged 15 to 29, 243 (48.5%) aged 30 to 64, and 75 (15.0%) aged 65 or older.

People could identify as more than one ethnicity. The results were 95.8% European (Pākehā); 9.0% Māori; 1.2% Pasifika; 1.8% Asian; 1.2% Middle Eastern, Latin American and African New Zealanders (MELAA); and 2.4% other, which includes people giving their ethnicity as "New Zealander". English was spoken by 98.2%, Māori by 1.2%, and other languages by 6.6%. No language could be spoken by 1.2% (e.g. too young to talk). The percentage of people born overseas was 19.2, compared with 28.8% nationally.

Religious affiliations were 35.3% Christian, 0.6% Hindu, 0.6% Buddhist, 0.6% New Age, 0.6% Jewish, and 1.2% other religions. People who answered that they had no religion were 56.9%, and 5.4% of people did not answer the census question.

Of those at least 15 years old, 114 (28.4%) people had a bachelor's or higher degree, 231 (57.5%) had a post-high school certificate or diploma, and 60 (14.9%) people exclusively held high school qualifications. The median income was $43,800, compared with $41,500 nationally. 54 people (13.4%) earned over $100,000 compared to 12.1% nationally. The employment status of those at least 15 was 195 (48.5%) full-time, 84 (20.9%) part-time, and 6 (1.5%) unemployed.
