= Brightwater =

Town in Tasman District, New Zealand

Brightwater Wairoa
- Town
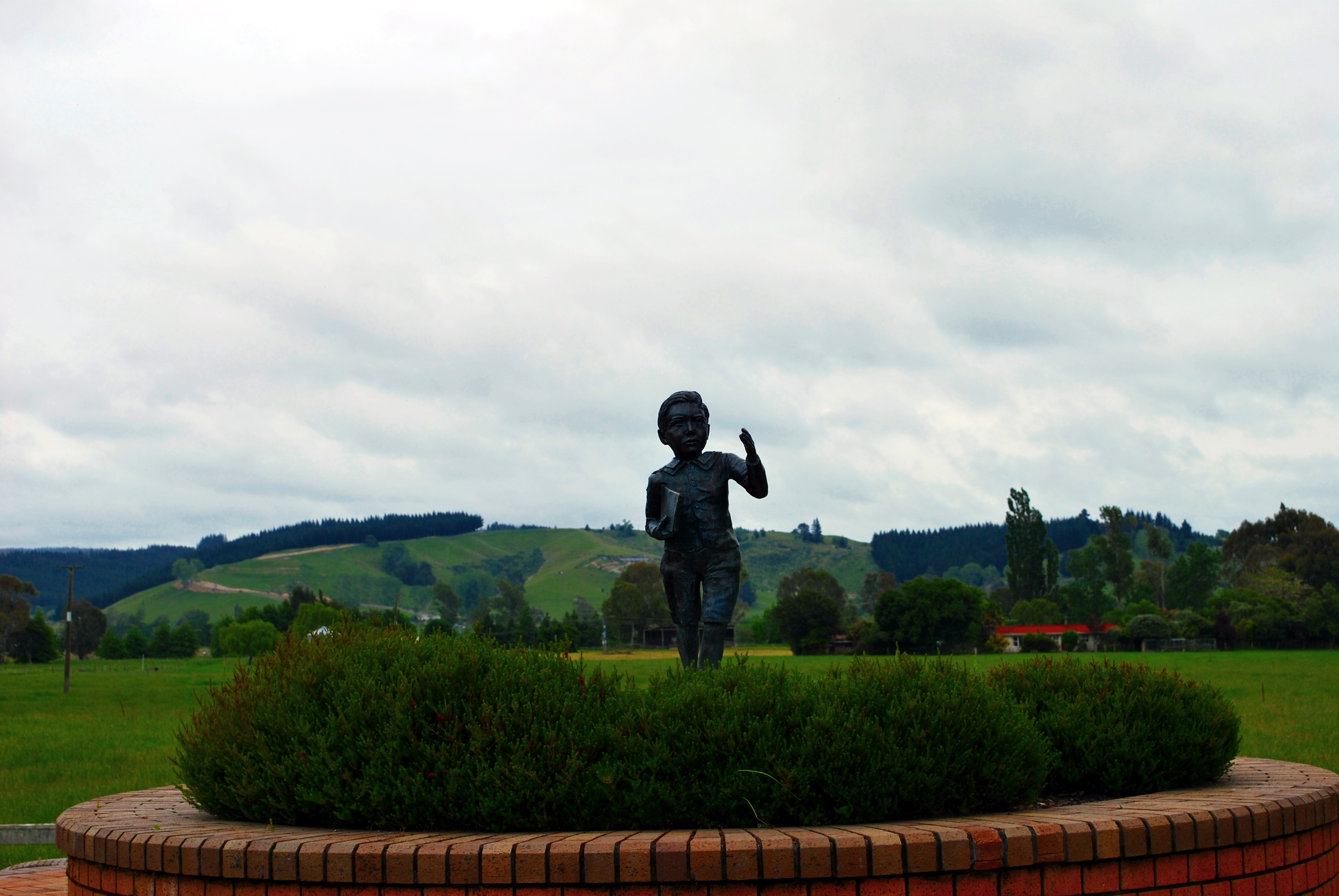
- Ernest Rutherford memorial
- Interactive map of Brightwater
- Coordinates: 41.379°S 173.114°E
- Country: New Zealand
- Territorial authority: Tasman
- First Settled: 1843
- Named: 1855
- Electorates: West Coast-Tasman; Te Tai Tonga (Māori)

Government
  - Territorial Authority: Tasman District Council
  - Mayor of Tasman: Tim King
  - West Coast-Tasman MP: Maureen Pugh
  - Te Tai Tonga MP: Tākuta Ferris

Area
  - Total: 4.67 km^{2} (1.80 sq mi)
- Elevation: 33 m (108 ft)

Population (June 2025)
  - Total: 2,330
  - Density: 499/km^{2} (1,290/sq mi)

Brightwater (Māori: Wairoa) is a town 20 kilometres (12 mi) southwest of Nelson in Tasman District in the South Island of New Zealand. It stands on the banks of the Wairoa River. The area was settled as early as 1843, although the name Brightwater was not adopted until the late 1870's.

Brightwater was the birthplace of Nobel Prize-winning scientist, the "father of nuclear physics", Ernest Rutherford, and has an elaborate Lord Rutherford Birthplace memorial on Lord Rutherford Road.

== Name ==
Various names for the town were used in the 19th century, including Wairoa (after the river), or Spring Grove, the name now used for the mostly-rural area to the south between Brightwater and Wakefield.

The first documented use of the name Brightwater was by Alfred Saunders, the owner of a local flax mill situated on the banks of the Wairoa River and a prominent temperance activist. He named his mill Brightwater Mill, possibly because of the clarity of the water in Wairoa River, but more plausibly after the temparance song My Drink is Water Bright.

When the Nelson Section railway opened in January 1876, the town's station was named Wairoa (with the Spring Grove station a little further south). In October 1876, the Chief Postmaster reported that ″A Post Office has been opened at the store of Mr Langford, near the Wairoa Railway Station. The Office is called Brightwater to distinguish it from Wairoa Post Office Auckland, and Wairoa Post Office, Napier.″. By 1880 the railway station had also been re-named Brightwater.

The naming of the post office and railway station made the town's de-facto name Brightwater, although there's no evidence that the name ever had official status in the 19th century. It was not until the 21st century that the New Zealand Geographic Board made many de-facto names official; Brightwater was officially named effective 27 October 2016.

== Population ==
Stats NZ describes Brightwater as a small urban area, which covers 4.67 km^{2} (1.80 sq mi) It had an estimated population of 2,330 as of June 2025, with a population density of 499 people per km^{2}.

Historical population
Year	Pop.	±% p.a.
2006	1,827	—
2013	1,794	−0.26%
2018	2,133	+3.52%
2023	2,280	+1.34%
The 2006 population is for a larger area of 4.84 km^{2}. Source:

Brightwater had a population of 2,280 in the 2023 New Zealand census, an increase of 147 people (6.9%) since the 2018 census, and an increase of 486 people (27.1%) since the 2013 census. There were 1,131 males, 1,137 females, and 9 people of other genders in 813 dwellings. 2.8% of people identified as LGBTIQ+. The median age was 38.0 years (compared with 38.1 years nationally). There were 516 people (22.6%) aged under 15 years, 384 (16.8%) aged 15 to 29, 1,068 (46.8%) aged 30 to 64, and 312 (13.7%) aged 65 or older.

People could identify as more than one ethnicity. The results were 95.4% European (Pākehā); 11.2% Māori; 2.0% Pasifika; 1.3% Asian; 0.3% Middle Eastern, Latin American and African New Zealanders (MELAA); and 2.6% other, which includes people giving their ethnicity as "New Zealander". English was spoken by 98.0%, Māori by 1.7%, Samoan by 0.3%, and other languages by 4.6%. No language could be spoken by 1.7% (e.g. too young to talk). New Zealand Sign Language was known by 0.4%. The percentage of people born overseas was 14.1, compared with 28.8% nationally.

Religious affiliations were 24.7% Christian, 0.3% Buddhist, 0.4% New Age, and 1.1% other religions. People who answered that they had no religion were 65.9%, and 7.5% of people did not answer the census question.

Of those at least 15 years old, 291 (16.5%) people had a bachelor's or higher degree, 1,098 (62.2%) had a post-high school certificate or diploma, and 372 (21.1%) people exclusively held high school qualifications. The median income was $46,800, compared with $41,500 nationally. 171 people (9.7%) earned over $100,000 compared to 12.1% nationally. The employment status of those at least 15 was 996 (56.5%) full-time, 276 (15.6%) part-time, and 21 (1.2%) unemployed.

== Education ==
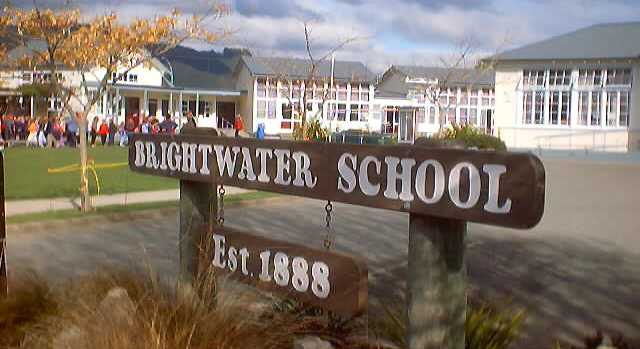
Brightwater School

Brightwater School is a year 1 to 8 primary school founded in 1888, with a roll of 239 as of July 2026. The school campus has a dental clinic, reading recovery building, two sports fields, two playgrounds, a hard court area, a large shade structure and a swimming pool.

Four other schools previously operated in the area: Brightwater School for Girls (1881–1889), River Terrace School (1855–1920), Spring Grove School (1845–1974), and Waimea West School (1846–1938).

== Businesses ==
Brightwater is mainly an agricultural town. Because of its climate of little rain, it is hot from October through March, and it commonly experiences frosts during the winter. The main agriculture of the area is wine growing.

== Sports ==
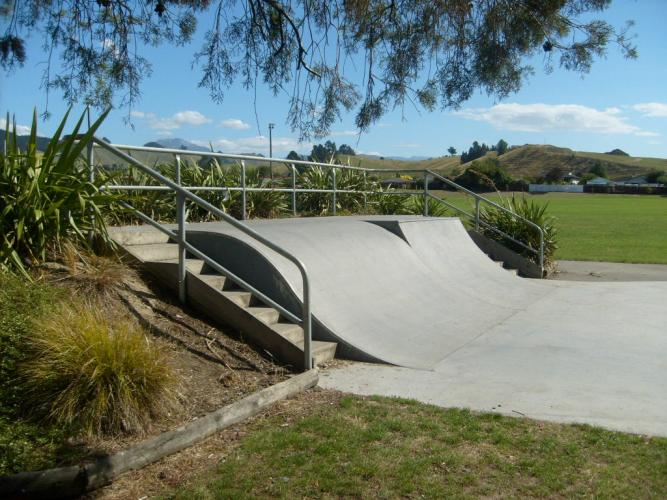
The Skatepark in the Brightwater Domain

Brightwater's main recreational area is the Brightwater Domain. The Domain includes the town hall, a skatepark, a playground, tennis courts and several playing fields.

Brightwater has a small number of sports teams (mainly rugby teams), the most famous of which being the Wanderers, the Brightwater rugby team.

== Notable people ==
- Ernest Rutherford (1871–1937), physicist and Nobel Laureate
- Jack Newman (1902–1996), cricketer and business executive
- Sarah McMurray (1848–1943), woodcarver and craftswoman
- Nate Wilbourne (born 2008), environmentalist
