= Ernest Rutherford memorial =

Statue of Ernest Rutherford marking his birthplace in Brightwater, New Zealand

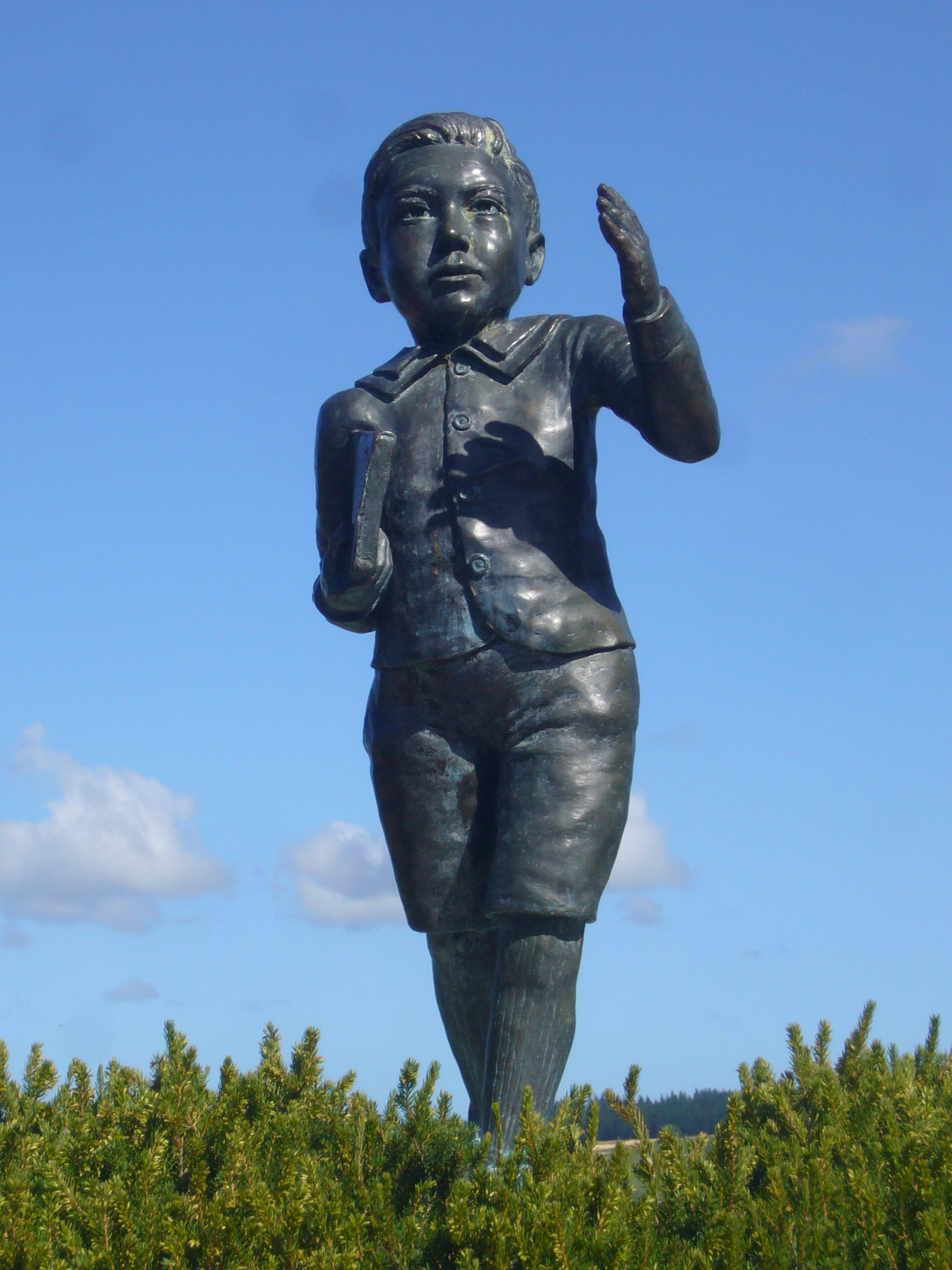
- Artist: Paul Walshe
- Year: 1991
- Subject: Ernest Rutherford
- Location: Brightwater, New Zealand; 41.3772°S 173.1018°E

The Ernest Rutherford memorial includes a statue of the New Zealand scientist Ernest Rutherford, who won the Nobel Prize in Chemistry in 1908. It depicts Rutherford as a child, and is located near his birthplace in Brightwater, New Zealand. The sculptor was Paul Walshe of Monaco. The memorial also includes a mound surrounded by terraces with plants and trees from places where he worked: Canada, England and New Zealand. It cost $400,000 and was opened in 1991.

== History ==
The idea for having a memorial for Rutherford was brought up in a meeting of October 1981. Initially, the plan was to create a statue of an atom, but it was scrapped after the thought that it could become the site of an anti-nuclear protest.

The Waimea District Council allocated $12,000 for landscaping and building walls for the memorial. There was a delay because part of the land used for the memorial was not owned by the council. The owner did not transfer the land to public ownership in time due to a dispute.

By early 1988, the memorial still consisted only of a chipped concrete slab with a plaque. Writing in The Nelson Mail on 23 February 1988, John Campbell of University of Canterbury's physics department called this state of affairs a "national disgrace", saying that while there was no danger Rutherford, who lived on through his work in science, would be forgotten, New Zealand and the region needed to properly commemorate their famous native son.

The plan for the current design of the memorial was approved in late 1988. The memorial was opened on 6 December 1991 by Governor-General Dame Catherine Tizard; its total cost was $400,000. Guests of the opening included Rutherford's grandchildren.

In the early morning on 5 August 2022 the statue was stolen. Footage from CCTV showed a man who had tied a rope around the statue and rocked it back and forth until it snapped about half an hour later. It was taken away by bicycle, and was brought back by police two days later after it was found in an attic.

== Other statues of Rutherford ==
There is a statue depicting Rutherford splitting the atom in Qingpu Statue Garden in Shanghai, China.
