= Roding River =

Coordinates: 41°24′S 173°08′E

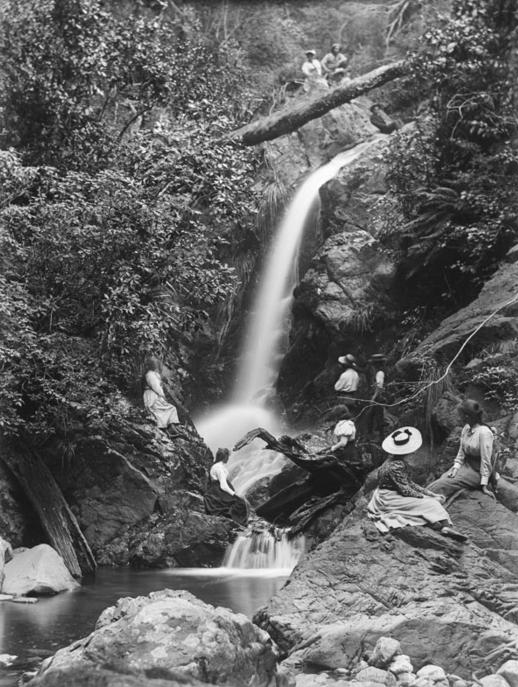

Location
- Country: New Zealand

Physical characteristics
- Mouth
  - location: Lee River
- Length: 23 km (14 mi)

The Roding River is a river of the Tasman Region of New Zealand's South Island. Located in the Aniseed Valley, the area is rich in minerals and mining took place in the 19th century. Despite being a river in the Tasman Region (or Waimea County at the time), it has been a significant source of drinking water for the city of Nelson since 1941.

== Location ==
It flows generally southwest from its sources in the hills above the city of Nelson and the town of Richmond. The Roding River is located south-east of the Barnicoat Range and flows through the Aniseed Valley. The Roding River flows into the Lee River some five kilometres south of Richmond.

== Mining ==
The rock type Rodingite is named after the Roding River. The catchment has numerous mine sites and shafts which attempted to make the copper and chromite deposits in the Dun Mountain–Maitai terrane profitable in the late 19th century. The mining engineer G. B. Stewart proposed to build a tunnel for a branch railway from Stoke to the Aniseed Valley under the Barnicoat Range to give access to the mines, arguing that the tunnel could also be used for Nelson's water supply. This branch line would have connected to the Nelson section.

== Water supply ==
The Hume Pipe Company approached local authorities in the Nelson district with a proposal to build a tunnel from the Roding River under the Barnicoat Range towards Nelson. At the time, the Roding River was part of Waimea County. The areas to be supplied covered Stoke, New Zealand (then part of Waimea County), Tāhunanui town board, Nelson City, and Richmond (then Richmond Borough). Representatives from those areas met in Nelson in late 1933 to discuss the proposal. Nelson City Council had developed its own proposal for a water supply tunnel. The meeting decided that the proposal should go ahead. The Nelson City Engineer, James Gordon Littlejohn, produced a report in March 1934 outlining seven option for water supply: the Hume scheme, a Nelson City scheme connecting to the Roding River, and five options for obtaining water from the Maitai River. In July 1934, Nelson City Council adopted its own Roding River scheme, and resolved to undertake the project by itself without adjacent authorities, but willing to sell water to them. Central government supported the proposal with a £NZ35,000 (Note: The grant was originally set at £NZ25,000, but later increased to £NZ35,000.) grant under the condition that Nelson City must make water available to adjacent authorities, which also gave the city to proceed with the more expensive Roding scheme compared to the Maitai alternative. Parliament passed the Nelson Waterworks Extension Act 1935 to facilitate the proposal.

The construction of the tunnel, a reservoir, and reticulation within Nelson was put out to tender and the contract awarded to the Hume Pipe Company in March 1938. The intake dam was left for construction at a later time. The tunnel work was subcontracted to Downer Bros and the material excavated from the tunnel was used for construction work at Nelson Airport. The water supply system commenced on 29 September 1941. The tunnel is 1.95 m (6 ft 5 in) high and 1.2 m (3 ft 11 in) wide, and has a length of 2.68 km (1.67 mi). The Roding River weir has limited storage capacity. A dam with more capacity was built in the Roding River in 1961. Water supply for Nelson became insufficient in the 1970s, and Nelson City Council commissioned the Maitai Dam to increase the supply; that dam was commissioned in 1987. Since July 2004, the water from both the Roding River scheme and the Maitai Dam goes through a water treatment plant near the Tantragee Saddle.

== See also ==
- List of rivers of New Zealand
