= Rodingite =

Metamorphic rock

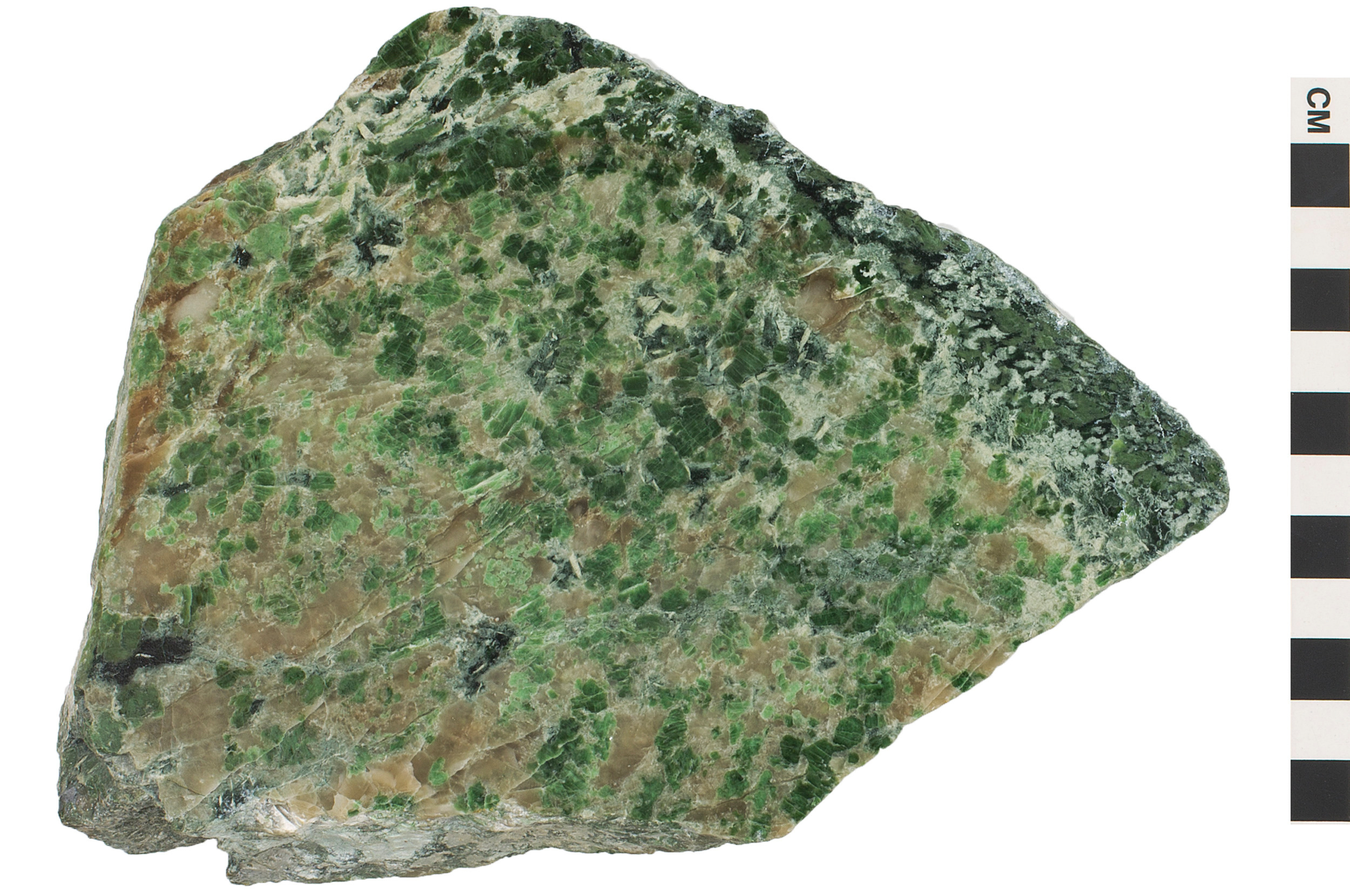
Rodingite from Maryland

Rodingite is a metasomatic rock composed of grossular-andradite garnet, calcic pyroxene, vesuvianite, epidote and scapolite. Rodingites are common where mafic rocks are in proximity to serpentinized ultramafic rocks. The mafic rocks are altered by high pH, Ca^{2+} and OH^{−} fluids, which are a byproduct of the serpentinization process, and become rodingites. The mineral content of rodingites is highly variable, their high calcium, low silicon and environment of formation being their defining characteristic. Rodingites are common in ophiolites, serpentinite mélanges, ocean floor peridotites and eclogite massifs. Rodingite was first named from outcrops of the Dun Mountain Ophiolite Belt in the Roding River, Nelson, New Zealand.

An obsolete name for rodingite is granatite.

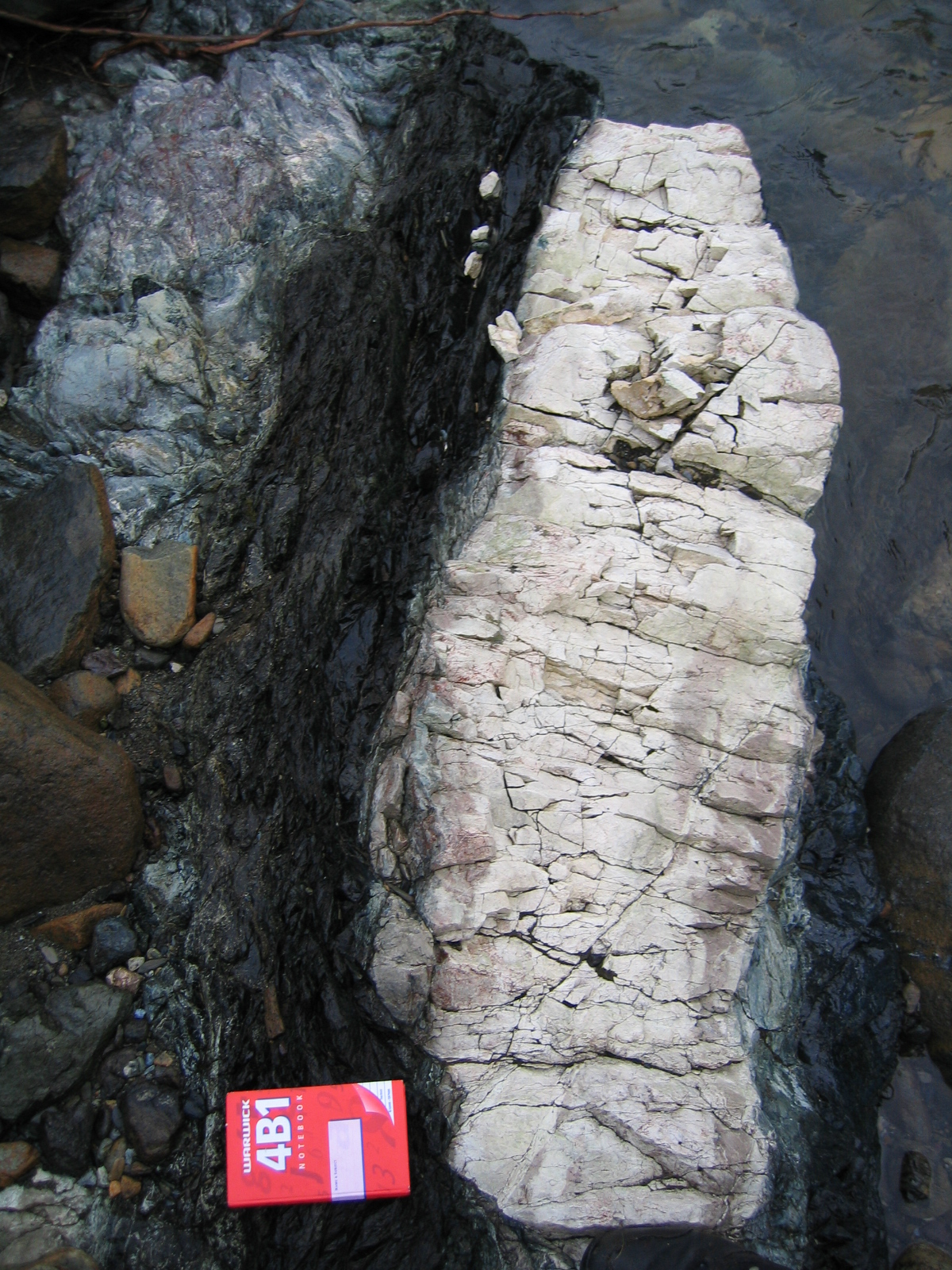
A rodingite dyke (white) in serpentinite (green) in the Dun Mountain Ophiolite Belt, New Zealand
