= Ernest Rutherford =

New Zealand physicist and chemist (1871–1937)

The Right Honourable The Lord Rutherford of Nelson OM FRS
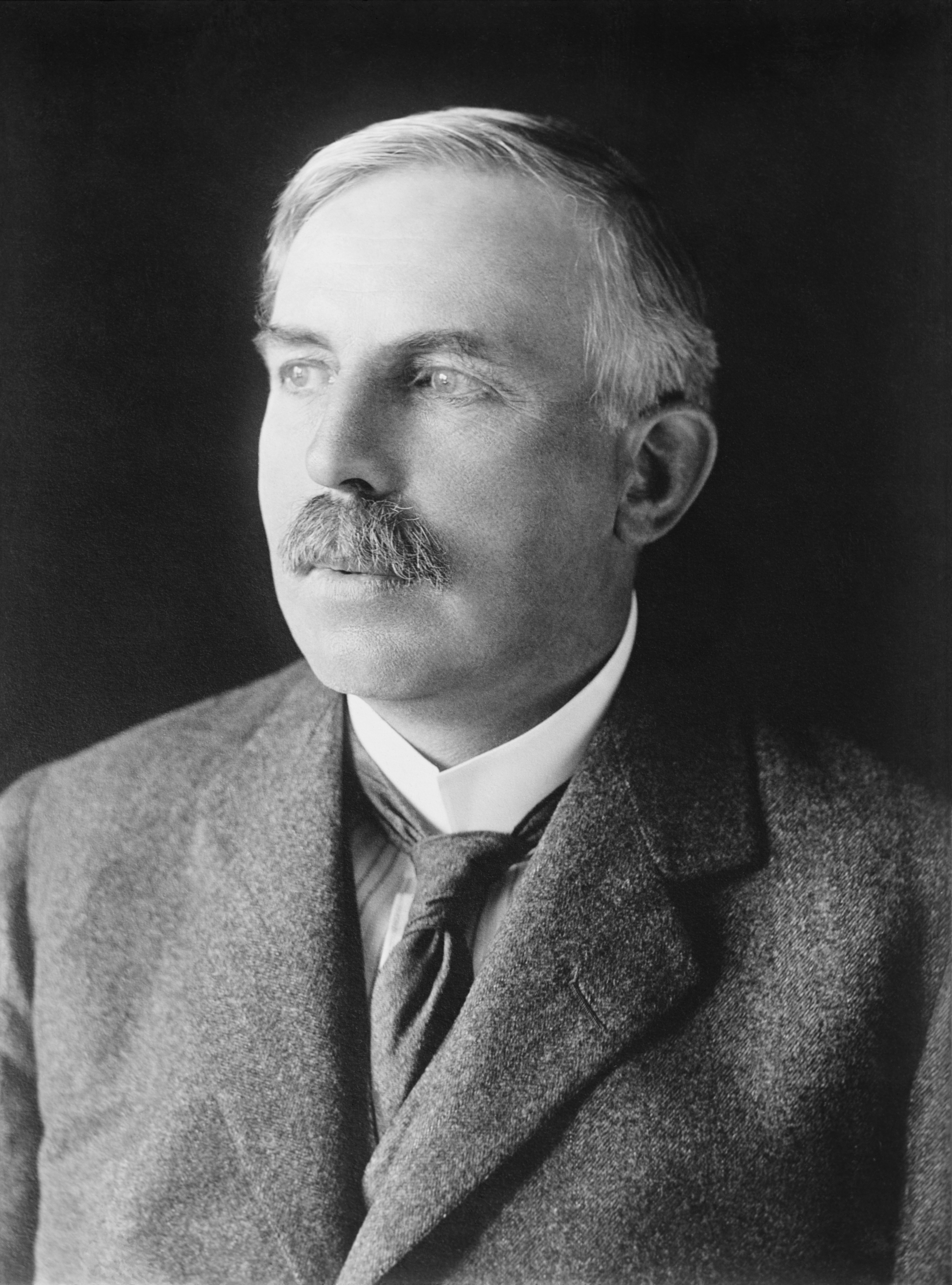
- Rutherford, c. 1920s

44th President of the Royal Society
- In office 1925–1930
- Preceded by: Sir Charles Sherrington
- Succeeded by: Sir Frederick Hopkins

Personal details
- Born: 30 August 1871 Spring Grove, Colony of New Zealand
- Died: 19 October 1937 (aged 66) Cambridge, England
- Resting place: Westminster Abbey
- Spouse: Mary Georgina Newton (m. 1900)
- Children: 1
- Relatives: Ralph Fowler (son-in-law)
- Education: University of New Zealand (BA, MA, BSc); University of Cambridge (BA)
- Known for: Discovery of the atomic nucleus; Discovery of the proton; Discovery of radon; Theory of the neutron
- Awards: Rumford Medal (1904); Nobel Prize in Chemistry (1908); Elliott Cresson Medal (1910); Matteucci Medal (1913); Hector Memorial Medal (1916); Copley Medal (1922); Franklin Medal (1924); Albert Medal (1928); Faraday Medal (1930); Faraday Lectureship Prize (1936); Wilhelm Exner Medal (1936)
- Scientific career
- Fields: Physics; Chemistry
- Workplaces: McGill University; Victoria University of Manchester; University of Cambridge
- Academic advisors: Alexander Bickerton; J. J. Thomson
- Doctoral students: See list: Nazir Ahmed; James Chadwick; Rafi Muhammad Chaudhry; John Cockcroft; Norman Feather; Leslie H. Martin; Mark Oliphant; C. F. Powell; Henry DeWolf Smyth; Ernest Walton; Zhang Wenyu
- Other notable students: See list: Kenneth Bainbridge; Patrick Blackett; Charles Galton Darwin; Charles Drummond Ellis; Kazimierz Fajans; George Gamow; Maria Goeppert Mayer; Otto Hahn; George de Hevesy; Ernest Marsden; Philip Burton Moon; Henry Moseley; Frederick Soddy

Ernest Rutherford, 1st Baron Rutherford of Nelson (30 August 1871 – 19 October 1937) was a New Zealand physicist and chemist who was a pioneering researcher in both atomic and nuclear physics. He has been described as "the father of nuclear physics" and "the greatest experimentalist since Michael Faraday". In 1908, he was awarded the Nobel Prize in Chemistry "for his investigations into the disintegration of the elements, and the chemistry of radioactive substances."

Rutherford's discoveries include the concept of radioactive half-life, the radioactive element radon, and the differentiation and naming of alpha and beta radiation. Together with Thomas Royds, Rutherford is credited with proving that alpha radiation is composed of helium nuclei. In 1911, he theorised that atoms have their charge concentrated in a very small nucleus. He arrived at this theory through his discovery and interpretation of Rutherford scattering during the gold foil experiment performed by Hans Geiger and Ernest Marsden. In 1912, he invited Niels Bohr to join his lab, leading to the Bohr model of the atom. In 1917, he performed the first artificially induced nuclear reaction by conducting experiments in which nitrogen nuclei were bombarded with alpha particles. These experiments led him to discover the emission of a subatomic particle that he initially called the "hydrogen atom", but later (more precisely) renamed the proton. He is also credited with developing the atomic numbering system alongside Henry Moseley. His other achievements include advancing the fields of radio communications and ultrasound technology.

Rutherford became Director of the Cavendish Laboratory at the University of Cambridge in 1919. Under his leadership, the neutron was discovered by James Chadwick in 1932. In the same year, the first controlled experiment to split the nucleus was performed by John Cockcroft and Ernest Walton, working under his direction. In honour of his scientific advancements, Rutherford was recognised as a baron of the United Kingdom. After his death in 1937, he was buried in Westminster Abbey near Charles Darwin and Isaac Newton. The chemical element rutherfordium (_{104}Rf) was named after him in 1997. In 1999, he was named the tenth greatest physicist of all time. His portrait has been on the New Zealand one hundred-dollar note since 1999.

== Early life and education ==
Ernest Rutherford was born on 30 August 1871 in Spring Grove (now Brightwater), Nelson Province, New Zealand, the fourth of twelve children of Martha (née Thompson) and James Rutherford. His father was a mechanic from Perth, Scotland, while his mother was a schoolteacher from Hornchurch, England; they immigrated to New Zealand in 1842 and 1855, respectively. His birth certificate was mistakenly written as 'Earnest'. He was known by his family as Ern.

When Rutherford was age 5, he moved to Foxhill, Tasman, New Zealand, and attended Foxhill School. At age 11 in 1883, the Rutherford family moved to Havelock, in the Marlborough Sounds, where Ernest attended Havelock School. The move was made to be closer to the flax mill run by Rutherford's father.

In 1887, on his second attempt, he won a scholarship to study at Nelson College. On his first examination attempt, he had the highest mark of anyone from Nelson. When he was awarded the scholarship, he had received 580 out of 600 possible marks. After being awarded the scholarship, Havelock School presented him with a five-volume set of books titled The Peoples of the World. He studied at Nelson College between 1887 and 1889, and was head boy in 1889. He also played in the school's rugby team. He was offered a cadetship in government service, but he declined as he still had 15 months of college remaining.

In 1889, after his second attempt, he won a scholarship to study at Canterbury College, University of New Zealand, between 1890 and 1894. He participated in its debating society and the science society. At Canterbury, he was awarded a Bachelor of Arts in Pure Mathematics and Latin in 1892, a Master of Arts with double first-class honours in Mathematics, Mathematical Physics and Physical Science in 1893, and a Bachelor of Science in Chemistry and Geology in 1894.

Thereafter, Rutherford invented a new form of a radio receiver, and in 1895 he was awarded an 1851 Research Fellowship from the Royal Commission for the Exhibition of 1851, to travel to England for postgraduate study in the Cavendish Laboratory at the University of Cambridge. In 1897, he was awarded a Bachelor of Arts research degree and the Coutts-Trotter Studentship from Trinity College, Cambridge.

== Career and research ==
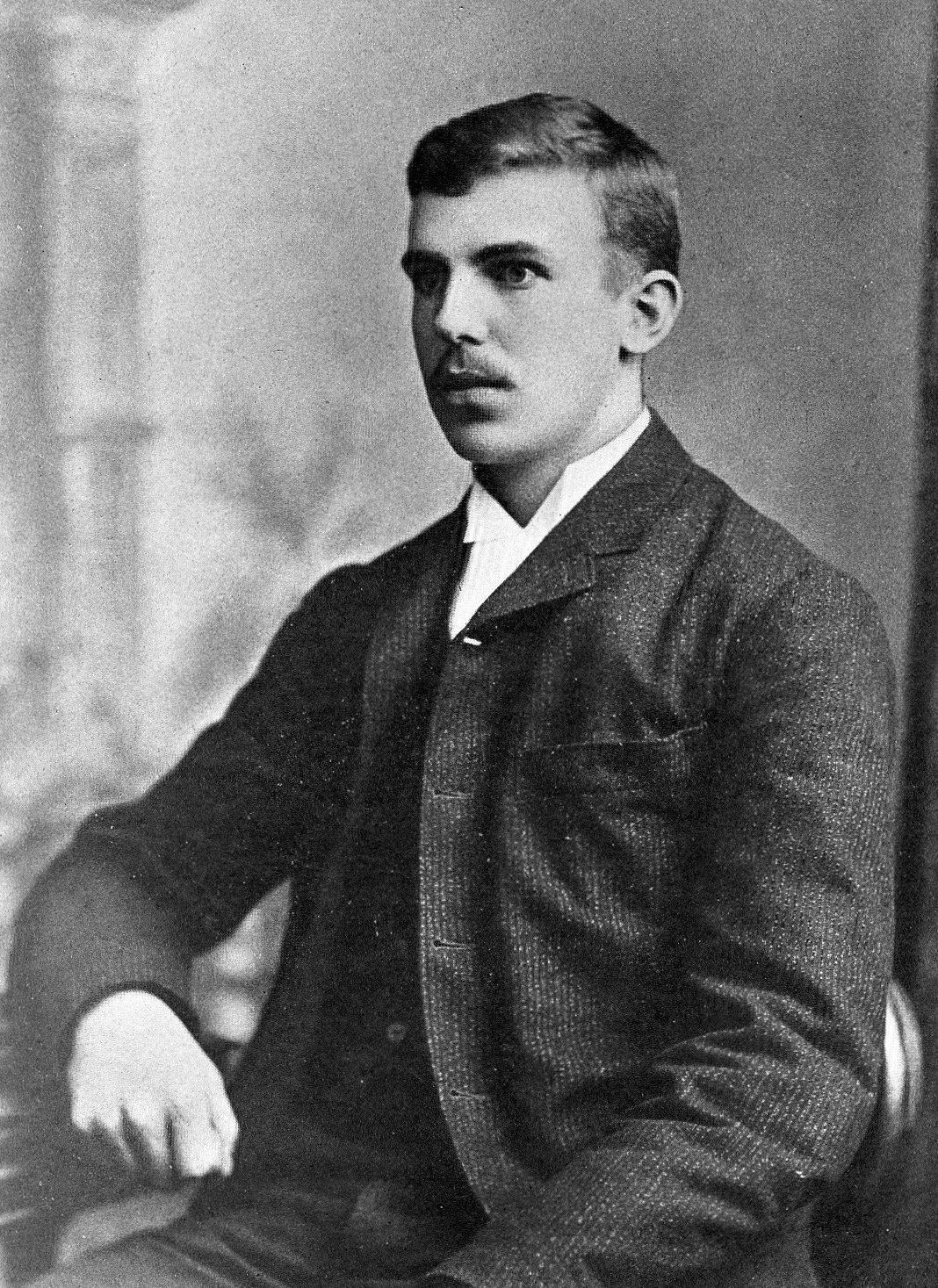
Rutherford in 1892

When Rutherford began his studies at Cambridge, he was among the first 'aliens' (those without a Cambridge degree) allowed to do research at the university, and was additionally honoured to study under J. J. Thomson.

With Thomson's encouragement, Rutherford detected radio waves at 0.5 miles (800 m), and briefly held the world record for the distance over which electromagnetic waves could be detected, although when he presented his results at the British Association meeting in 1896, he discovered he had been outdone by Guglielmo Marconi, whose radio waves had sent a message across nearly 10 miles (16 km).

=== Radioactivity ===
Again under Thomson's leadership, Rutherford worked on the conductive effects of X-rays on gases, which led to the discovery of the electron, the results first presented by Thomson in 1897. Hearing of Henri Becquerel's experience with uranium, Rutherford started to explore its radioactivity, discovering two types that differed from X-rays in their penetrating power. Continuing his research in Canada, in 1899 he coined the terms "alpha ray" and "beta ray" to describe these two distinct types of radiation.

In 1898, Rutherford accepted the Macdonald Chair of Physics at McGill University in Montreal, Canada, on Thomson's recommendation. From 1900 to 1903, he was joined at McGill by the young chemist Frederick Soddy (Nobel Prize in Chemistry, 1921) for whom he set the problem of identifying the noble gas emitted by the radioactive element thorium, a substance which was itself radioactive and would coat other substances. Once he had eliminated all the normal chemical reactions, Soddy suggested that it must be one of the inert gases, which they named thoron. This substance was later found to be ^{220}Rn, an isotope of radon. They also found another substance they called Thorium X, later identified as ^{224}Rn, and continued to find traces of helium. They also worked with samples of "Uranium X" (protactinium), from William Crookes, and radium, from Marie Curie. Rutherford further investigated thoron in conjunction with R.B. Owens and found that a sample of radioactive material of any size invariably took the same amount of time for half the sample to decay (in this case, 11 1/2 minutes), a phenomenon for which he coined the term "half-life". Rutherford and Soddy published their paper "Law of Radioactive Change" to account for all their experiments. Until then, atoms were assumed to be the indestructible basis of all matter; and although Curie had suggested that radioactivity was an atomic phenomenon, the idea of the atoms of radioactive substances breaking up was a radically new idea. Rutherford and Soddy demonstrated that radioactivity involved the spontaneous disintegration of atoms into other, as yet, unidentified matter.

In 1903, Rutherford considered a type of radiation, discovered (but not named) by French chemist Paul Villard in 1900, as an emission from radium, and realised that this observation must represent something different from his own alpha and beta rays, due to its very much greater penetrating power. Rutherford therefore gave this third type of radiation the name of gamma ray. All three of Rutherford's terms are in standard use today – other types of radioactive decay have since been discovered, but Rutherford's three types are among the most common. In 1904, Rutherford suggested that radioactivity provides a source of energy sufficient to explain the existence of the Sun for the many millions of years required for the slow biological evolution on Earth proposed by biologists such as Charles Darwin. The physicist Lord Kelvin had argued earlier for a much younger Earth, based on the insufficiency of known energy sources, but Rutherford pointed out, at a lecture attended by Kelvin, that radioactivity could solve this problem. In 1907, he returned to Britain to take the Langworthy Professorship at the Victoria University of Manchester.

In Manchester, Rutherford continued his work with alpha radiation. In conjunction with Hans Geiger, he developed zinc sulphide scintillation screens and ionisation chambers to count alpha particles. By dividing the total charge accumulated on the screen by the number counted, Rutherford determined that the charge on the alpha particle was two. In late 1907, Ernest Rutherford and Thomas Royds allowed alphas to penetrate a very thin window into an evacuated tube. As they sparked the tube into discharge, the spectrum obtained from it changed, as the alphas accumulated in the tube. Eventually, the clear spectrum of helium gas appeared, proving that alphas were at least ionised helium atoms, and probably helium nuclei. In 1910 Rutherford, with Geiger and mathematician Harry Bateman published their classic paper describing the first analysis of the distribution in time of radioactive emission, a distribution now called the Poisson distribution.

=== Model of the atom ===
Top: Expected results: alpha particles passing through the plum pudding model of the atom undisturbed. Bottom: Observed results: a small portion of the particles were deflected, indicating a small, concentrated charge. Diagram is not to scale; in reality the nucleus is vastly smaller than the electron shell.

Rutherford continued to make ground-breaking discoveries long after receiving the Nobel prize in 1908. Under his direction in 1909, Hans Geiger and Ernest Marsden performed the Geiger–Marsden experiment, which demonstrated the nuclear nature of atoms by measuring the deflection of alpha particles passing through a thin gold foil. Rutherford was inspired to ask Geiger and Marsden in this experiment to look for alpha particles with very high deflection angles, which was not expected according to any theory of matter at that time. Such deflection angles, although rare, were found. Reflecting on these results in one of his last lectures, Rutherford was quoted as saying: "It was quite the most incredible event that has ever happened to me in my life. It was almost as incredible as if you fired a 15-inch shell at a piece of tissue paper and it came back and hit you." It was Rutherford's interpretation of this data that led him to propose the nucleus, a very small, charged region containing much of the atom's mass.

In 1912, Rutherford was joined by Niels Bohr (who postulated that electrons moved in specific orbits about the compact nucleus). Bohr adapted Rutherford's nuclear structure to be consistent with Max Planck's quantum hypothesis. The resulting Bohr model was the basis for quantum mechanical atomic physics of Heisenberg which remains valid today.

=== Piezoelectricity ===
During World War I, Rutherford worked on a top-secret project to solve the practical problems of submarine detection. Both Rutherford and Paul Langevin suggested the use of piezoelectricity, and Rutherford successfully developed a device which measured its output. The use of piezoelectricity then became essential to the development of ultrasound as it is known today. The claim that Rutherford developed sonar, however, is a misconception, as subaquatic detection technologies utilise Langevin's transducer.

=== Discovery of the proton ===
Together with H.G. Moseley, Rutherford developed the atomic numbering system in 1913. Rutherford and Moseley's experiments used cathode rays to bombard various elements with streams of electrons and observed that each element responded in a consistent and distinct manner. Their research was the first to assert that each element could be defined by the properties of its inner structures – an observation that later led to the discovery of the atomic nucleus. This research led Rutherford to theorise that the hydrogen atom (at the time the least massive entity known to bear a positive charge) was a sort of "positive electron" – a component of every atomic element.

It was not until 1919 that Rutherford expanded upon his theory of the "positive electron" with a series of experiments beginning shortly before the end of his time at Manchester. He found that nitrogen, and other light elements, ejected a proton, which he called a "hydrogen atom," when hit with α (alpha) particles. In particular, he showed that particles ejected by alpha particles colliding with hydrogen have unit charge and 1/4 the momentum of alpha particles.

Rutherford returned to the Cavendish Laboratory in 1919, succeeding J. J. Thomson as Cavendish Professor of Physics, a position he held until his death in 1937. During his tenure, Nobel prizes were awarded to James Chadwick for discovering the neutron (in 1932), John Cockcroft and Ernest Walton for an experiment that was to be known as "splitting the atom" using a particle accelerator, and Edward Appleton for demonstrating the existence of the ionosphere.

=== Development of proton and neutron theory ===
In 1919–1920, Rutherford continued his research on the "hydrogen atom" to confirm that alpha particles break down nitrogen nuclei and to affirm the nature of the products. This result showed Rutherford that hydrogen nuclei were a part of nitrogen nuclei (and by inference, probably other nuclei as well). Such a construction had been suspected for many years, on the basis of atomic weights that were integral multiples of that of hydrogen; see Prout's hypothesis. Hydrogen was known to be the lightest element, and its nuclei presumably the lightest nuclei. Now, because of all these considerations, Rutherford decided that a hydrogen nucleus was possibly a fundamental building block of all nuclei, and also possibly a new fundamental particle as well, since nothing was known to be lighter than that nucleus. Thus, confirming and extending the work of Wilhelm Wien, who in 1898 discovered the proton in streams of ionised gas, in 1920 Rutherford postulated the hydrogen nucleus to be a new particle, which he dubbed the proton.

In 1921, while working with Niels Bohr, Rutherford theorised about the existence of neutrons, (which he had christened in his 1920 Bakerian Lecture), which could somehow compensate for the repelling effect of the positive charges of protons by causing an attractive nuclear force and thus keep the nuclei from flying apart, due to the repulsion between protons. The only alternative to neutrons was the existence of "nuclear electrons", which would counteract some of the proton charges in the nucleus, since by then it was known that nuclei had about twice the mass that could be accounted for if they were simply assembled from hydrogen nuclei (protons). But how these nuclear electrons could be trapped in the nucleus, was a mystery.

In 1932, Rutherford's theory of neutrons was proved by his associate James Chadwick, who recognised neutrons immediately when they were produced by other scientists and later himself, in bombarding beryllium with alpha particles. In 1935, Chadwick was awarded the Nobel Prize in Physics for this discovery.

=== Induced nuclear reaction and probing the nucleus ===
In Rutherford's four-part article on the "Collision of α-particles with light atoms" he reported two additional fundamental and far reaching discoveries. First, he showed that at high angles the scattering of alpha particles from hydrogen differed from the theoretical results he himself published in 1911. These were the first results to probe the interactions that hold a nucleus together. Second, he showed that α-particles colliding with nitrogen nuclei would react rather than simply bounce off. One product of the reaction was the proton; the other product was shown by Patrick Blackett, Rutherford's colleague and former student, to be oxygen:

^{14}N + α → ^{17}O + p.

Rutherford therefore recognised "that the nucleus may increase rather than diminish in mass as the result of collisions in which the proton is expelled". Blackett was awarded the Nobel prize in 1948 for his work in perfecting the high-speed cloud chamber apparatus used to make that discovery and many others.

== Personal life and death ==
In 1900, at St Paul's Anglican Church, Papanui in Christchurch, Rutherford married Mary Georgina Newton (1876–1954), to whom he had been engaged before leaving New Zealand. They had one daughter, Eileen Mary (1901–1930); she married the physicist Ralph Fowler, and died during the birth of her fourth child. Rutherford's hobbies included golf and motoring.

While working in Manchester, Rutherford lived in the suburb of Withington, on Wilmslow Road. The house is now known as Rutherford Lodge and received a blue plaque in 2012. There is also a memorial set into the pavement in front of Withington Library.

For some time before his death, Rutherford had a small hernia, which he neglected to have repaired, and it eventually became strangulated, rendering him violently ill. He had an emergency operation in London, but died in Cambridge four days later, on 19 October 1937, at the age of 66, of what physicians termed "intestinal paralysis". After cremation at Golders Green Crematorium, he was given the high honour of burial in Westminster Abbey, near Isaac Newton, Charles Darwin, and other illustrious British scientists.

== Recognition ==
=== Memberships ===
Year	Organisation	Type	Ref.
1903	Royal Society	Fellow	
1904	American Philosophical Society	International Member	
1921	Royal Society of Edinburgh	Honorary Fellow	

=== Awards ===
Year	Organisation	Award	Citation	Ref.
1904	Royal Society	Rumford Medal	"For his researches on radio-activity, particularly for his discovery of the existence and properties of the gaseous emanations from radio-active bodies."	
1908	Royal Swedish Academy of Sciences	Nobel Prize in Chemistry	"For his investigations into the disintegration of the elements, and the chemistry of radioactive substances."	
1910	Franklin Institute	Elliott Cresson Medal	"For distinguished work in electrical theory."	
1913	Accademia dei XL	Matteucci Medal	—	
1916	Royal Society of New Zealand	Hector Memorial Medal	—	
1922	Royal Society	Copley Medal	"For his researches in radio activity & atomic structure."	
1924	Franklin Institute	Franklin Medal	"For knowledge of the chemical elements, their constitution and relationship."	
1928	Royal Society of Arts	Albert Medal	—	
1930	Institution of Electrical Engineers	Faraday Medal	—	
1936	Royal Society of Chemistry	Faraday Lectureship Prize	—	
1936	Österreichischer Gewerbeverein	Wilhelm Exner Medal	—	

=== Honours ===
Year	Country	Honour	Ref.
1914	United Kingdom	Knight Bachelor	
1925	United Kingdom	Order of Merit	
1931	United Kingdom	Baron	

== Legacy ==
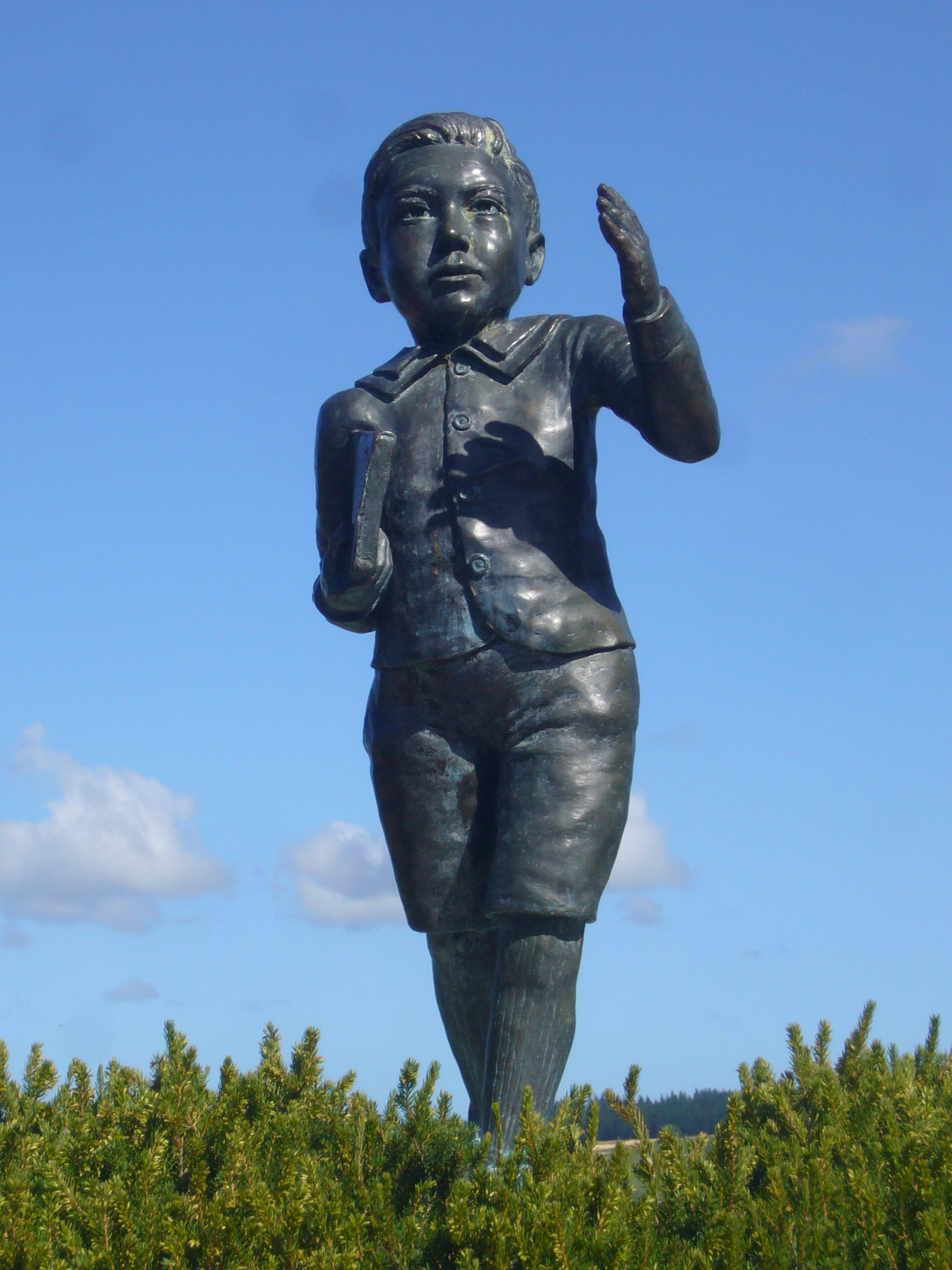
A statue of a young Ernest Rutherford at his memorial in Brightwater, New Zealand.

At the opening session of the 1938 Indian Science Congress, which Rutherford had been expected to preside over before his death, astrophysicist James Jeans spoke in his place and deemed him "one of the greatest scientists of all time", saying:

In his flair for the right line of approach to a problem, as well as in the simple directness of his methods of attack, [Rutherford] often reminds us of Faraday, but he had two great advantages which Faraday did not possess, first, exuberant bodily health and energy, and second, the opportunity and capacity to direct a band of enthusiastic co-workers. Great though Faraday's output of work was, it seems to me that to match Rutherford's work in quantity as well as in quality, we must go back to Newton. In some respects he was more fortunate than Newton. Rutherford was ever the happy warrior – happy in his work, happy in its outcome, and happy in its human contacts.

Rutherford has featured on postage stamps from at least four countries. Since 1999 he has appeared on the New Zealand one hundred-dollar note.

=== Nuclear physics ===
Rutherford is known as "the father of nuclear physics" because his research, and work done under him as laboratory director, established the nuclear structure of the atom and the essential nature of radioactive decay as a nuclear process. Patrick Blackett, a research fellow working under Rutherford, using natural alpha particles, demonstrated induced nuclear transmutation. Later, Rutherford's team, using protons from an accelerator, demonstrated artificially-induced nuclear reactions and transmutation.

Rutherford died too early to see Leó Szilárd's idea of controlled nuclear chain reactions come into being. However, a speech of Rutherford's about his artificially-induced transmutation in lithium, printed in the 12 September 1933 issue of The Times, was reported by Szilárd to have been his inspiration for thinking of the possibility of a controlled energy-producing nuclear chain reaction.

Rutherford's speech touched on the 1932 work of his students John Cockcroft and Ernest Walton in "splitting" lithium into alpha particles by bombardment with protons from a particle accelerator they had constructed. Rutherford realised that the energy released from the split lithium atoms was enormous, but he also realised that the energy needed for the accelerator, and its essential inefficiency in splitting atoms in this fashion, made the project an impossibility as a practical source of energy (accelerator-induced fission of light elements remains too inefficient to be used in this way, even today). Rutherford's speech in part, read:

We might in these processes obtain very much more energy than the proton supplied, but on the average we could not expect to obtain energy in this way. It was a very poor and inefficient way of producing energy, and anyone who looked for a source of power in the transformation of the atoms was talking moonshine. But the subject was scientifically interesting because it gave insight into the atoms.

The element rutherfordium, Rf, Z=104, was named in honour of Rutherford in 1997.

== In popular culture ==
Andrew Hodwitz portrays Rutherford in episode 11 of season 13 "Staring Blindly into the Future" (13 January 2020) of the Canadian television period detective series Murdoch Mysteries.

== Publications ==
=== Books ===
- Radio-activity (1904), 2nd ed. (1905), ISBN 978-1-60355-058-1
- Radioactive Transformations (1906), ISBN 978-1-60355-054-3
- Radioaktive Substanzen und ihre Strahlungen. Cambridge: University press. 1933.
- Radioaktive Substanzen und ihre Strahlungen (in German). Leipzig: Akademische Verlaggesellschaft. 1913.
- Radioactive Substances and their Radiations (1913)
- The Electrical Structure of Matter (1926)
- The Artificial Transmutation of the Elements (1933)
- The Newer Alchemy (1937)

=== Articles ===
- Ernest Rutherford (1899). "Uranium Radiation and the Electrical conduction Produced by it". Philosophical Magazine. 47 (284): 109–163.
- Ernest Rutherford (1903). "XV. The Magnetic and Electric Deviation of the easily absorbed Rays from Radium". Philosophical Magazine. 6. 5: 177-187.
- Ernest Rutherford (1906). "The Mass and Velocity of the α particles expelled from Radium and Actinium". Philosophical Magazine. Series 6. 12 (70): 348–371. doi:10.1080/14786440609463549.
- Ernest Rutherford; Thomas Royds (1909). "XXI. The nature of the α particle from radioactive substances". The London, Edinburgh, and Dublin Philosophical Magazine and Journal of Science. 17 (98): 281–286. doi:10.1080/14786440208636599. ISSN 1941-5982.
- Ernest Rutherford (1911). "The Scattering of α and β Particles by Matter and the Structure of the Atom" (PDF). Philosophical Magazine. Series 6. 21 (125): 669–688. doi:10.1080/14786440508637080.
- Ernest Rutherford (1912). "The origin of β and γ rays from radioactive substances". Philosophical Magazine. Series 6. 24 (142): 453–462. doi:10.1080/14786441008637351.
- Ernest Rutherford; John Mitchell Nuttal (1913). "Scattering of α-Particles by Gases". Philosophical Magazine. Series 6. 26 (154): 702–712. doi:10.1080/14786441308635014.
- Ernest Rutherford (1914). "The Structure of the Atom". Philosophical Magazine. Series 6. 27 (159): 488–498. doi:10.1080/14786440308635117.
- Ernest Rutherford (1938). "Forty Years of Physics". In Needham, Joseph; Pagel, Walter (eds.). Background to Modern Science: Ten Lectures at Cambridge arranged by the History of Science Committee 1936. Cambridge University Press.
- Ernest Rutherford (1913). Radioactive Substances and their Radiations. Cambridge University Press.
- Ernest Rutherford (1936). "Radioactivity and Atomic Structure". Journal of the Chemical Society. 1936: 508–516. doi:10.1039/JR9360000508.
- "Disintegration of the Radioactive Elements" Harper's Monthly Magazine, January 1904, pages 279 to 284.

== See also ==
- Bateman equation
- Hydrophone
- Magnetic detector
- Neutron generator
- Royal Society of New Zealand
- Rutherford (unit)
- Rutherfordine
- The Rutherford Journal
- List of presidents of the Royal Society

Academic offices
Preceded by Arthur Schuster	Langworthy Professor at the University of Manchester; 1907–1919	Succeeded by Lawrence Bragg
Preceded by J. J. Thomson	Cavendish Professor of Experimental Physics, University of Cambridge; 1919-1937	Succeeded by Lawrence Bragg
