= Wairoa River (Tasman) =

Coordinates: 41.3463°S 173.1155°E

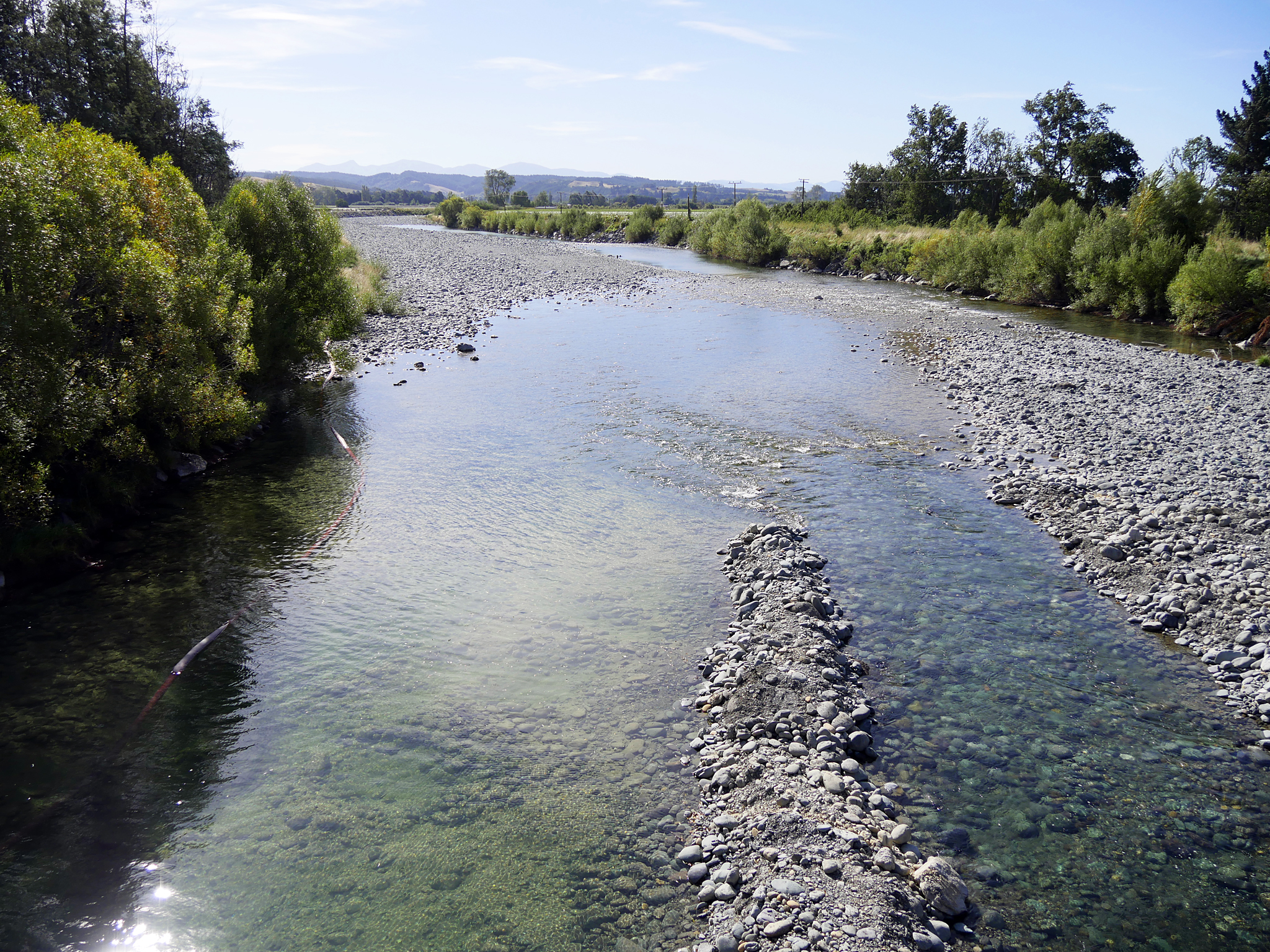

Location
- Country: New Zealand

Physical characteristics
- Source
  - location: Gordon Range
- Mouth
  - location: Waimea River
- Length: 45 kilometres (28 mi)

The Wairoa River is located in the north of the South Island of New Zealand. It flows north for 45 kilometres before combining with the Wai-iti River to form the Waimea River. This flows into the southern end of Tasman Bay / Te Tai-o-Aorere near Richmond.
